= Himachal Pradesh =

State in northwestern India

- State
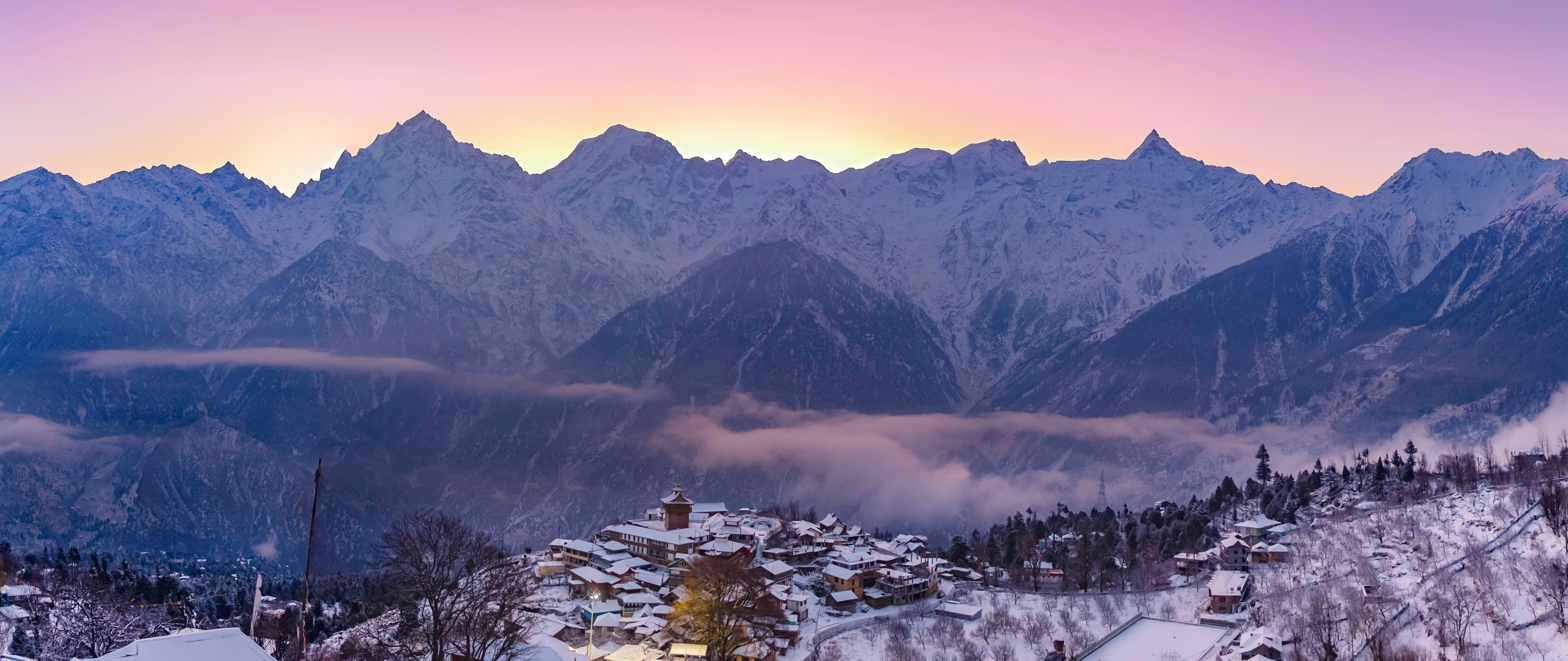
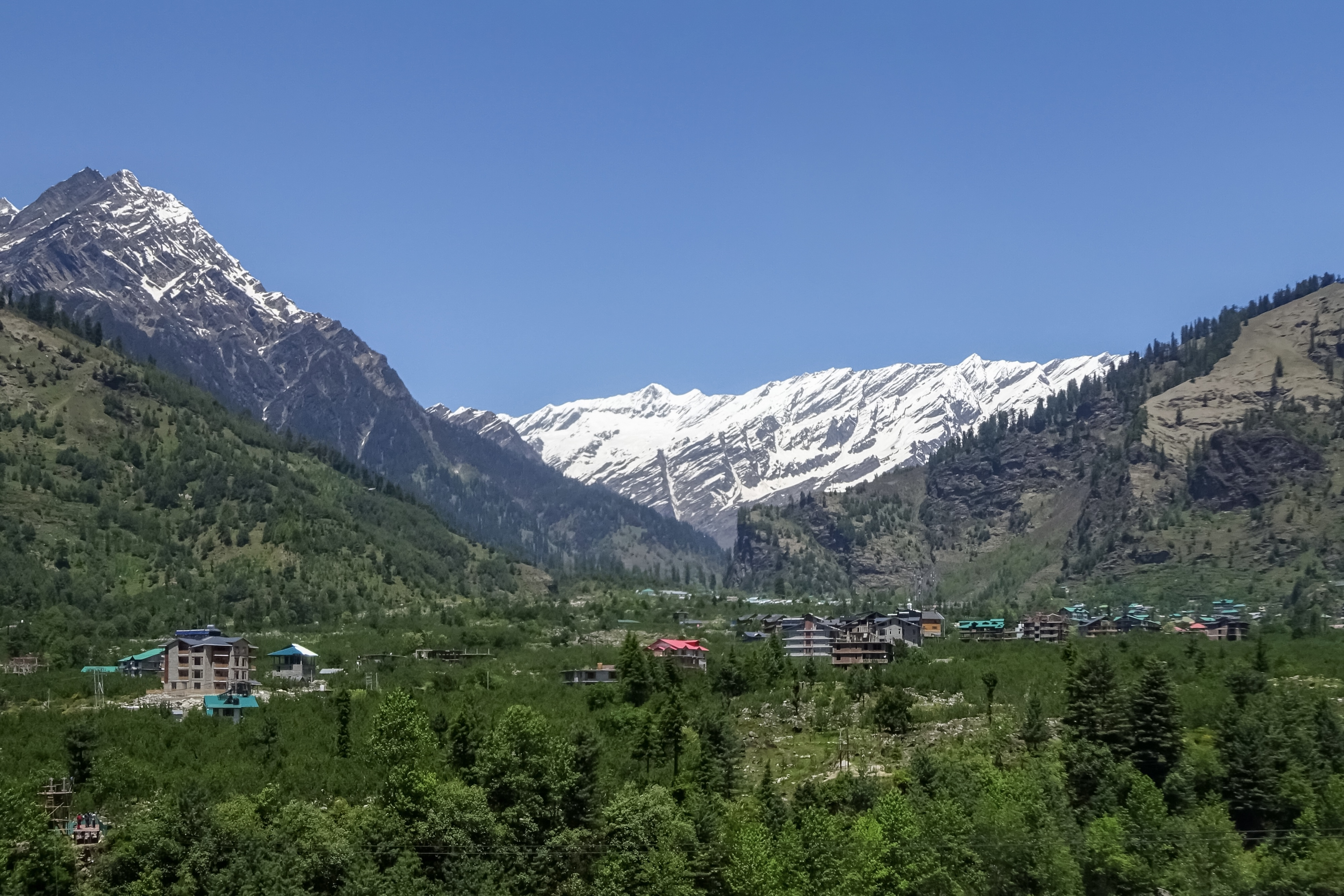
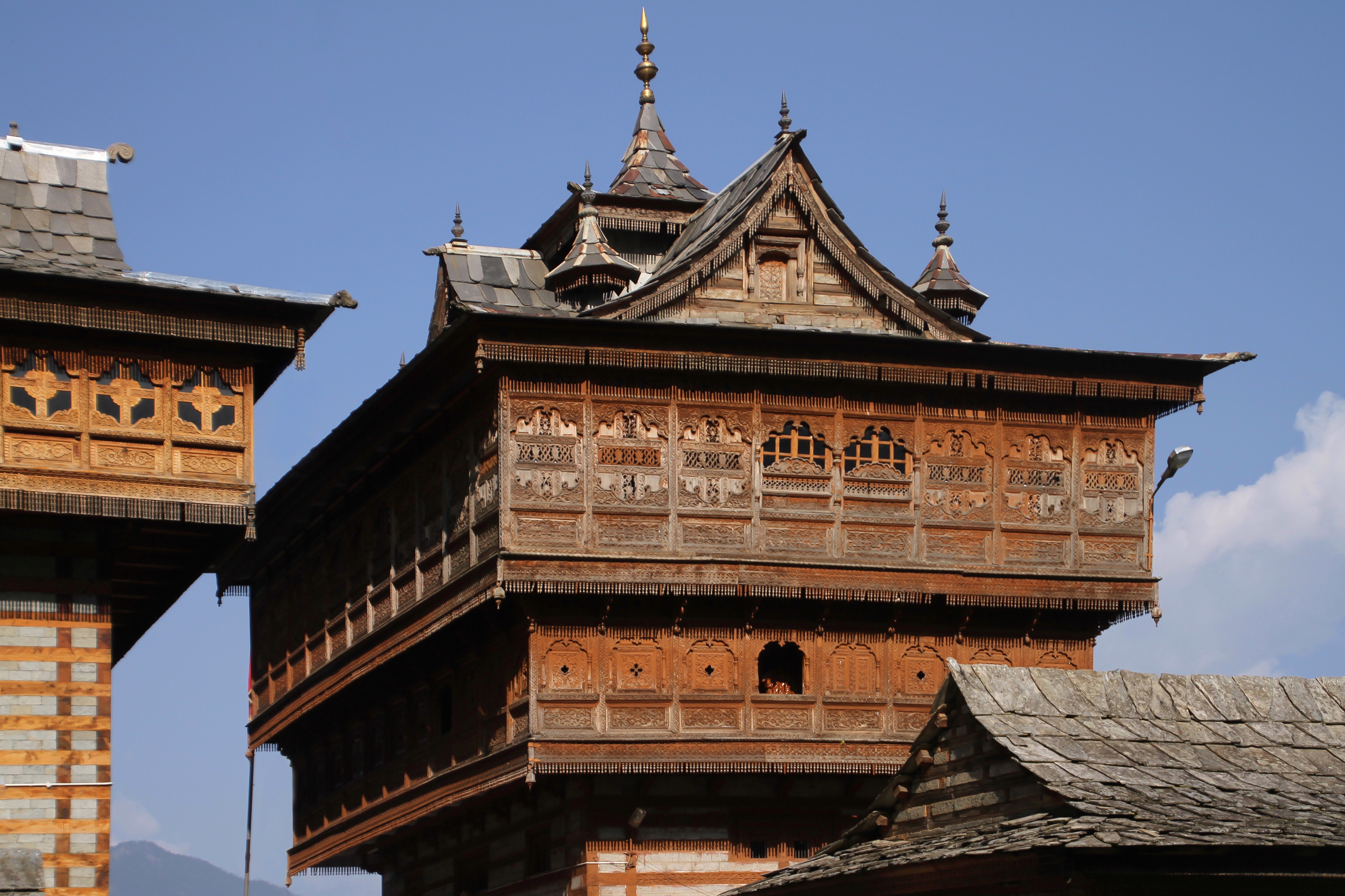
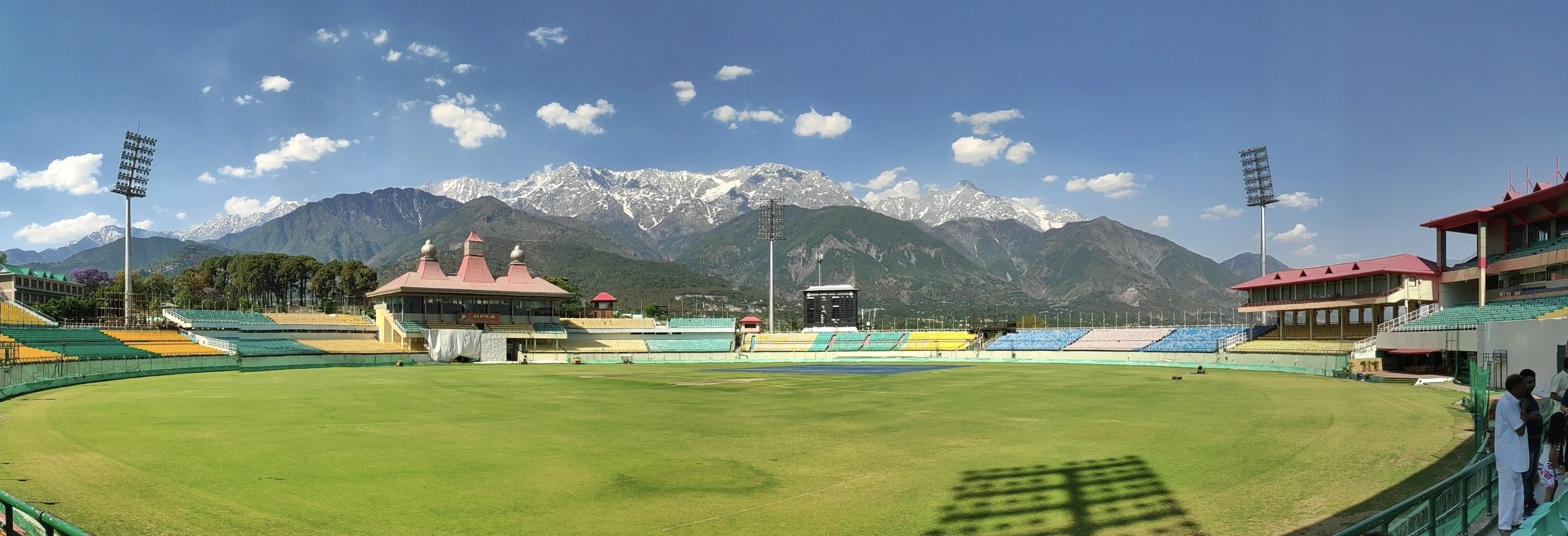
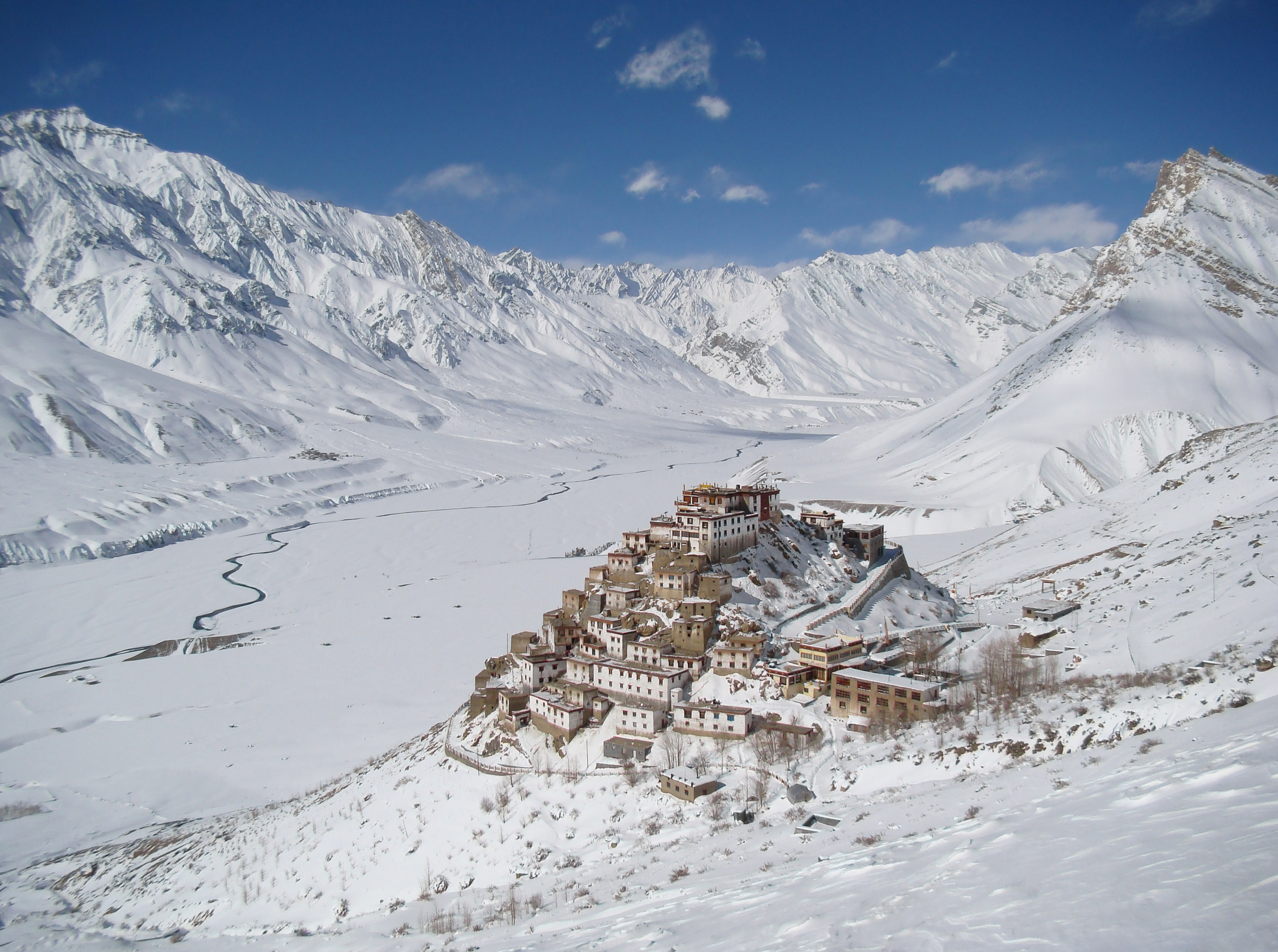
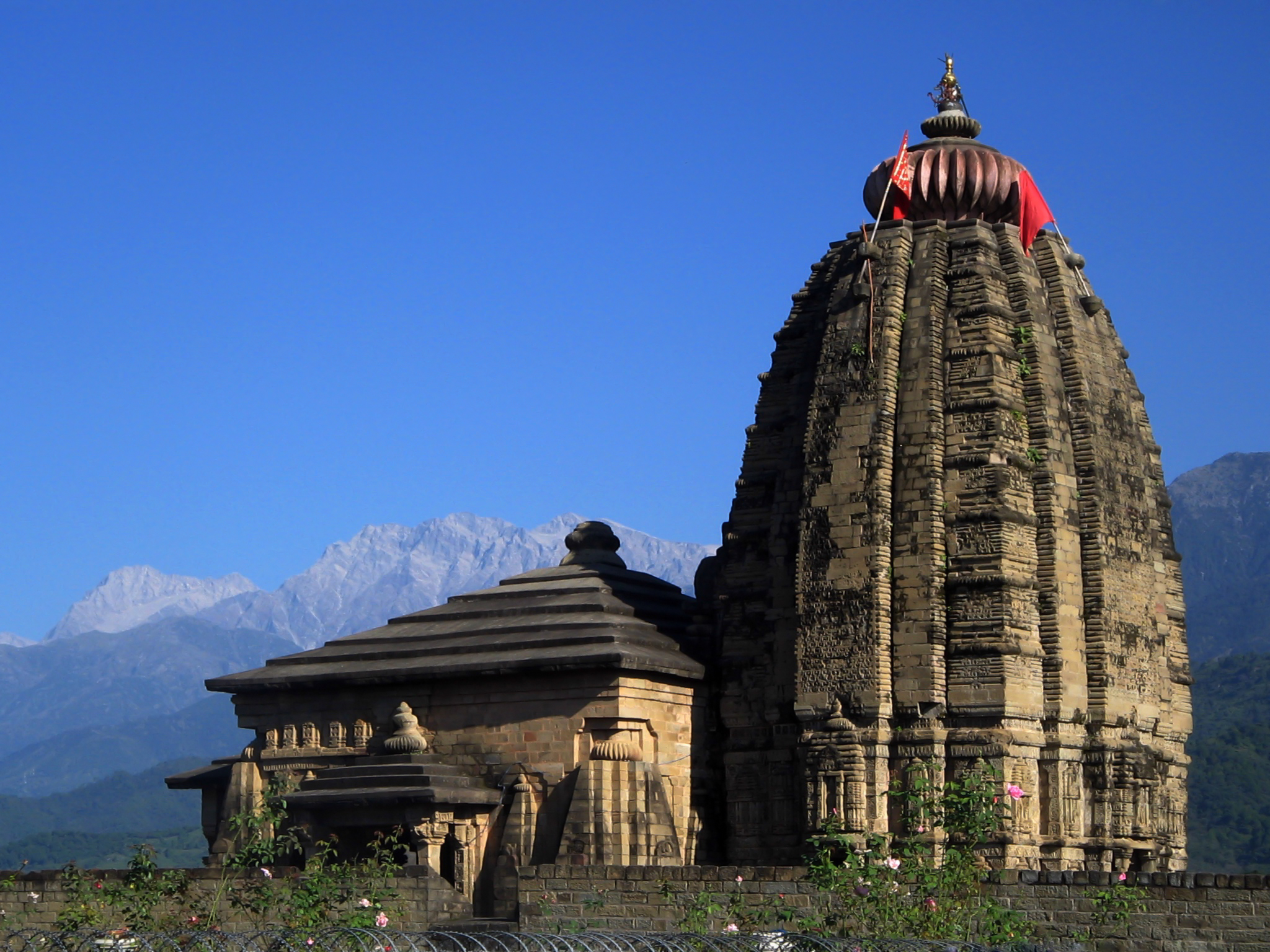
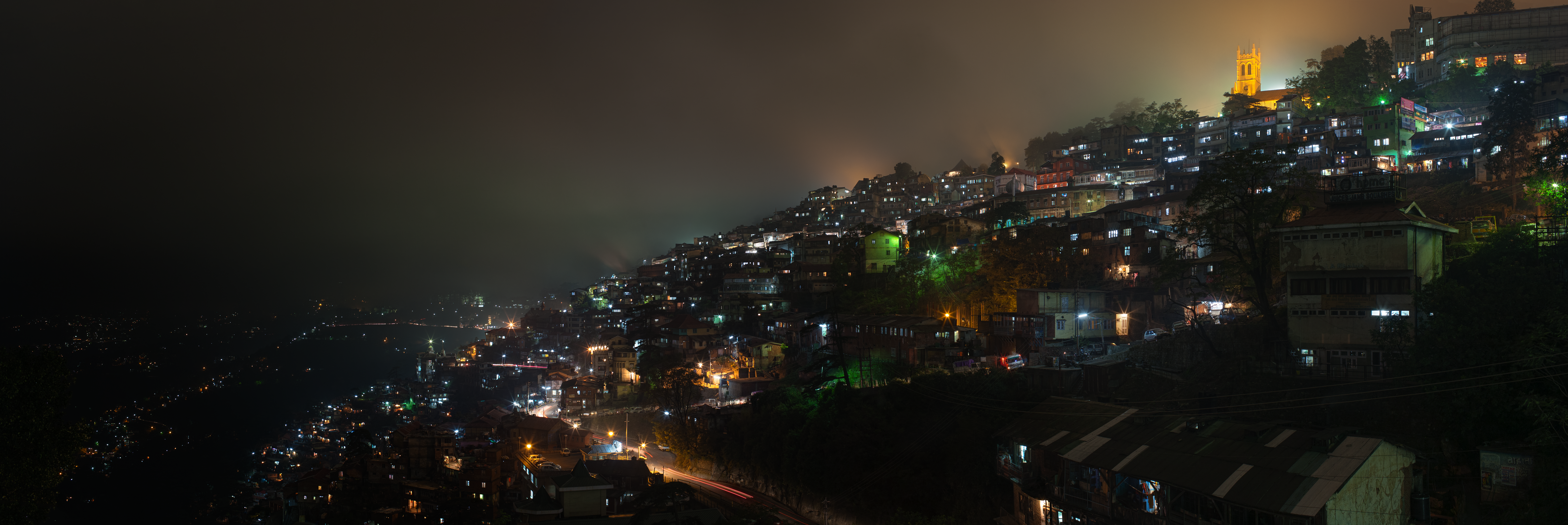
- Kinnaur Kailash range and Kalpa Kullu Valley near Manali Bhimakali Temple in Sarahan HPCA Stadium in Dharamshala Key Monastery at Spiti Baijnath Temple Shimla at Night

- Emblem of Himachal Pradesh
- Etymology: Land of the snow-clad mountains
- Nicknames: Devbhoomi, Veerbhoomi and Urja Pradesh
- Motto: Satyameva Jayate (Sanskrit) "Truth alone triumphs"
- Location of Himachal Pradesh in India
- Coordinates: 31°6′12″N 77°10′20″E
- Country: India
- Region: North India
- Previously was: East Punjab
- As union territory: 1 November 1956
- As state: 25 January 1971
- Formation: 15 April 1948
- Capital: Shimla; Dharamshala (winter)
- Largest city: Shimla
- Districts: 12

Government
  - Body: Government of Himachal Pradesh
  - Governor: Kavinder Gupta
  - Chief Minister: Sukhvinder Singh Sukhu (INC)
  - Deputy Chief Minister: Mukesh Agnihotri (INC)

Area
  - Total: 55,673 km^{2} (21,495 sq mi)
  - Rank: 18th

Dimensions
  - Length: 300 km (190 mi)
  - Width: 200 km (120 mi)
- Highest elevation (Reo Purgyil): 6,816 m (22,362 ft)
- Lowest elevation (Beas River): 232 m (761 ft)

Population (2025)
  - Total: ▲7,555,000
  - Rank: 21st
  - Density: 123/km^{2} (320/sq mi)
  - Urban: 10.03%
  - Rural: 89.97%

Language
  - Official: Hindi
  - Additional official: Sanskrit
  - Official script: Devanagari script

GDP
  - Total (2026–2027): ▲₹2.77 lakh crore (US$30 billion) ▲$136.43 billion (PPP)
  - Rank: 22nd
  - Per capita: ▲₹367,302 (US$3,900) ▲$18,058 (PPP) (16th)
- Time zone: UTC+05:30 (IST)
- ISO 3166 code: IN-HP
- Vehicle registration: HP
- HDI (2025): ▲0.78 High (8th)
- Literacy (2025): 88.8% (12th)
- Sex ratio (2011): 972♀/1000 ♂ (32nd)
- Website: himachal.gov.in
- Symbols of Himachal Pradesh
- Bird: Western tragopan
- Fish: Golden Mahseer
- Flower: Pink rhododendron
- Mammal: Snow leopard
- Tree: Deodar cedar
- State highway mark
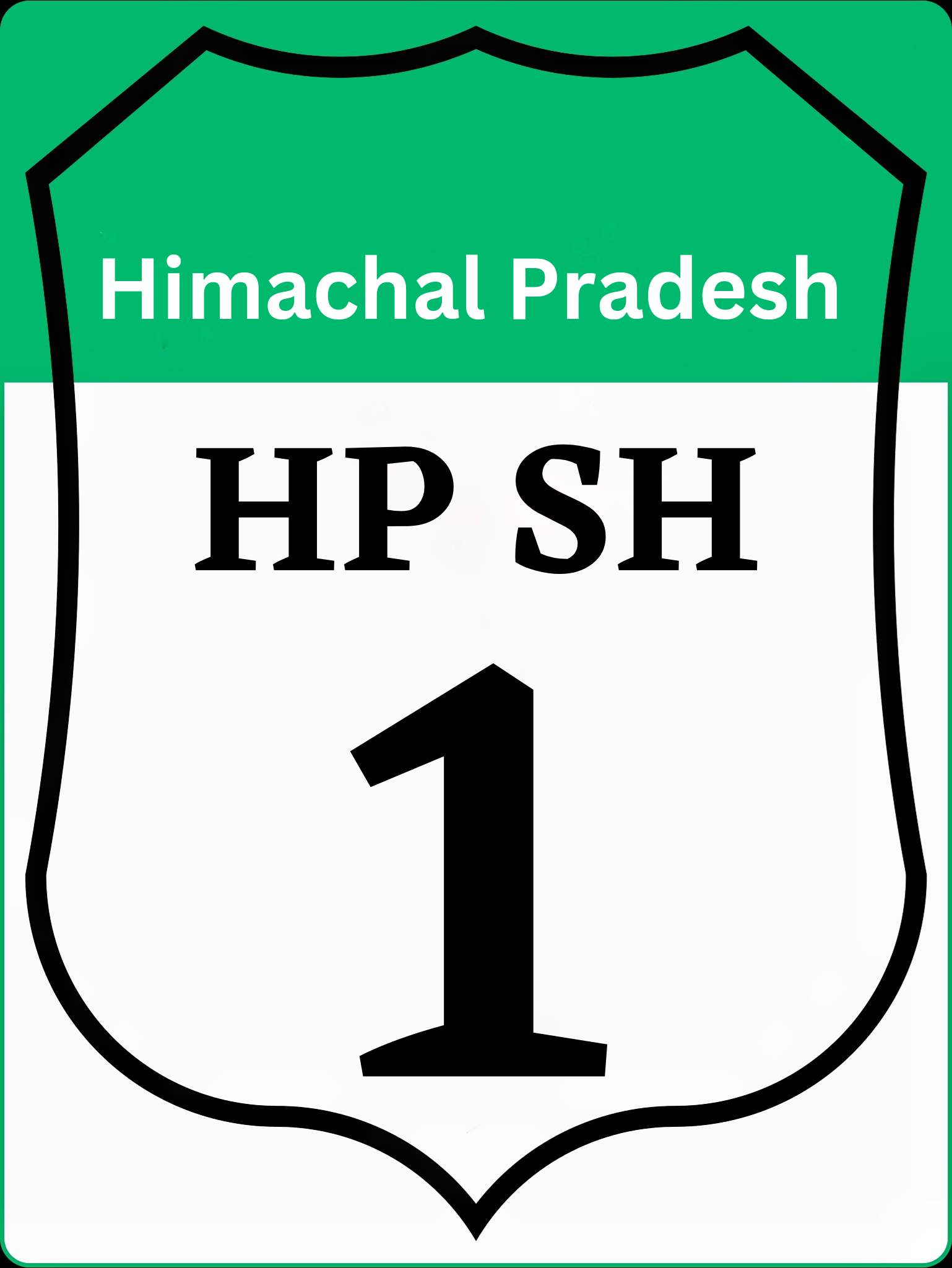
- State highway of Himachal Pradesh; HP SH1 - HP SH43
- List of Indian state symbols

Himachal Pradesh (Hindi: Himācal Pradeś, pronounced [ɦɪˈmäːtʃəl pɾəˈd̪eːʃ]; lit. 'Snow-laden Mountain Province') is a state in the northern part of India. Situated in the Western Himalayas, it is one of the 13 mountain states and is characterised by an extreme landscape featuring several peaks and extensive river systems. Himachal Pradesh is the northernmost state of India and shares borders with the union territories of Jammu and Kashmir and Ladakh to the north, and the states of Punjab to the west, Haryana to the southwest, Uttarakhand to the southeast and a very narrow border with Uttar Pradesh to the south. The state also shares an international border to the east with the Tibet Autonomous Region of China. Himachal Pradesh is also known as Dev Bhoomi, meaning 'Land of Gods' and Veer Bhoomi which means 'Land of the Brave'.

The predominantly mountainous region comprising the present-day Himachal Pradesh has been inhabited since pre-historic times, having witnessed multiple waves of human migrations from other areas. Through its history, the region was mostly ruled by local kingdoms, some of which accepted the suzerainty of larger empires. Prior to India's independence from the British, Himachal comprised the hilly regions of the Punjab Province of British India. After independence, many of the hilly territories were organised as the Chief Commissioner's province of Himachal Pradesh, which later became a Union Territory. In 1966, hilly areas of the neighbouring Punjab state were merged into Himachal and it was ultimately granted full statehood in 1971.

Shimla is the summer capital of Himachal Pradesh, while Dharamshala is the winter capital.

Himachal Pradesh is spread across valleys with many perennial rivers flowing through them. Agriculture, horticulture, hydropower, and tourism are important constituents of the state's economy. The hilly state is almost universally electrified, with 99.5% of households having electricity as of 2016. The state was declared India's second open-defecation-free state in 2016. According to a survey of CMS-India Corruption Study in 2017, Himachal Pradesh is India's least corrupt state. Himachal Pradesh is divided into 12 districts.

In 2026, Himachal Pradesh ranked at the 8th position on the earth in World's most welcoming regions followed by Fredericksburg, USA. In India Himachal Pradesh topped in India's most welcoming regions followed by Kerala and Goa, and Himachal's Bir topped as the most welcoming city in India.

== Etymology ==
The name of the state is a reference to its setting: Himachal means "snowy slopes" (Sanskrit: hima, meaning "snow"; acala/achala, meaning "slopes", or "land", or "abode"). Himachal Pradesh (ɦɪˈmaːtʃəl pɾəˈdeːʃ; literally "snow-laden province"). Himachal refers to being in the "aanchal" of the Himalayas hence; sheltered by the Himalayas or by the snow. It means "the land in the lap of the snowy Himalayas". Pradesh means "state". Himachal was referenced by Diwakar Datt Sharma, a Sanskrit scholar, after independence, when "Jan Gan Man" was revealed publicly by Pt. Nehru from Gurudev Tagore's diary. The word was added in the national anthem of India, "Jan Gan Man", by Gurudev Rabindranath Tagore when he was writing and composing it. Later, after the independence of India, Punjab province was divided and the name was given, officially to the mountain state as Himachal Pradesh.

== History ==
=== Early history ===
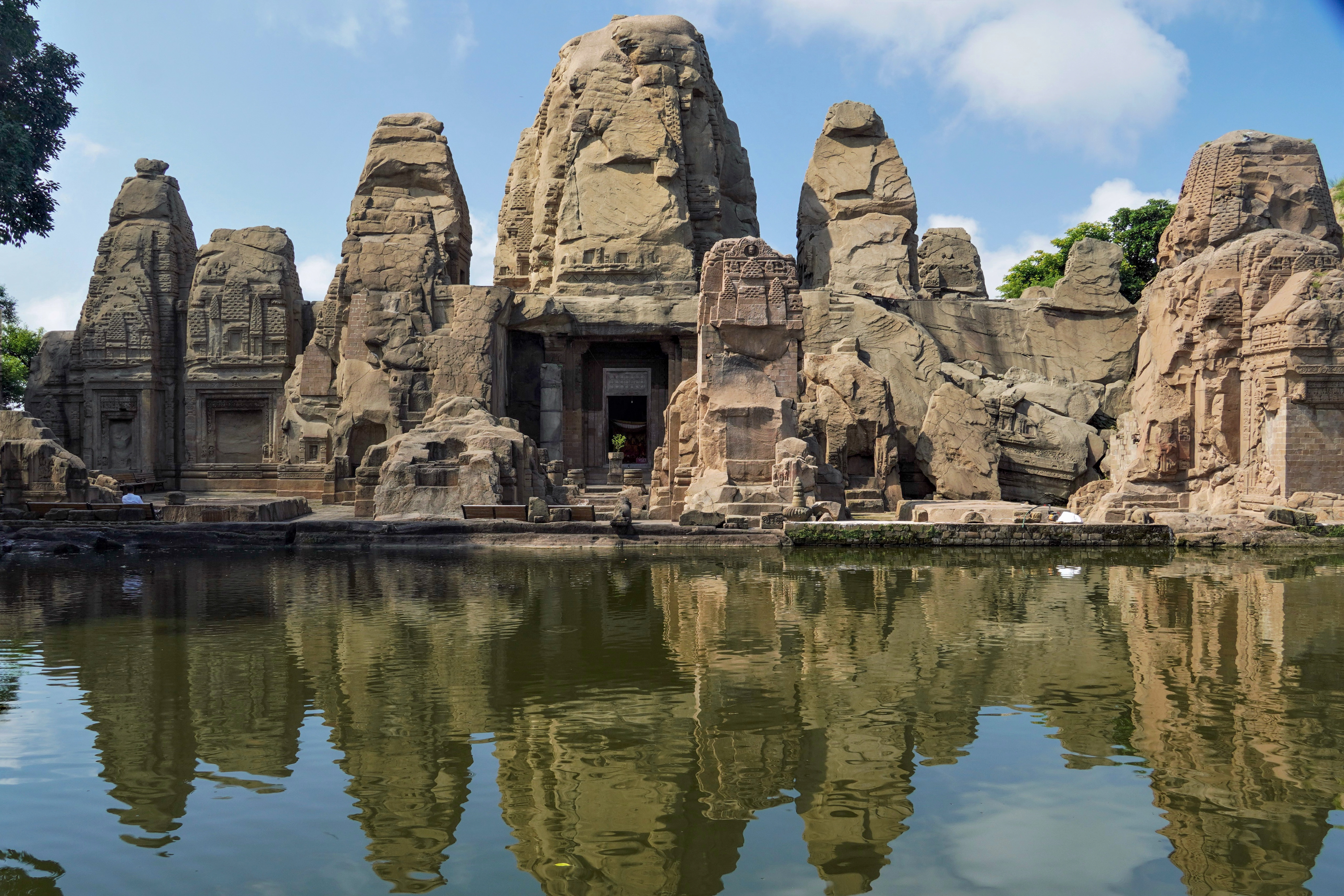
8th-century CE rock-cut temples at Masroor

Tribes such as the Koli, Hali, Dagi, Dhaugri, Dasa, Khasa, Kanaura, and Kirata inhabited the region from the prehistoric era. The foothills of the modern state of Himachal Pradesh were inhabited by people from the Indus Valley Civilisation, which flourished between 2250 and 1750 BCE. The Kols and Mundas are believed to be the original inhabitants to the hills of present-day Himachal Pradesh, followed by the Bhotas and Kiratas.

During the Vedic period, several small republics known as Janapada existed which were later conquered by the Gupta Empire. After a brief period of supremacy by King Harshavardhana, the region was divided into several local powers headed by chieftains, including some Rajput principalities. These kingdoms enjoyed a large degree of independence and were invaded by Delhi Sultanate several times. Mahmud Ghaznavi conquered Kangra at the beginning of the 11th century. Timur and Sikander Lodi also marched through the lower hills of the state, captured several forts, and fought many battles. Several hill states acknowledged Mughal suzerainty and paid regular tribute to the Mughals.

A map of the major Rajput kingdoms in Himachal Pradesh

The Kingdom of Gorkha conquered many kingdoms and came to power in Nepal in 1768. They consolidated their military power and began to expand their territory. Gradually, the Kingdom of Nepal annexed Sirmour and Shimla. Under the leadership of Amar Singh Thapa, the Nepali army laid siege to Kangra. They managed to defeat Sansar Chand Katoch, the ruler of Kangra, in 1806 with the help of many provincial chiefs. However, the Nepali army could not capture Kangra fort which came under Maharaja Ranjit Singh in 1809. After the defeat, they expanded towards the south of the state. However, Raja Ram Singh, Raja of Siba State, captured the fort of Siba from the remnants of Lahore Darbar in Samvat 1846, during the First Anglo-Sikh War.

They came into direct conflict with the British along the tarai belt, after which the British expelled them from the provinces of the Satluj. The British gradually emerged as the paramount power in the region. In the revolt of 1857, or first Indian war of independence, arising from several grievances against the British, the people of the hill states were not as politically active as were those in other parts of the country. They and their rulers, except Bushahr, remained more or less inactive. Some, including the rulers of Chamba, Bilaspur, Bhagal and Dhami, rendered help to the British government during the revolt.

The British territories came under the British Crown after Queen Victoria's proclamation of 1858. The states of Chamba, Mandi and Bilaspur made good progress in many fields during the British rule. During World War I, virtually all rulers of the hill states remained loyal and contributed to the British war effort, both in the form of men and materials. Among these were the states of Kangra, Jaswan, Datarpur, Guler, Rajgarh, Nurpur, Chamba, Suket, Mandi, and Bilaspur.

=== Partition and post-independence ===
After independence, the Chief Commissioner's Province of Himachal Pradesh was organised on 15 April 1948 as a result of the integration of 30 petty princely states (including feudal princes and zaildars) in the promontories of the western Himalayas. These were known as the Simla Hills States and four Punjab southern hill states under the Himachal Pradesh (Administration) Order, 1948 under Sections 3 and 4 of the Extra-Provincial Jurisdiction Act, 1947 (later renamed as the Foreign Jurisdiction Act, 1947 vide A.O. of 1950). The State of Bilaspur was merged into Himachal Pradesh on 1 July 1954 by the Himachal Pradesh and Bilaspur (New State) Act, 1954.

Himachal became a Part 'C' state on 26 January 1950 when the Constitution of India came into effect and the Lieutenant Governor was appointed. The Legislative Assembly was elected in 1952. In July 1954, following the passage of The Himachal Pradesh and Bilaspur (New State) Act, 1954 by an act of Parliament, Bilaspur State was dissolved and incorporated into the State of Himachal Pradesh as Bilaspur district. Himachal Pradesh became a union territory on 1 November 1956. Some areas of the Punjab State, namely, Simla, Kangra, Kullu and Lahul and Spiti Districts, Lohara, Amb and Una Kanungo circles, some areas of Santokhgarh Kanungo circle and some other specified area of Una Tehsil of Hoshiarpur District, as well as Kandaghat and Nalagarh Tehsils of erstwhile PEPSU State, besides some parts of Dhar Kalan Kanungo circle of Pathankot District—were merged with Himachal Pradesh on 1 November 1966 on the enactment by Parliament of the Punjab Reorganisation Act, 1966. On 18 December 1970, the State of Himachal Pradesh Act was passed by Parliament, and the new state came into being on 25 January 1971. Himachal became the 18th state of the Indian Union with Yashwant Singh Parmar as its first chief minister.

== Geography ==
Himachal is in the western Himalayas situated between 30°22′N and 33°12′N latitude and 75°47′E and 79°04′E longitude. Covering an area of 55,673 square kilometres (21,495 mi^{2}), it is a mountainous state. The Zanskar range runs in the northeastern part of the state and the great Himalayan range run through the eastern and northern parts, while the Dhauladhar and the Pir Panjal ranges of the lesser Himalayas, and their valleys, form much of the core regions. The outer Himalayas, or the Shiwalik range, form southern and western Himachal Pradesh. At 6,816 m, Reo Purgyil is the highest mountain peak in the state of Himachal Pradesh.

The drainage system of Himachal is composed of both rivers and glaciers. Himalayan rivers criss-cross the entire mountain chain. Himachal Pradesh provides water to both the Indus and Ganges basins. The drainage systems of the region are the Chandra Bhaga or the Chenab, the Ravi, the Beas, the Sutlej, and the Yamuna. These rivers are perennial and are fed by snow and rainfall. They are protected by an extensive cover of natural vegetation. Four of the five Punjab rivers flow through Himachal Pradesh, three of them originating in the state. These rivers run through a maze of valleys separated by the mountain ranges of the state. The Satluj Valley is formed by the Satluj river entering the state near Shipki La, while the Spiti and Baspa Valleys are formed by the river's two major tributaries in the state. The Beas river flows though the Kullu and the Kangra Valleys, with tributary Parvati forming the Parvati Valley. The Chenab river, formed by the confluence of the Chandra and Bhaga, forms much of the northern regions of Lahaul and Pangi, and the Ravi river flows principally through Chamba. The Pabbar and Giri rivers in the southeast are part of the Yamuna basin.

Due to extreme variation in elevation, great variation occurs in the climatic conditions of Himachal Pradesh. The climate varies from hot and humid subtropical in the southern tracts to, with more elevation, cold, alpine, and glacial in the northern and eastern mountain ranges. The state's winter capital, Dharamsala receives very heavy rainfall, while areas like Lahaul and Spiti are cold and almost rainless. Broadly, Himachal experiences three seasons: summer, winter, and rainy season. Summer lasts from mid-April until the end of June and most parts become very hot (except in the alpine zone which experiences a mild summer) with the average temperature ranging from 28 to 32 °C (82 to 90 °F). Winter lasts from late November until mid-March. Snowfall is common in alpine tracts. Pollution is affecting the climate of almost all the states of India. Due to steps taken by governments to prevent pollution, Himachal Pradesh has become the first smoke-free state in India which means cooking in the entire state is free of traditional chulhas.

Topographic map of Himachal Pradesh. Most of the state is mountainous.

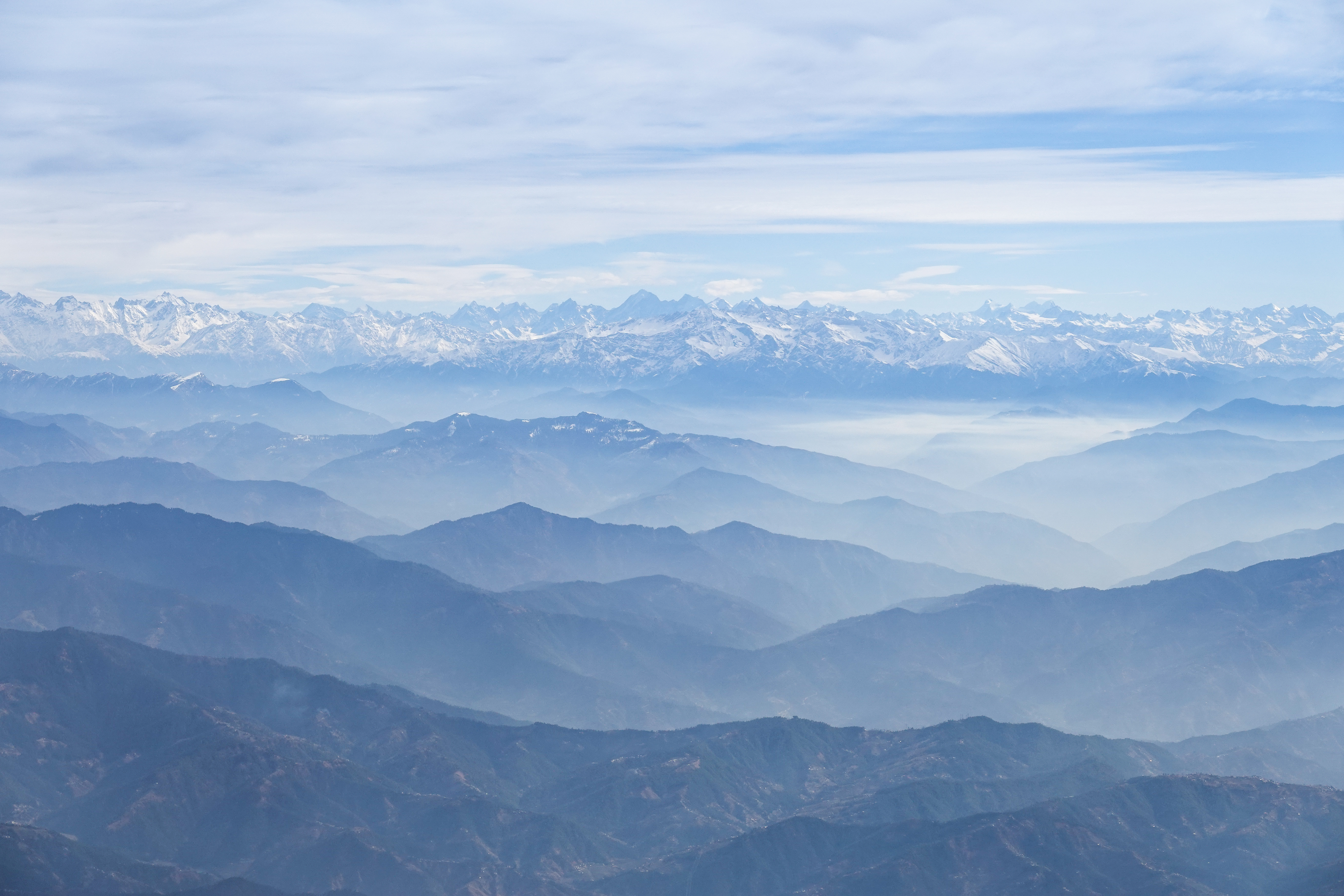
View of the Shivalik Hills and the Middle Himalayas in Himachal Pradesh

In a statement on 29 March 2025, Town and Country Planning Minister, Rajesh Dharmani, highlighted the state government's policy of sustainable development, citing the "Green Himachal vision" and ongoing efforts to meet sustainable development goals.

=== Flora and fauna ===
Himachal Pradesh is one of the states that lies in the Indian Himalayan Region (IHR), one of the richest reservoirs of biological diversity in the world. As of 2002, the IHR is undergoing large scale irrational extraction of wild, medicinal herbs, thus endangering many of its high-value gene stock. To address this, a workshop on 'Endangered Medicinal Plant Species in Himachal Pradesh' was held in 2002 and the conference was attended by forty experts from diverse disciplines.

According to 2003 Forest Survey of India report, legally defined forest areas constitute 66.52% of the area of Himachal Pradesh. Vegetation in the state is dictated by elevation and precipitation. The state is endowed with a high diversity of medicinal and aromatic plants. Lahaul-Spiti region of the state, being a cold desert, supports unique plants of medicinal value including Ferula jaeschkeana, Hyoscyamus niger, Lancea tibetica, and Saussurea bracteata.

Himachal is also said to be the fruit bowl of the country, with widespread orchards. Meadows and pastures are also seen clinging to steep slopes. After the winter season, the hillsides and orchards bloom with wild flowers, white gladiolas, carnations, marigolds, roses, chrysanthemums, tulips and lilies are carefully cultivated. Himachal Pradesh Horticultural Produce Marketing and Processing Corporation Ltd. (HPMC) is a state body that markets fresh and processed fruits.

Himachal Pradesh has around 463 birds, and Tragopan melanocephalus is the state bird of Himanchal Pradesh 77 mammalian, 44 reptile and 80 fish species. Himachal Pradesh has currently five National Parks. Great Himalayan National Park, which is the oldest and largest National park in the state, is a UNESCO World Heritage Site. Pin Valley National Park, Inderkilla, Khirganga and Simbalbara are the other national Parks located in the state. The state also has 30 wildlife sanctuaries and 3 conservation reserves. The state bird of Himachal Pradesh is the Western tragopan, locally known as the jujurana. It is one of the rarest living pheasants in the world. The state animal is the snow leopard, which is even rarer to find than the jujurana.

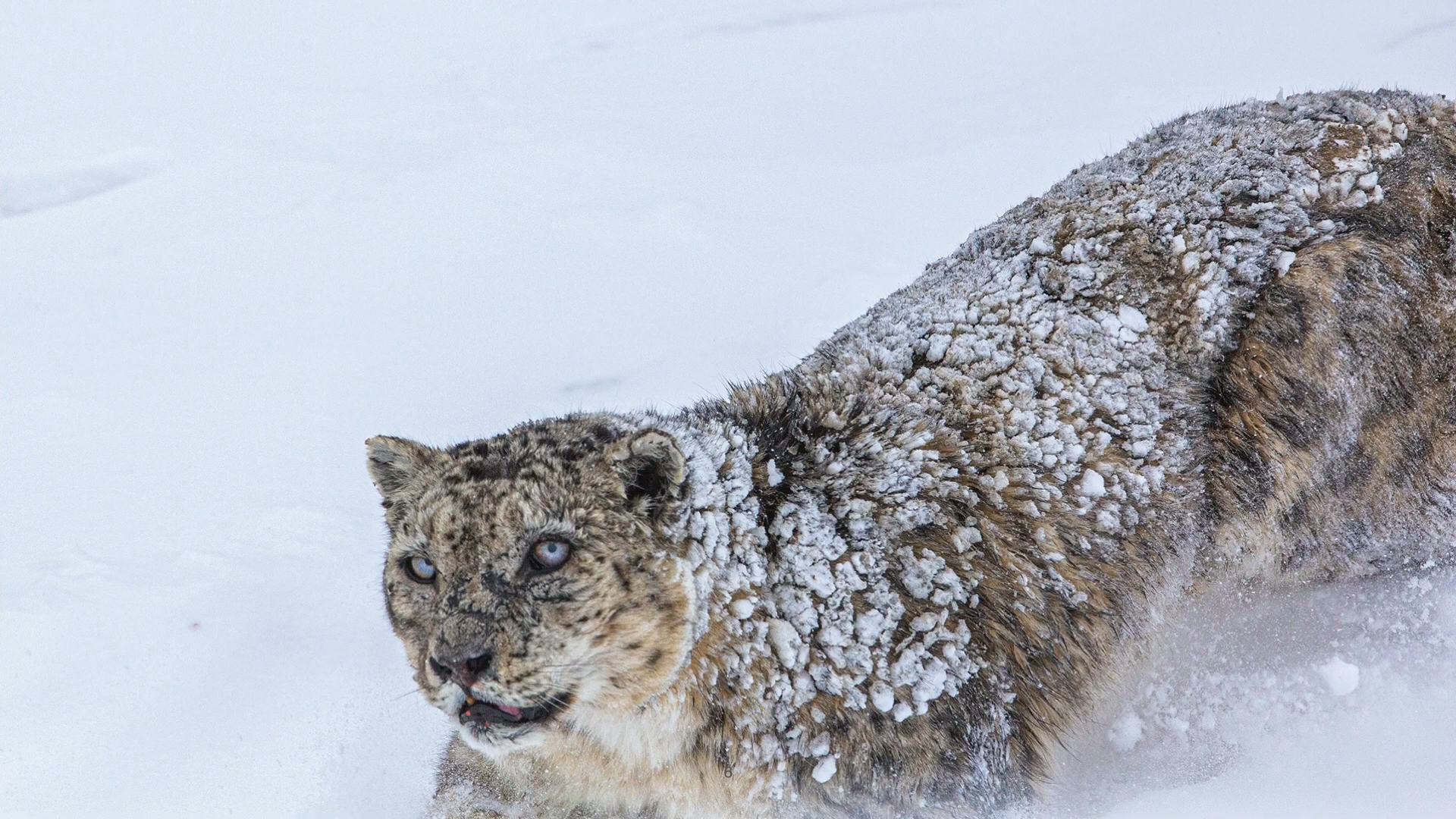
Snow leopard (Panthera uncia) in Spiti

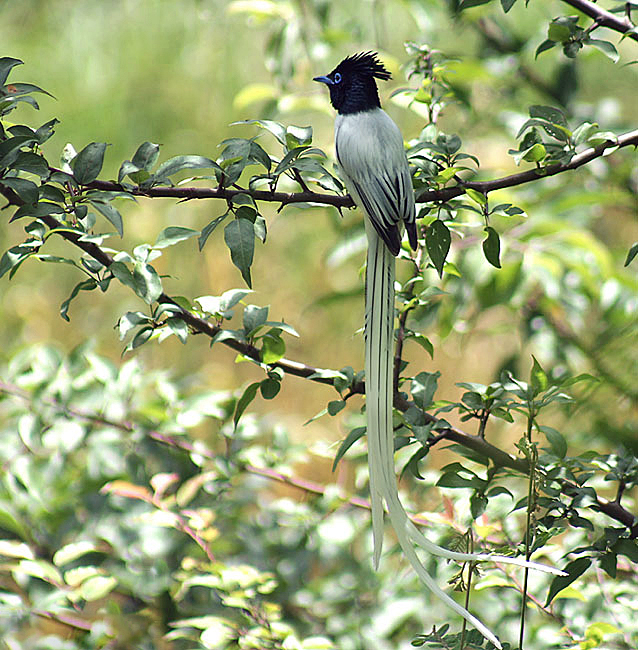
Indian paradise flycatcher (Terpsiphone paradisi) in Kullu

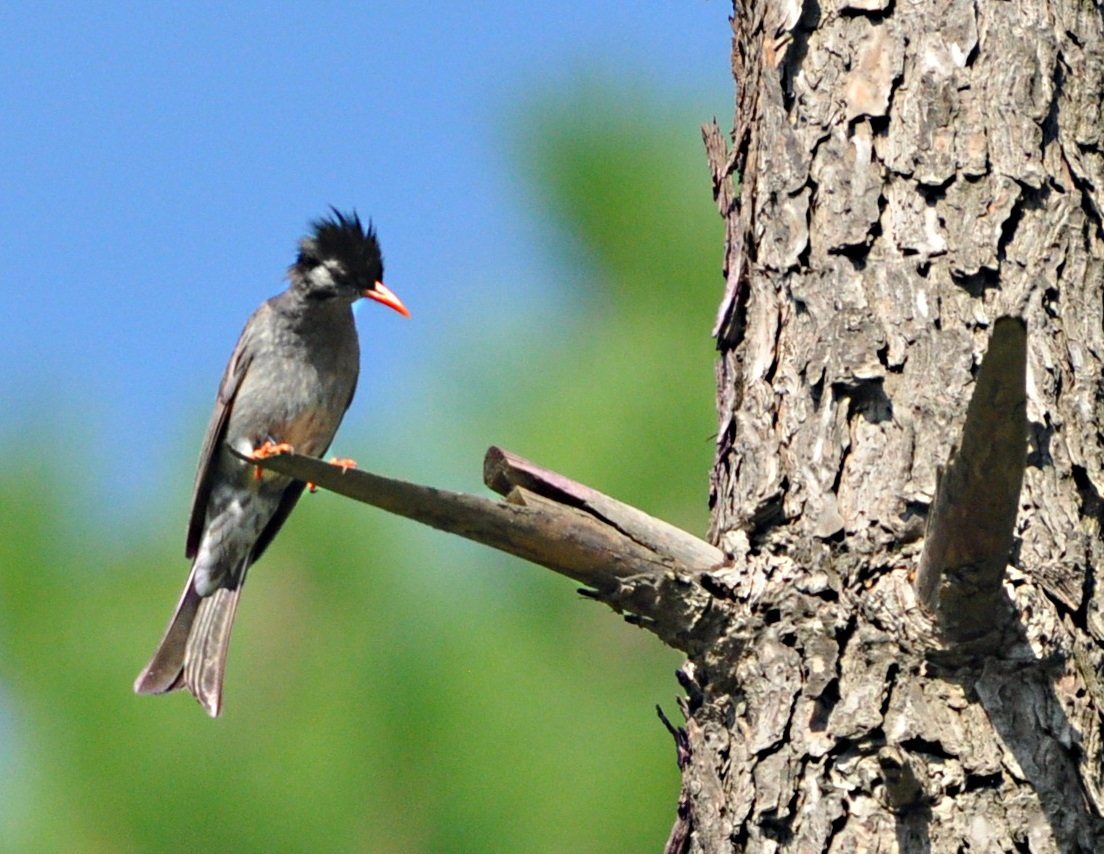
Black bulbul (Hypsipetes leucocephalus)

== Government ==
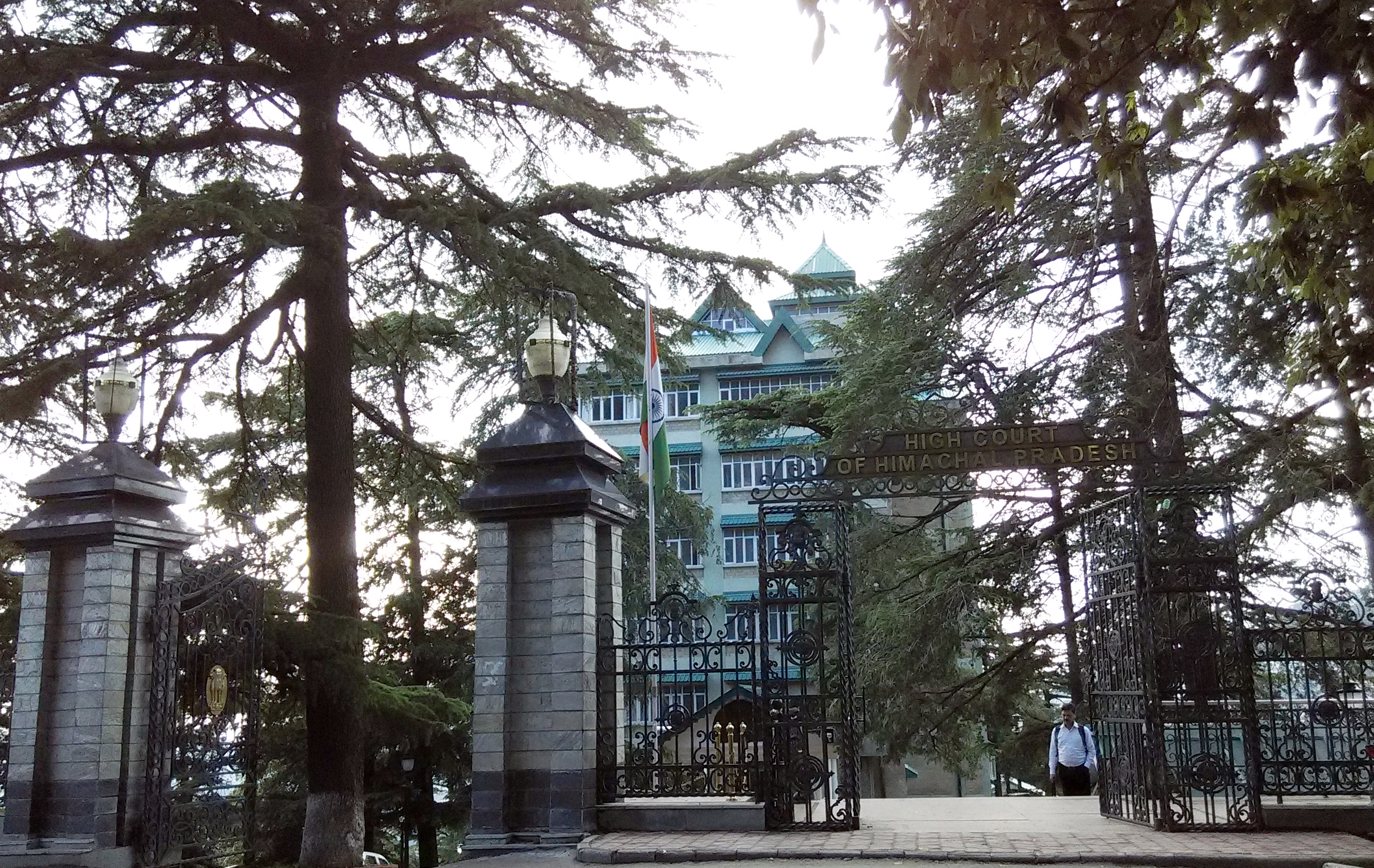
High Court of Himachal Pradesh

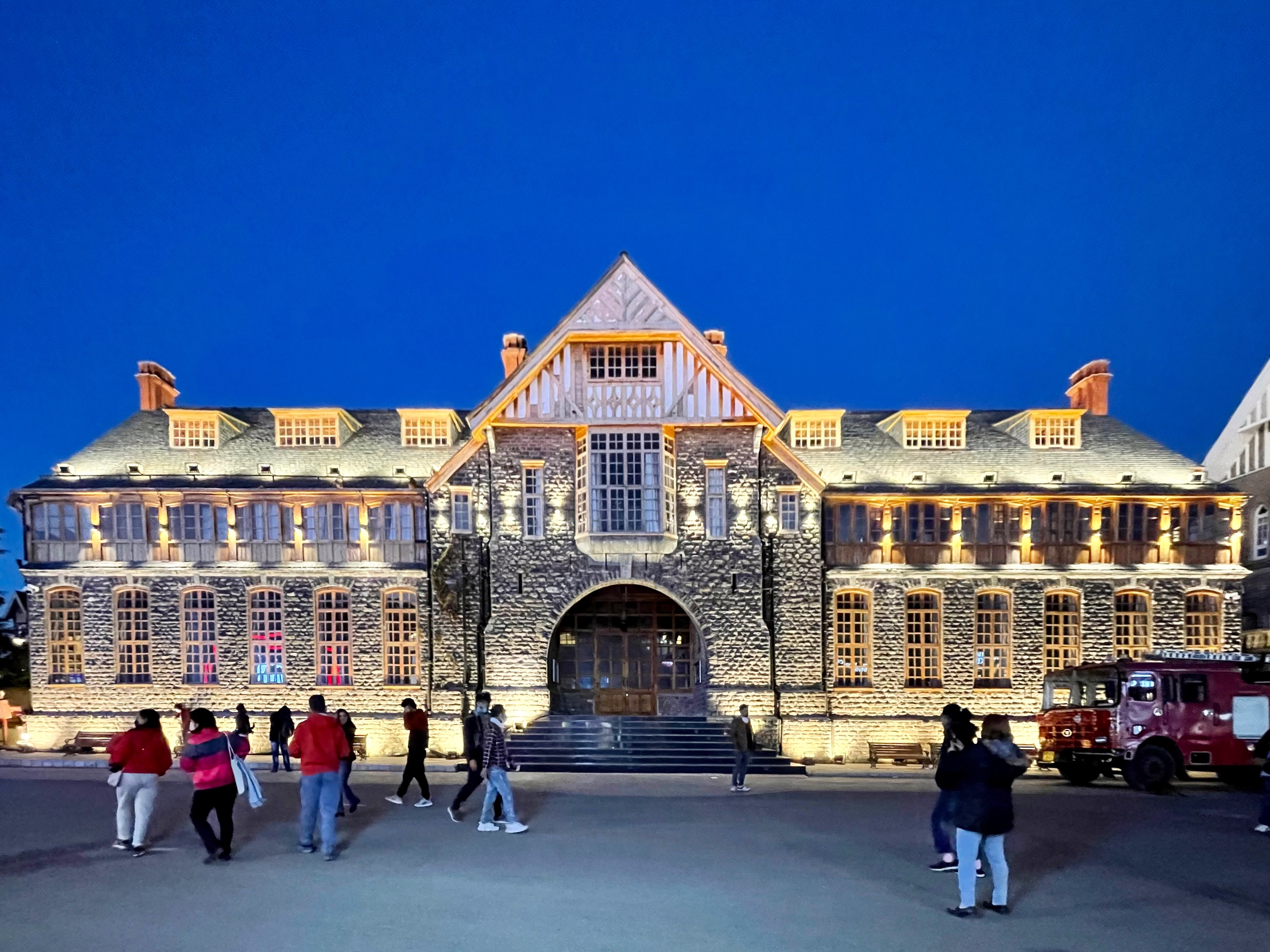
Shimla's Town Hall, which houses the Shimla Municipal Corporation

The Legislative Assembly of Himachal Pradesh has no pre-constitution history. The State itself is a post-independence creation. It came into being as a centrally administered territory on 15 April 1948 from the integration of thirty erstwhile princely states.

Himachal Pradesh is governed through a parliamentary system of representative democracy, a feature the state shares with other Indian states. Universal suffrage is granted to residents. The legislature consists of elected members and special office bearers such as the Speaker and the Deputy Speaker who are elected by the members. Assembly meetings are presided over by the Speaker or the Deputy Speaker in the Speaker's absence. The judiciary is composed of the Himachal Pradesh High Court and a system of lower courts.

Executive authority is vested in the Council of Ministers headed by the Chief Minister, although the titular head of government is the Governor. The governor is the head of state appointed by the President of India. The leader of the party or coalition with a majority in the Legislative Assembly is appointed as the Chief Minister by the governor, and the Council of Ministers are appointed by the governor on the advice of the Chief Minister. The Council of Ministers reports to the Legislative Assembly. The Assembly is unicameral with 68 Members of the Legislative Assembly (MLA). Terms of office run for five years, unless the Assembly is dissolved prior to the completion of the term. Auxiliary authorities known as panchayats, for which local body elections are regularly held, govern local affairs.

In the assembly elections held in November 2022, the Indian National Congress secured an absolute majority, winning 40 of the 68 seats while the BJP won only 25 of the 68 seats. Sukhvinder Singh Sukhu was sworn in as Himachal Pradesh's 15th Chief Minister in Shimla on 11 December 2022. Mukesh Agnihotri was sworn in as his deputy the same day.

== Administrative divisions ==
Districts of Himachal Pradesh

The state of Himachal Pradesh is divided into 12 districts which are grouped into three divisions, Shimla, Kangra and Mandi. The districts are further divided into 73 subdivisions, 78 blocks and 172 Tehsils.

| Divisions | Districts |
|---|---|
| Kangra | Chamba, Kangra, Una |
| Mandi | Bilaspur, Hamirpur, Kullu, Lahaul and Spiti, Mandi |
| Shimla | Kinnaur, Shimla, Sirmaur, Solan |

| Administrative Structure | |
|---|---|
| Divisions | 3 |
| Districts | 12 |
| Tehsils/ Sub-Tehsils | 172 |
| Developmental Blocks | 78 |
| Urban Local Bodies | 54 |
| Towns | 59 |
| Gram Panchayats | 3615 |
| Villages | 20690 |
| Police Stations | 130 |
| Lok Sabha seats | 4 |
| Rajya Sabha seats | 3 |
| Assembly Constituencies | 68 |

== Economy ==
Gross State Domestic Product at Current Prices: figures in crores of Indian rupees
| Year | Gross State Domestic Product |
|---|---|
| 1980 | 794 |
| 1985 | 1,372 |
| 1990 | 2,815 |
| 1995 | 6,698 |
| 2000 | 13,590 |
| 2005 | 23,024 |
| 2006 | 25,435 |
| 2010 | 57,452 |
| 2013 | 82,585 |
| 2014 | 92,589 |
| 2015 | 101,108 |
| 2016 | 110,511 |
| 2017 | 124,570 |
| 2018 | 135,914 |
| 2021 | 172,174 |
| 2024 | 232,185 |

Planning in Himachal Pradesh started in 1951 along with the rest of India with the implementation of the first five-year plan. The First Plan allocated ₹52.7 million to Himachal Pradesh. More than 50% of this expenditure was incurred on transport and communication; while the power sector got a share of just 4.6%, though it had steadily increased to 7% by the Third Plan. Expenditure on agriculture and allied activities increased from 14.4% in the First Plan to 32% in the Third Plan, showing a progressive decline afterwards from 24% in the Fourth Plan to less than 10% in the Tenth Plan. Expenditure on energy sector was 24.2% of the total in the Tenth Plan.

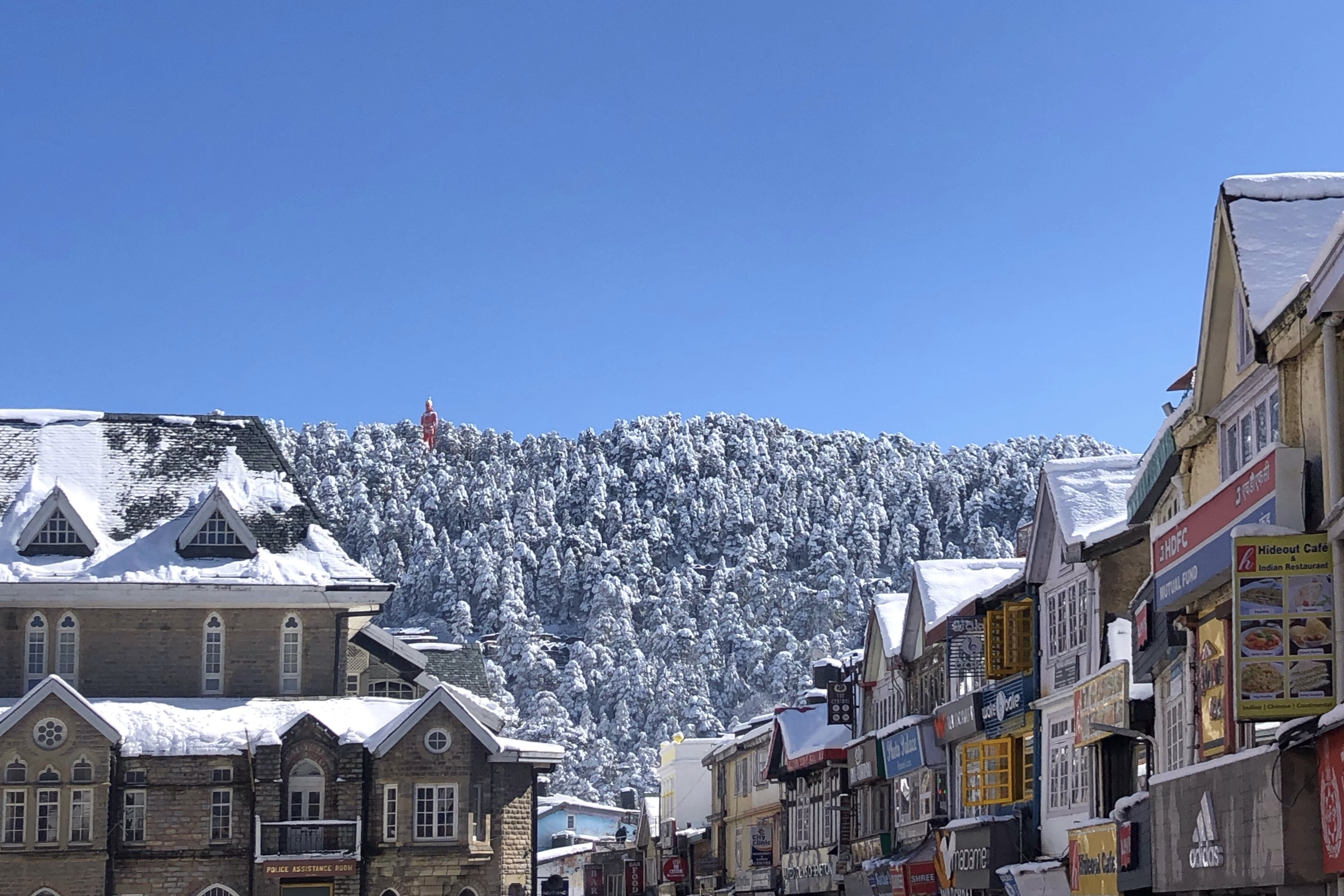
The Mall Road is the central business district of Shimla, Himachal Pradesh's capital city.

The total GDP for 2005–06 was estimated at ₹254 billion as against ₹230 billion in the year 2004–05, showing an increase of 10.5%. The GDP for fiscal 2015–16 was estimated at ₹1.110 trillion, which increased to ₹1.247 trillion in 2016–17, recording growth of 6.8%. The per capita income increased from ₹130,067 in 2015–16 to ₹147,277 in 2016–17. The state government's advance estimates for fiscal 2017–18 stated the total GDP and per capita income as ₹1.359 trillion and ₹158,462, respectively. As of 2018, Himachal is the 22nd-largest state economy in India with ₹1.52 lakh crore (US$16 billion) in gross domestic product and has the 13th-highest per capita income (₹160,000 (US$1,700)) among the states and union territories of India.

Himachal Pradesh also ranks as the second-best performing state in the country on human development indicators after Kerala. One of the Indian government's key initiatives to tackle unemployment is the National Rural Employment Guarantee Act (NREGA). The participation of women in the NREGA has been observed to vary across different regions of the nation. As of the year 2009–2010, Himachal Pradesh joined the category of high female participation, recording a 46% share of NREGS (National Rural Employment Guarantee Scheme) workdays for women. This was a drastic increase from the 13% that was recorded in 2006–2007.

=== Agriculture ===
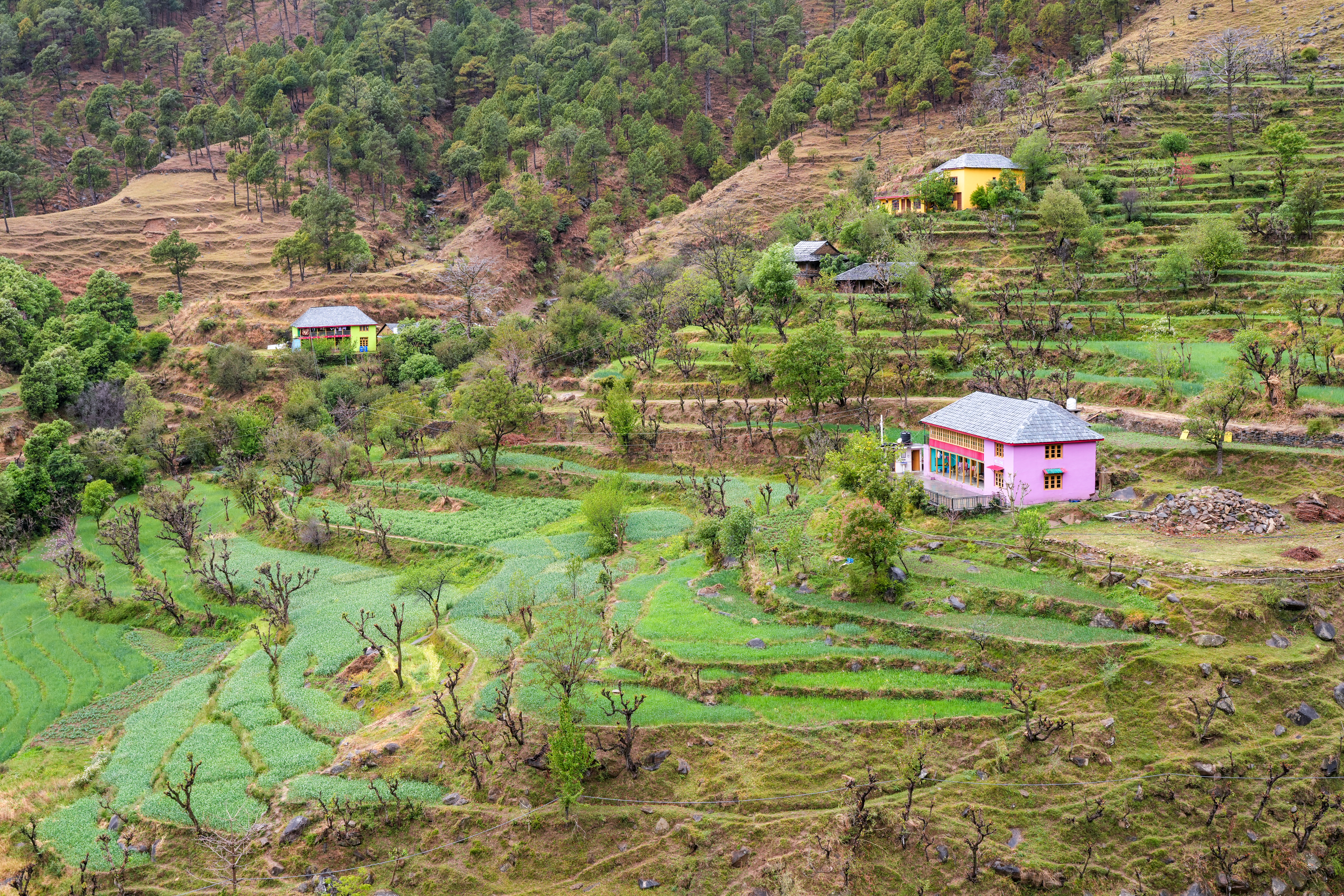
Terrace farming is the most common form of agricultural practice in the state.

Agriculture accounts for 9.4% of the net state domestic product. It is the main source of income and employment in Himachal. About 90% of the population in Himachal depends directly upon agriculture, which provides direct employment to 62% of total workers of state. The main cereals grown include wheat, maize, rice and barley with major cropping systems being maize-wheat, rice-wheat and maize-potato-wheat. Pulses, fruits, vegetables and oilseeds are among the other crops grown in the state. Centuries-old traditional Kuhl irrigation system is prevalent in the Kangra valley, though in recent years these Kuhls have come under threat from hydroprojects on small streams in the valley. Land husbandry initiatives such as the Mid-Himalayan Watershed Development Project, which includes the Himachal Pradesh Reforestation Project (HPRP), the world's largest clean development mechanism (CDM) undertaking, have improved agricultural yields and productivity, and raised rural household incomes.

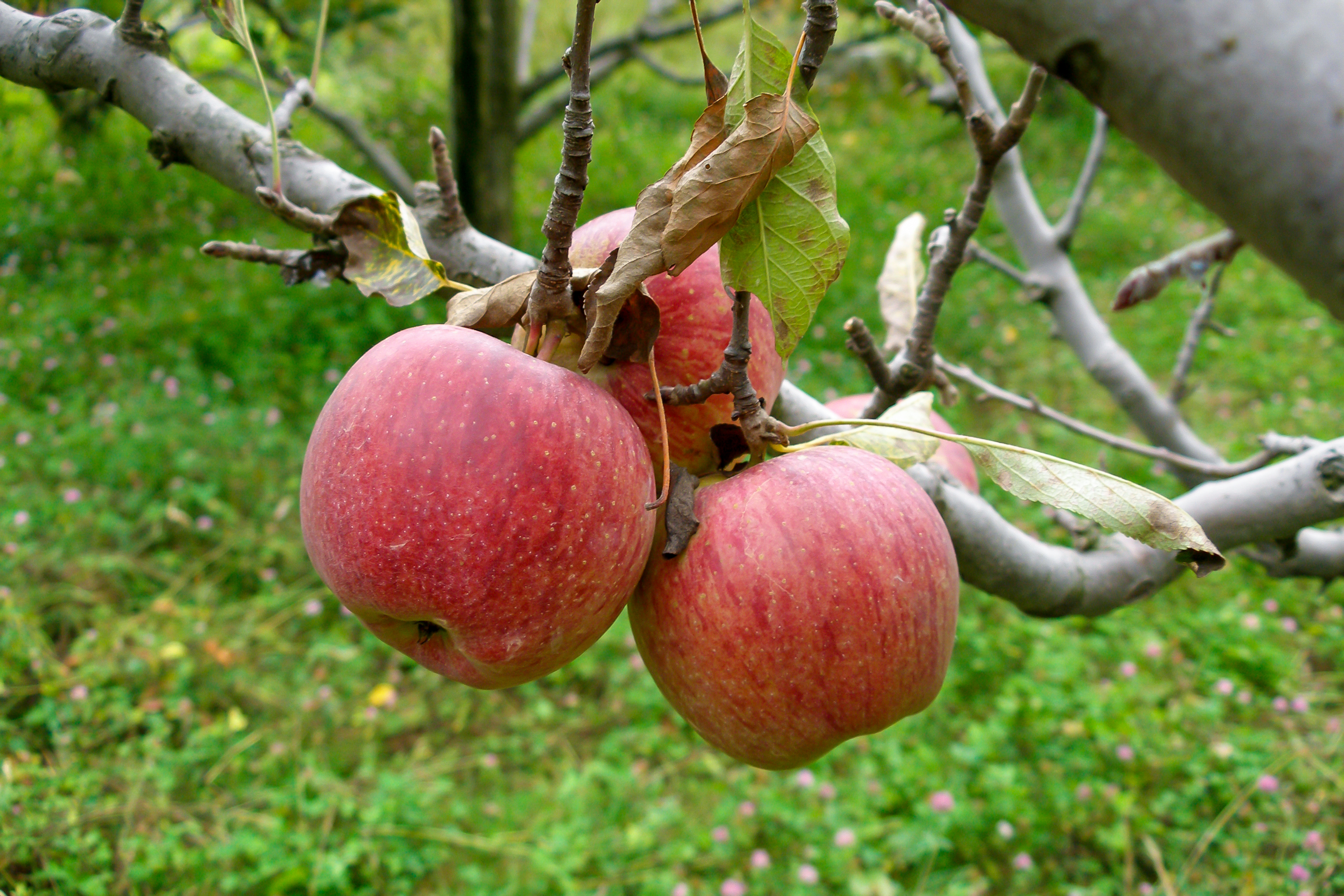
Apples at an orchard in Vashisht; the state is the second-largest producer of apples in India

Apple is the principal cash crop of the state grown principally in the districts of Shimla, Kinnaur, Kullu, Mandi, Chamba and some parts of Sirmaur and Lahaul-Spiti with an average annual production of five lakh tonnes and per hectare production of 8 to 10 tonnes. The apple cultivation constitute 49 per cent of the total area under fruit crops and 85% of total fruit production in the state with an estimated economy of ₹3500 crore. Apples from Himachal are exported to other Indian states and even other countries. In 2011–12, the total area under apple cultivation was 104,000 hectares, increased from 90,347 hectares in 2000–01. According to the provisional estimates of Ministry of Agriculture & Farmers Welfare, the annual apple production in Himachal for fiscal 2015–16 stood at 753,000 tonnes, making it India's second-largest apple-producing state after Jammu and Kashmir. The state is also among the leading producers of other fruits such as apricots, cherries, peaches, pears, plums and strawberries in India.

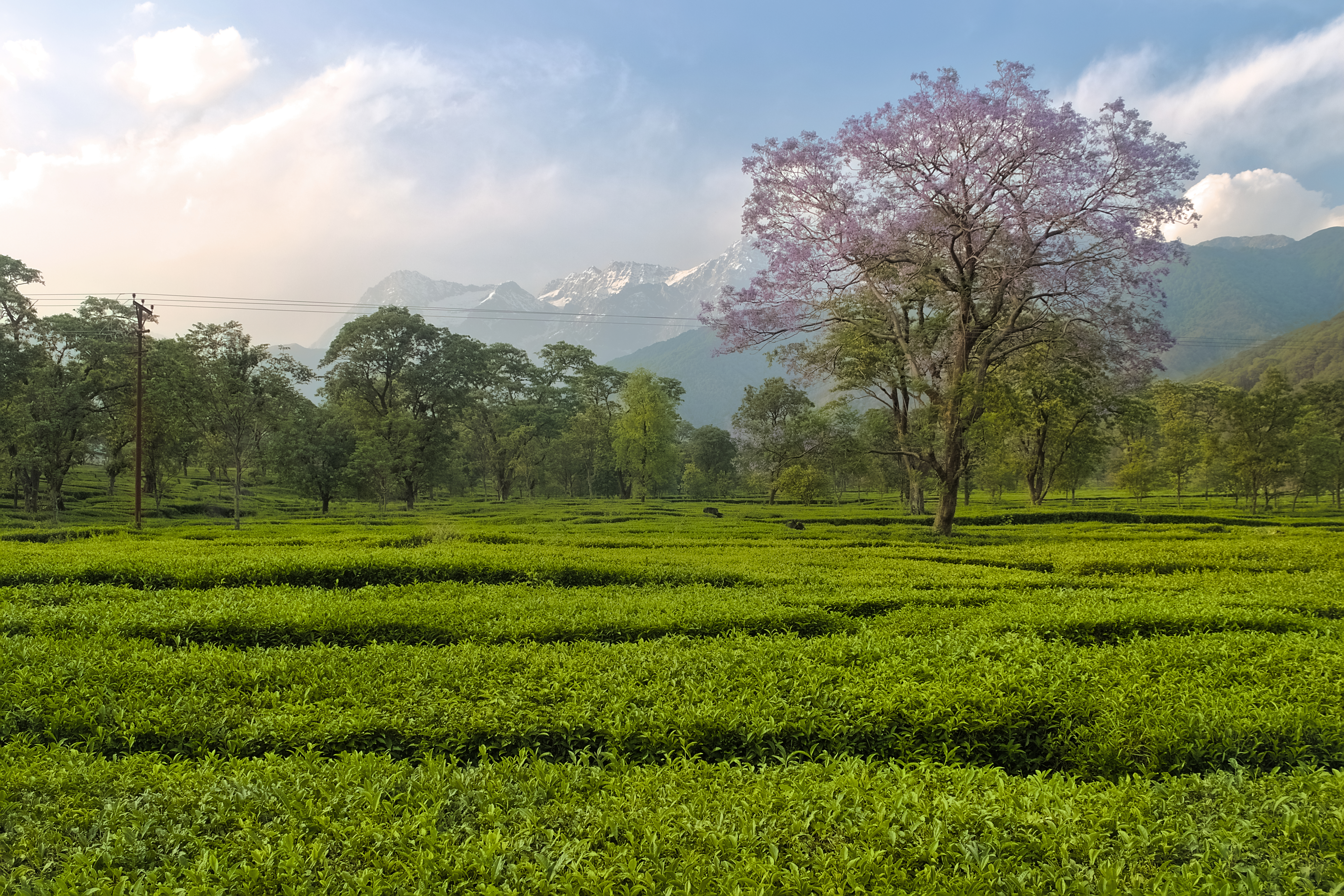
Kangra tea plantation near Palampur

Kangra tea is grown in the Kangra valley. Tea plantation began in 1849, and production peaked in the late 19th century with the tea becoming popular across the globe, especially for consumption in northwestern India and for export to Central Asia. Production dipped sharply after the 1905 Kangra earthquake and continues to decline. Attempts have been made in the late 20th and early 21st centuries to revive production. The tea received geographical indication status in 2005.

=== Industry ===
==== Pharma hub ====
Himachal Pradesh is renowned as Asia's pharmaceutical hub, housing a total of 652 pharmaceutical units. The state hosts a thriving ₹40,000 crore drug manufacturing industry.

=== Energy ===
Hydropower is one of the major sources of income generation for the state. The state has an abundance of hydropower resources because of the presence of various perennial rivers. Many high-capacity hydropower plants have been constructed which produce surplus electricity that is sold to other states, such as Delhi, Punjab and West Bengal. The income generated from exporting the electricity to other states is being provided as subsidy to the consumers in the state. The rich hydropower resources of Himachal have resulted in the state becoming almost universally electrified with around 94.8% houses receiving electricity as of 2001, as compared to the national average of 55.9%. Himachal's hydro-electric power production is, however, yet to be fully utilised. The identified hydroelectric potential for the state is 27,436 MW in five river basins while the hydroelectric capacity in 2016 was 10,351 MW.

== Tourism ==
Tourism in Himachal Pradesh is a major contributor to the state's economy and growth. The Himalayas attracts tourists from all over the world. Hill stations like Shimla, Manali, Dharamshala, Dalhousie, Chamba, Khajjiar, Kullu and Kasauli are popular destinations for both domestic and foreign tourists. The state has 5 Shakti Peeths - Chintpurni, Jwalamukhi Temple, Bajreshwari Mata Temple, Shri Chamunda Devi Mandir and Naina Devi Temple. The state also has many important Hindu pilgrimage sites with prominent temples like Baijnath Temple, Bhimakali Temple, Bijli Mahadev and Jakhoo Temple. Manimahesh Lake situated in the Bharmour region of Chamba district is the venue of an annual Hindu pilgrimage trek held in the month of August which attracts lakhs of devotees. The state is also referred to as "Dev Bhoomi" (literally meaning Abode of Gods) due to its mention as such in ancient Hindu texts and occurrence of a large number of historical temples in the state.

Himachal is also known for its adventure tourism activities like ice skating in Shimla, paragliding in Bir, Himachal Pradesh and Solang Valley, rafting in Kullu, skiing in Manali, boating in Bilaspur, fishing in Tirthan Valley, trekking and horse riding in different parts of the state. Shimla, the state's capital, is home to Asia's only natural ice-skating rink. The state has some of the highest mountain passes in the world - Rohtang Pass, Baralacha La, Kunzum La, Borasu Pass and Hampta Pass. Spiti Valley in Lahaul and Spiti District situated at an altitude of over 3000 metres with its picturesque landscapes is popular destination for adventure seekers. The region also has some of the oldest Buddhist monasteries in the world. Himachal hosted the first Paragliding World Cup in India from 24 to 31 October in 2015. Bir Billing, the venue for the paragliding world cup, is known as the launching site of paragliding. It is 70 km from the tourist town of Mcleod Ganj and is located in the heart of Himachal in Kangra district. Bir Billing is the centre for aero sports in Himachal and considered as best for paragliding. While Bir, the paragliding capital of India, is the landing site for paragliding. It is also known for its tourist attractions including Buddhist monasteries, trekking to tribal villages and mountain biking. The village also hosts prominent cultural musical events like Bir Music Festival, aiming to primarily promote the tourism of Bir.

There are a variety of festivals celebrated by the locals of Himachal Pradesh who worship gods and goddesses. There are over 2000 villages in Himachal Pradesh which celebrate festivals such as Kullu Dussehra, Chamba's Minjar, Renuka ji Fair, Lohri, Halda, Phagli, Losar and Mandi Shivratri. There approximately 6000 temples in Himachal Pradesh with a known one being Bijli Mahadev. The temple is seen as a 20-meter structure built in stone which, according to locals, is known to attract lightning. They say that this is a way the Gods show their blessings.

A UNESCO World Heritage Site named Great Himalayan National Park (GHNP) is located in the Banjar sub-division of Kullu district. It has an area of 700 km^{2} and ranging from an altitude of 1500 meters to 6000 meters and was created in 1984. There are various forest types found here such as Deodar, Himalayan Fir, Spruce, Oak and Alpine pastures. In the Great Himalayan National Park, there are a variety of animals found such as Snow leopard, Yak, Himalayan black bear, Western tragopan, Monal and Musk deer. This National Park is a trail to many hikers and trekkers too. Moreover, there are sanctuaries which are tourist spots such as Naina Devi and Gobind Sagar Sanctuary in the Una and Bilaspur districts with an area of 220 km^{2}. There are animals such as Indian porcupine and giant flying squirrel found here. The Gobind Sagar Lake has fish species such as Mrigal, Silver carp, Katla, Mahaseer and Rohu are found here. Narkanda located in at an altitude of around 8850 feet is known for its apple orchards. It is located between the river valleys of Giri and Sutlej.

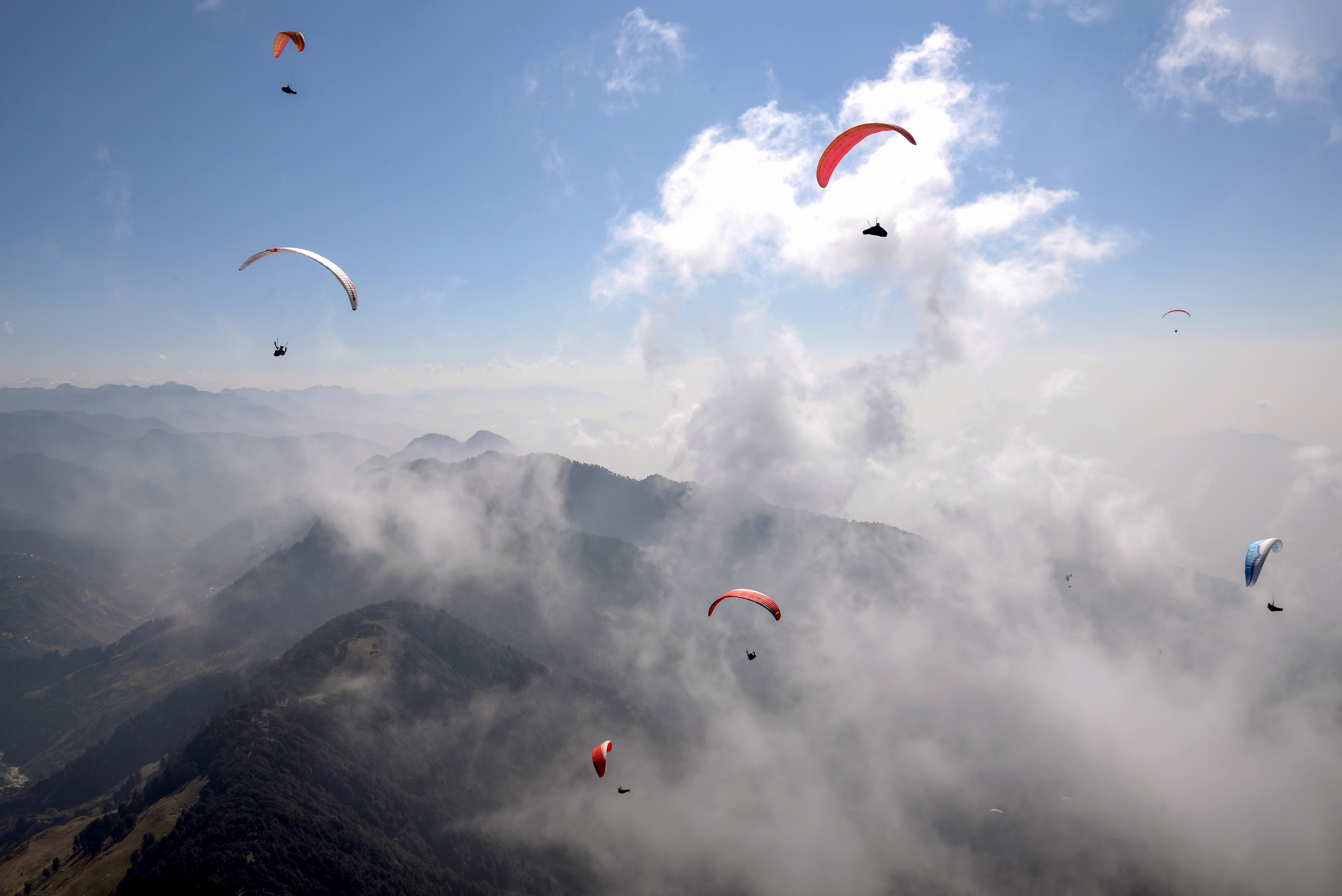
Paragliding in Bir

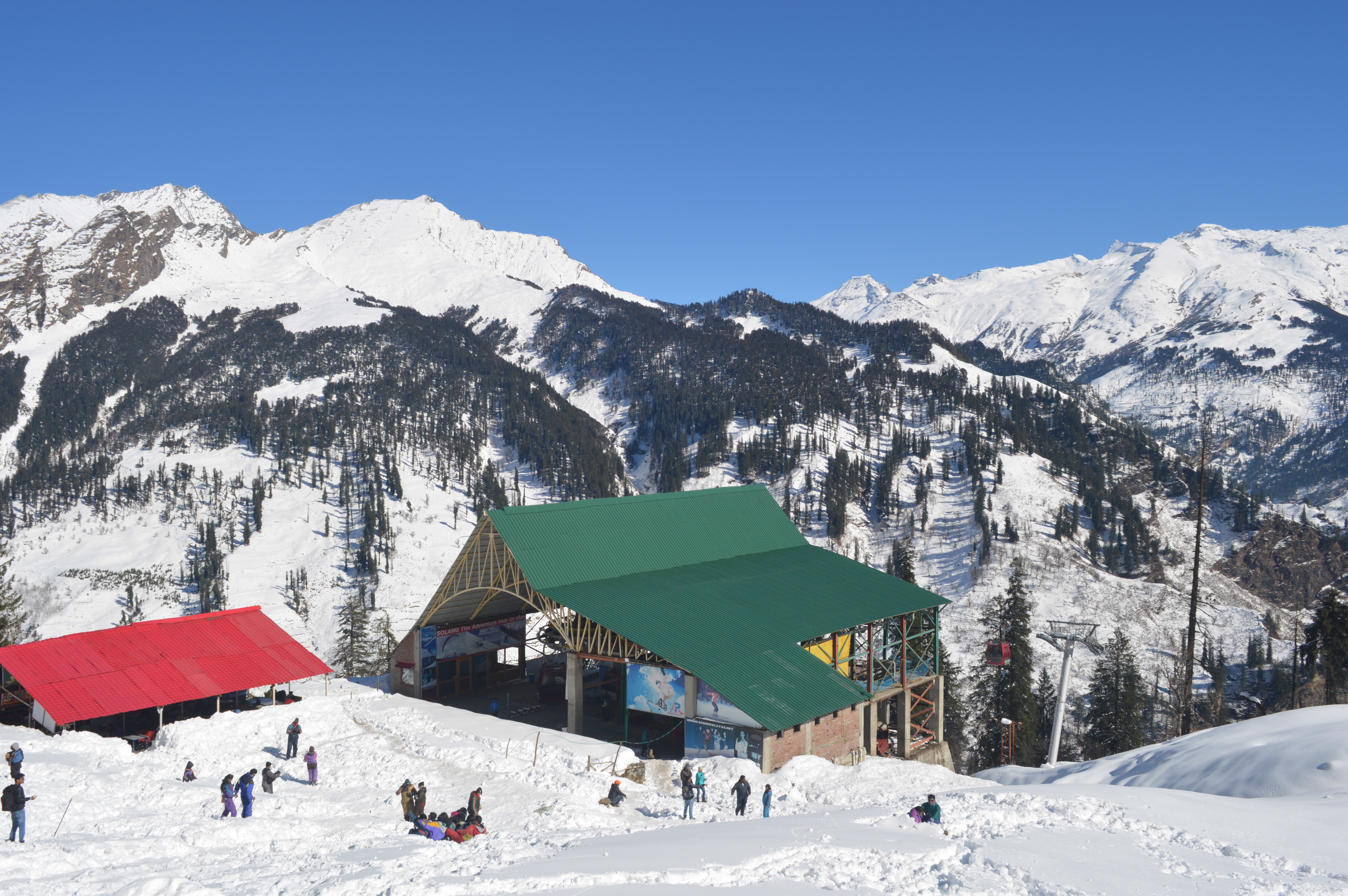
Solang, a popular ski resort near Manali

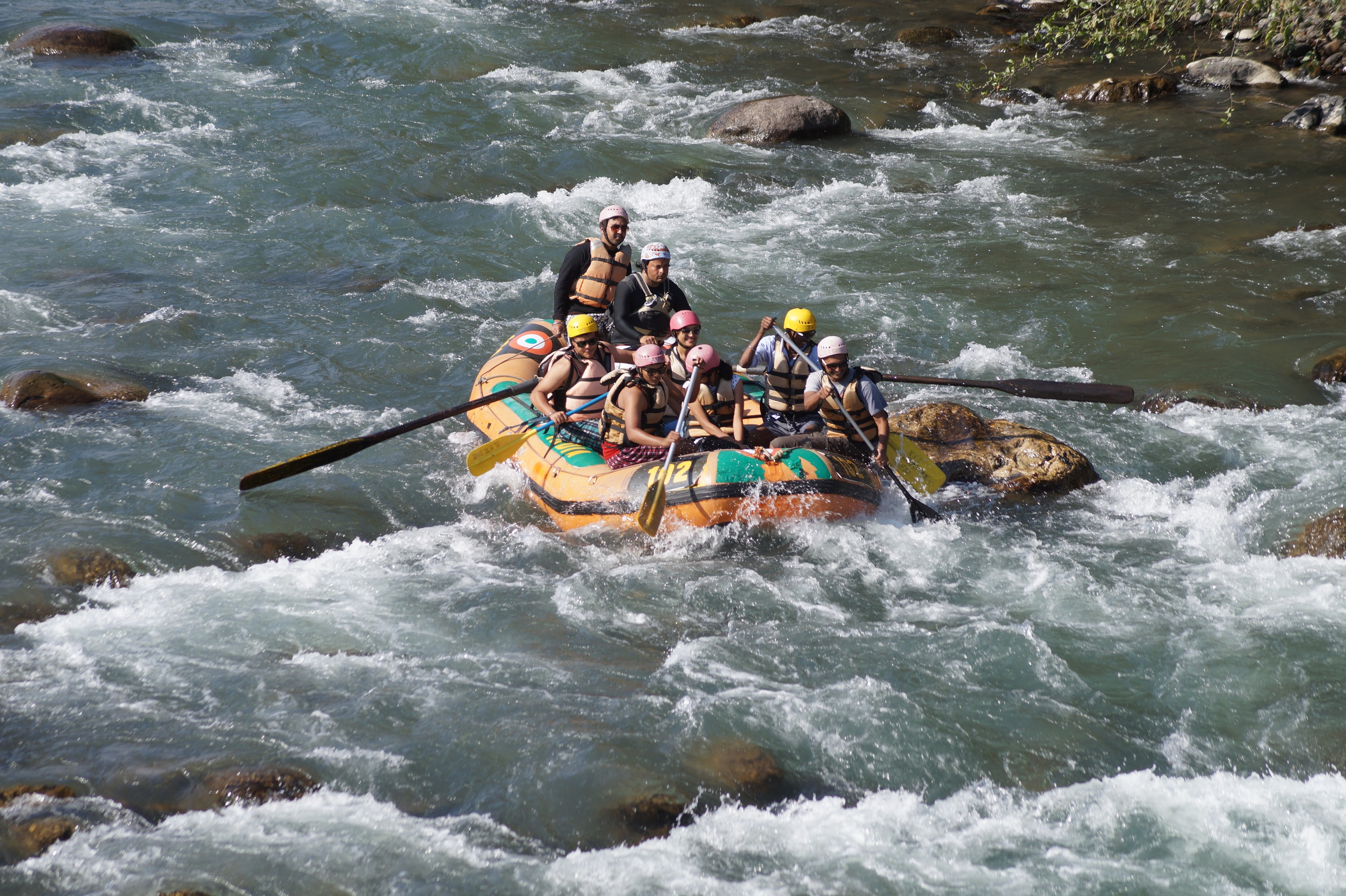
Rafting in the Parvati river near Kasol

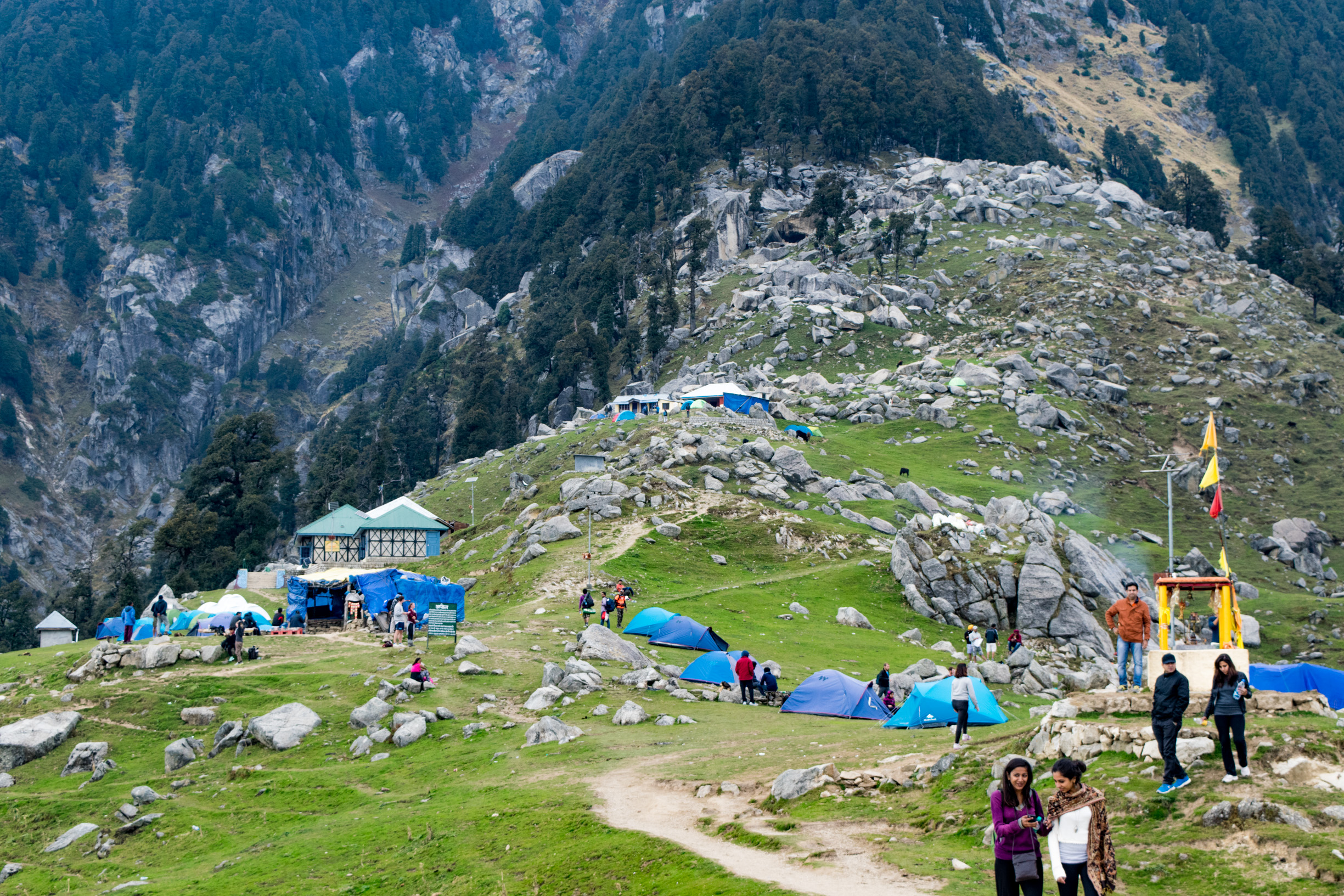
Campsite for trekkers at Triund

== Transport ==
=== Air ===
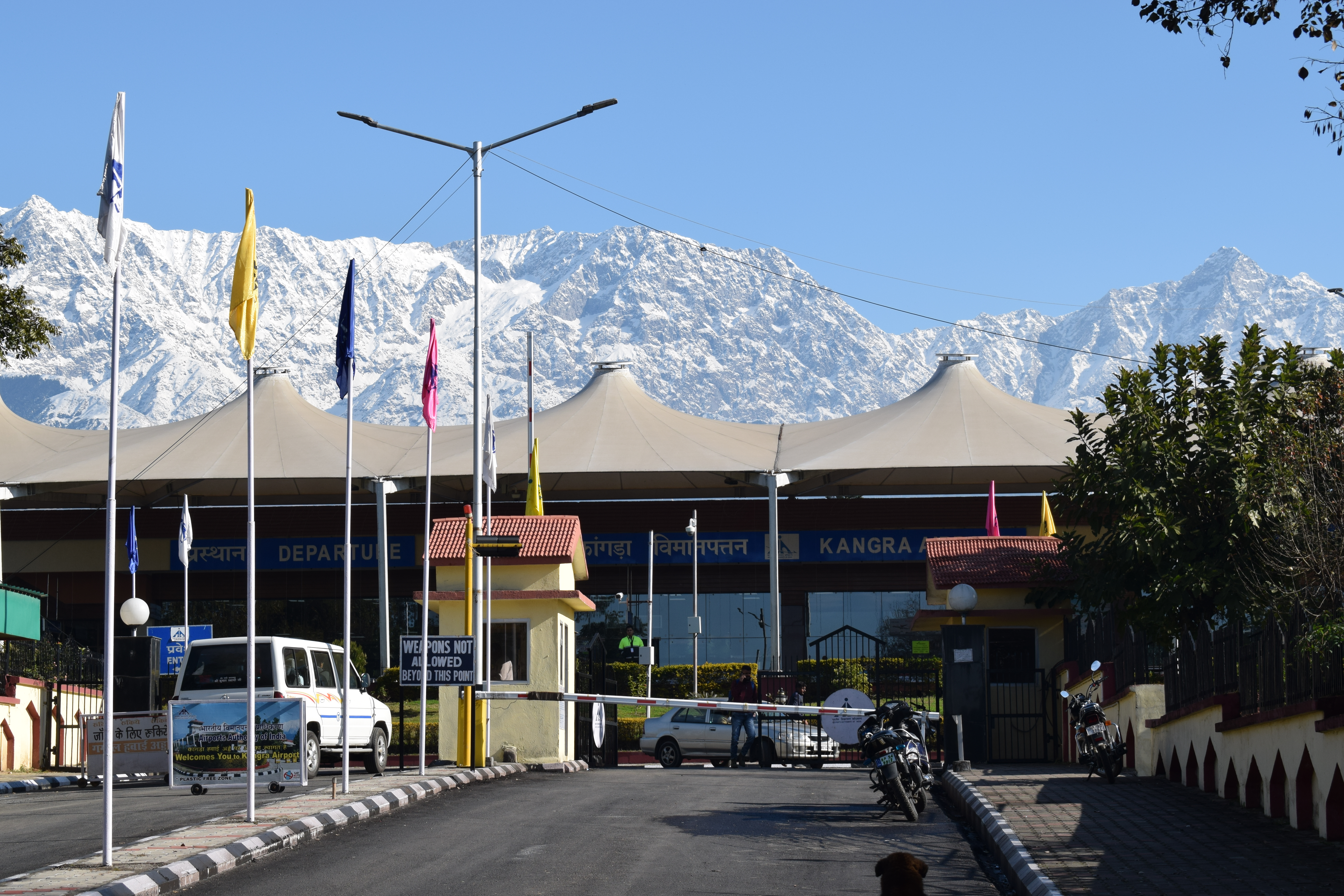
Gaggal Airport

Himachal has three domestic airports in Kangra, Kullu and Shimla districts, respectively. The air routes connect the state with New Delhi and Chandigarh.

- Kullu–Manali Airport is in Kullu district, around 10 kilometres (6 mi) from district headquarters Kullu.
- Kangra Airport is in Kangra district, around 15 kilometres (9 mi) from district headquarters at Dharamshala, which is around 10 kilometres (6 mi) from Kangra
- Shimla Airport is around 22 kilometres (14 mi) west of the Shimla city.

=== Railways ===
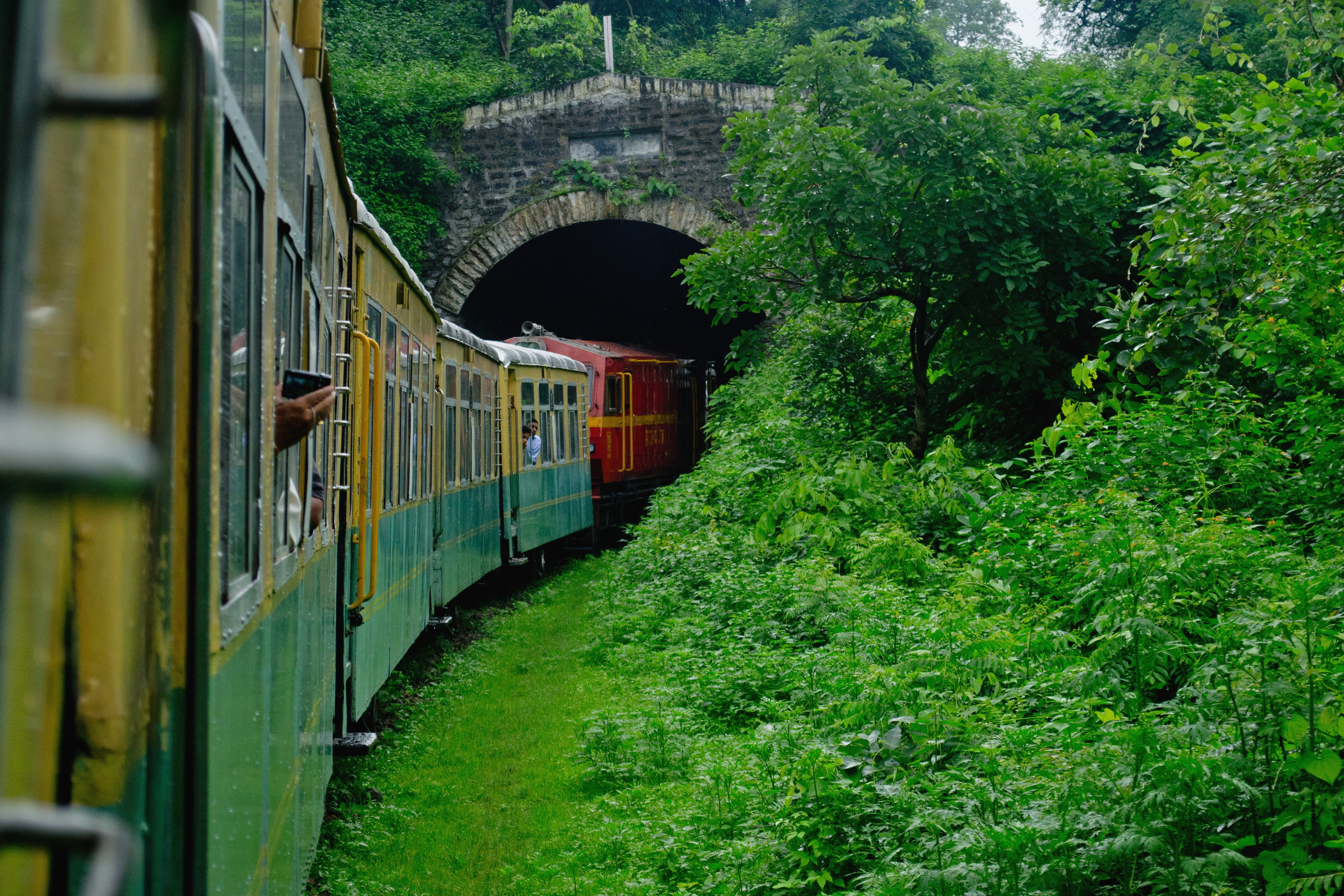
Kalka-Shimla Railway

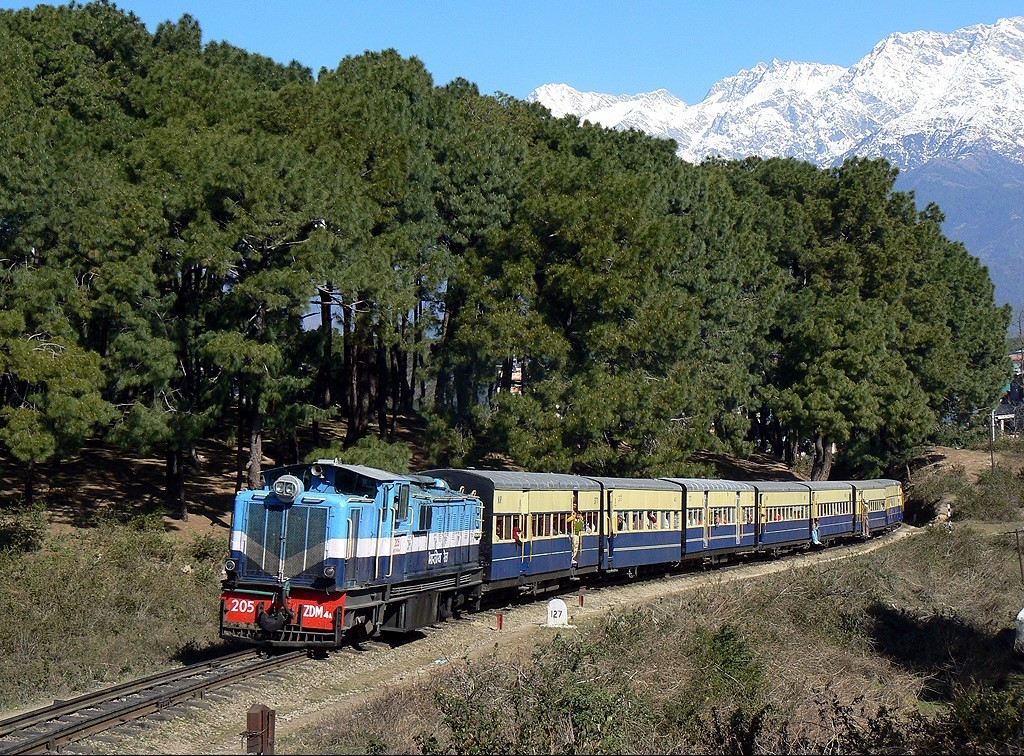
Kangra Valley Railway

==== Broad-gauge lines ====
The only broad-gauge railway line in the whole state connects Amb Andaura–Una Himachal railway station to Nangal Dam in Punjab and runs all the way to Daulatpur, Himachal Pradesh. It is an electrified track since 1999. While a tiny portion of line adjacent to Kandrori(KNDI) station on either side on Pathankot-Jalandhar Section, under Ferozepur Division of Northern Railway also crosses into Himachal Pradesh, before venturing out to Punjab again.

Future constructions:

- Una Himachal–Hamirpur rail project via Dhundla
- Bhanupali (Punjab)–Bilaspur, Himachal Pradesh
- Chandigarh–Baddi

==== Narrow-gauge lines ====
Himachal is known for its narrow-gauge railways. One is the Kalka-Shimla Railway, a UNESCO World Heritage Site, and another is the Kangra Valley Railway. The total length of these two tracks is 259 kilometres (161 mi). The Kalka-Shimla Railway passes through many tunnels and bridges, while the Pathankot–Jogindernagar one meanders through a maze of hills and valleys. The total route length of the operational railway network in the state is 296.26 kilometres (184.09 mi).

=== Roads ===
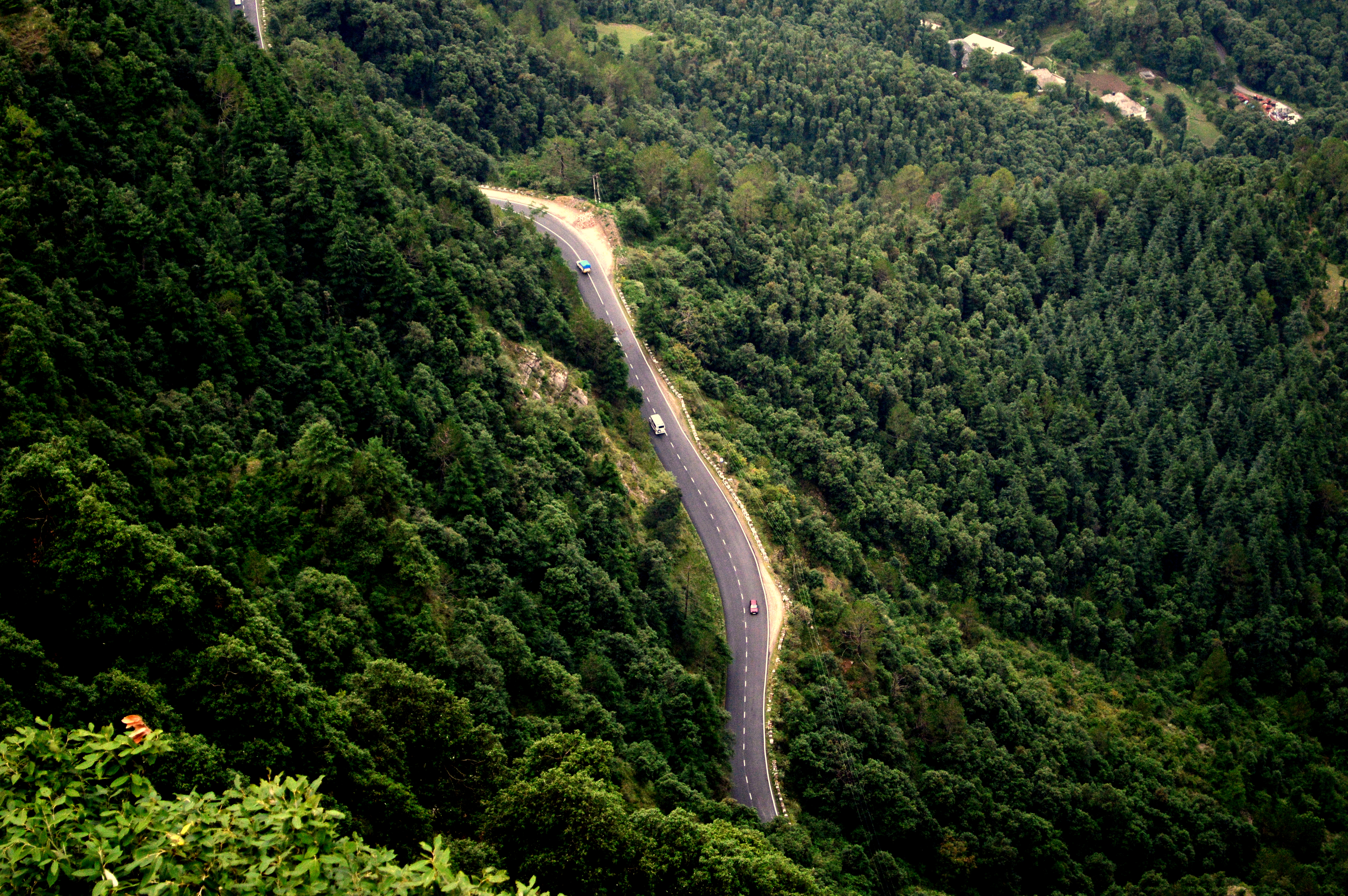
NH 5 in Himachal Pradesh

Roads are the major mode of transport in Himachal Pradesh due to its hilly terrain. The state has road network of 28,208 kilometres (17,528 mi), including eight National Highways (NH) that constitute 1,234 kilometres (767 mi) and 19 State Highways with a total length of 1,625 kilometres (1,010 mi). Hamirpur district has the highest road density in the country. Some roads are closed during winter and monsoon seasons due to snow and landslides. The state-owned Himachal Road Transport Corporation with a fleet of over 3,100, operates bus services connecting important cities and towns with villages within the state and also on various interstate routes. In addition, around 5,000 private buses ply in the state.

== Demographics ==
=== Population ===
Population Growth
| Year | Pop. | ±% |
|---|---|---|
| 1901 | 1,920,294 | — |
| 1911 | 1,896,944 | −1.2% |
| 1921 | 1,928,206 | +1.6% |
| 1931 | 2,029,113 | +5.2% |
| 1941 | 2,263,245 | +11.5% |
| 1951 | 2,385,981 | +5.4% |
| 1961 | 2,812,463 | +17.9% |
| 1971 | 3,460,434 | +23.0% |
| 1981 | 4,280,818 | +23.7% |
| 1991 | 5,170,877 | +20.8% |
| 2001 | 6,077,900 | +17.5% |
| 2011 | 6,864,602 | +12.9% |
Source: Census of India

Himachal Pradesh has a total population of 6,864,602 including 3,481,873 males and 3,382,729 females according to the Census of India 2011. It has only 0.57 per cent of India's total population, recording a growth of 12.81 per cent. The child sex ratio increased from 896 in 2001 to 909 in 2011. The total fertility rate (TFR) per woman in 2015 stood at 1.7, one of the lowest in India.

==== District wise ====
Source (2011 census)
| District | Population | % |
|---|---|---|
| Kangra | 1,507,223 | 21.98% |
| Mandi | 999,518 | 14.58% |
| Shimla | 813,384 | 11.86% |
| Solan | 576,670 | 8.41% |
| Sirmaur | 530,164 | 7.73% |
| Una | 521,057 | 7.60% |
| Chamba | 518,844 | 7.57% |
| Hamirpur | 454,293 | 6.63% |
| Kullu | 437,474 | 6.38% |
| Bilaspur | 382,056 | 5.57% |
| Kinnaur District | 84,298 | 1.23% |
| Lahaul Spiti | 31,528 | 0.46% |

In the census, the state is placed 21st on the population chart, followed by Tripura at 22nd place. Kangra District was top-ranked with a population strength of 1,507,223.

==== Life expectancy and literacy ====
Literacy rates
| Year | % |
|---|---|
| 1971 | 31.96 |
| 1981 | 42.48 |
| 1991 | 63.86 |
| 2001 | 76.48 |
| 2011 | 83.78 |

The life expectancy at birth in Himachal Pradesh increased significantly from 52.6 years in the period from 1970 to 1975 (above the national average of 49.7 years) to 72.0 years for the period 2011–15 (above the national average of 68.3 years). The infant mortality rate stood at 40 in 2010, and the crude birth rate has declined from 37.3 in 1971 to 16.9 in 2010, below the national average of 26.5 in 1998. The crude death rate was 6.9 in 2010. Himachal Pradesh's literacy rate has almost doubled between 1981 and 2011 (see table to right). The state is one of the most literate states of India with a literacy rate of 83.78% as of 2011.

=== Social groups ===
The scheduled castes and scheduled tribes account for 25.19 per cent and 5.71 per cent of the population, respectively. The sex ratio stood at 972 females per 1,000 males, recording a marginal increase from 968 in 2001. The main caste groups in Himachal Pradesh are Brahmins, Rajputs, Gurjars, Kanets, Kulindas, Ghirths, Kolis, Hollis, Chamars, Rehars, Lohars, Baris, Julahas, Turis, Batwals and Dalits.

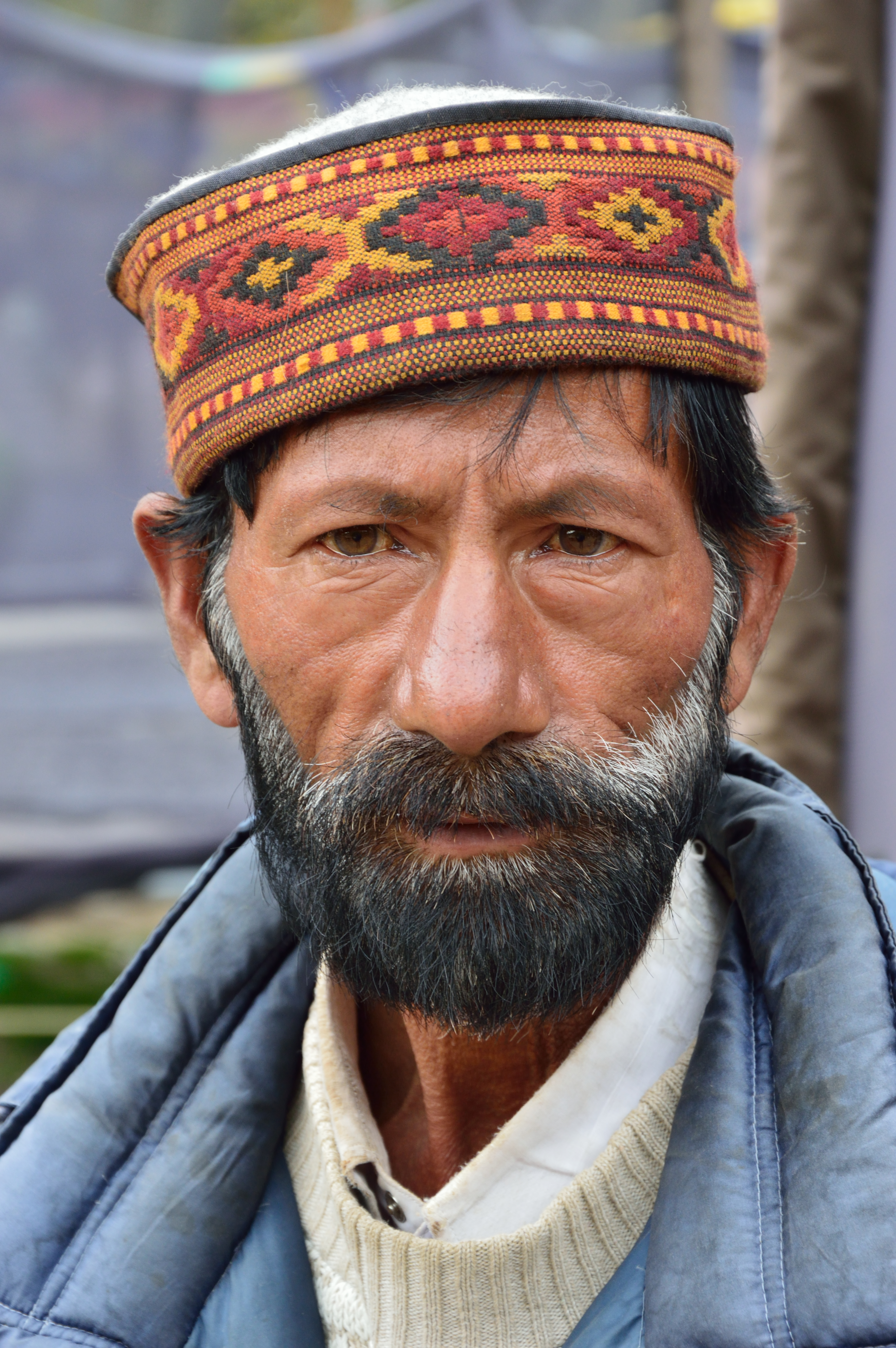
A man in Kullu, wearing a traditional Himachali cap.

=== Languages ===
Languages of Himachal Pradesh (2011)
1. Mahasu Pahari (31.9%)
2. Kangri (16.2%)
3. Hindi (15.7%)
4. Mandeali (9.05%)
5. Punjabi (4.42%)
6. Bilaspuri (4.31%)
7. Kullui (2.86%)
8. Gaddi (2.23%)
9. Chambeali (1.81%)
10. Sirmauri (1.56%)
11. Nepali (1.30%)
12. Kinnauri (1.20%)
13. "Other" Hindi (1.18%)
14. Churahi (1.10%)
15. Others (5.15%)

==== Main languages ====
Hindi is the de jure official language of Himachal Pradesh and is spoken by the majority of the population as a lingua franca. Sanskrit is the additional official language of the state. Although mostly encountered in academic and symbolic contexts, the government of Himachal Pradesh is encouraging its wider study and use.

Most of the population, however, natively speaks one or another of the Western Pahari languages (locally also known as Himachali or Pahari), a subgroup of the Indo-Aryan languages that includes Mahasu Pahari, Pahari Kinnauri, Kangri, Mandeali, Bilaspuri, Chambeali, Kullui, Gaddi, Sirmauri, Churahi, Hinduri, Pangwali and Bhattiyali. Additional spoken languages include Hindi (15.68%), Punjabi (4.42%), Nepali (1.30%) and Kinnauri (1.20%).

==== Other languages ====
In parts of the state there are speakers of Haryanavi (0.32%) and Gujari (0.21%) and Lahuli–Spiti languages (0.16%), Pattani (0.12%), Tibetan (0.3%), Bhoti Kinnauri, Chitkuli Kinnauri, Bunan (or Gahri), Jangshung, Kanashi, Shumcho, Spiti Bhoti, Sunam, Tinani, Tukpa, Chinali, and Lahul Lohar.

=== Religion ===
Religion in Himachal Pradesh (2011)
1. Hinduism (95.2%)
2. Islam (2.18%)
3. Sikhism (1.16%)
4. Buddhism (1.15%)
5. Christianity (0.18%)
6. Jainism (0.03%)
7. Others or not stated (0.13%)

Hinduism is the major religion in Himachal Pradesh. More than 95% of the total population adheres to the Hindu faith and majorly follows Shaivism and Shaktism traditions, the distribution of which is evenly spread throughout the state. Himachal Pradesh has the highest proportion of Hindu population among all the states and union territories in India.

Other religions that form a smaller percentage are Islam, Sikhism and Buddhism. Muslims are mainly concentrated in Sirmaur, Chamba, Una and Solan districts where they form 2.5-6.3% of the population. Sikhs mostly live in towns and cities and constitute 1.16% of the state population. The Buddhists, who constitute 1.15%, are mainly natives and tribals from Lahaul and Spiti, where they form a majority of 62%, and Kinnaur, where they form 21.5%.

Religion in Himachal Pradesh (1881–2011)
| Religious group | 1881 (Note: British Punjab province era figures taken from census data by combining the total population of all districts (Simla and Kangra) and princely states (Mandi, Chamba, Sirmoor, Bilaspur, Suket, and other small/minor Simla Hill states) which are in the region that comprises the contemporary state of Himachal Pradesh, India.) | | 1891 | | 1901 | | 1911 | | 1921 | | 1931 | | 1941 | | 1951 (Note: Total population of all East Punjab subdivisions that form part of contemporary Himachal Pradesh including Simla district, Kangra district, Mahasu district, Mandi district, Chamba district, Sirmoor district, and Bilaspur state.) | | 1961 (Note: Total population of all East Punjab subdivisions that form part of contemporary Himachal Pradesh including Simla district, Kangra district, Lahaul & Spiti district, Chamba district, Mandi district, Bilaspur district, Mahasu district, Sirmur district, and Kinnaur district.) | | 1971 | | 2011 | |
| Religious group | Pop. | % | Pop. | % | Pop. | % | Pop. | % | Pop. | % | Pop. | % | Pop. | % | Pop. | % | Pop. | % | Pop. | % | Pop. | % |
|---|---|---|---|---|---|---|---|---|---|---|---|---|---|---|---|---|---|---|---|---|---|---|
| Hinduism (Note: 1931-1941: Including Ad-Dharmis) | 1,458,481 | 94.74% | 1,558,111 | 94.7% | 1,598,853 | 94.6% | 1,630,084 | 94.53% | 1,642,176 | 94.5% | 1,729,008 | 94.42% | 1,929,634 | 94.76% | 2,024,692 | 97.24% | 2,467,765 | 96.9% | 3,324,627 | 96.08% | 6,532,765 | 95.17% |
| Islam | 70,642 | 4.59% | 72,873 | 4.43% | 76,480 | 4.53% | 74,205 | 4.3% | 77,425 | 4.46% | 82,711 | 4.52% | 87,485 | 4.3% | 22,338 | 1.07% | 34,744 | 1.36% | 50,327 | 1.45% | 149,881 | 2.18% |
| Christianity | 3,840 | 0.25% | 3,571 | 0.22% | 3,415 | 0.2% | 4,400 | 0.26% | 4,471 | 0.26% | 2,586 | 0.14% | 2,129 | 0.1% | 1,517 | 0.07% | 2,904 | 0.11% | 3,556 | 0.1% | 12,646 | 0.18% |
| Buddhism | 3,250 | 0.21% | 6,236 | 0.38% | 6,931 | 0.41% | 7,518 | 0.44% | 5,718 | 0.33% | 7,705 | 0.42% | 614 (Note: Enumeration error for adherents of Buddhism and Zoroastrianism likely occurred in Kangra district.) | 0.03% | 1,320 | 0.06% | 18,020 | 0.71% | 35,937 | 1.04% | 78,659 | 1.15% |
| Sikhism | 2,680 | 0.17% | 4,167 | 0.25% | 3,897 | 0.23% | 7,894 | 0.46% | 7,610 | 0.44% | 8,948 | 0.49% | 12,245 | 0.6% | 30,837 | 1.48% | 22,845 | 0.9% | 44,914 | 1.3% | 79,896 | 1.16% |
| Jainism | 536 | 0.03% | 388 | 0.02% | 483 | 0.03% | 358 | 0.02% | 356 | 0.02% | 291 | 0.02% | 425 | 0.02% | 1,364 | 0.07% | 358 | 0.01% | 626 | 0.02% | 1,805 | 0.03% |
| Zoroastrianism | 4 | 0% | 13 | 0% | 7 | 0% | 18 | 0% | 40 | 0% | 3 | 0% | 3,895 | 0.19% | 13 | 0% | 7 | 0% | 51 | 0% | —N/a | —N/a |
| Judaism | —N/a | —N/a | 0 | 0% | 0 | 0% | 3 | 0% | 1 | 0% | 1 | 0% | 0 | 0% | 12 | 0% | 0 | 0% | 0 | 0% | —N/a | —N/a |
| Others | 0 | 0% | 5 | 0% | 0 | 0% | 0 | 0% | 4 | 0% | 0 | 0% | 1 | 0% | 0 | 0% | 125 | 0% | 396 | 0.01% | 8,950 | 0.13% |
| Total population | 1,539,433 | 100% | 1,645,364 | 100% | 1,690,066 | 100% | 1,724,480 | 100% | 1,737,801 | 100% | 1,831,253 | 100% | 2,036,428 | 100% | 2,082,093 | 100% | 2,546,768 | 100% | 3,460,434 | 100% | 6,864,602 | 100% |

== Culture ==
Himachal Pradesh was one of the few states that had remained largely untouched by external customs, largely due to its difficult terrain. With remarkable economic and social advancements, the state has changed rapidly. Culturally Himachal Pradesh is divided in three parts, Upper Himachal, known as Mahasu region, Lower Himachal which includes the districts of Kangra, Hamirpur, Bilaspur, Una and parts of Chamba and third part includes two districts of Lahaul and Spiti and upper parts of Kinnaur. Himachal Pradesh is a multilingual state unlike other Indian states. Western Pahari languages also known as Himachali languages are widely spoken in the state. Some of the most commonly spoken Pahari dialects are Mahasu Pahari, Kangri, Sirmauri, Mandeali, Bilaspuri, Kullui, Chambeali, Bharmauri and Kinnauri.

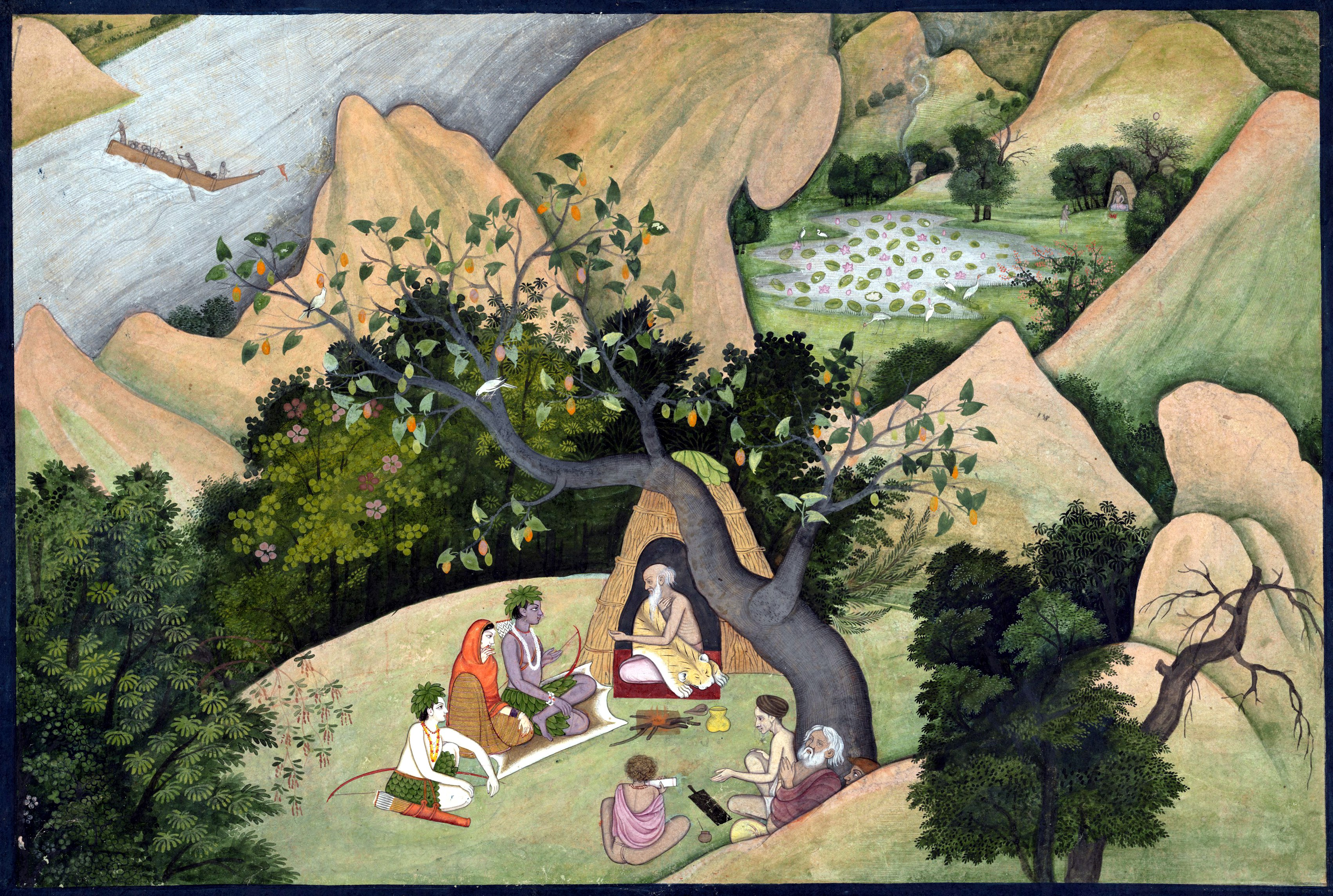
Kangra painting depicting a scene from the Ramayana, ca. 1780

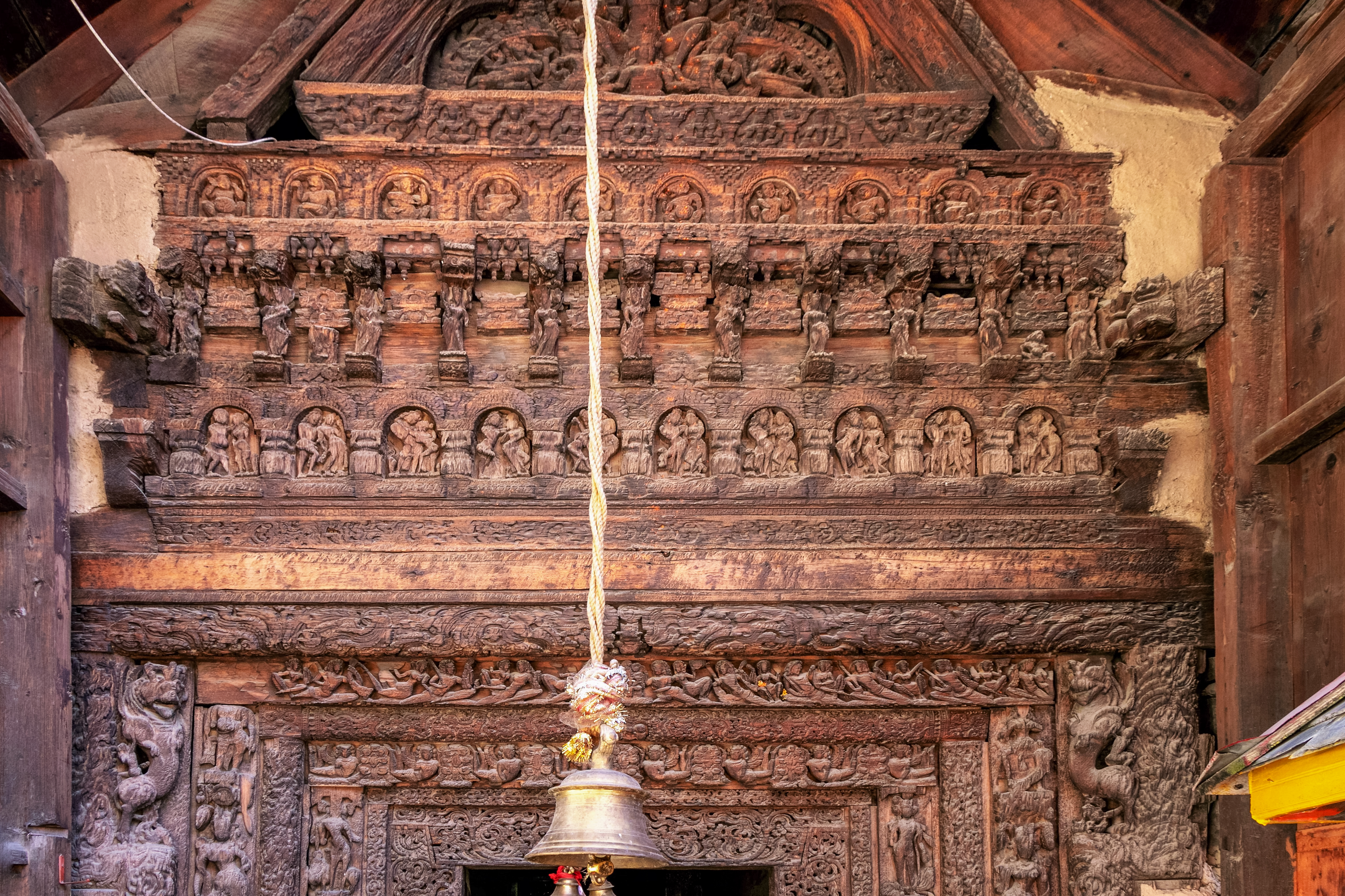
Intricate wood carvings of 7-century Lakshana Devi Temple in Bharmour

Himachal is well known for its handicrafts. The carpets, leather works, Kullu shawls, Kangra paintings, Chamba Rumals, stoles, embroidered grass footwear (Pullan chappal), silver jewellery, metal ware, knitted woolen socks, Pattoo, basketry of cane and bamboo (Wicker and Rattan) and woodwork are among the notable ones. Of late, the demand for these handicrafts has increased within and outside the country.

Himachali caps of various colour bands are also well-known local art work, and are often treated as a symbol of the Himachali identity. The colour of the Himachali caps has been an indicator of political loyalties in the hill state for a long period of time with Congress party leaders like Virbhadra Singh donning caps with green band and the rival BJP leader Prem Kumar Dhumal wearing a cap with maroon band. The former has served six terms as the Chief Minister of the state while the latter is a two-time Chief Minister. Local music and dance also reflect the cultural identity of the state. Through their dance and music, the Himachali people entreat their gods during local festivals and other special occasions.

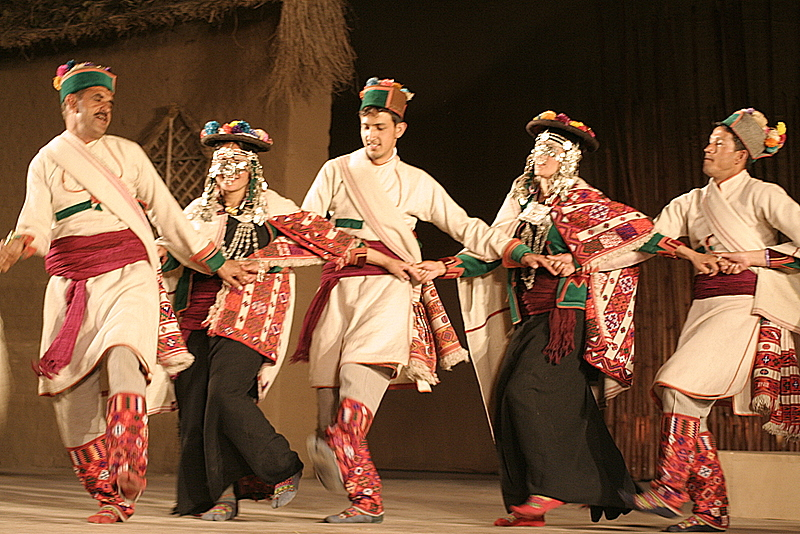
Kinnauri Nati performance

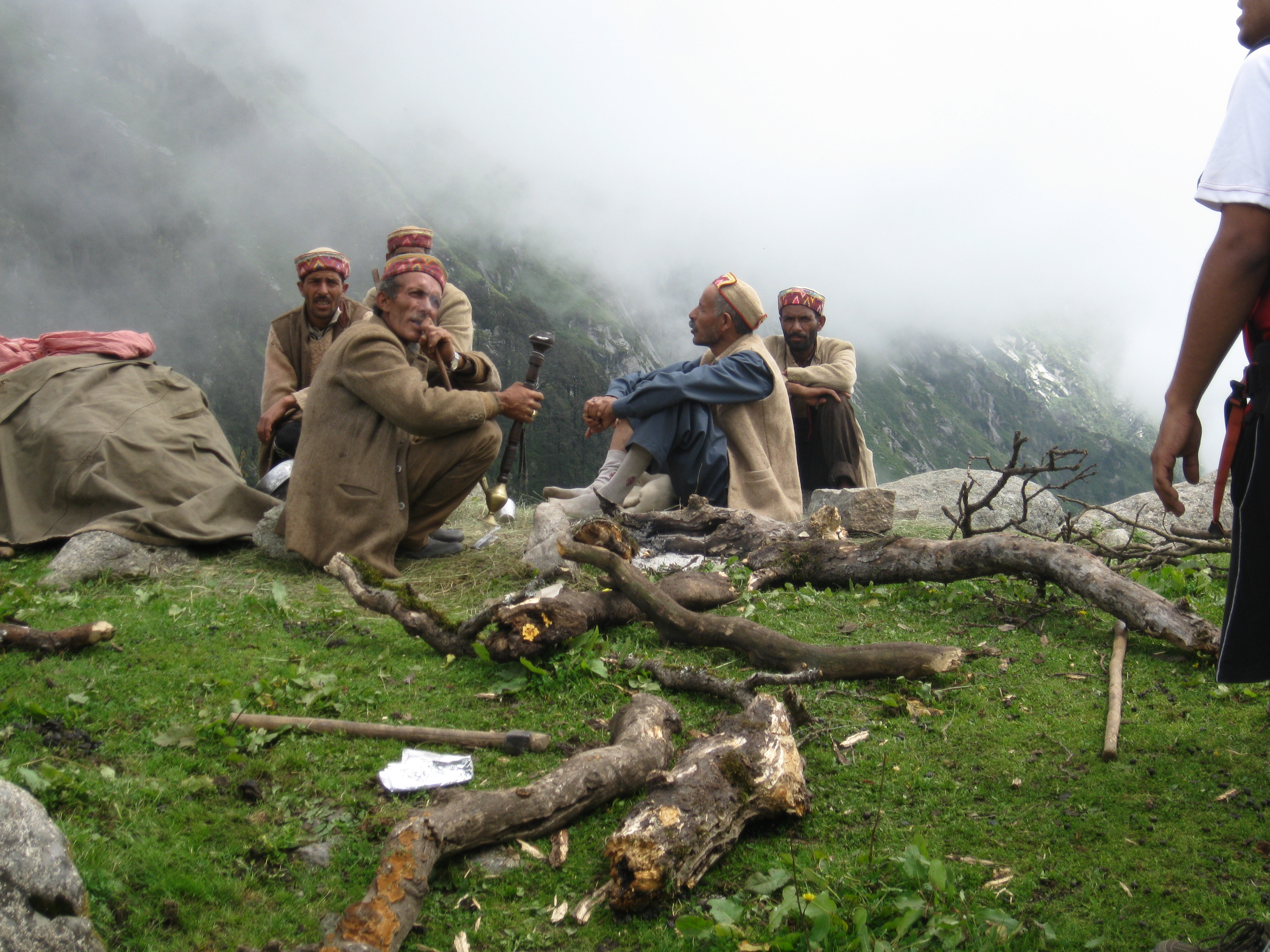
Gaddi nomads smoking hookah

There are national and regional fairs and festivals, including temple fairs in nearly every region. The Kullu Dussehra, Minjar mela and Mahashivratri Mandi festival is nationally known. The day-to-day cuisine of Himachalis is similar to the rest of northern India with Punjabi and Tibetan influences. Lentils (Dāl), rice (chāwal or bhāț), vegetables (sabzī) and chapati (wheat flatbread) form the staple food of the local population. Non-vegetarian food is more widely accepted in Himachal Pradesh than elsewhere in India, partly due to the scarcity of fresh vegetables on the hilly terrain of the state.

Himachali specialities include Siddu, Babru, Khatta, Mhanee, Channa Madra, Patrode, Mah ki dal, Chamba-style fried fish, Kullu trout, Chha Gosht, Pahadi Chicken, Sepu Badi, Auriya Kaddu, Aloo palda, Pateer, Makki di roti, Sarson ka saag, Chamba Chukh (Chouck), Bhagjery, Chutney of Til, etc.

== Education ==
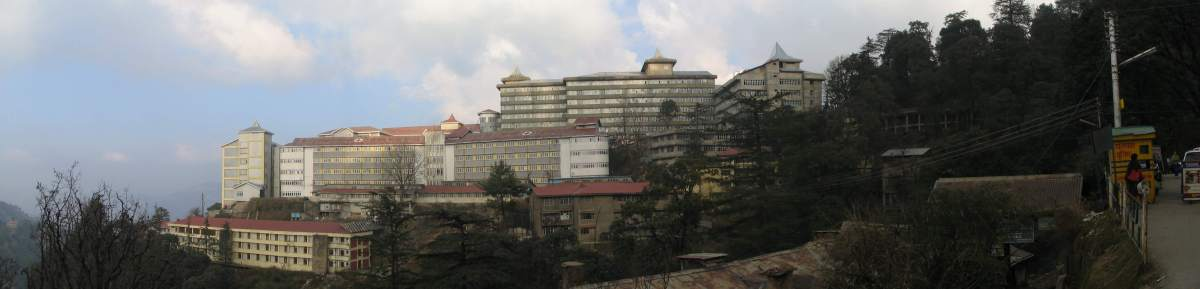
Indira Gandhi Medical College and Hospital at Shimla

At the time of Independence, Himachal Pradesh had a literacy rate of 8% – one of the lowest in the country. By 2011, the literacy rate surged to 82.8%, making Himachal one of the most-literate states in the country. There are over 10,000 primary schools, 1,000 secondary schools and more than 1,300 high schools in the state. In meeting the constitutional obligation to make primary education compulsory, Himachal became the first state in India to make elementary education accessible to every child. Himachal Pradesh is an exception to the nationwide gender bias in education levels. The state has a female literacy rate of around 76%. In addition, school enrolment and participation rates for girls are almost universal at the primary level. While higher levels of education do reflect a gender-based disparity, Himachal is still significantly ahead of other states at bridging the gap. The Hamirpur District in particular stands out for high literacy rates across all metrics of measurement.

The state government has played an instrumental role in the rise of literacy in the state by spending a significant proportion of the state's GDP on education. During the first six five-year plans, most of the development expenditure in the education sector was utilised in quantitative expansion, but after the seventh five-year-plan the state government switched emphasis on qualitative improvement and modernisation of education. To raise the number of the teaching staff at primary schools they appointed over 1000 teacher aids through the Vidya Upasak Yojna in 2001. The Sarva Shiksha Abhiyan is another HP government initiative that not only aims for universal elementary education but also encourages communities to engage in the management of schools. The Rashtriya Madhayamic Shiksha Abhiyan launched in 2009, is a similar scheme but focuses on improving access to quality secondary education.

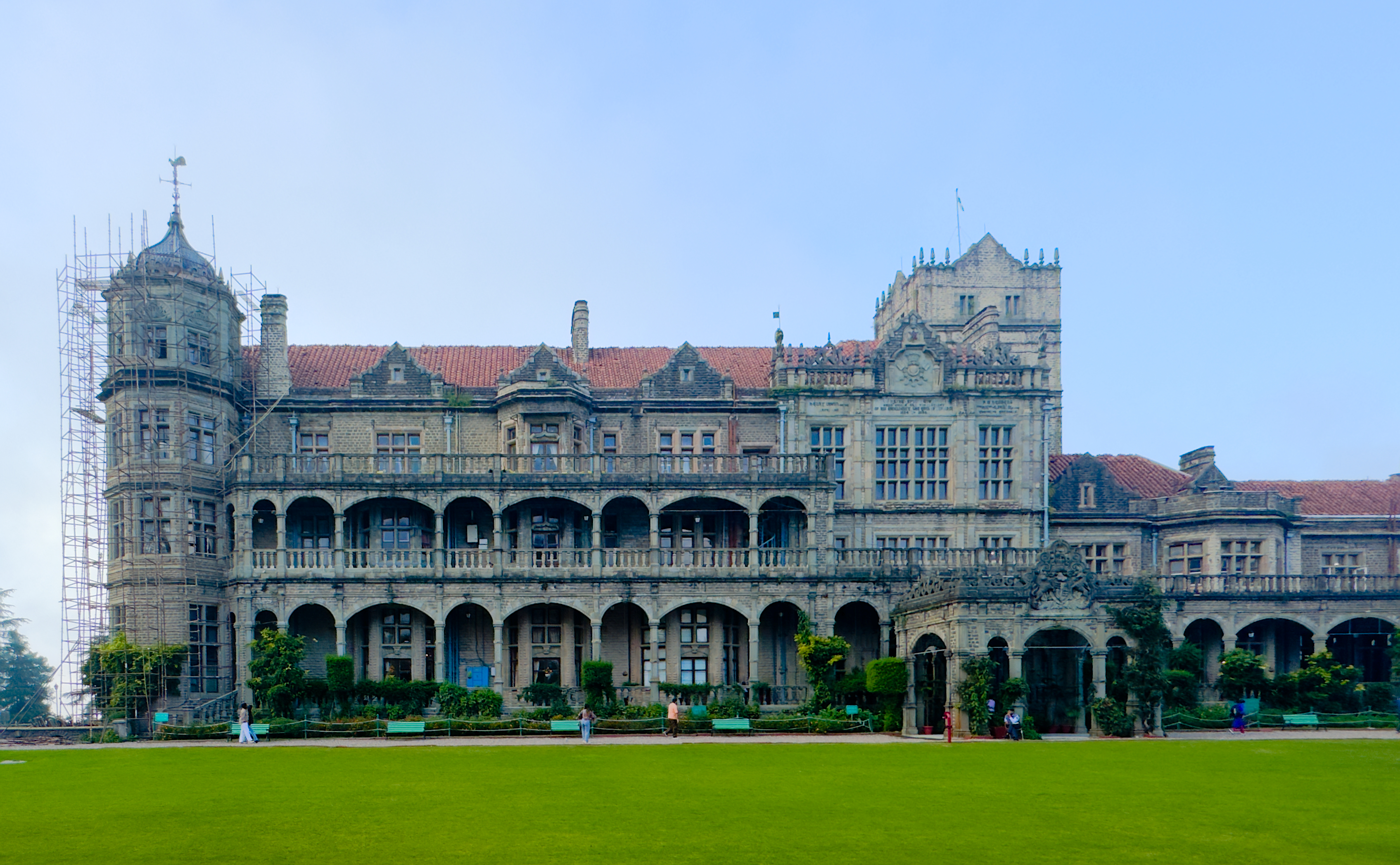
Indian Institute of Advanced Study at Shimla

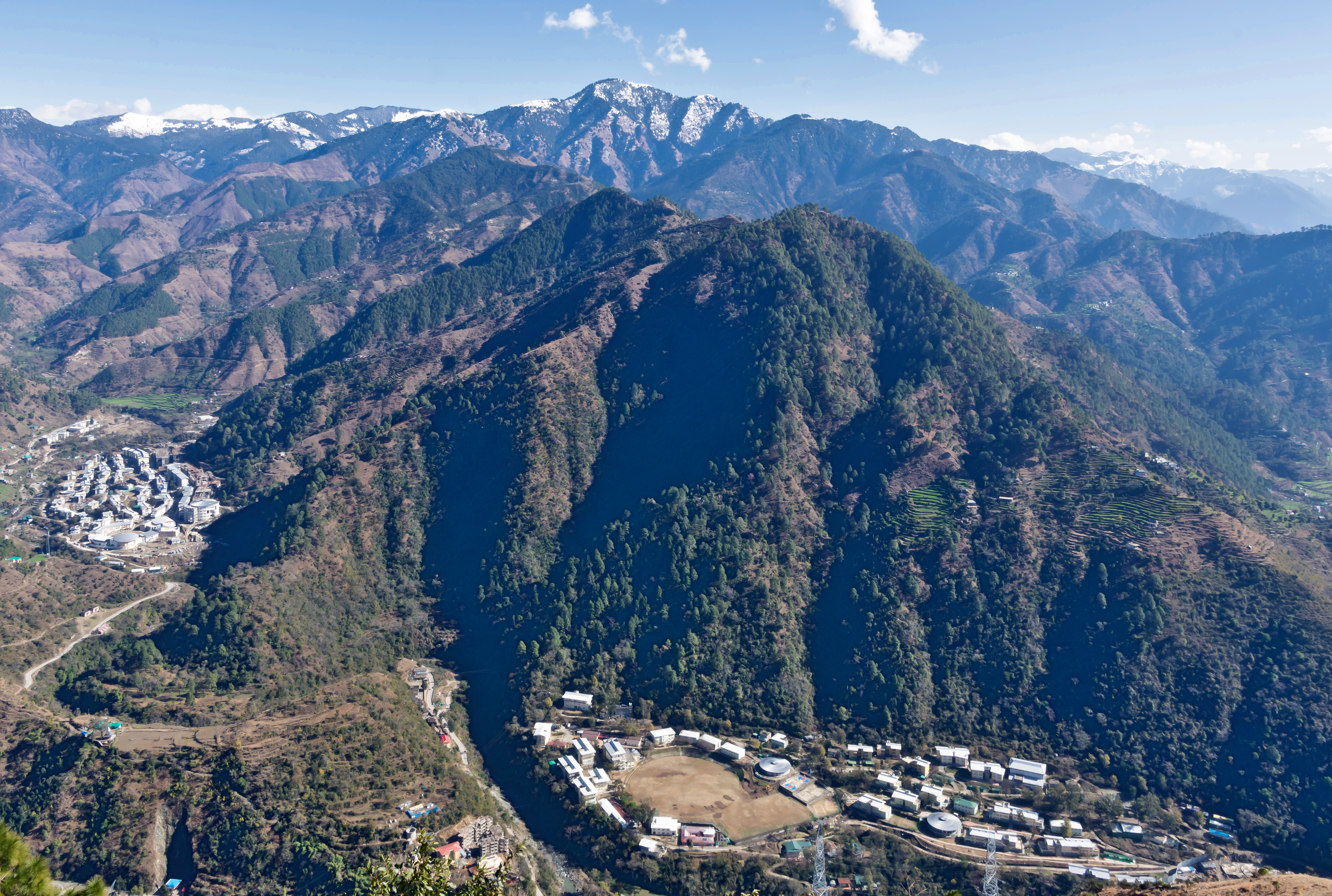
Indian Institute of Technology, Mandi near Kamand

The standard of education in the state has reached a considerably high level as compared to other states in India with several reputed educational institutes for higher studies. The Baddi University of Emerging Sciences and Technologies, Indian Institute of Technology Mandi, Indian Institute of Management Sirmaur, Himachal Pradesh University in Shimla, Central University of Himachal Pradesh, Dharamsala, National Institute of Technology, Hamirpur, Indian Institute of Information Technology Una, Alakh Prakash Goyal University, Maharaja Agrasen University, Himachal Pradesh National Law University are some of the notable universities in the state. Indira Gandhi Medical College and Hospital in Shimla, Dr. Rajendra Prasad Government Medical College in Kangra, Rajiv Gandhi Government Post Graduate Ayurvedic College in Paprola and Homoeopathic Medical College & Hospital in Kumarhatti are the prominent medical institutes in the state. Besides these, there is a Government Dental College in Shimla which is the state's first recognised dental institute.

The state government has also decided to start three major nursing colleges to develop the healthcare system of the state. CSK Himachal Pradesh Krishi Vishwavidyalya Palampur is one of the most renowned hill agriculture institutes in the world. Dr. Yashwant Singh Parmar University of Horticulture and Forestry has earned a unique distinction in India for imparting teaching, research and extension education in horticulture, forestry and allied disciplines. Further, state-run Jawaharlal Nehru Government Engineering College was inaugurated in 2006 at Sundernagar. Himachal Pradesh also hosts a campus of the fashion college, National Institute of Fashion Technology (NIFT) in Kangra.

== State profile ==
Source: Department of Information and Public Relations.

| Area | 55,673 km^{2} |
| Total population | 7,781,244 |
| Males | 3,946,646 |
| Females | 3,834,598 |
| Population density | 123 |
| Sex ratio | 972 |
| Rural population | 6,176,050 |
| Urban population | 688,552 |
| Scheduled Caste population | 1,729,252 |
| Scheduled Tribe population | 392,126 |
| Literacy rate | 83.78% |
| Male literacy | 90.83% |
| Female literacy | 76.60% |
| Capitals | 2 |
| Districts | 12 |
| Sub-divisions | 71 |
| Tehsils | 169 |
| Sub-tehsils | 38 |
| Developmental blocks | 78 |
| Towns | 59 |
| Panchayats | 3,243 |
| Panchayat smities | 77 |
| Zila parishad | 12 |
| Urban local bodies | 59 |
| Nagar nigams | 8 |
| Nagar parishads | 25 |
| Nagar panchayats | 23 |
| Census villages | 20,690 |
| Inhabited villages | 17,882 |
| Health institutions | 3,866 |
| Educational institutions | 17,000 |
| Motorable roads | 33,722 km |
| National highways | 8 |
| Identified hydroelectric potential | 23,000.43 MW in five rivers basins, i.e., Yamuna, Satluj, Beas, Ravi, Chenab and Himurja |
| Potential harnessed | 10,264 MW |
| Food grain production | 15.28lakh MT |
| Vegetable production | 18.67 lakh MT |
| Fruit production | 1,027,000 tonnes |
| Per capita income | ₹2,01,854 (2021–22) |
| Social Security pensions | 237,250 persons, annual expenditure: over ₹ 600 million |
| Investment in industrial areas | ₹ 273.80 billion, employment opportunities: Over 337,391 |
| Employment generated in government sector | 2,17,142 |

== See also ==
- Outline of Himachal Pradesh
