= Pahari people (Kashmir) =

Collection of ethnolinguistic groups in Jammu & Kashmir

Pahari Ethnic Group
پہاڑی
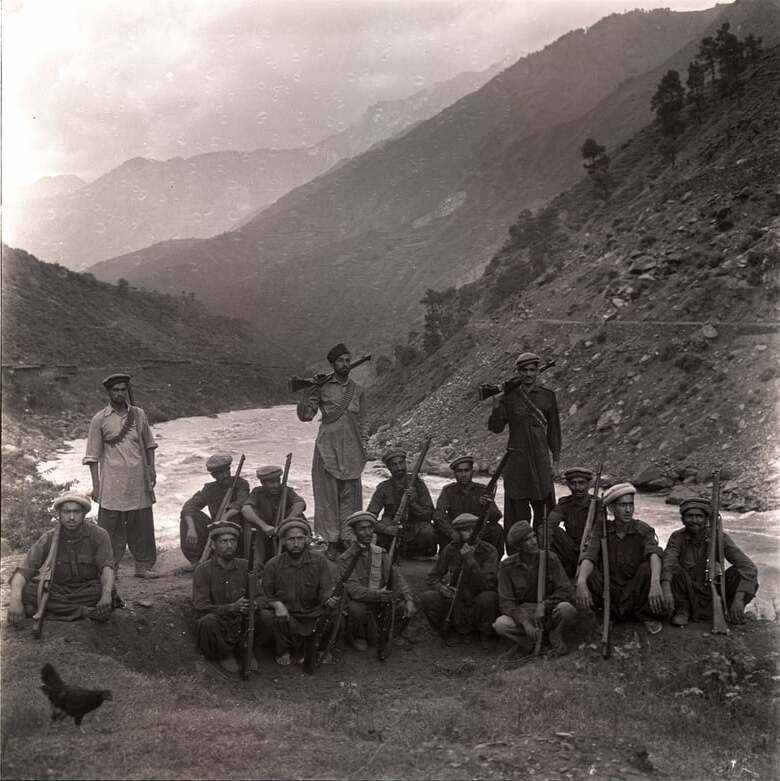
- A group of Pahari irregular militiamen from Pakistan-administered Kashmir.

Languages
- Pahari

Religion
- Hinduism; Islam; Sikhism

Related ethnic groups
- Kashmiri Gujjars, Bakarwal

Pahari people or Pahari-speaking people is a term used to refer to a number of heterogeneous communities inhabiting in the Indian-administered Jammu and Kashmir, and Pakistan-administered Azad Kashmir who speak the Pahari languages.

== Etymology ==
The Jammu and Kashmir Socially Economically Backward Classes Commission constituted by the Government of Jammu and Kashmir headed by Justice GD Sharma in 2020 in its report has recommended renaming the group Pahari Speaking People (PSP) as one who speak Pothowari dialects, which falls under Lahnda Western Punjabi with the substitute nomenclature Pahari Ethnic Group (PEG) in terms of provisions to grant reservation to them as "PSP" under Jammu and Kashmir Reservation Rules 2004 and accordingly, the Jammu and Kashmir government issued instructions on October 19, 2022, and replaced Pahari Speaking People with Pahari Ethnic Group, which tends to identify them as an ethnic group to be brought under the purview of the Scheduled Tribes under the Constitution of India.

== People and Languages ==
According to the UNESCO, all of Western Pahari languages, except for Dogri, are under either definitely endangered or critically endangered category,with only Dogri having an official status.The Pahari people are mainly referred to two groups:

- Speakers of several languages/dialects which are classified as Western Pahari by G.A. Grierson in the first Linguistic Survey of India. Some of these include Chambeali, Kangri, Bhadarwahi (including Bhalesi), Padderi, Sarazi, Gaddi and Dogri. They are predominantly spoken in the Indian province of Himachal Pradesh and the Jammu region in the Indian union territory of Jammu and Kashmir.
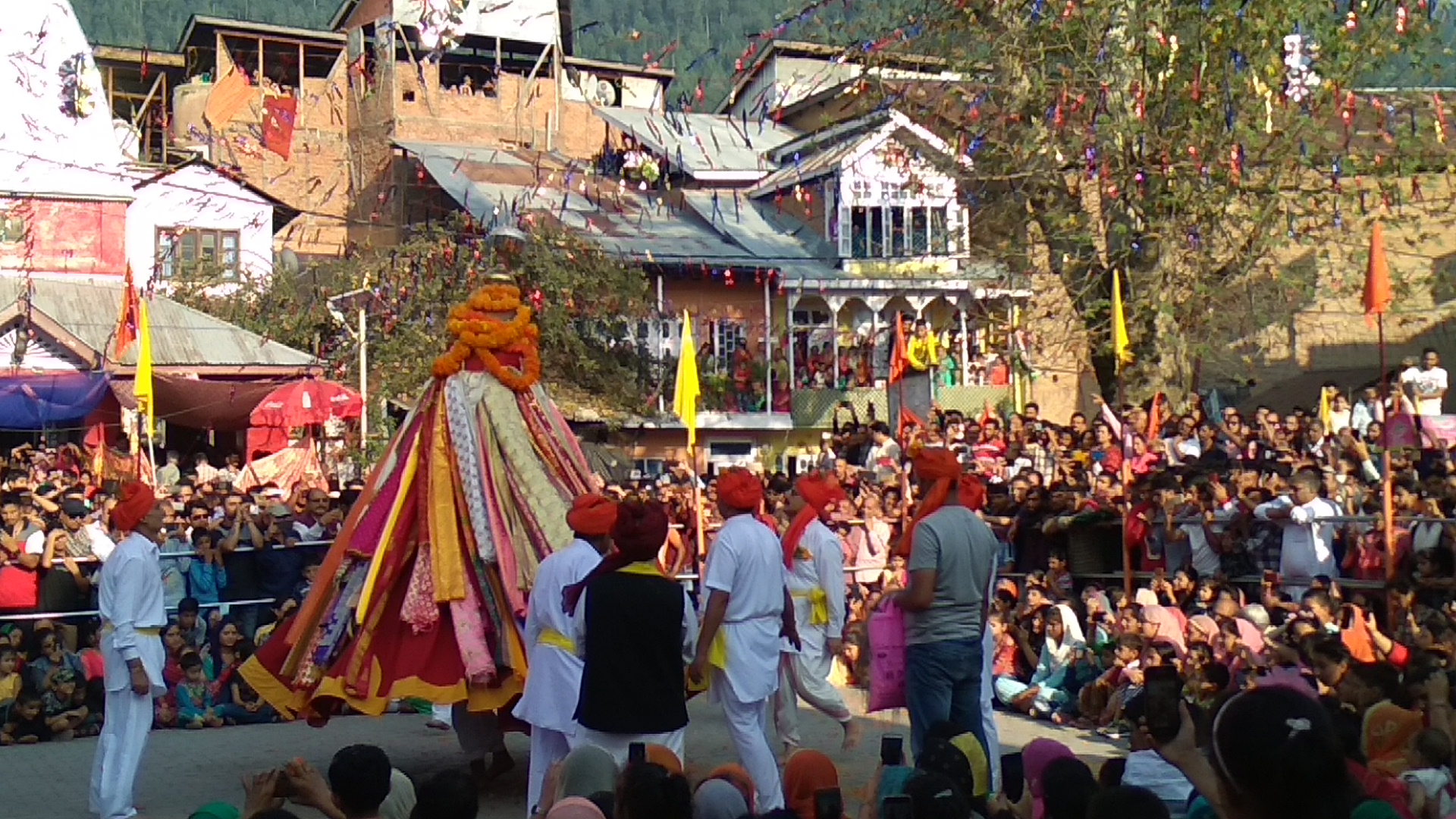
  Folk dance performed by the Bhaderwahi-Pahari people
  Those who speak these languages are derived from Rajput clans popularly known as Rana, Parihar, Chandail, Charak, Chib etc. The Bhadarwahi, Sarazi, Bhalesi, Padri and Gaddi language mainly found in Doda, Ramban and Kathua districts of Jammu region, while speakers of Gujari are found in the entire state.
- Speakers of Lahnda dialects including Pahari–Pothwari in Azad Kashmir and Hindko. These language covers most of the territory of Jammu and Azad Kashmir. People of Azad Kashmir despite not being ethnic Kashmiris possess a strong sense of Kashmiri national identity that overrides linguistic identification with closely related groups outside Azad Kashmir, such as the Pothwari speaking Punjabis of the Pothohar region. The dialects are also spoken further east across the Line of Control into the Pir Panjal mountains in Indian Jammu and Kashmir. The population, estimated at 1 million, is found in the region between the Jhelum and Chenab rivers: most significantly in the districts of Poonch and Rajouri, to a lesser extent in neighbouring Baramulla and Kupwara, and also – as a result of the influx of refugees during the Partition of 1947 – scattered throughout the rest of Jammu and Kashmir.

== Scheduled Tribes status ==
The Government of Jammu and Kashmir established an advisory board for the development of Pahari speakers in 1989. Though the community demanded Scheduled Tribe status on the basis of their remoteness and backwardness.

In April 2020, the government of Jammu and Kashmir granted to "Pahari-speaking people" four percent reservation for direct recruitment and admission and distribution of seats in professional institutions. This has sparked disagreements between representatives of the two unrelated "Pahari" communities – those of eastern Kashmir and those of mountains of western Jammu – as to which group of the two constitutes the "genuine Paharis" with a more disadvantaged status, and therefore stronger claim to receiving the benefits of the reservation policy.

=== Opposition by Gujjars ===
The Gujjars who have been already listed as Scheduled Tribes in Jammu and Kashmir in 1991, opposed Scheduled Tribe status to the Pahari Speaking People of Jammu and Kashmir with the argument regarding dilution of the Scheduled Tribe reservation. There has been controversy regarding the grant Scheduled Tribe status to Pahari Speaking People on the basis of their language.

In order to oppose the demand of listing Paharis in state's ST list, the Gujjar youth started foot March in November 2022, and after 21 days of struggle the Joint Action Committee was invited by the Home Minister of India in New Delhi for a dialogue.

The Gujjars argue that majority of Pahari Speaking People belongs to upper class Muslims such as Syeds, Sudhan, Mughals, Rajputs, Kashmiris, and Hindus including Brahmins, Rajputs, Mahajans who do not face any social stigma or caste inequalitysimilar to the other tribes of Jammu and Kashmir. Gujjars further argued that the Pahari Speaking People do not belong to a Socially, Economically and Educationally backward class like Gujjars, Bakarwals, Gaddis, Sippis and Shina who are in the state's ST list.

Despite, a number of organisations of displaced communities consisting of West Pakistan refugees who were exiled during partition, residing primarily in Jammu have been struggling and demanding ST status for them claiming them as Pahari too. In addition to this, a share in 4% reservations in Government jobs was demanded to be granted to Pahari Speaking People (PSP) as these communities belongs to same clans of PSP falling under Lahnda group.

=== Inclusion as Scheduled Tribe ===
The status of Scheduled Tribes was provided to "Pahari Speaking People' through an Act passed by Parliament on 26 July 2023. The bill further added Pahari Ethnic Group along with the Paddaris, Kolis and Gadda Brahman in the existing list of scheduled tribes in Jammu and Kashmir and was introduced in the Lok Sabha. The bill was taken into consideration on February 6, 2024, and was passed the same day. The bill was further passed from the Rajya Sabha on February 9. The Act of Parliament received the President's Assent on the Constitution (Jammu and Kashmir) Scheduled Tribes Order (Amendment) Act, 2024. A gazette notification in this regard was issued by the Ministry of Law and Justice states on 12 February 2024.

== Status in Himachal Pradesh ==
The demand for the inclusion of Pahari (Himachali) under the Eight Schedule of the Constitution, to represent multiple Pahari languages of Himachal Pradesh, had been made in the year 2010 by the state's assembly. Due to political interest, the language is currently recorded as a dialect of Hindi, though having a poor mutual intelligibility with Hindi and higher one with other recognised languages like Dogri.

In October 2021, a PIL was also filed in the Himachal Pradesh High Court resurfasing the demand for recognizing Pahari (Himachali) or Western Pahari dialects spoken in state as one of the official languages and promoting language as the medium of instruction in primary and middle-level schools as per the National Education Policy, 2020.

== See also ==
- Pahari-Pothwari
