= Kangri language =

Western Pahari language of north India

Kangri
- कांगड़ी
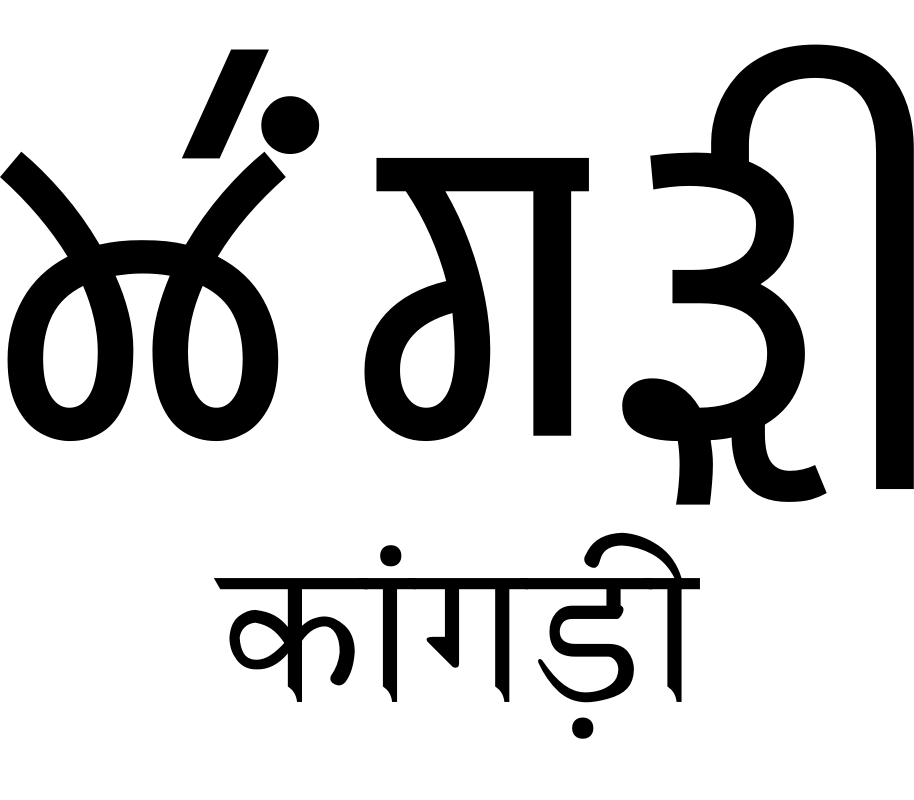
- Kangri written in Takri and Devanagari
- Native to: Himachal Pradesh; Punjab
- Region: Trigarta
- Native speakers: 1.1 million (2011)
- Language family: Indo-European: Indo-Iranian; Indo-Aryan; North-Western or Northern; Western Pahari; Kangri
- Writing system: Takri, Devanagari

Language codes
- ISO 639-3: xnr
- Glottolog: kang1280

Kangri (Takri: 𑚊𑚭𑚫𑚌𑚪𑚯) is a Western Pahari language, spoken in Himachal Pradesh, predominantly in the Kangra district, Hamirpur district and hilly parts of Una district as well as in some parts of Mandi and Chamba districts of Himachal Pradesh and in hilly parts of Pathankot and Hoshiarpur districts of Punjab. It is also spoken in few villages of Pakistan by the people belonging to the families migrated from Kangra region. It is associated with the people of the Kangra.

Like most of Indo-Aryan languages, Kangri does form a dialect continuum with its neighbouring languages. This includes the Pahari varieties spoken to the east Mandeali, north to Chambeali, Gaddi & Bhateali, south-east to Kahluri and Hinduri, Baghliani, Baghati and Keonthali dialects of Lower Mahasui. Besides it also share continuum north-west to Dogri. It is classified under Western Pahari.

== Script ==
The native script of the language is Takri Script but now people write Kangri Language in Devanagari script.

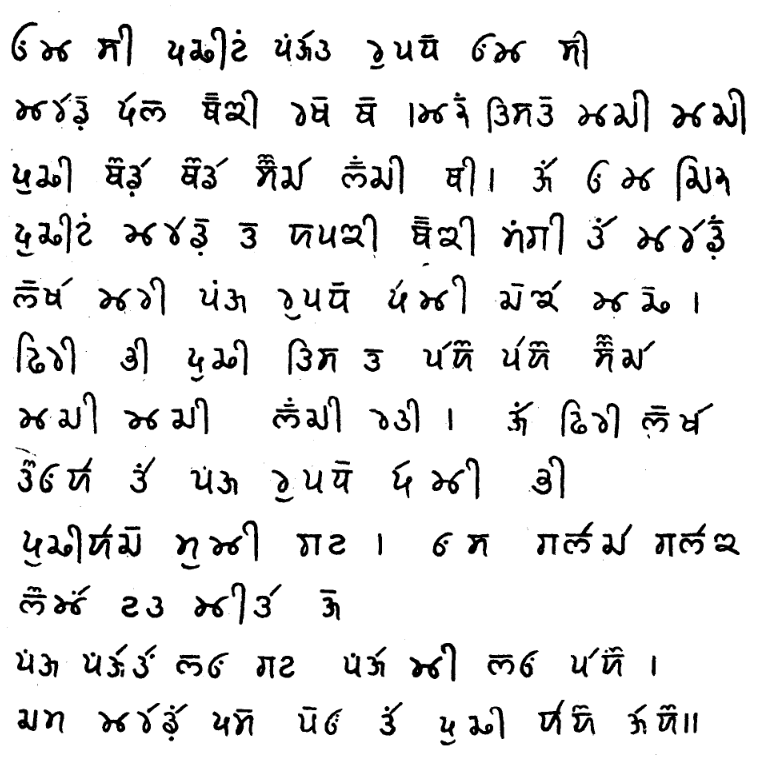
Specimen in Kangri language

== Phonology ==
=== Consonants ===
		Labial	Dental/ Alveolar	Retroflex	Post-alv./ Palatal	Velar	Glottal
Nasal		m	n	(ɳ)			
Plosive/ Affricate	voiceless	p	t	ʈ	tʃ	k	
Plosive/ Affricate	aspirated	pʰ	tʰ	ʈʰ	tʃʰ	kʰ	
Plosive/ Affricate	voiced	b	d	ɖ	dʒ	ɡ	
Fricative			s				ɦ
Lateral			l	ɭ			
Tap			ɾ	ɽ, ɽ̃			
Approximant					(j)		

- It is not clear whether or not [j] is considered as a separate phoneme, but it does occur in various phonetic environments.
- [ɳ] is heard mostly as either an allophone of /ɽ̃/, and as /n/ before a retroflex stop.

=== Vowels ===
	Front	Central	Back
Close	iː		uː
Near-close	ɪ		ʊ
Mid	e	ə	o
Open-mid			ɔ
Open	æ	ɑː	

- /e/ can also become lowered to a nasal [ɛ̃], after /ɽ̃/.

=== Tone ===
Kangri is a tonal language like Punjabi and Dogri but the assignment of tones differs in Kangri when compared to them.

Most of the surrounding language varieties (including Kangri) lack voiced, aspirated obstruents (J. C. Sharma 2002, Masica 1993). The cognates of Hindi voiced, aspirated obstruents are voiced but have no aspiration. They are distinct from the cognates of voiced unaspirated obstruents by the tone induced by the loss of aspiration. Another difference to note between Kangri and Punjabi/Dogri is that these forms surface as voiced consonants in Kangri, but voiceless consonants in Punjabi and Dogri. That is, Kangri has lost the aspiration (in gaining tone), but Punjabi and Dogri has lost both aspiration and voicing. It is likely that these are separate innovations which originated in the West (Punjab or Jammu & Kashmir) and have spread outwards. The loss of aspiration (and gaining of tone) has been fully realized in all three languages, but the loss of voicing has not yet reached Kangri.

== Grammar ==
=== Pronouns ===
The pronouns of Kangri for different persons and numbers are as follows:

Person	Number	Kangri	Roman	IPA
1st	Singular	मैं	Mai	mæ̃
1st	Plural	असाँ / अहाँ	Asa/Aha	əsãː / əhãː
2nd	Singular	तू	Tu	t̪u
2nd	Plural	तुसाँ / त्वहाँ	Tusa/Tuha	t̪usãː / t̪vəhãː
3rd	Singular & Plural	सै	Se	sæ

=== Noun Cases ===
Using the noun घर (/kʰər/, "home") as an example, the cases in Kangri are:

Case	Kangri	Hindi Equivalent	English Equivalent
Nominative	घर	घर	home
Accusative	घरे यो/जो	घर को	to home
Ergative	घरैँ	घर ने	(by) home
Comitative	घरेने	घर के साथ	with home
Instrumental	घरेते	घर से	through home
Dative	घरेताँइ	घर के लिए	for home
Ablative	घरेते	घर से	from home
Genitive	घरे दा / दे / दि / दियाँ	घर का / की / के	of home

==== Locatives ====
Case	Kangri	Hindi Equivalent	English Equivalent
Inessive	घरेच	घर में	in home
Adessive	घरे पर	घर पर	on home

==== Others ====
Case	Kangri	Hindi Equivalent	English Equivalent
Vocative	घर॑	ओ घर	O home
Semblative	घर देआ / दए / दइ / दीयाँ	घर सा / सी / से	like home
Similative	घरे साइ	घर जैसा	similar to home
Terminative	घरे तिक्कर	घर तक	up to home

==== Postpositional / Oblique forms ====
Noun	Singular	Plural
घर	घरे	घरेयाँ
घड़ा	घड़े	घड़ेयाँ
नदी	नदिया	नदियाँ
घ्यो	घ्यो	घ्योआँ

=== Adverbial Pronouns ===
		Interrogative	Relative	Distal	Proximate
Time	Kangri	काल्लु	जाल्लु	ताल्लु	हुण
Time	Hindi	कब	जब	तब	अब
Place	Kangri	कुथू	जिथ्थु / जेथ्थु	ओथ्थु / तिथ्थु	इथ्थु / एथ्थु
Place	Hindi	कहाँ	जहाँ	वहाँ	यहाँ
Manner	Kangri	कियाँ	जियाँ	तियाँ	इयाँ
Manner	Hindi	कैसे	जैसे	वैसे	ऐसे
Quantity	Kangri	कितना	जितना	तितना	इतना
Quantity	Hindi	कितना	जितना	उतना	इतना

== Status ==
Interview of Sahil in Kangri language at Dharamshala, India

The language is commonly clubbed as Pahari or Himachali. Some Dogri linguists have referred Kangri as part of their language due to similarities and decent mutual intelligibility between them. This is generally observed only in bordering lects due to dialect continuum present among many Indo-Aryan languages. Kangri writers & poets have been making submissions to Pahari language's cause under Himachal Pradesh Academy of Arts, Culture & Languages (HPAACL). The language has no official status. According to the United Nations Education, Scientific and Cultural Organisation (UNESCO), the language is of definitely endangered category, i.e. many Kangri children are not learning Kangri as their mother tongue any longer.

The demand for the inclusion of 'Western Pahari' under the Eight Schedule of the Constitution, which is supposed to represent multiple Pahari languages of Himachal Pradesh, had been made in the year 2010 by the state's Vidhan Sabha. There has been no positive progress on this matter since then, even after several small organisations demand for the preservation of the language.

Gautam Sharma Vyathit and Chandrarekha Dhadwal are noted for their contributions to the preservation of Kangri folk songs as well as their novel contributions to Kangri literature.
