= Pahari Kinnauri language =

Western Pahari language of Himachal Pradesh, India

Pahari Kinnauri
- Indo Aryan Kinnauri
- पहाड़ी किनौरी ओरास बोली Oras Boli
- Kinnauri Pahari and Oras Boli written in Takri Script.
- Native to: Himachal Pradesh
- Region: Mahasu
- Ethnicity: Scheduled castes of Kinnaur district
- Native speakers: (6,300 cited 1998 survey)
- Language family: Indo-European: Indo-Iranian; Indo-Aryan; Northern; Western Pahari (Himachali); Pahari Kinnauri
- Writing system: Takri, Devanagari

Language codes
- ISO 639-3: kjo
- Glottolog: hari1246

Pahari Kinnauri, or Kinnauri Pahari (Takri: 𑚊𑚮𑚝𑚵𑚤𑚯 𑚞𑚩𑚭𑚪𑚯), is the only Indo-Aryan language among the nine languages spoken in the Kinnaur district of Himachal Pradesh. It is also called Oras Boli (Takri: 𑚈𑚤𑚭𑚨 𑚠𑚴𑚥𑚯). It is spoken by the scheduled caste communities of Kinnaur district, Himachal Pradesh; the language used to be commonly known as 'Kinnauri tribal language', but this is now considered a derogatory term. It is not clear how distinct it is from other Western Pahari languages.

== Phonology ==
=== Consonants ===
		Labial	Dental/ Alveolar	Retroflex	Post-alv./ Palatal	Velar	Glottal
Nasal	voiced	m	n	ɳ		ŋ	
Nasal	breathy	mʱ	nʱ				
Stop/ Affricate	voiceless	p	t	ʈ	tɕ	k	
Stop/ Affricate	aspirated	pʰ	tʰ	ʈʰ	tɕʰ	kʰ	
Stop/ Affricate	voiced	b	d	ɖ	dʑ	ɡ	
Stop/ Affricate	breathy	bʱ	dʱ	ɖʱ	dʑʱ	ɡʱ	
Fricative			s		ɕ		h
Rhotic	voiced		r	ɽ			
Rhotic	breathy			ɽʱ			
Lateral	voiced		l	ɭ			
Lateral	breathy		lʱ				
Approximant		w			j		

=== Vowels ===
	Front	Central	Back
High	iː		uː
High	ɪ		ʊ
Mid	eː	ə	oː
Mid	ɛ	ə	ɔ
Low	(æ)	ɑ ɑː	

== Script ==
The native script of the language is a variety of Takri script.

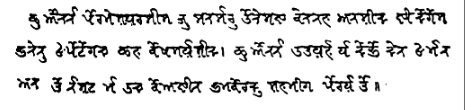
a specimen in Kinnauri language using Takri

== Status ==
The language is also commonly called Pahari or Himachali. The language has no official status and is recorded under Kinnauri or Pahari. According to the United Nations Education, Scientific and Cultural Organisation (UNESCO), the language is of definitely endangered category, i.e. many Kinnauri Pahari children are not learning Kinnauri Pahari as their mother tongue any longer. One of the reason is he favoritism towards Hindi by the Indian Government.

A demand for the inclusion of 'Pahari (Himachali)' under the Eight Schedule of the Constitution, which is supposed to represent multiple Pahari languages of Himachal Pradesh, was made in the year 2010 by the state's Vidhan Sabha. There has been no positive progress on this matter since then, despite small organisations making efforts to save the language. Due to political interest, the language is currently recorded as a dialect of Hindi, even when having a poor mutual intelligibility with it. As of now, there is no proposal to grant any status to Kinnauri.

== Relevant literature ==
- Kumar, Ajesh and Saramma Bezily (2015). Kinnauri Pahari: Phonemic Summary, Himachal Pradesh, India. Reckong Peo: Unpublished manuscript.
- Kim, HaeKyung. 2021. Split case system and Case marking on NPs in Kinnauri Pahari, Proceedings of the Payap University Research Symposium 2021, Chiang Mai. Feb. 12, 2021. Payap University: Research and Academic Service Affairs. 1203-1211.
- Kim, HaeKyung. 2019. Verb agreement in Kinnauri Pahari. Proceedings of the Payap Research Symposium 2019. Chiang Mai. Feb. 8, 2019. Payap University: Research and Academic Service Affairs. 760-772.
- Negi, Harvinder. "A sociolinguistic profile of the Kinnaura tribe." Nepalese Linguistics 27 (2012): 101-105.
- Saxena, Anju. "A Linguistic Sketch of Kinnauri Pahari." In The Linguistic Landscape of the Indian Himalayas, pp. 272–375. Brill, 2022.
