= Mandeali =

Western Pahari language of north India

- maṇḍiyālī
- 𑚢𑚘𑚶𑚖𑚮𑚣𑚭𑚥𑚯
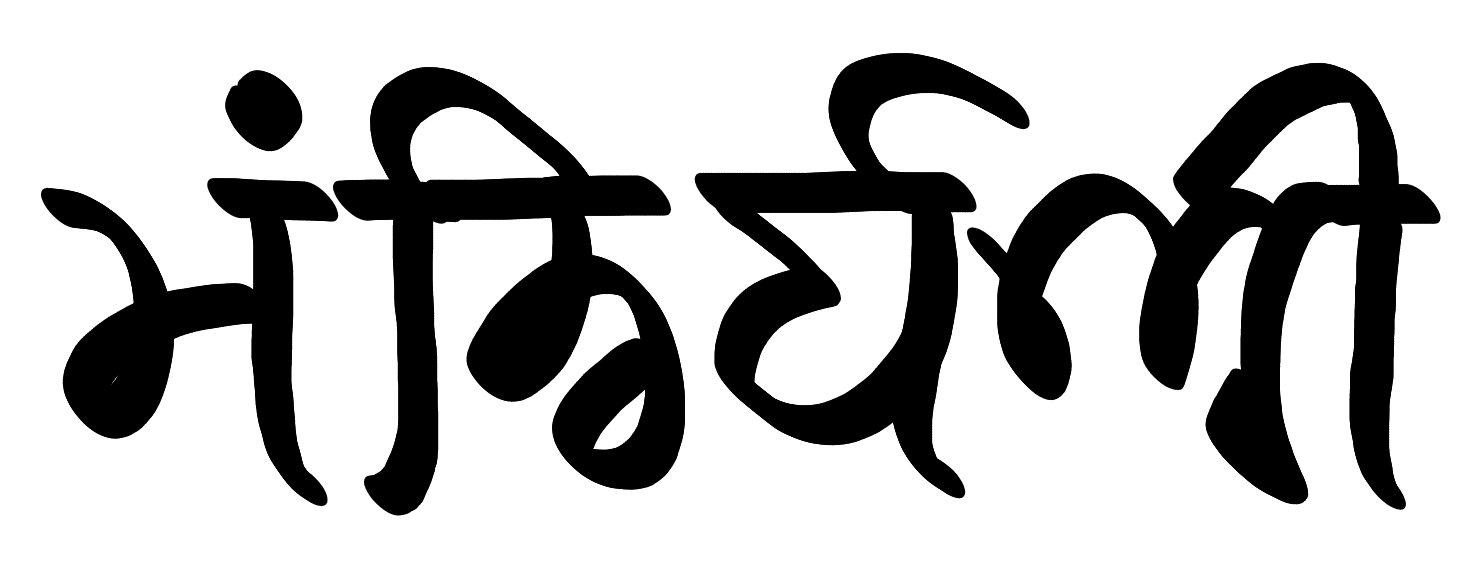
- Mandeali written in Mandi-Suket Takri Script
- Native to: Himachal Pradesh
- Region: Mahasu; Trigarta
- Ethnicity: Mandyali People
- Native speakers: 623,000 (2011 Census)
- Language family: Indo-European: Indo-Iranian; Indo-Aryan; Northern; Western Pahari; Mandeali
- Writing system: Mandiali Takri

Language codes
- ISO 639-3: mjl
- Glottolog: mand1409 Mandeali

Mandeali (Takri: 𑚢𑚘𑚶𑚖𑚮𑚣𑚭𑚥𑚯) is a Western Pahari language, spoken in northern India, predominantly in the Mandi district of Himachal Pradesh by the people of the Mandi Valley and particularly in the major city of Mandi. Other spellings for the name are Mandiyali and Mandiali. UNESCO reports it is one of the highly endangered languages of India. Speakers of the dialect have decreased by 21% from 1961 to 2001.

The language is distantly related to Kullui. The Chambealic varieties are often considered separate languages, but at least some are 90–95% intelligible with Mandeali proper. Its sub-dialect are different than Mandeali.

== Dialects ==
A light-hearted interview about Mandeali

Preliminary survey suggests speakers have functional intelligibility of Kangri. People in southeast Mandi district may have more difficulty understanding Kangri. Standard Mandeali is spoken throughout the broad valley running north and south from Jogindernagar to Sundarnagar. Mandeali Pahari is spoken north around Barot, east of Uhl River. Intelligible with difficulty to standard Mandeali. May be intermediate variety between Mandeali and Kullui. The dialect is very close to the Kullvi spoken in neighbouring lug valley region of Kullu district and are culturally, linguistically closer to Kullu. Southeast district contains transition to Mahasui. The dialect spoken is also sometimes referred as Suketi or dialect of Outer Seraj Area as dialect is an intermediate variety of Kullvi and Upper Mahasuvi of neighbouring Shimla and Kullu district. In the west, Sarkaghat is also a bit different from standard Mandeali, perhaps forming a transition towards Hamirpur and Bilaspur areas. Lexical similarity: 89% with Palampuri dialect of Kangri, 83% with Chambeali.

== Phonology ==
=== Consonants ===
		Labial	Dental	Alveolar	Retroflex	Post-alv./ Palatal	Velar	Glottal
Plosive / Affricate	voiceless	p	t		ʈ	tʃ	k	
Plosive / Affricate	aspriated	pʰ	tʰ		ʈʰ	tʃʰ	kʰ	
Plosive / Affricate	voiced	b	d		ɖ	dʒ	ɡ	
Plosive / Affricate	breathy	bʱ	dʱ		ɖʱ	dʒʱ	ɡʱ	
Fricative	voiceless			s		(ʃ)		ɦ
Fricative	voiced							ɦ
Nasal		m		n	ɳ		(ŋ)	
Lateral				l	ɭ			
Trill/Tap				r	ɽ ɽʱ			
Approximant						j	w	

- [ŋ] is heard when a nasal occurs before velar stops.
- [f] can be heard as an allophone of pʰ.
- Aspirated versions of m, n,ɳ, l,ɭ, r, w can be considered as separate phonemes.

=== Vowels ===
The vowels of Mandeali language are shown below.

	Front	Central	Back
Close	i iː		u uː
Mid	(e) eː	ə əː	(o) oː
Open-mid	ɛː		ɔː
Open		aː	

== Grammar ==
=== Nouns ===
Mandeali distinguishes two genders (Masculine and feminine), two numbers (Singular and plural) and four cases of direct, oblique, vocative, and ergative. Oblique also serves as locative and ergative also performs the function of instrumental. Nouns may be further divided into extended and unextended declensional subtypes, with the former characteristically consisting of masculines ending in unaccented -ā and feminines in -ī.

The following tables displays the suffix paradigms.

Masculine
		Dir.	Obl.	Voc.	Erg.
unEx.	Sing.			-ā -𑚁	-ē -𑚆
unEx.	Pl.		-ā -𑚁	-ō -𑚈	-ē -𑚆
Ex.	Sing.	-ā -𑚁	-ē -𑚆	-ĕā -𑚆𑚁	-ē -𑚆
Ex.	Pl.	-ē -𑚆	-ĕā -𑚆𑚁	-ĕō -𑚆𑚈	-ē -𑚆

Feminine
	Dir.	Obl.	Voc.	Erg.
Sing.			-ē -𑚆	-ē -𑚆
Pl.	-ā -𑚁		-ō -𑚈	-ē -𑚆

The following table of noun declensions shows those suffix paradigms in action. Examples include ghōṛā "stallion", mhaṭhī "girl" (also referred to as "maṭṭhī" or in takri "𑚢𑚔𑚶𑚕𑚯"), ghəːr "house", kāndh "wall".

Extended
		Dir.	Obl.	Voc.	Erg.
Masc.	Sing.	ghōṛā 𑚍𑚴𑚪𑚭	ghōṛe 𑚍𑚴𑚪𑚲	ghōṛĕā 𑚍𑚴𑚪𑚲𑚣𑚭	ghōṛe 𑚍𑚴𑚪𑚲
Masc.	Pl.	ghōṛe 𑚍𑚴𑚪𑚲	ghōṛĕā 𑚍𑚴𑚪𑚲𑚣𑚭	ghōṛĕō 𑚍𑚴𑚪𑚲𑚣𑚴	ghōṛē 𑚍𑚴𑚪𑚲
Fem.	Sing.	mhaṭhī 𑚢𑚶𑚩𑚕𑚯	mhaṭhī(ā) 𑚢𑚶𑚩𑚕𑚯(𑚣𑚭)	mhaṭhīē 𑚢𑚶𑚩𑚕𑚯𑚆	mhaṭhīē 𑚢𑚶𑚩𑚕𑚯𑚆
Fem.	Pl.	mhaṭhīā 𑚢𑚶𑚩𑚕𑚯𑚣𑚭		mhaṭhīō 𑚢𑚶𑚩𑚕𑚯𑚣𑚴	mhaṭhīē 𑚢𑚶𑚩𑚕𑚯𑚆

Unextended
		Dir.	Obl.	Voc.	Erg.
Masc.	Sing.	ghar 𑚍𑚤	gharā 𑚍𑚤𑚭	gharā 𑚍𑚤𑚭	gharē 𑚍𑚤𑚲
Masc.	Pl.	ghar 𑚍𑚤	gharā 𑚍𑚤𑚭	gharō 𑚍𑚤𑚴	gharē 𑚍𑚤𑚲
Fem.	Sing.	kāndh 𑚊𑚭𑚫𑚜	kāndhā 𑚊𑚭𑚫𑚜𑚭	kāndhē 𑚊𑚭𑚫𑚜𑚲	kāndhē 𑚊𑚭𑚫𑚜𑚲
Fem.	Pl.	kāndhā 𑚊𑚭𑚫𑚜𑚭		kāndhō 𑚊𑚭𑚫𑚜𑚴	kāndhē 𑚊𑚭𑚫𑚜𑚲

=== Adjectives ===
Adjectives may be divided into declinable and indeclinable categories. Declinable adjectives have endings that change by the gender, number and case of the noun that they qualify. Declinable adjective have endings that are similar but much simpler than those of nouns:

			Sing.	Pl.
Declin.	Masc.	Dir.	-ā -𑚁	-ē -𑚆
Declin.	Masc.	Obl.	-ē -𑚆	-ē -𑚆
Declin.	Fem.		-ī -𑚃	-ī -𑚃
Indeclin.				

Indeclinable adjectives are invariable and can end in either consonants or vowels (including ā and ī ). The direct masculine singular (-ā) is the citation form. Most adjectives ending in consonants are indeclinable.

Declinable adjective bānkā (𑚠𑚭𑚫𑚊𑚭) "good" in attributive use

		Dir.	Obl.	Voc.	Erg.
Masc.	Sing.	bānkā ghōṛā 𑚠𑚭𑚫𑚊𑚭 𑚍𑚴𑚪𑚭	bānkē ghōṛē 𑚠𑚭𑚫𑚊𑚲 𑚍𑚴𑚪𑚲	bānkē ghoṛĕā 𑚠𑚭𑚫𑚊𑚲 𑚍𑚴𑚪𑚲𑚁	bānkē ghōṛē 𑚠𑚭𑚫𑚊𑚲 𑚍𑚴𑚪𑚲
Masc.	Pl.	bānkē ghōṛē 𑚠𑚭𑚫𑚊𑚲 𑚍𑚴𑚪𑚲	bānkē ghōṛĕā 𑚠𑚭𑚫𑚊𑚲 𑚍𑚴𑚪𑚲𑚁	bānkē ghōṛĕō 𑚠𑚭𑚫𑚊𑚲 𑚍𑚴𑚪𑚲𑚈	bānkē ghōṛē 𑚠𑚭𑚫𑚊𑚲 𑚍𑚴𑚪𑚲
Fem.	Sing.	bānkī mhaṭhī 𑚠𑚭𑚫𑚊𑚯 𑚢𑚶𑚩𑚕𑚯		bānkī mhaṭhīē 𑚠𑚭𑚫𑚊𑚯 𑚢𑚶𑚩𑚕𑚯𑚆	bānkī mhaṭhīē 𑚠𑚭𑚫𑚊𑚯 𑚢𑚶𑚩𑚕𑚯𑚆
Fem.	Pl.	bānkī mhaṭhīā 𑚠𑚭𑚫𑚊𑚯 𑚢𑚶𑚩𑚕𑚯𑚁		bānkī mhaṭhīō 𑚠𑚭𑚫𑚊𑚯 𑚢𑚶𑚩𑚕𑚯𑚈	bānkī mhaṭhīē 𑚠𑚭𑚫𑚊𑚯 𑚢𑚶𑚩𑚕𑚯𑚆

		Dir.	Obl.	Voc.	Erg.
Masc.	Sing.	bānkā ghar 𑚠𑚭𑚫𑚊𑚭 𑚍𑚤	bānkē gharā 𑚠𑚭𑚫𑚊𑚲 𑚍𑚤𑚭	bānkē gharā 𑚠𑚭𑚫𑚊𑚲 𑚍𑚤𑚭	bānkē gharē 𑚠𑚭𑚫𑚊𑚲 𑚍𑚤𑚲
Masc.	Pl.	bānkē ghar 𑚠𑚭𑚫𑚊𑚲 𑚍𑚤	bānkē gharā 𑚠𑚭𑚫𑚊𑚲 𑚍𑚤𑚭	bānkē gharō 𑚠𑚭𑚫𑚊𑚲 𑚍𑚤𑚴	bānkē gharē 𑚠𑚭𑚫𑚊𑚲 𑚍𑚤𑚲
Fem.	Sing.	bānkī kāndh 𑚠𑚭𑚫𑚊𑚯 𑚊𑚭𑚫𑚜	bānkī kāndhā 𑚠𑚭𑚫𑚊𑚯 𑚊𑚭𑚫𑚜𑚭	bānkī kāndhē 𑚠𑚭𑚫𑚊𑚯 𑚊𑚭𑚫𑚜𑚲	bānkī kāndhē 𑚠𑚭𑚫𑚊𑚯 𑚊𑚭𑚫𑚜𑚲
Fem.	Pl.	bānkī kāndhā 𑚠𑚭𑚫𑚊𑚯 𑚊𑚭𑚫𑚜𑚭		bānkī kāndhō 𑚠𑚭𑚫𑚊𑚯 𑚊𑚭𑚫𑚜𑚴	bānkī kāndhē 𑚠𑚭𑚫𑚊𑚯 𑚊𑚭𑚫𑚜𑚲

Indeclinable adjective लाल "red" in attributive use

		Dir.	Obl.	Voc.	Erg.
Masc.	Sing.	lāl ghōṛā 𑚥𑚭𑚥 𑚍𑚴𑚪𑚭	lāl ghōṛē 𑚥𑚭𑚥 𑚍𑚴𑚪𑚲	lāl ghōṛē 𑚥𑚭𑚥 𑚍𑚴𑚪𑚲	lāl ghōṛē 𑚥𑚭𑚥 𑚍𑚴𑚪𑚲
Masc.	Pl.	lāl ghōṛē 𑚥𑚭𑚥 𑚍𑚴𑚪𑚲	lāl ghōṛeā 𑚥𑚭𑚥 𑚍𑚴𑚪𑚲𑚁	lāl ghōṛeā 𑚥𑚭𑚥 𑚍𑚴𑚪𑚲𑚁	lāl ghōṛē 𑚥𑚭𑚥 𑚍𑚴𑚪𑚲
Fem.	Sing.	lāl mhaṭhī 𑚥𑚭𑚥 𑚢𑚶𑚩𑚕𑚯		lāl mhaṭhīē 𑚥𑚭𑚥 𑚢𑚶𑚩𑚕𑚯𑚆	lāl mhaṭhīē 𑚥𑚭𑚥 𑚢𑚶𑚩𑚕𑚯𑚆
Fem.	Pl.	lāl mhaṭhīā 𑚥𑚭𑚥 𑚢𑚶𑚩𑚕𑚯𑚁		lāl mhaṭhīō 𑚥𑚭𑚥 𑚢𑚶𑚩𑚕𑚯𑚈	lāl mhaṭhīē 𑚥𑚭𑚥 𑚢𑚶𑚩𑚕𑚯𑚆

		Dir.	Obl.	Voc.	Erg.
Masc.	Sing.	lāl ghar 𑚥𑚭𑚥 𑚍𑚤	lāl gharā 𑚥𑚭𑚥 𑚍𑚤𑚭	lāl gharā 𑚥𑚭𑚥 𑚍𑚤𑚭	lāl gharē 𑚥𑚭𑚥 𑚍𑚤𑚲
Masc.	Pl.	lāl ghar 𑚥𑚭𑚥 𑚍𑚤	lāl gharā 𑚥𑚭𑚥 𑚍𑚤𑚭	lāl gharō 𑚥𑚭𑚥 𑚍𑚤𑚴	lāl gharē 𑚥𑚭𑚥 𑚍𑚤𑚲
Fem.	Sing.	lāl kāndh 𑚥𑚭𑚥 𑚊𑚭𑚫𑚜	lāl kāndhā 𑚥𑚭𑚥 𑚊𑚭𑚫𑚜𑚭	lāl kāndhē 𑚥𑚭𑚥 𑚊𑚭𑚫𑚜𑚲	lāl kāndhē 𑚥𑚭𑚥 𑚊𑚭𑚫𑚜𑚲
Fem.	Pl.	lāl kāndhā 𑚥𑚭𑚥 𑚊𑚭𑚫𑚜𑚭		lāl kāndhō 𑚥𑚭𑚥 𑚊𑚭𑚫𑚜𑚴	lāl kāndhē 𑚥𑚭𑚥 𑚊𑚭𑚫𑚜𑚲

=== Postpositions ===
Mandeali uses a system of particles, known as postpositions. Their use with a noun or verb requires the noun or verb to take the oblique case, and they are the locus of grammatical function, or "case-marking"

	Transliteration	Takri	Functions
Used alone	rā, rī, rē	𑚤𑚭,𑚤𑚯,𑚤𑚲	genitive marker; declines like an adjective. Example: "X rā/rī/etc. Y" means "X's Y", with rā/rī/etc. agreeing with Y.
Used alone	jō	𑚑𑚴	marks the indirect object (dative marker), or, if definite, the direct object (accusative marker). Often contracted to 𑚈 e.g. 𑚙𑚰𑚨𑚶𑚨𑚲 𑚑𑚴 (tusse jo) to 𑚙𑚰𑚨𑚶𑚨𑚴 (tussau)
Used alone	lā/lē/tē	𑚥𑚭/𑚥𑚲/𑚙𑚲	ablative marker, "from"
Used alone	khō/khā	𑚋𑚴/𑚋𑚭	orientative marker; "towards"
Used alone	minjh	𑚢𑚮𑚫𑚒	inessive marker, "in." Often contracted to 'anjh
Used alone	tik,tikkar	𑚙𑚮𑚊/𑚙𑚮𑚊𑚶𑚊𑚤	terminative marker, "until, up to"
	bich	𑚠𑚮𑚏	inessive marker, "in." Often contracted to ach e.g 𑚢𑚘𑚶𑚖𑚯 𑚠𑚯𑚏 (Maṇḍī bich) to 𑚢𑚘𑚶𑚖𑚯𑚀𑚏 (Maṇḍīach)
May use a secondary preposition	kanē/sāugī	𑚊𑚝𑚲/𑚨𑚭𑚄𑚌𑚯	comitative marker, "with" Often contracted to nē/kē
May use a secondary preposition	gās	𑚌𑚭𑚨	superessive marker, "on" or "at."
May use a secondary preposition	bālē	𑚠𑚭𑚥𑚲	possessive marker; "with" (as in possession) e.g. म्हठीया बाले "in the girl's possession."
May use a secondary preposition	bārē	𑚠𑚭𑚤𑚲	"about"
May use a secondary preposition	kaṭhē	𑚊𑚕𑚲	benefactive marker; "for"
May use a secondary preposition	sāhī̃	𑚨𑚭𑚩𑚯𑚫	comparative marker; "like" (in resemblance)
May use a secondary preposition	bājhī	𑚠𑚭𑚒𑚯	abessive marker; "without"
May use a secondary preposition	bālē/nēḍē	𑚠𑚭𑚥𑚲/𑚝𑚲𑚖𑚲	"near"
May use a secondary preposition	lāgē	𑚥𑚭𑚌𑚲	apudessive marker; "adjacent/next to"
May use a secondary preposition	bhītar	𑚡𑚯𑚙𑚤	"inside"
May use a secondary preposition	bāhar	𑚠𑚭𑚩𑚤	"outside"

Other postpositions are adverbs, following their obliqued targets either directly or with the inflected genitive linker rē; e.g. ghōṛē (rē) kanē/sāugī "with the stallion". But nowadays it's more common to not use the genitive linker rē

=== Pronouns ===
The pronouns of Mandeali for different persons and numbers are as follows:

Person	Number	Mandeali	IPA
1st	Singular	𑚩𑚭𑚅𑚫	ɦaːũ
1st	Plural	𑚁𑚨𑚶𑚨𑚲	asːe
2nd	Singular	𑚙𑚱	tu
2nd	Plural	𑚙𑚰𑚨𑚶𑚨𑚲	t̪usːe
3rd Proximate	Singular	𑚆 / 𑚣𑚲	eː / jeː
3rd Proximate	Plural	𑚣𑚴𑚫	jõː
3rd Distal	Singular	𑚨𑚲	seː
3rd Distal	Plural	𑚨𑚶𑚣𑚴𑚫	sjõː

=== Noun Cases ===
Using the noun 𑚍𑚤 (/gʱəːr/, "home") as an example, the cases in Mandeali are:

Case	Mandeali	Hindi Equivalent	English Equivalent
Nominative	𑚍𑚤	घर	home
Accusative	𑚍𑚤𑚴 / 𑚍𑚤𑚭 𑚑𑚴	घर को	to home
Ergative	𑚍𑚤𑚲	घर ने	(by) home
Comitative	𑚍𑚤𑚭 𑚊𑚲 / 𑚍𑚤𑚭 𑚊𑚝𑚶𑚝𑚲 / 𑚍𑚤𑚭 𑚨𑚭𑚄𑚌𑚯	घर के साथ	with home
Instrumental	𑚍𑚤𑚭 𑚥𑚲 / 𑚍𑚤𑚭 𑚥𑚭	घर से	through home
Dative	𑚍𑚤𑚭 𑚊𑚔𑚶𑚕𑚲	घर के लिए	for home
Ablative	𑚍𑚤𑚭 𑚥𑚲 / 𑚍𑚤𑚭 𑚥𑚭	घर से	from home
Genitive	𑚍𑚤𑚭 𑚤𑚭 / 𑚤𑚲 / 𑚤𑚯	घर का / की / के	of home

==== Locatives ====
Case	Mandeali	Hindi Equivalent	English Equivalent
Inessive	𑚍𑚤𑚭 / 𑚍𑚤𑚭 𑚢𑚫𑚒 / 𑚍𑚤 𑚠𑚮𑚏 / 𑚍𑚤𑚏	घर में	in (home)
Adessive	𑚍𑚤𑚭 𑚌𑚭𑚨 / 𑚞𑚶𑚤𑚣𑚭𑚥𑚶𑚩𑚲 / 𑚞𑚤	घर पर	on (home)

==== Others ====
Case	Mandeali	Hindi Equivalent	English Equivalent
Vocative	𑚍𑚤𑚭 (sing.) / 𑚍𑚤𑚴 (pl.)	ओ घर	O home
Similative	𑚍𑚤𑚭 𑚨𑚭𑚫𑚩𑚯𑚫	घर जैसा	similar to home
Terminative	𑚍𑚤𑚭 𑚙𑚮𑚊𑚶𑚊𑚤 / 𑚙𑚮𑚊	घर तक	up to home

=== Numerals ===
Numeral	Mandeali	Transliteration
1	𑚆𑚊𑚶𑚊	ekk
2	𑚛𑚰𑚃	duī
3	𑚙𑚶𑚤𑚭𑚆	trāe
4	𑚏𑚭𑚤	chār
5	𑚞𑚭𑚫𑚑	pānj
6	𑚐𑚲𑚩	chheh
7	𑚨𑚭𑚙𑚶𑚙	sātt
8	𑚁𑚕	āṭh
9	𑚝𑚵	nau
10	𑚛𑚨	das
11	𑚌𑚶𑚣𑚭𑚤𑚭	gyārā
12	𑚠𑚭𑚤𑚭	bārā
13	𑚙𑚲𑚩𑚤𑚭	tehrā
14	𑚏𑚄𑚛𑚭	chaudā
15	𑚞𑚫𑚛𑚶𑚤𑚭	pandrā
16	𑚨𑚴𑚥𑚷𑚭	soḷā
17	𑚨𑚙𑚭𑚤𑚭	satārā
18	𑚕𑚭𑚤𑚭	ṭhārā
19	𑚄𑚝𑚶𑚝𑚯	unni
20	𑚠𑚯𑚩	bīh

== Script ==
The native script of the language is a variety of Takri called Mandeali Takri.

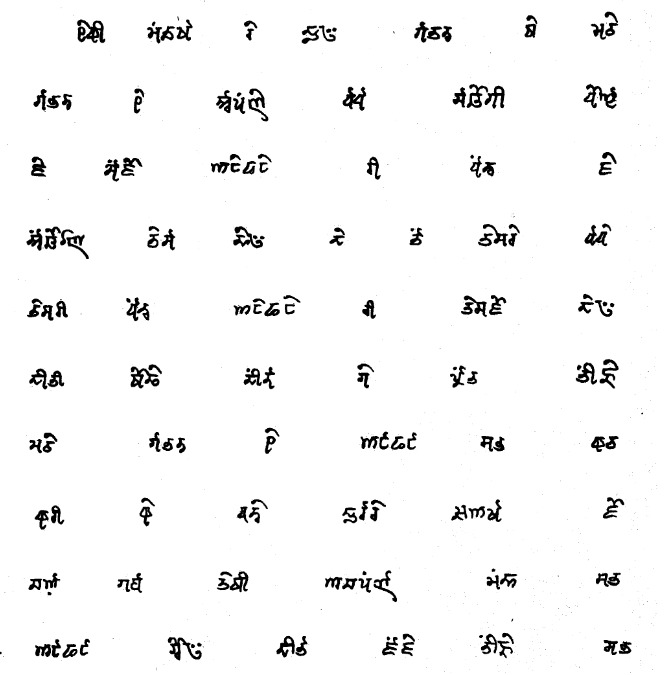
Specimen in Mandeali language

== Vocabulary ==
=== Samples ===
Words/phrases	Transliteration	Meaning
𑚑𑚳𑚛𑚣𑚭	jaidyā	Hello/Salutation
𑚊𑚲𑚚𑚯	kethī	Where?
𑚊𑚯	kī	Why?
𑚊𑚮𑚩𑚶𑚣𑚭𑚫	kihyān	How?
𑚊𑚲𑚨𑚤𑚭/𑚊𑚴𑚨𑚤𑚭	kosrā/kesrā	Whose?
𑚊𑚰𑚘	kuṇ	Who?
𑚊𑚲𑚙𑚶𑚤𑚭	ketrā	How many?
𑚊𑚲𑚖𑚶𑚖𑚭	keḍḍā	How much?
𑚊𑚲𑚪𑚲 𑚩𑚲 𑚙𑚰𑚨𑚶𑚨𑚲?	keṛhe he tusse?	How are you ?
𑚊𑚲𑚚𑚯 𑚑𑚴 𑚥𑚌𑚯𑚤𑚲 𑚑𑚭𑚫𑚛𑚲?	kethī jo lagīre jānde?	Where are you going?
𑚊𑚶𑚣𑚭 𑚩𑚰𑚃 𑚌𑚶𑚣𑚭?	kyā huī gyā?	What happened?
𑚙𑚰𑚨𑚶𑚨𑚭𑚤𑚭 𑚝𑚭𑚈𑚫 𑚊𑚶𑚣𑚭 𑚩𑚭?	tussārā nāõ kyā hā?	What is your name?
𑚩𑚭𑚫𑚖𑚘𑚭 𑚛𑚲 𑚢𑚭𑚫𑚑𑚴 𑚙𑚱।	hāṇdṇā de mānjo tū.	Let me walk.
𑚊𑚲𑚚𑚯 𑚥𑚭/𑚙𑚲 𑚁𑚃𑚤𑚲 𑚙𑚰𑚨𑚶𑚨𑚲?	kethī lā/te āīre tusse?	From where have you come?

=== Names of months ===
Traditionally, the month formats is based on Hindu calendar.

List of Months in Mandeali
Mandeali	Transliteration	English
𑚏𑚂𑚙𑚤	chaitar	March–April
𑚠𑚨𑚭𑚋	basākh	April–May
𑚑𑚲𑚕	jeṭh	May–June
𑚩𑚭𑚩𑚶𑚪	hāhṛ	June–July
𑚨𑚭𑚈𑚘	sāoṇ	July–August
𑚡𑚭𑚛𑚶𑚤𑚴	bhādro	August–September
𑚨𑚵𑚑	sauj	September–October
𑚊𑚭𑚙𑚊	kātak	October–November
𑚢𑚫𑚌𑚨𑚤	mangsar	November–December
𑚞𑚵𑚨	paus	December–January
𑚢𑚭𑚍	māgh	January–February
𑚟𑚭𑚌𑚘	phāgaṇ	February–March

=== Names of days ===
Days are generally indic.

List of days in Mandeali
Mandeali	Transliteration	English
𑚙𑚶𑚦𑚭𑚤	Twār	Sunday
𑚨𑚴𑚢𑚠𑚭𑚤	Sombār	Monday
𑚢𑚫𑚌𑚥𑚷𑚠𑚭𑚤	Mangaḷbār	Tuesday
𑚠𑚰𑚛𑚶𑚜𑚠𑚭𑚤	Buddhbār	Wednesday
𑚠𑚯𑚤𑚠𑚭𑚤	Bīrvaar	Thursday
𑚨𑚰𑚊𑚶𑚊𑚤𑚠𑚭𑚤	Sukkarbār	Friday
𑚨𑚝𑚮𑚏𑚤	Sanichar	Saturday

•Twār is a loan word from Urdu (Itwār)

== Sample text ==
This sample text is a translated version of the fable "A Thirsty Crow" .

=== Tankri ===
𑚆𑚊 𑚠𑚭𑚤𑚯 𑚆𑚊 𑚊𑚭𑚈 𑚚𑚭। 𑚙𑚲𑚨𑚑𑚴 (𑚙𑚲𑚒𑚴) 𑚊𑚠𑚥𑚭 𑚨𑚴𑚸 𑚥𑚌𑚯𑚤𑚭 𑚚𑚭। 𑚞𑚭𑚘𑚯 𑚔𑚴𑚥𑚷𑚝𑚲 𑚊𑚔𑚶𑚕𑚲 𑚨𑚲 𑚈𑚤𑚲 𑚞𑚤𑚲 𑚥𑚌𑚯𑚤𑚭 𑚚𑚭 𑚄𑚖𑚛𑚭। 𑚸𑚤𑚯 𑚠𑚲𑚤𑚭 𑚙𑚮𑚊 𑚄𑚖𑚰𑚁𑚫 𑚠𑚯 𑚙𑚲𑚒𑚴 𑚞𑚭𑚘𑚯 𑚝𑚯𑚫 𑚢𑚮𑚥𑚣𑚭, 𑚚𑚊𑚰𑚁𑚫 𑚨𑚲 𑚆𑚊𑚯 𑚖𑚴𑚩𑚤𑚯𑚣𑚭 𑚠𑚪𑚣𑚭, 𑚙𑚭 𑚙𑚲𑚚𑚯 𑚙𑚲𑚒𑚴 𑚆𑚊 𑚍𑚪𑚴𑚥𑚱 𑚨𑚰𑚒𑚣𑚭। 𑚨𑚲 𑚙𑚲𑚨 𑚍𑚪𑚴𑚥𑚱 𑚠𑚭𑚥𑚲 𑚌𑚣𑚭। 𑚙𑚮𑚝𑚲 𑚙𑚮𑚜𑚯 𑚢𑚫𑚒 𑚡𑚭𑚥𑚷𑚣𑚭 𑚙𑚭 𑚙𑚲𑚙𑚭 𑚤𑚙𑚯 𑚒𑚲 𑚞𑚭𑚘𑚯 𑚚𑚭। 𑚙𑚮𑚝𑚲 𑚞𑚭𑚘𑚯 𑚞𑚯𑚘𑚲 𑚊𑚔𑚶𑚕𑚲 𑚁𑚞𑚘𑚯 𑚏𑚱𑚫𑚑 𑚙𑚮𑚜𑚯𑚣𑚭 𑚞𑚭𑚃, 𑚞𑚤 𑚞𑚭𑚘𑚯 𑚠𑚪𑚲 𑚩𑚲𑚕 𑚚𑚭 𑚙𑚭 𑚙𑚲𑚨𑚤𑚯 𑚏𑚱𑚫𑚑 𑚞𑚭𑚘𑚯 𑚙𑚮𑚊 𑚝𑚯𑚫 𑚞𑚰𑚒𑚯 𑚩𑚰𑚃, 𑚊𑚝𑚲 𑚨𑚲 𑚛𑚰𑚸𑚯 𑚩𑚰𑚃 𑚌𑚣𑚭। 𑚟𑚲𑚤𑚯 𑚙𑚲𑚒𑚴 𑚈𑚤𑚸𑚭 𑚞𑚤𑚸𑚭 𑚡𑚙𑚲𑚤𑚲 𑚌𑚔𑚲 𑚞𑚃𑚤𑚲 𑚨𑚰𑚒𑚲, 𑚙𑚮𑚝𑚲 𑚨𑚶𑚣𑚴𑚫 𑚌𑚔𑚲 𑚁𑚞𑚘𑚯 𑚏𑚱𑚫𑚑𑚭 𑚊𑚲 𑚔𑚯𑚞𑚰𑚁𑚫 𑚙𑚲𑚨 𑚍𑚪𑚴𑚥𑚱𑚁 𑚡𑚯𑚙𑚤𑚴 𑚞𑚭𑚘𑚲 𑚥𑚭𑚆। 𑚨𑚰𑚥𑚲 𑚨𑚰𑚥𑚲 𑚊𑚤𑚰𑚁𑚫 𑚞𑚭𑚘𑚯 𑚌𑚭𑚨𑚭 𑚑𑚴 𑚥𑚌𑚣𑚭 𑚁𑚄𑚫𑚛𑚭, 𑚩𑚴𑚤 𑚞𑚭𑚘𑚯 𑚙𑚲𑚨𑚤𑚯 𑚏𑚱𑚫𑚑𑚭 𑚙𑚮𑚊𑚤 𑚞𑚰𑚑𑚯 𑚁𑚣𑚭, 𑚟𑚲𑚤𑚯 𑚙𑚮𑚝𑚲 𑚤𑚭𑚢𑚭 𑚏𑚭𑚘𑚲 𑚞𑚭𑚘𑚯 𑚞𑚮𑚙𑚣𑚭 𑚩𑚴𑚤 𑚁𑚞𑚘𑚭 𑚨𑚴𑚸 𑚢𑚔𑚭𑚣𑚭,𑚩𑚴𑚤 𑚙𑚲𑚚𑚯 𑚥𑚭 𑚄𑚖𑚰𑚁𑚫 𑚏𑚥𑚯 𑚌𑚣𑚭।

=== Devanagari ===
एक बारी एक काओ था। तेसजो (तेझो) कबल्ला सोख लगीरा था। पाणी टोळने कट्ठे से ओरे परे लगीरा था उडदा। खरी बेरा तिक उडुआँ बी तेझो पाणी नीं मिलया, थकुआँ से एकी डोहरीया बड़या, ता तेथी तेझो एक घड़ोलू सुझया। से तेस घड़ोलू बाले गया। तिन्ने तिधी मंझ भाळया ता तेता रत्ती झे पाणी था। तिन्ने पाणी पीणे कट्ठे आपणी चूंज तिधीया पाई, पर पाणी बड़े हेठ था ता तेसरी चूंज पाणी तिक नीं पुझी हुई, कने से दुखी हुई गया। फेरी तेझो ओरखा परखा भतेरे गट्टे पईरे सुझे, तिन्ने स्यों गट्टे आपणी चूंजा के टीपुआँ तेस घड़ोलूआ भीतरो पाणे लाए। सुले सुले करुआँ पाणी गासा जो लगया आउंदा, होर पाणी तेसरी चूंजा तिक्कर पुजी आया, फेरी तिन्ने रामा चाणे पाणी पितया होर आपणा सोख मटाया,होर तेथी ला उडुआँ चली गया।

==== Transliteration ====
Ek bārī ek kāo thā. Tesjo (tejho) kaballā sokh lagīrā thā. Pāṇī ṭoḷane kaṭṭhe se ore pare lagīrā thā uḍadā. Kharī berā tik uḍuā̃ bī tejho pāṇī nī̃ milyā, thakuā̃ se ekī ḍohrīyā baṛyā, tā tethī tejho ek ghaṛolū sujhyā. Se tes ghaṛolū bāle gayā. Tinne tidhī mañjh bhāḷyā tā tetā rattī jhe pāṇī thā. Tinne pāṇī pīṇe kaṭṭhe āpṇī cūñj tidhīyā pāī, par pāṇī baṛe heṭh thā tā tesrī cūñj pāṇī tik nī̃ pujhī huī, kane se dukhī huī gyā. Pherī tejho orkhā parkhā bhatere gaṭṭe paīre sujhe, tinne syõ gaṭṭe āpṇī cūñjā ke ṭīpuā̃ tes ghaṛolūā bhītro pāṇe lāe. Sule sule karuā̃ pāṇī gāsā jo lagyā āundā, hor pāṇī tesrī cūñjā tikkar pujī āyā, pherī tinne rāmā cāṇe pāṇī pityā hor āpṇā sokh maṭāyā,hor tethī lā uḍuā̃ calī gyā.

=== Translation ===
Once, there was a crow who was very thirsty. He flew here and there in search of water. Even after flying for a long time, he could not find any. Exhausted, he landed in a field, where he spotted a pitcher. He went up to it and looked inside, only to find a little bit of water. He dipped his beak in to drink, but the water was too low; his beak could not reach it, and he felt disheartened. Then, he noticed many pebbles lying nearby. He began picking them up with his beak and dropping them into the pitcher. Gradually, the water level rose until it reached his beak. He then drank the water comfortably, quenched his thirst, and flew away.

== Status ==
The language is commonly called Pahari or Himachali, just like many other neighbouring languages. The language has no official status. According to the United Nations Education, Scientific and Cultural Organisation (UNESCO), the language is of definitely endangered category, i.e. many Mandeali children are not learning Mandeali as their mother tongue anymore.

The demand for the inclusion of 'Pahari (Himachali)' under the Eight Schedule of the Constitution, which is supposed to represent multiple Pahari languages of Himachal Pradesh, had been made in the year 2010 by the state's Vidhan Sabha. There has been no positive progress on this matter since then even when small organisations strive to save the language and demand it. Due to political interest, the language is currently recorded as a dialect of Hindi, even when having a poor mutual intelligibility with it and being close to other Pahari languages such as Mahasui, Kahluri and Kangri.
