= Churahi =

Western Pahari language of Himachal Pradesh, India

- 𑚏𑚰𑚤𑚭𑚩𑚯, चुराही
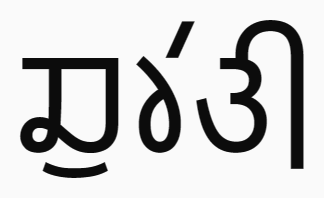
- The word "Churahi" written in Devanagari script
- Native to: Himachal Pradesh
- Region: Trigarta
- Native speakers: 76,000 (2011)
- Language family: Indo-European: Indo-Iranian; Indo-Aryan; Northern; Western Pahari; Churahi
- Writing system: Takri, Devanagari

Language codes
- ISO 639-3: cdj
- Glottolog: chur1258
- ELP: Churahi

Churahi (Takri: 𑚏𑚰𑚤𑚭𑚩𑚯) is a Western Pahari language of Himachal Pradesh, India. It is spoken in the Chaurah and Saluni tehsils of Chamba district, and is considered endangered.

== Phonology ==
=== Vowels ===
	Front		Central	Back	
	short	long	Central	short	long
Close	ɪ, ʏ	iː, yː	ɨ	ɯ, ʊ	uː
Close-mid		eː	ə		oː
Open-mid		æː	ə		ɔː
Open			aː		

=== Consonants ===
		Bilabial	Dental	Alveolar	Retroflex	Post-alv./ Palatal	Velar	Glottal
Nasal		m	n		ɳ		ŋ	
Stop/ Affricate	plain	p⠀b	t⠀d		ʈ⠀ɖ	tɕ⠀dʑ	k⠀ɡ	
Stop/ Affricate	aspirated	pʰ bʱ	tʰ dʱ		ʈʰ ɖʱ	tɕʰ dʑʱ	kʰ ɡʱ	
Fricative				s				h
Approximant		w	l		ɭ	j		
Trill			r		ɽ			

== Adages ==
𑚏𑚰𑚤𑚭𑚩𑚯	चुराही	Transliteration (ITRANS)	Equivalent Adage or meaning in English
𑚀𑚜𑚜𑚰 𑚢𑚳𑚩𑚘𑚰 𑚀𑚜𑚢𑚭	अधधु मैहणु अधमा	adhadhu maihaNu adhamA	Empty vessel makes much noise.
𑚆𑚅𑚖𑚯 𑚊𑚥 𑚑𑚙𑚤𑚱𑚖𑚭	एऊडी कल जतरूडा	eUDI kala jatarUDA	A bad deed has a bad outcome.
𑚢𑚤𑚝𑚰 𑚙 𑚜𑚶𑚤𑚰𑚦 𑚚𑚴𑚪𑚭 𑚊𑚤𑚝𑚯	मरनु त ध्रुव थॊड़ा करनी	maranu ta dhruva th^o.DA karanI	If one has to die, why make excuses?
𑚑𑚲𑚃 𑚊𑚭𑚥𑚱 𑚡𑚰𑚙𑚮𑚣𑚭 𑚙𑚲𑚃 𑚛𑚶𑚦𑚭𑚤𑚭 𑚡𑚲𑚪𑚮𑚣𑚴𑚤𑚱	जेई कालू भुतिया तेई द्वारा भेड़ियोरू	jeI kAlU bhutiyA teI dvArA bhe.DiyorU	To ignore some grave danger.

== Script ==
The native script of the language is Takri script.

== Status ==
The language is commonly called Pahari or Himachali. Some speaker may even call it a dialect of Dogri. The language has no official status. According to the United Nations Education, Scientific and Cultural Organisation (UNESCO), the language is of definitely endangered category, i.e. many Churahi children are not learning Churahi as their mother tongue any longer.

The demand for the inclusion of 'Pahari (Himachali)' under the Eighth Schedule of the Constitution, which is supposed to represent multiple Pahari languages of Himachal Pradesh, had been made in the year 2010 by the state's Vidhan Sabha. There has been no positive progress on this matter since then, even though small organisations are striving to save the language. Due to political interest, the language is currently recorded as a dialect of Hindi, even when having a poor mutual intelligibility with it and having a higher mutual intelligibility with other recognised languages like Dogri and other Western Pahari languages.
