= Northern Indo-Aryan languages =

Group of Indo-Aryan languages

Northern Indo-Aryan
- Pahari
- Geographic distribution: Nepal and north-western India
- Linguistic classification: Indo-European: Indo-Iranian; Indo-Aryan; Northern Indo-Aryan
- Early forms: Prakrit: Khasa Prakrit
- Subdivisions: Central; Western; Eastern

Language codes
- Glottolog: indo1310

Major Indo-Aryan languages of South Asia; Northern Aryan languages are in shades of brown

The Northern Indo-Aryan languages, also known as Pahāṛi languages, are a proposed group of Indo-Aryan languages spoken in the lower ranges of the Himalayas, from Nepal in the east, through the Indian states of Jammu and Kashmir, Uttarakhand, Himachal Pradesh and Punjab (not to be confused with the various other languages with that name) was coined by G. A. Grierson.

== Classification ==
The Pahari languages fall into three groups.

=== Eastern Pahari ===
- Nepali is spoken by an estimated 29,100,000 people in Nepal, 265,000 people in Bhutan, and 2,500,000 people in India. It is an official language in Nepal and India.
- Jumli is spoken by an estimated 40,000 people in the Karnali zone of Nepal.
- Doteli is spoken by an estimated 1 million people in far west Nepal.

=== Central Pahari ===
- Kumaoni is spoken by an estimated 2,360,000 people in the Kumaon region of Uttarakhand.
- Garhwali is spoken by an estimated 2,500,000 people in Uttarakhand. Most of these are Garhwali people from the Garhwal region of Uttarakhand.

=== Western Pahari ===
- Jaunsari
- Bangani
- Nuclear Himachali:
  - Hinduri
  - Pahari Kinnauri
  - Kullu Pahari
  - Mahasu Pahari
  - Sirmauri
- Mandeali
- Kangric-Chamealic-Bhattiyali:
  - Chamealic:
    - Bhadarwahi
    - Churahi
    - Bhattiyali
    - Bilaspuri
    - Chambeali
    - Gaddi
    - Pangwali
  - Kangri-Dogri:
    - Dogri
    - Kangri

== Comparison ==
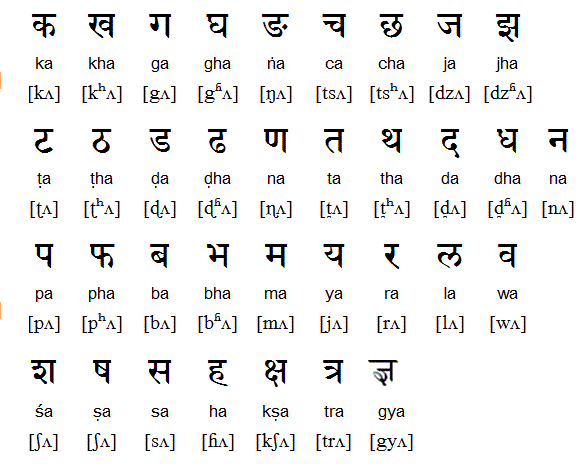
Nepali alphabets, transliteration and pronunciation

Language Comparison
	Khas-kura (Nepali)		Kumauni		Kashmiri
	Masc	Fem	Masc	Fem	Masc	Fem
I am	chhu	chhu	chik	chu	chus	ches
You are	chhas	chhes	chai	chi	chukh	chekh
He is	chha	chhe	ch	chi	chuh	cheh

In Eastern and Central Pahari the verb substantive is formed from the root ach, as in both Rajasthani and Kashmiri. In Rajasthani its present tense, being derived from the Sanskrit present rcchami, I go, does not change for gender. But in Pahari and Kashmiri it must be derived from the rare Sanskrit particle *rcchitas, gone, for in these languages it is a participial tense and does change according to the gender of the subject. Thus, in the singular we have: – Here we have a relic of the old Khasa language, which, as has been said, seems to have been related to Kashmiri. Other relics of Khasa, again agreeing with north-western India, are the tendency to shorten long vowels, the practice of epenthesis, or the modification of a vowel by the one which follows in the next syllable, and the frequent occurrence of disaspiration. Thus, Khas siknu, Kumauni sikno, but Hindi sikhna, to learn; Kumauni yeso, plural yasa, of this kind.

Materials regarding Western Pahari are not so complete. The speakers are not brought into contact with Tibeto-Burman languages, and hence we find no trace of these. But the signs of the influence of north-western languages are, as might be expected, still more apparent than farther east. In some dialects epenthesis is in full swing, as in (Churahi) khata, eating, fern, khaiti. Very interesting is the mixed origin of the postpositions defining the various cases. Thus, while that of the genitive is generally the Rajasthani ro, that of the dative continually points to the west. Sometimes it is the Sindhi khë. At other times it is jo, where is here a locative of the base of the Sindhi genitive postposition jo. In all Indo-Aryan languages, the dative postposition is by origin the locative of some genitive one. In vocabulary, Western Pahari often employs, for the more common ideas, words which can most readily be connected with the north-western and Pisaca groups.

== About ==
The Himalayas run along Nepal, India and Pakistan. The word 'Pahad' means a 'mountain' in most local languages such as Nepalese, Hindi (Parbat being a synonym) as well as Urdu (Koh being a synonym). Due to its mass prevalence and usage in the Himalayan Region, the language is also known as Himalayan. Like all other languages of the region, the Pahari languages are also from the Indo-European, and in particular Indo-Iranian branch of languages. As mountains have the tendency of isolating communities from change, dialects in the mountains tend to have their own characteristics with some similarity to others mountain dialects while remaining isolated from one another – there does seem to be a dialect continuum. All of these dialects are commonly referred to as the 'Pahari' languages, and most people from the Himalayan range are known as Paharis.
