= Bhateali =

Western Pahari language of northern India

- भटियाली
- The word "Bhateali" written in Devanagari script
- Native to: Himachal Pradesh; Punjab
- Region: Trigarta
- Native speakers: 15,347 (2011 census)
- Language family: Indo-European: Indo-Iranian; Indo-Aryan; Northern; Western Pahari; Bhateali
- Writing system: Takri, Devanagari

Language codes
- ISO 639-3: bht
- Glottolog: bhat1263

Bhateali, or Bhattiyali, is a Western Pahari language of Himachal Pradesh in northern India. It Is spoken majorily in the Bhattiyat division of Chamba, Dalhousie as well as Nurpur division of Kangra and hilly parts of Pathankot district of Punjab. The 2011 Indian Census counted 15,347 speakers, of which 15,107 were found in Chamba district of Himachal Pradesh.

Bhateali has sometimes been counted as a dialect of either Kangri. It is listed under Western Pahari languages group.

It was historically written using the Takri script.

== Phonology ==
=== Vowels ===
	Front		Central	Back	
	short	long	Central	short	long
Close	ɪ, ʏ	iː, yː	ɨ	ɯ, ʊ	uː
Close-mid		eː	ə		oː
Open-mid		æː	ə		ɔː
Open			aː		

=== Consonants ===
		Bilabial	Dental	Alveolar	Retroflex	Post-alv./ Palatal	Velar	Glottal
Nasal		m	n		ɳ		ŋ	
Stop/ Affricate	plain	p⠀b	t⠀d		ʈ⠀ɖ	tɕ⠀dʑ	k⠀ɡ	
Stop/ Affricate	aspirated	pʰ bʱ	tʰ dʱ		ʈʰ ɖʱ	tɕʰ dʑʱ	kʰ ɡʱ	
Fricative				s				h
Approximant		w	l		ɭ	j		
Trill			r		ɽ			
