= Kullui =

Western Pahari language of north India

- 𑚊𑚰𑚥𑚷𑚱𑚃 कुळूई , kuḷūī
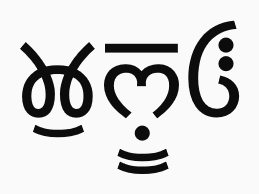
- Kuḷūī written in Takri Script
- Native to: Himachal Pradesh
- Region: Mahasu
- Native speakers: 196,295 (2011)
- Language family: Indo-European: Indo-Iranian; Indo-Aryan; Northern; Western Pahari; Kullui
- Writing system: Takri, Devanagari

Language codes
- ISO 639-3: kfx
- Glottolog: kull1236

Kullui (Kullū, also known as Kulvi, Takri: 𑚊𑚰𑚥𑚷𑚱𑚃/𑚊𑚰𑚥𑚷𑚱𑚦𑚯) is Western Pahari language spoken in the Kullu District of the Indian state of Himachal Pradesh.

== Phonology ==
=== Consonants ===
| | Bilabial | | Dental | | Alveolar | | Retroflex | | Palatal | | Velar | | Pharyngeal | Glottal |
|---|---|---|---|---|---|---|---|---|---|---|---|---|---|---|
| Plosive | p pʰ | b bʱ | t̪ t̪ʰ | d̪ d̪ʱ | | | ʈ ʈʰ | ɖ ɖʱ | | | k kʰ | ɡ ɡʱ | | ʔ |
| Affricate | | | | | t͡s t͡sʰ | d͡z d͡zʱ | | | c͡ç c͡çʰ | ɟ͡ʝ ɟ͡ʝʱ | | | | |
| Fricative | | | | | s | | | | ɕ | | | | ħ | ɦ |
| Nasal | m | | n̪ | | | | ɳ | | ɲ | | ŋ | | | |
| Trill/Flap | | | r̪ | | | | ɽ | | | | | | | |
| Lateral | | | l̪ | | | | ɭ | | | | | | | |
| Approximant | | | | | | | | | j | | | | | |

For the stops and affricates there is a four-way distinction in phonation between tenuis /p/, voiced /b/, aspirated /pʰ/ and breathy voiced /bʱ/ series. Thakur (1975, pp. 175–8) lists as separate phonemes aspirated correlates of /ŋ/, /n/, /m/, /j/, /r/, /ɽ/, /l/ and /ɭ/, but describes the aspiration as a voiceless pharyngeal friction. /n̪/ is dental, but becomes alveolar if the next syllable contains a retroflex consonant. /ŋ/ and /ɲ/ are rare, but contrast with the other nasals word-medially between vowels. /ɳ/, /ɭ/ and /ɽ/, together with their aspirated correlates, don't occur in the beginning of words. The glottal stop occurs only between a vowel and /ɳ/, /n/, /r/ or /l/, e.g. [kɑːʔɭ] "a trumpet", which contrasts with [kɑːɭ] "famine". The pharyngeal fricative /ħ/ historically derives from /s/ and occurs word-finally, e.g. [ɡʱɑːħ] "grass", [biːħ] "twenty".

== Script ==
The native script of the language is a variety of the Takri script.

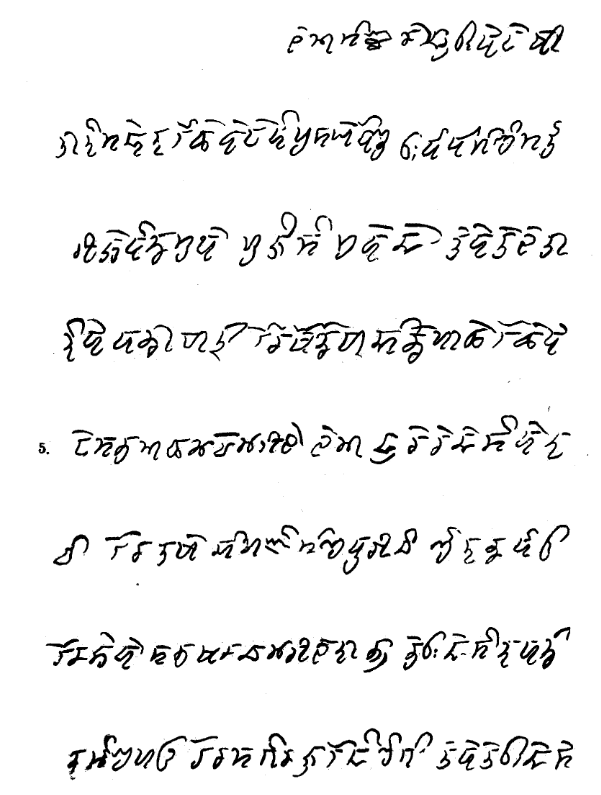
Sample text in Takri

== Status ==
The language is commonly called Pahari or Himachali. The language has no official status. According to the United Nations Education, Scientific and Cultural Organisation (UNESCO), the language is of definitely endangered category, i.e. many Kulluvi children are not learning Kulluvi as their mother tongue any longer.

== Bibliography ==
- Thakur, Mauluram (1975), Pahāṛī bhāṣā, Delhi: Sanmarg Prakashan
