= Ekadashi Mahatam =

Early Punjabi prose literary work

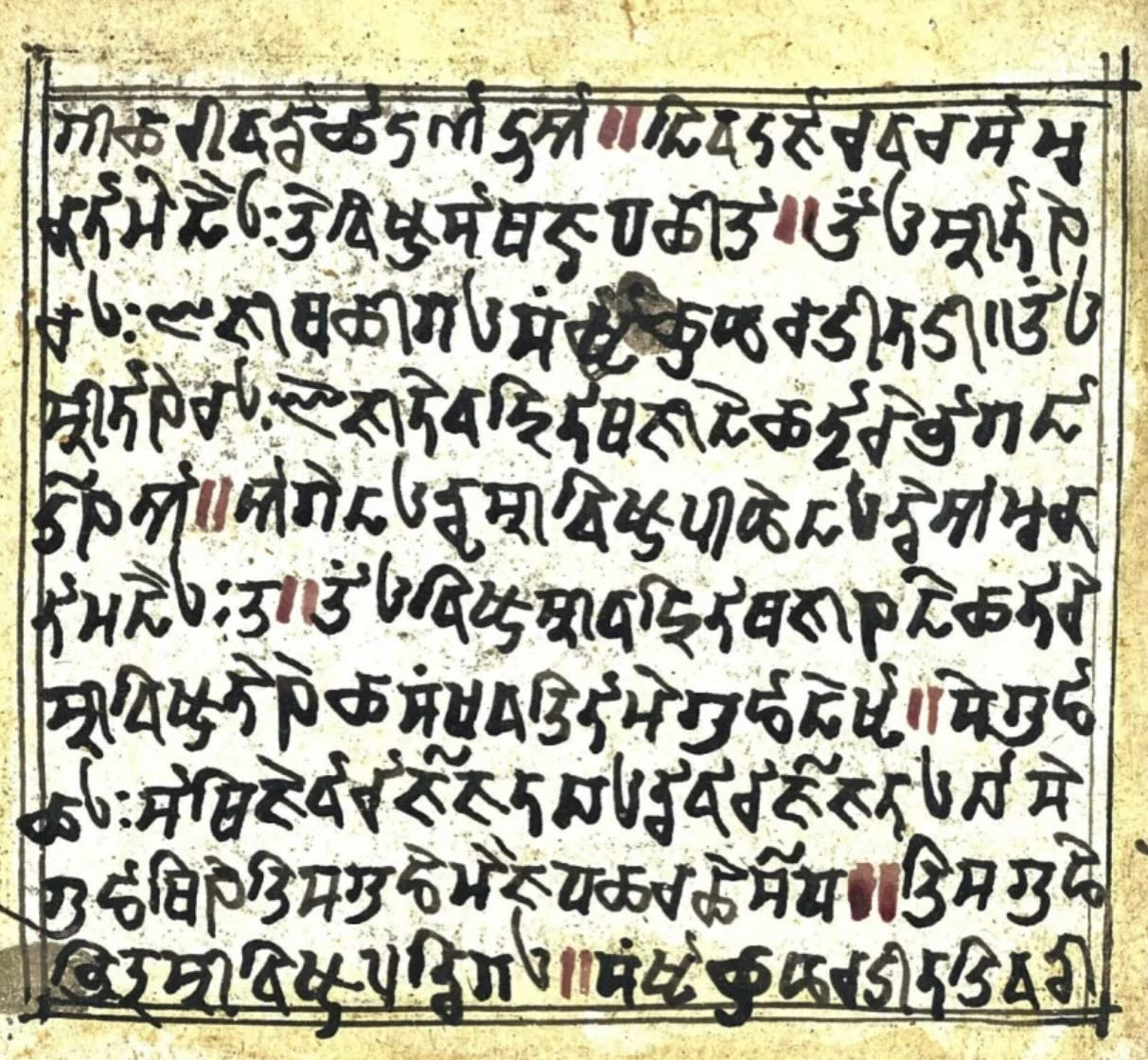
Punjabi-language manuscript of the 'Ekadashi Mahatam', c. 1200–1300

Ekadashi Mahatam is an early Old Punjabi prose work, covering the Hindu observation of Ekadashi, with the work also consisting of discourses between Arjuna and Yudhistra. The original author of the work is unknown. It is one of the few Punjabi works predating Guru Nanak. A 12th century manuscript of the work written in Devashesha script was discovered at a temple in Hoshiarpur by a Punjabi scholar, namely Tarlochan Singh of Tanda Urmar Government College, Patiala. Gottlieb William Leitner writing in 1882 noted the work was a source of indigenous study and scholarly research in early colonial Punjab. Copies of the work were produced by the Patiala Darbar, and other copies were published, including a work by Maharaj Sukhram Das Brahmachari written in 1868 and published in 1914 by Munshi Nawal Kishore, Kanpur.
