= Takri (Unicode block) =

- Range: U+11680..U+116CF (80 code points)
- Plane: SMP
- Scripts: Takri
- Major alphabets: Chambeali; Dogri
- Assigned: 68 code points
- Unused: 12 reserved code points

Unicode version history
- 6.1 (2012): 66 (+66)
- 12.0 (2019): 67 (+1)
- 14.0 (2021): 68 (+1)

Unicode documentation
- Code chart ∣ Web page

The Takri block U+11680–U+116CF was added to the Unicode Standard in January 2012 with the release of version 6.1.

== Chart ==
Takri^{[1]}^{[2]} Official Unicode Consortium code chart (PDF)
	0	1	2	3	4	5	6	7	8	9	A	B	C	D	E	F
U+1168x	𑚀	𑚁	𑚂	𑚃	𑚄	𑚅	𑚆	𑚇	𑚈	𑚉	𑚊	𑚋	𑚌	𑚍	𑚎	𑚏
U+1169x	𑚐	𑚑	𑚒	𑚓	𑚔	𑚕	𑚖	𑚗	𑚘	𑚙	𑚚	𑚛	𑚜	𑚝	𑚞	𑚟
U+116Ax	𑚠	𑚡	𑚢	𑚣	𑚤	𑚥	𑚦	𑚧	𑚨	𑚩	𑚪	𑚫	𑚬	𑚭	𑚮	𑚯
U+116Bx	𑚰	𑚱	𑚲	𑚳	𑚴	𑚵	𑚶	𑚷	𑚸	𑚹						
U+116Cx	𑛀	𑛁	𑛂	𑛃	𑛄	𑛅	𑛆	𑛇	𑛈	𑛉						
Notes: 1. As of Unicode version 16.0; 2. Grey areas indicate non-assigned code points

== History ==
The addition was made possible in part by a grant from the United States National Endowment for the Humanities, which funded the Universal Scripts Project (part of the Script Encoding Initiative at the University of California, Berkeley). The following Unicode-related documents record the purpose and process of defining specific characters in the Takri block:

Version	Final code points (Note: Proposed code points and characters names may differ from final code points and names)	Count	L2 ID	WG2 ID	Document
6.1	U+11680..116B7, 116C0..116C9	66	L2/07-419		Pandey, Anshuman (2007-12-14), Proposal to Encode the Takri Script in ISO/IEC 10646
6.1	U+11680..116B7, 116C0..116C9	66	L2/09-111		Pandey, Anshuman (2009-04-06), Proposal to Encode the Takri Script in ISO/IEC 10646
6.1	U+11680..116B7, 116C0..116C9	66	L2/09-424	N3758	Pandey, Anshuman (2009-12-31), Proposal to Encode the Takri Script in ISO/IEC 10646
6.1	U+11680..116B7, 116C0..116C9	66	L2/10-015R		Moore, Lisa (2010-02-09), "C.9", UTC #122 / L2 #219 Minutes
6.1	U+11680..116B7, 116C0..116C9	66		N3803 (pdf, doc)	"M56.09", Unconfirmed minutes of WG 2 meeting no. 56, 2010-09-24
12.0	U+116B8	1	L2/17-279	N4866	Sharma, Shriramana (2017-08-01), Proposal to encode 116B8 TAKRI LETTER ARCHAIC KHA
12.0	U+116B8	1	L2/17-255		Anderson, Deborah; Whistler, Ken; Pournader, Roozbeh; Moore, Lisa; Liang, Hai (2017-07-28), "9. Takri", Recommendations to UTC #152 July-August 2017 on Script Proposals
12.0	U+116B8	1	L2/17-222		Moore, Lisa (2017-08-11), "D.12.3", UTC #152 Minutes
12.0	U+116B8	1		N4953 (pdf, doc)	"M66.16f", Unconfirmed minutes of WG 2 meeting 66, 2018-03-23
14.0	U+116B9	1	L2/19-264		A, Srinidhi; A, Sridatta (2019-07-14), Proposal to encode the Abbreviation Sign for Takri
14.0	U+116B9	1	L2/19-343		Anderson, Deborah; Whistler, Ken; Pournader, Roozbeh; Moore, Lisa; Liang, Hai (2019-10-06), "12. Takri", Recommendations to UTC #161 October 2019 on Script Proposals
14.0	U+116B9	1	L2/19-323		Moore, Lisa (2019-10-01), "Consensus 161-C12", UTC #161 Minutes
