= Bilaspuri =

Western Pahari language of north India

- Kahluri
- 𑚠𑚮𑚥𑚭𑚨𑚞𑚱𑚤𑚯, बिलासपूरी, 𑚊𑚩𑚥𑚱𑚤𑚯, कहलूरी
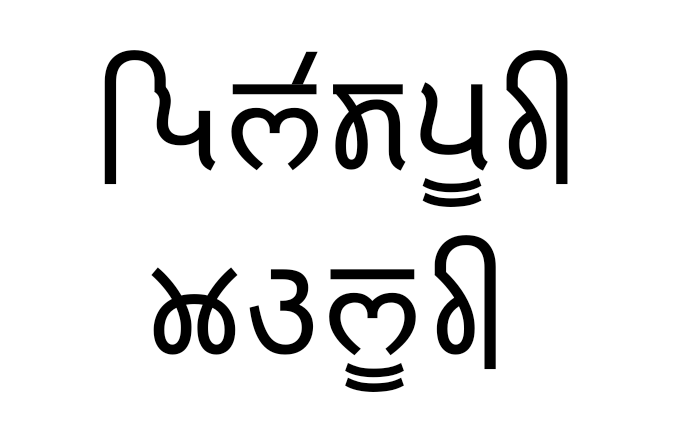
- Bilaspuri and Kahluri written in Takri Script
- Native to: Himachal Pradesh; Punjab
- Region: Trigarta
- Native speakers: 300,000 (2011)
- Language family: Indo-European: Indo-Iranian; Indo-Aryan; Northern; Western Pahari; Bilaspuri
- Writing system: Devanagari, Takri

Language codes
- ISO 639-3: kfs
- Glottolog: bila1253

Bilaspuri (Himachali Takri: 𑚠𑚮𑚥𑚭𑚨𑚞𑚱𑚤𑚯), or Kahluri (Takri:𑚊𑚩𑚥𑚱𑚤𑚯) is a Western Pahari language spoken in northern India, predominantly in the Bilaspur district of Himachal Pradesh. It is associated with the people of the former princely state of Bilaspur in the Hills State. It is also spoken in the hilly parts of Rupnagar district of Punjab.

Bilaspuri is classified as one of the varieties of the Himachali language group. According to the 2011 Census, the speakers of Bilaspuri/Kahluri (listed under Punjabi) are 295,805.

== Phonology ==
=== Vowels ===
	Front		Central	Back	
	short	long	Central	short	long
Close	ɪ, ʏ	iː, yː	ɨ	ɯ, ʊ	uː
Close-mid		eː	ə		oː
Open-mid		æː	ə		ɔː
Open			aː		

=== Consonants ===
		Bilabial	Dental	Alveolar	Retroflex	Post-alv./ Palatal	Velar	Glottal
Nasal		m	n		ɳ		ŋ	
Stop/ Affricate	plain	p⠀b	t⠀d		ʈ⠀ɖ	tɕ⠀dʑ	k⠀ɡ	
Stop/ Affricate	aspirated	pʰ bʱ	tʰ dʱ		ʈʰ ɖʱ	tɕʰ dʑʱ	kʰ ɡʱ	
Fricative				s				h
Approximant		w	l		ɭ	j		
Trill			r		ɽ			

== Dialects ==
Following are the five dialects of Bilaspuri:

1. North-east Bilaspuri: (north-east of Kumar Hati); resemblance with Mandeali and Baghliani dialect of Mahasui of Arki tehsil of Solan district.
2. North Bilaspuri: (north of Kumar Hati); resemblance with Mandeali.
3. West Bilaspuri: shares resemblance with Kangri.
4. Central Bilaspuri: Bilaspur (historic) town and surrounding area; shares resemblance with Baghliani dialect of Mahasui of Arki tehsil of Solan district.
5. Davin or Daur: east and south-east of Bilaspur (historic town) shares resemblance with Hinduri, a dialect of Keonthali sub group of Mahasui.

The dialects of Kahluri are so closely allied that one might call them one dialect Kahluri or Bilaspuri.

== Writing system ==
The native script of the language is Takri script.

== Proverbs ==
𑚊𑚩𑚥𑚱𑚤𑚯 (𑚠𑚮𑚥𑚭𑚨𑚞𑚱𑚤𑚯)	कहलूरी (बिलासपूरी)	Transliteration (Roman ITRANS)	Equivalent Idiom in English
𑚏𑚥𑚯 𑚝𑚯𑚫 𑚈𑚆 𑚀𑚞𑚱𑚫 𑚙𑚲 𑚟𑚮𑚔𑚲𑚢𑚱𑚫𑚩 𑚌𑚴𑚖𑚲𑚣𑚭𑚫𑚤𑚲	चली नीं ओए अप्पूं ते फिट्टेमूंह गोड्डेयांरे	chalI nIM oe appUM te phiTTemUMha goDDeyAMre	A bad workman quarrels with his own tools.
𑚑𑚠𑚤𑚲 𑚤𑚭 𑚞𑚙𑚶𑚚𑚤 𑚊𑚶𑚦𑚭𑚥𑚮𑚣𑚭	जबरे रा पत्थर क्वालिया	jabare rA patthara kvAliyA	Might is right.
𑚀𑚞𑚘𑚯𑚣𑚲𑚫 𑚟𑚱𑚔𑚯𑚣𑚲𑚫 𑚝𑚲𑚩𑚤𑚭	अपणीयें फूटीयें नेहरा	apaNIyeM phUTIyeM neharA	Only the wearer knows where the shoe pinches.
𑚀𑚞𑚘𑚭 𑚨𑚳 𑚀𑚞𑚘𑚭, 𑚞𑚤𑚭𑚣𑚭 𑚨𑚳 𑚞𑚤𑚭𑚣𑚭	अपणा से अपणा, पराया से पराया	apaNA se apaNA, parAyA se parAyA	Blood is thicker than water.
𑚜𑚲𑚥𑚭 𑚁𑚃 𑚑𑚭𑚫𑚛𑚭 𑚞𑚤 𑚠𑚲𑚥𑚭 𑚝𑚃𑚫 𑚉𑚫𑚛𑚭	धेला आई जांदा पर बेला नईं औंदा	dhelA AI jAMdA para belA naIM auMdA	Time once lost cannot be got back
𑚜𑚭𑚝𑚭𑚤𑚲 𑚸𑚲𑚙 𑚞𑚤𑚭𑚥𑚭 𑚙𑚲 𑚝𑚑𑚤𑚯 𑚁𑚃 𑚑𑚭𑚫𑚛𑚲/ 𑚑𑚮𑚝𑚲𑚫 𑚤𑚵𑚫𑚛𑚲𑚣𑚭𑚫 𑚑𑚭𑚘𑚭 𑚙𑚮𑚝𑚲 𑚢𑚤𑚱𑚤𑚲𑚣𑚭𑚫 𑚤𑚯 𑚃 𑚸𑚠𑚤 𑚥𑚶𑚣𑚭𑚅𑚘𑚯	धानारे खेत पराला ते नजरी आई जांदे/ जिनें रौंदेयां जाणा तिने मरूरेयां री ई खबर ल्याऊणी	dhAnAre kheta parAlA te najarI AI jAMde/ jineM rauMdeyAM jANA tine marUreyAM rI I khabara lyAUNI	Coming events cast their shadows beforehand.
𑚩𑚲𑚥 𑚠𑚲𑚠𑚲 𑚩𑚲𑚥 𑚢𑚲𑚤𑚭 𑚀𑚫𑚌𑚘 𑚙𑚲𑚤𑚯 𑚛𑚲𑚩𑚥𑚷	हेल बेबे हेल मेरा अंगण तेरी देहळ	hela bebe hela merA aMgaNa terI dehaLa	To waste time by loitering.
𑚠𑚩𑚰𑚆 𑚏𑚑𑚶𑚑𑚲-𑚏𑚭𑚤𑚲𑚫 𑚝𑚯𑚫 𑚈𑚫𑚌𑚯 𑚙𑚭𑚫 𑚌𑚥𑚶𑚥𑚲𑚫 𑚛𑚲𑚸𑚲𑚣𑚭𑚫 𑚁𑚤𑚛𑚯	बहुए चज्जे-चारें नीं ओंगी तां गल्लें देखेयां आरदी	bahue chajje-chAreM nIM oMgI tAM galleM dekheyAM AradI	If not competent in deeds, why not boast in words?
𑚜𑚯𑚆 𑚜𑚢𑚭𑚊𑚪𑚭 𑚊𑚝𑚶𑚝 𑚊𑚤 𑚠𑚩𑚰𑚆	धीए धमाकड़ा कन्न कर बहुए	dhIe dhamAka.DA kanna kara bahue	To speak to someone but to mean it for some other.
𑚑𑚮𑚨𑚤𑚲 𑚀𑚙𑚶𑚚𑚲 𑚥𑚴𑚃 𑚙𑚮𑚨𑚤𑚭 𑚨𑚠 𑚊𑚴𑚃	जिसरे अत्थे लोई तिसरा सब कोई	jisare atthe loI tisarA saba koI	One who can reward can win hearts
𑚸𑚶𑚦𑚭𑚑𑚲𑚤𑚭 𑚌𑚶𑚦𑚭' 𑚢𑚮𑚖𑚊	ख्वाजेरा ग्वाऽ मिडक	khvAjerA gvA.a miDaka	Birds of same feather flock together
𑚠𑚲𑚛𑚲 𑚁𑚃 𑚑𑚫𑚌 𑚙𑚭𑚫 𑚠𑚮𑚝 𑚊𑚰𑚪𑚮𑚣𑚲 𑚤𑚲 𑚊𑚝𑚶𑚝	बेदे आई जंग तां बिन कुड़िये रे कन्न	बेदे आई जंग तां बिन कुड़िये रे कन्न	

== Status ==
The language is commonly called Pahari or Himachali. Before independence there were certain institutions which enjoyed states patronage to publish in Kahluri. All of these institutions today lie in ruins since independence to favour Hindi. With no institute that imparts teaching for this language, the language/dialect is endangered due to dominance of other recognised languages like Hindi.

The demand for the inclusion of 'Pahari (Himachali)' under the Eight Schedule of the Constitution, which is supposed to represent multiple Pahari languages of Himachal Pradesh, had been made in the year 2010 by the state's Vidhan Sabha. There has been no positive progress on this matter since then even when small organisations are striving to save the language. The language is recorded under Western Pahari group of languages, which was done on the basis of the conclusion made by linguists.
