= Paharia language =

Paharia language may refer to:

- the Malto language of east-central India;
- the Mal Paharia language of east-central India;
- Nepali, the official language of Nepal;
- a dialect of Santali.

== See also ==
- Pahari language (disambiguation)
