= Devāśeṣa =

Brahmic script

Devasesha Devāśeṣa
- Script type: Abugida
- Period: 10th – 14th centuries CE
- Region: India, Pakistan

Related scripts
- Parent systems: Egyptian: Proto-Sinaitic; Phoenician; Aramaic (debated); Brahmi; Gupta; Sharada; Devasesha
- Child systems: Takri; Gurmukhi?

Devasesha (Devāśeṣa) is the term for a late-stage of Sharada script, being a degenerated form of Sharada. Devadesha was the intermediary script between Sharada and Takri scripts. As per Tarlochan Singh Bedi, the Gurmukhi script was devised from the Devasesha script. A surviving work written in the script is a 12th century manuscript of the Ekadashi Mahatam discovered in Hoshiarpur.

== Development ==
Sharada script can be divided into two, broad paleographical periods: 'Sharada proper' and 'modern Sharada'. Usage of Sharada proper came to an end by the start of the 13th century. From that point onward, the modern Sharada continued to evolve and from it arose other scripts, such as Takri, Landa, and Gurmukhi. By the 15th century, Sharada had shifted substantially from the pre-Islamic period, leading to a new term to denote this stage of development of the script: Devāśeṣa. The Devāśeṣa stage lasted from the 14–18th centuries in Himachal Pradesh (specifically Chamba and the surrounding hill tracts), whilst other sources give an earlier dating of the stage to the 10th and 14th centuries. Inscriptions sourced from Chamba written in Devāśeṣa are dated to between the 10th to 12th centuries. Takri arose from Devāśeṣa in around 1350 in the Pahari Hills. Bedi believes Devasesha is the script that Gurmukhi arose from, which he terms Pritham Gurmukhi or Proto-Gurmukhi. However, there are alternative theories on Gurmukhi's origins, such as it being an adapted form of a Landa or Takri script used by mercantile and scribal communities of northwest India.

=== Timeline ===
A timeline is as follows (with exact dates or time periods for the emergence and disappearance of particular scripts being contested in academia): Brahmi (300 BCE to 300 CE) → Western Gupta (4th – 6th century CE) → Kutila (7th to 9th century CE) → Śāradā (9th to 11th centuries) → Devāśeṣa (11th to 13th centuries)
