= Takri script =

Writing system for some Indic languages

Takri 𑚔𑚭𑚊𑚤𑚯
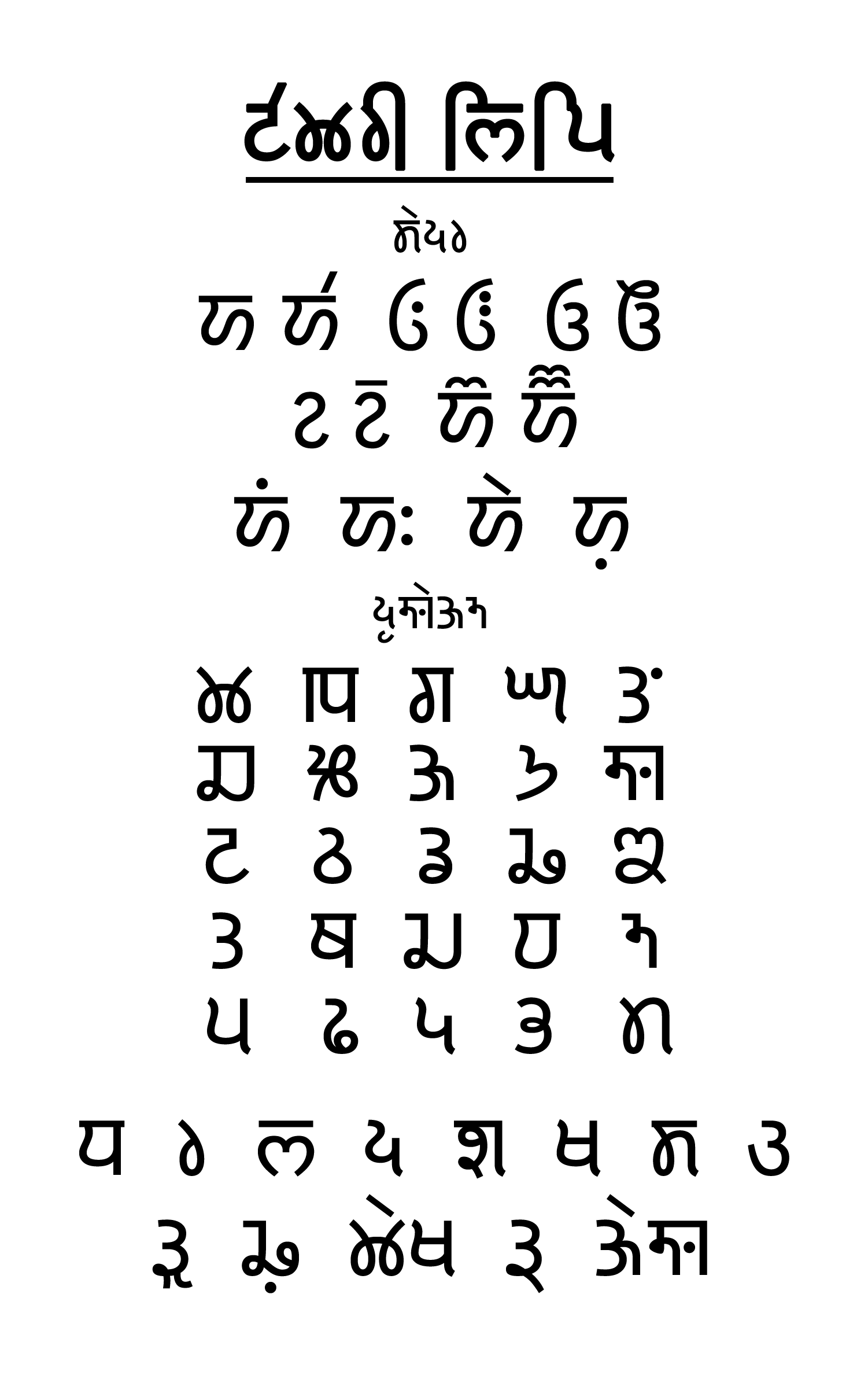
- Standardised Takri Alphabet Chart in the Chamba Takri variety
- Script type: Abugida
- Period: c. 16th century CE to present
- Direction: Left-to-right
- Region: India, Pakistan
- Languages: Dogri, Kangri, Chambeali, Mandeali, Bilaspuri, Kullui, Bhateali, Churahi, Kishtwari, Gaddi, Mahasui, Sirmauri, Pangwali, Bhadarwahi, Sanskrit

Related scripts
- Parent systems: Egyptian: Proto-Sinaitic; Phoenician; Aramaic (debated); Brahmi; Gupta; Sharada; Devashesha-Tankri; Takri
- Child systems: Dogri
- Sister systems: Landa

ISO 15924
- ISO 15924: Takr (321), Takri, Ṭākrī, Ṭāṅkrī

Unicode
- Unicode alias: Takri
- Unicode range: U+11680–U+116CF

Inscriptions engraved on wooden beam on celling of a structure in village Shiladesh of Chirgaon, Shimla

The Tākri script (Takri (Chamba): 𑚔𑚭𑚊𑚤𑚯; Takri (Jammu/Dogra): 𑠔𑠬𑠊𑠤𑠮; sometimes called Tankri 𑚔𑚭𑚫𑚊𑚤𑚯) is an abugida writing system of the Brahmic family of scripts. It is derived from the Sharada script, the ancient script used for Kashmiri. It is the sister script of Laṇḍā scripts. It has another variant Dogra Takri (also known as Dogra Akkhar) employed in the Jammu region. There are numerous varieties present throughout Himachal Pradesh. Until the late 1940s, the adapted version of the script (called Dogri, Dogra or Dogra Akkhar) was the official script for writing Dogri in the princely state of Jammu and Kashmir. Throughout history, the different kingdoms of what now forms Himachal Pradesh used their own variety to maintain their records. The Takri script used in Sirmour in Himachal Pradesh and in the adjacent region of Jaunsar-Bawar in Uttarakhand has some distinction.

== History ==
The Takri alphabet developed through the Devāśeṣa stage of the Sharada script from the 14th-18th centuries and was found mainly in the Hill States such as Chamba and surrounding areas. The local Takri variants got the status of official scripts in some of the Punjab Hill States, and were used for both administrative and literary purposes until the 19th century. After 1948, when Himachal Pradesh was established as an administrative unit, the local Takri variants were replaced by Devanagari.

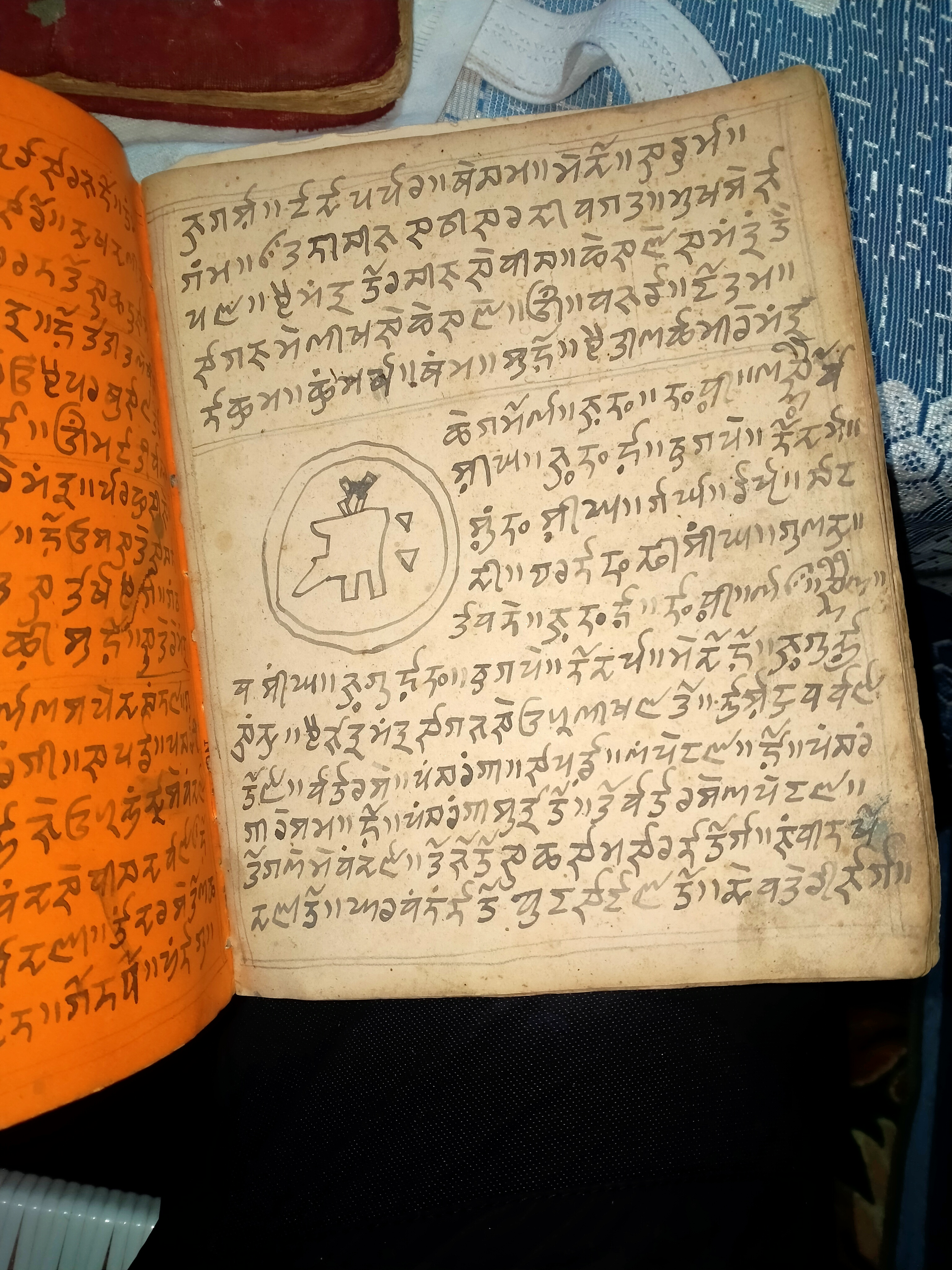
Book written in tankri script signifying certain matras used for ritual proposes

Takri itself has historically been used to write a number of Western Pahari Languages in the Western Himalaya, such as Gaddi or Gaddki (the language of the Gaddi ethnic group), Kishtwari spoken in the Kishtwar region of Jammu) and Chambeali (the language of the Chamba region of Himachal Pradesh). Takri used to be most prevalent script for business records and communication in various parts of Himachal Pradesh including the regions of Kangra and Bilaspur. The shift to Devanagari can be traced to the early days of Indian independence (1950s−80s).

== Revival movement ==
Since Takri fell into disuse, there have been sporadic attempts to revive the script in Himachal Pradesh. Recent efforts have been made to teach the script to Himachali Paharis.

The Takri (Tankri) script was also used in cinema. The first film in Pahari called Saanjh directed by Ajay K Saklani released in April 2017 used Takri script in its title and beginning credits. Workshops are being conducted in small scale in the state of Himachal Pradesh, in districts like Chamba and Kullu, Kangra and Shimla. An organisation named Sambh (Devanagari: सांभ) based at Dharamshala has decided to develop fonts for this script.

A Pahari Corridor from Shimla to Murree has also been proposed under the Aman ki Asha initiative to link the similar Western Pahari language-based regions of Himachal Pradesh, Jammu, Azad Kashmir and Pothohar Plateau and revive the script.

The Himachal Pradesh government under the National Manuscript Mission Yojana has set up a Manuscript Resource Centre and so far 1.26 lakh (1,26,000) manuscripts, including those in Takri, have been catalogued and has decided to be digitised.

== Varieties ==
The word 'Takri' written in Chamba Takri

There are several regional varieties of Takri, with each Hill State/District or tract having its own style. There is considerable variation in the spellings of the names of the regional forms and the languages they represent. The names of languages have also changed, so that the names used in Grierson and other sources differ from current practices. In order to assist in the identification of languages and the forms of Takri associated with them, the language names below are denoted using ISO639-3 codes. Specimens of Takri representative of the regional form is also indicated.

- Bhattiyali [bht]: Bhateali, Bhatiali
- Chambeali [cdh]: Chambiali, Chameali, Chamiali
- Dogra [dgo], [doi]: Dogri
- Gaddi [gbk]: Bharmauri, Gadi
- Gahri [bfu]: Bunan
- Jaunsari [jns]
- Kangri [xnr]: Kangri
- Kinnauri [kjo]: Kanauri
- Kishtwari [kas]: Kashtwari
- Kulvi [kfx]: Kullu, Kului, Kullvi
- Mahasu [bfz]: Kochi, Kiunthali
- Mandeali [mjl]: Himachali, Mandi
- Sirmauri [srx]

The Chambeali version was selected to be the standard for the Unicode.

A variety of Takri which was used for Sirmauri and Jaunsari has been proposed to be encoded in the Unicode.

== Letters ==
Consonants
𑚊 ka	𑚋 kha	𑚌 ga	𑚍 gha	𑚎 ṅa
𑚏 ca	𑚐 cha	𑚑 ja	𑚒 jha	𑚓 ña
𑚔 ṭa	𑚕 ṭha	𑚖 ḍa	𑚗 ḍha	𑚘 ṇa
𑚙 ta	𑚚 tha	𑚛 da	𑚜 dha	𑚝 na
𑚞 pa	𑚟 pha	𑚠 ba	𑚡 bha	𑚢 ma
𑚣 ya	𑚤 ra	𑚥 la	𑚦 va	
𑚧 śa	𑚋 ṣa	𑚨 sa	𑚩 ha	𑚪 ṛa

Archaic consonant
𑚸
kha

Vowels
Vowel	a	ā	i	ī	u	ū
Independent	𑚀	𑚁	𑚂	𑚃	𑚄	𑚅
Dependent		𑚭	𑚮	𑚯	𑚰	𑚱

Vowel	e	ai	o	au
Independent	𑚆	𑚇	𑚈	𑚉
Dependent	𑚲	𑚳	𑚴	𑚵

Signs
𑚫 ṁ	𑚬 ḥ	𑚶 virama	𑚷 nuqta	𑚹 abbr. sign

Digits
𑛀 0	𑛁 1	𑛂 2	𑛃 3	𑛄 4	𑛅 5	𑛆 6	𑛇 7	𑛈 8	𑛉 9

== In Unicode ==
Takri script was added to the Unicode Standard in 2012 (version 6.1).

Takri^{[1]}^{[2]} Official Unicode Consortium code chart (PDF)
	0	1	2	3	4	5	6	7	8	9	A	B	C	D	E	F
U+1168x	𑚀	𑚁	𑚂	𑚃	𑚄	𑚅	𑚆	𑚇	𑚈	𑚉	𑚊	𑚋	𑚌	𑚍	𑚎	𑚏
U+1169x	𑚐	𑚑	𑚒	𑚓	𑚔	𑚕	𑚖	𑚗	𑚘	𑚙	𑚚	𑚛	𑚜	𑚝	𑚞	𑚟
U+116Ax	𑚠	𑚡	𑚢	𑚣	𑚤	𑚥	𑚦	𑚧	𑚨	𑚩	𑚪	𑚫	𑚬	𑚭	𑚮	𑚯
U+116Bx	𑚰	𑚱	𑚲	𑚳	𑚴	𑚵	𑚶	𑚷	𑚸	𑚹						
U+116Cx	𑛀	𑛁	𑛂	𑛃	𑛄	𑛅	𑛆	𑛇	𑛈	𑛉						
Notes 1.As of Unicode version 18.0 2.Grey areas indicate non-assigned code points

== Gallery ==
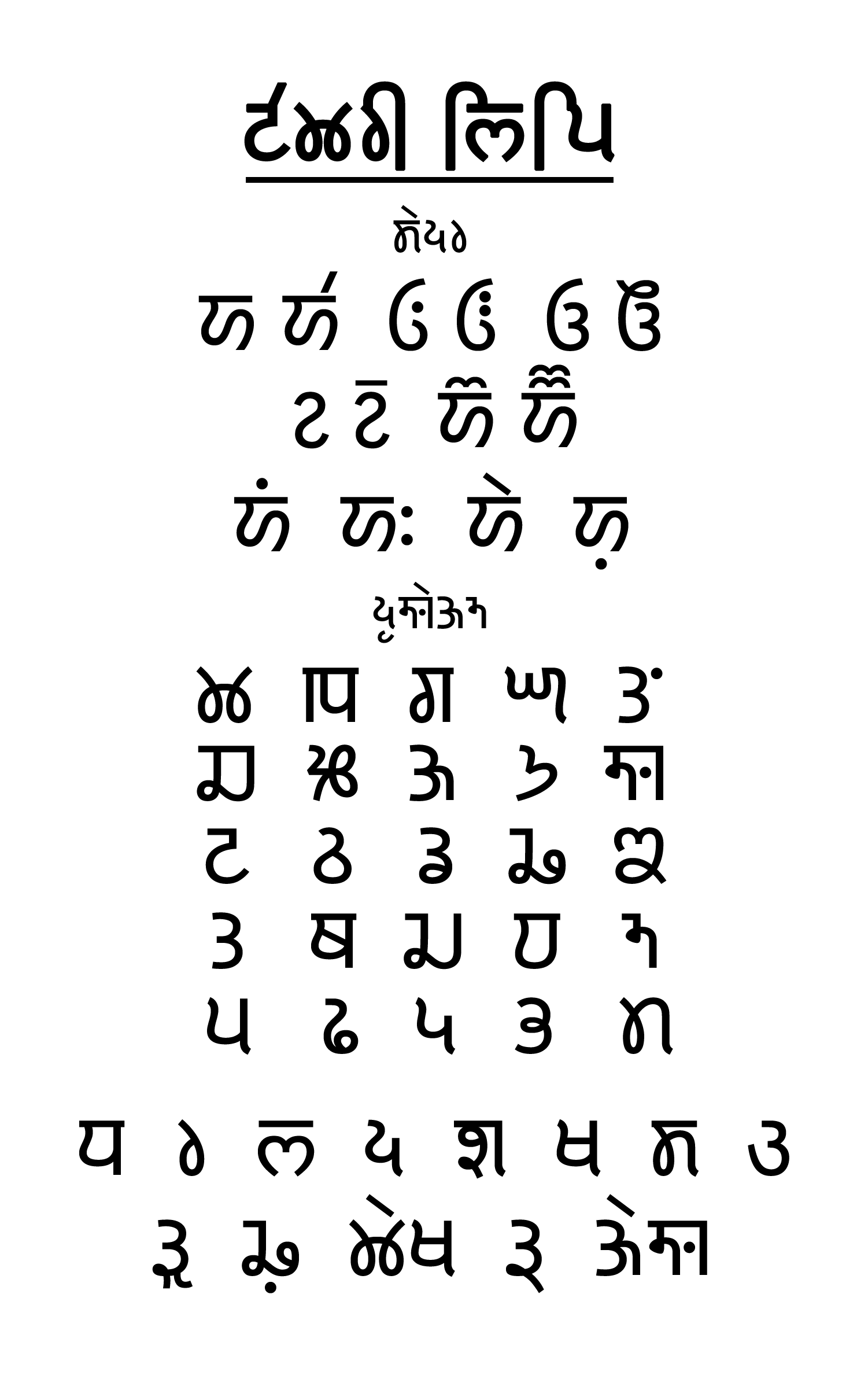
Standardised Takri Varnamala in Chamba style

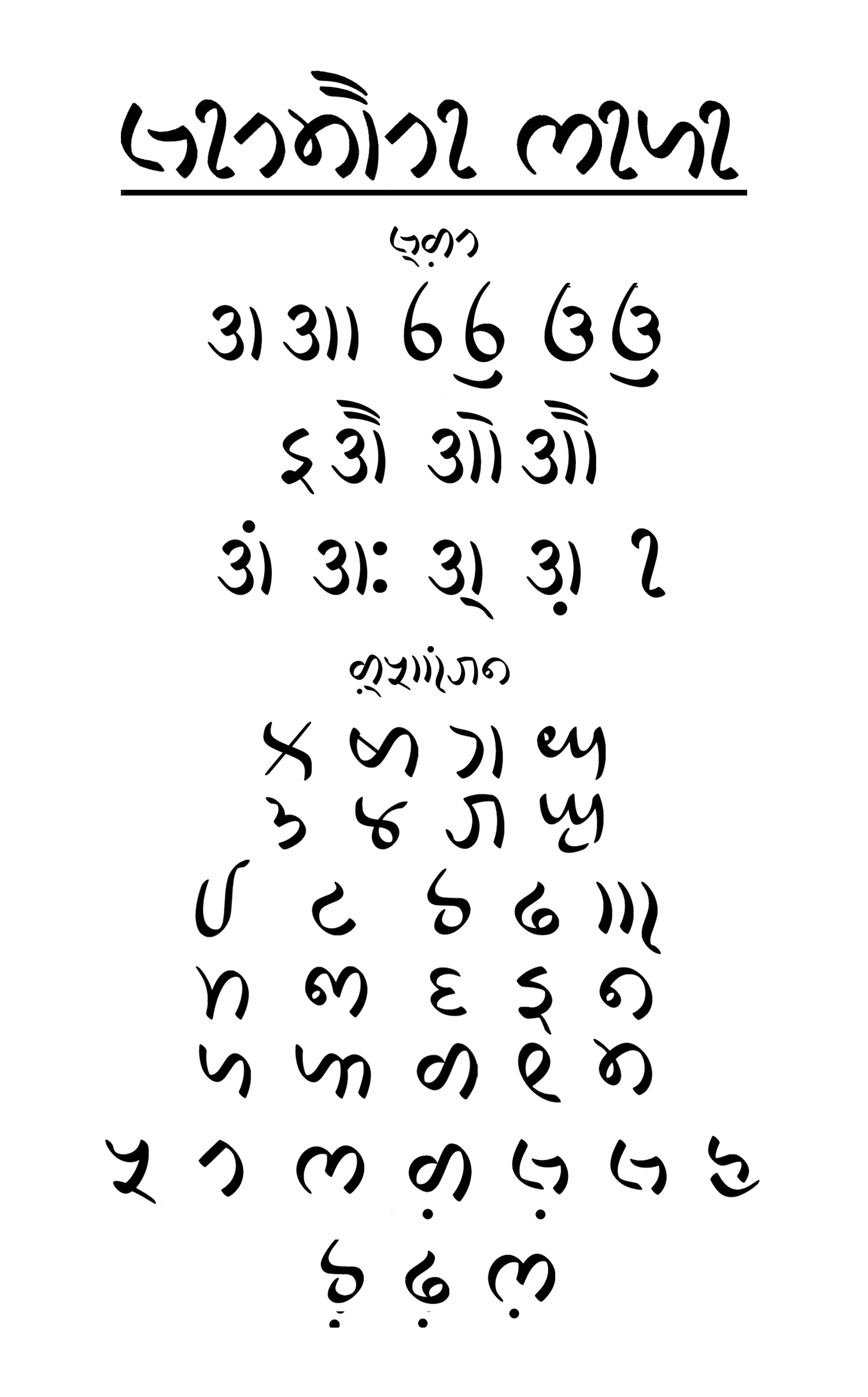
Takri Varnamala in Sirmauri style

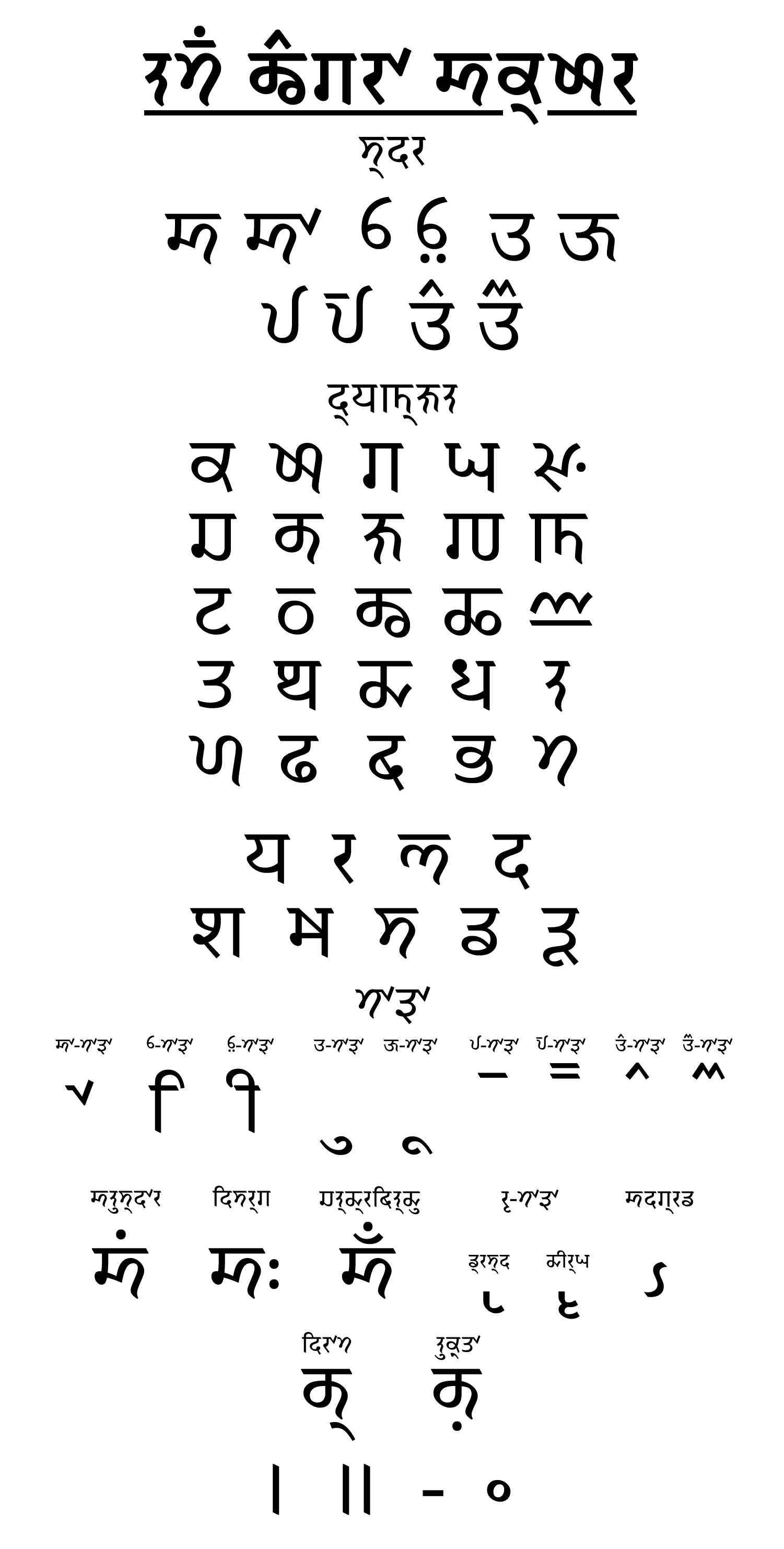
Dogri Varnamala

== External resources ==
- Takri at Aksharamukha
- Takri at Omniglot
- Comparative examples of Takri and related scripts (Spanish language website)
- A discussion of the Gaddi, with a reference to Takri
- Information about ancient Takri script on YouTube
- Efforts to sustain Takri script on YouTube
