= Gaddi language =

Western Pahari language of north India

Gaddi
- 𑚌𑚛𑚯, गदी Gaddi 𑚌𑚛𑚊𑚯, गदकी Gaddki 𑚌𑚛𑚮𑚣𑚭𑚥𑚯, गदियाली Gaddiyali 𑚡𑚤𑚢𑚵𑚪𑚯, भरमौड़ी Bharmauri
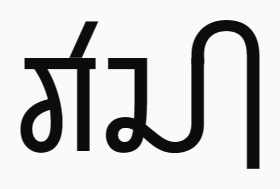
- The word "Gaddi" written in Takri script
- Native to: Himachal Pradesh
- Region: Trigarta
- Ethnicity: Gaddis
- Native speakers: 181,000 (2011)
- Language family: Indo-European: Indo-Iranian; Indo-Aryan; Northern; Western Pahari; Gaddi
- Writing system: Takri, Devanagari

Language codes
- ISO 639-3: gbk
- Glottolog: gadd1242
- ELP: Gaddi

Gaddi (also called Gaddki, Gaddiyali or Bharmauri; Takri: 𑚌𑚛𑚯, 𑚌𑚛𑚊𑚯, 𑚌𑚛𑚮𑚣𑚭𑚥𑚯, 𑚡𑚤𑚢𑚵𑚪𑚯) is an Indo-Aryan language of India. It is spoken by the Gaddi people primarily residing in the Bharmour region of Chamba district and the upper reaches of Kangra district in Himachal Pradesh. It is also spoken in neighbouring parts of Jammu, with Gaddi villages found in Udhampur, Kathua and Doda districts.

The language has traditionally been written using the Takri script.

Interview of Tarsem Jaryal about Gaddi culture in Gaddi language. Part -1

== Phonology ==
=== Vowels ===
	Front		Central	Back	
	short	long	Central	short	long
Close	ɪ, ʏ	iː, yː	ɨ	ɯ, ʊ	uː
Close-mid		eː	ə		oː
Open-mid		æː	ə		ɔː
Open			aː		

=== Consonants ===
		Bilabial	Dental	Alveolar	Retroflex	Post-alv./ Palatal	Velar	Glottal
Nasal		m	n		ɳ		ŋ	
Stop/ Affricate	plain	p⠀b	t⠀d		ʈ⠀ɖ	tɕ⠀dʑ	k⠀ɡ	
Stop/ Affricate	aspirated	pʰ bʱ	tʰ dʱ		ʈʰ ɖʱ	tɕʰ dʑʱ	kʰ ɡʱ	
Fricative				s				h
Approximant		w	l		ɭ	j		
Trill			r		ɽ			

== Dialects ==
There are four dialects of the language:

- The first one is spoken in the entire Bharmaur, Chhatrari and Bhatyat Tehsils of Chamba and Gaddi speaking regions of Kangra district.
- The second one is spoken in consists of Piyuhar, Belaj, Guun, Bakani, the upper part of Mehla and Kaded, etc.
- The third one is spoken in the region of Basu and other adjoining area.
- The fourth one is spoken in Lilh and Paho.

== Status ==
The language is commonly called Pahari or Himachali. Some speakers may even call it a dialect of Dogri. The language has no official status. According to the United Nations Education, Scientific and Cultural Organisation (UNESCO), the language is definitely endangered category, i.e. many Gaddi chilanother adjoining areag Gaddi as their mother tongue any longer.

The demand for the inclusion of 'Pahari (Himachali)' under the Eight Schedule of the Constitution, which is supposed to represent multiple Pahari languages of Himachal Pradesh, had been made in the year 2010 by the state's Vidhan Sabha. There has been no positive progress on this matter since then even when small organisations are striving to save the language.
