= Chambeali =

Western Pahari language of Himachal Pradesh

- चम्बयाली cambayālī
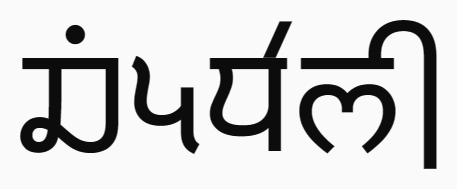
- The word "Chambeali" written in Takri script
- Native to: Himachal Pradesh
- Region: Trigarta
- Native speakers: 126,000 (2011)
- Language family: Indo-European: Indo-Iranian; Indo-Aryan; Northern; Western Pahari; Chambeali
- Dialects: Bansyari; Bansbari; Gadi Chameali
- Writing system: Takri

Language codes
- ISO 639-3: cdh
- Glottolog: cham1307
- ELP: Chambeali

Chambeali (Takri: 𑚏𑚢𑚶𑚠𑚣𑚭𑚥𑚯) is an Indo-Aryan language of the Western Pahari group spoken in the Chamba district of Himachal Pradesh, India.

== Phonology ==
=== Vowels ===
	Front		Central	Back	
	short	long	Central	short	long
Close	ɪ, ʏ	iː, yː	ɨ	ɯ, ʊ	uː
Close-mid		eː	ə		oː
Open-mid		æː	ə		ɔː
Open			aː		

=== Consonants ===
		Bilabial	Dental	Alveolar	Retroflex	Post-alv./ Palatal	Velar	Glottal
Nasal		m	n		ɳ		ŋ	
Stop/ Affricate	plain	p⠀b	t⠀d		ʈ⠀ɖ	tɕ⠀dʑ	k⠀ɡ	
Stop/ Affricate	aspirated	pʰ bʱ	tʰ dʱ		ʈʰ ɖʱ	tɕʰ dʑʱ	kʰ ɡʱ	
Fricative				s				h
Approximant		w	l		ɭ	j		
Trill			r		ɽ			

== Classification ==
The Chambeali language is a part of the North-Western branch of the Indo-Aryan languages. It is further classified as a member of Western Pahari. The language has a high degree of mutual intelligibility with neighbouring Pahari languages like Mandeali (83%).

== Geographic distribution ==
=== Official status ===
The language is commonly called Pahari or Himachali. The language has no official status and is recorded as dialect of Hindi. According to the United Nations Education, Scientific and Cultural Organisation (UNESCO), the language is of definitely endangered category, i.e. many Chambeali children are not learning Chambeali as their mother tongue any longer. Earlier the language got huge amount of state patronage. Everything changed since independence, due to favoritism towards Hindi by the Indian Government.

The demand for the inclusion of 'Pahari (Himachali)' under the Eight Schedule of the Constitution, which is supposed to represent multiple Pahari languages of Himachal Pradesh, had been made in the year 2010 by the state's Vidhan Sabha. There has been no positive progress on this matter since then even when small organisations are striving to save the language. Due to political interest, the language is currently recorded as a dialect of Hindi, even when having a poor mutual intelligibility with it and having a higher mutual intelligibility with other recognised languages like Dogri.

=== Dialects ===
There are three dialects of the language as follows:

1. Bansyari
2. Bansbari
3. Gadi Chambeali

== Writing system ==
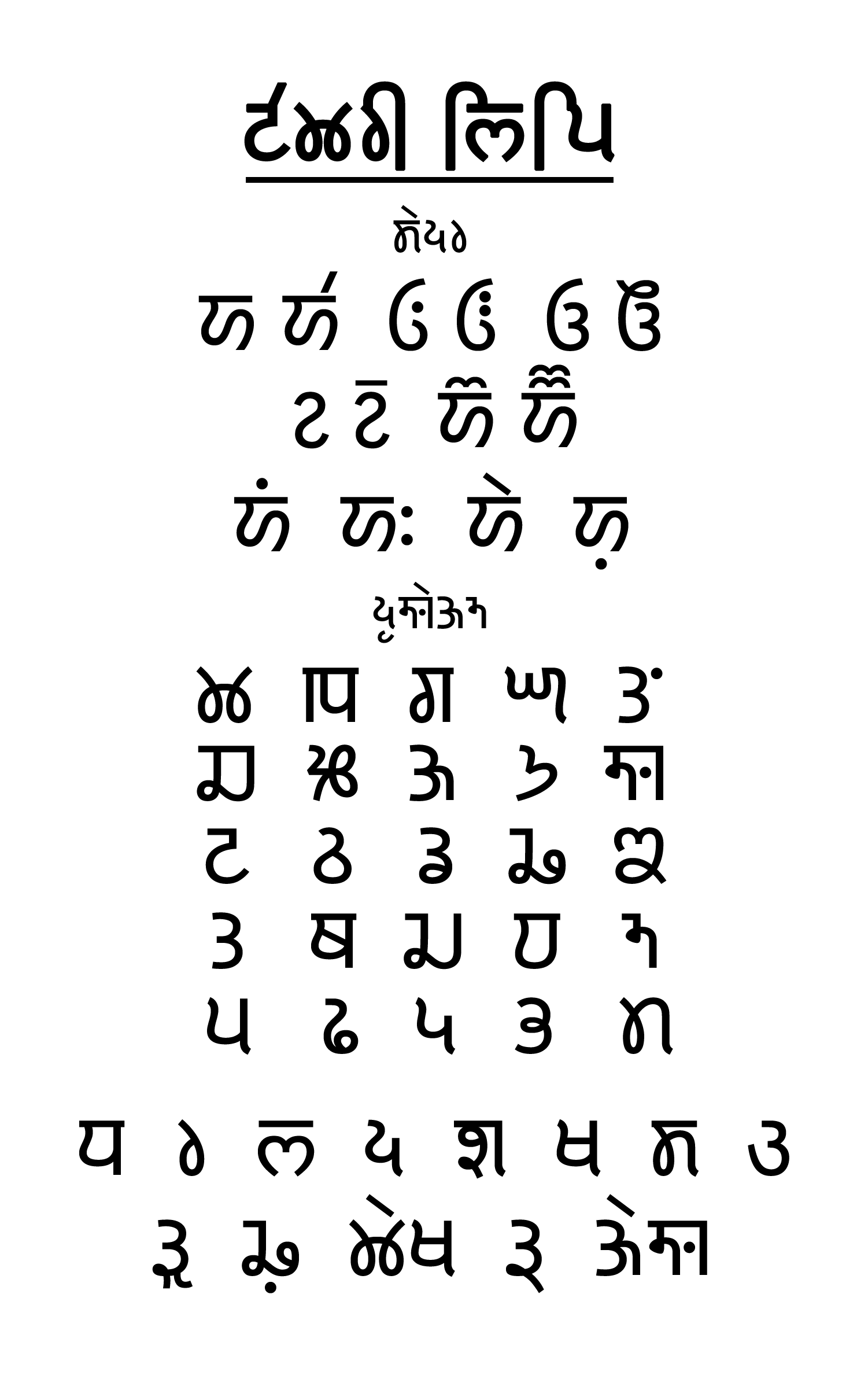
Chambeali Takri Varnamala

The native script of the language is Takri script. The Chambeali version of Takri script has been encoded as the standard for Takri script under Unicode. This version resembles other version of the script.

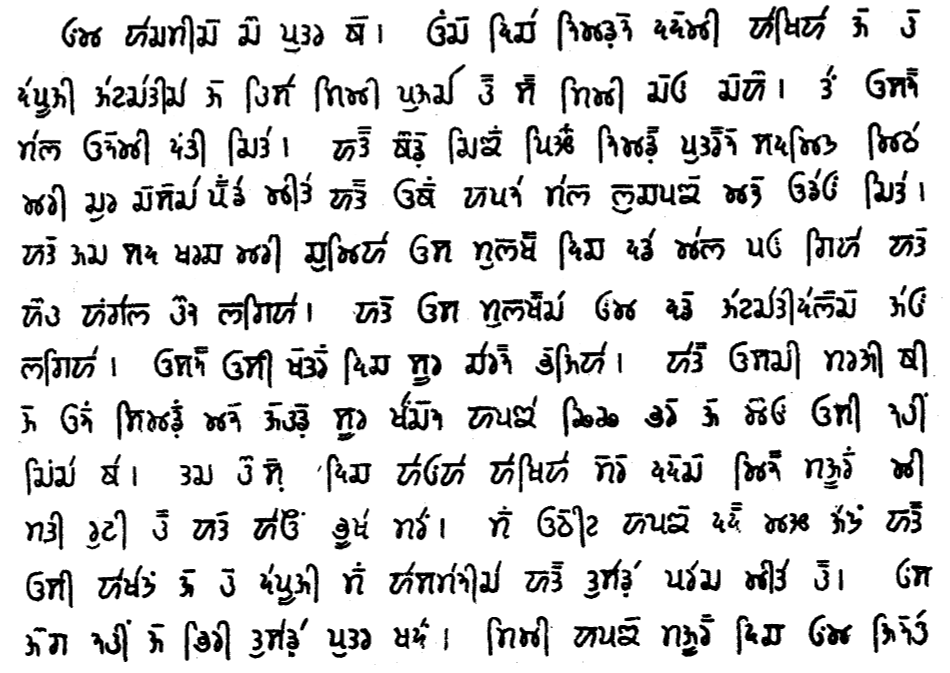
Specimen in Chambyali Takri

== Vocabulary ==
=== Name of months ===
Traditionally, the month formats is based on Hindu calendar.

List of Months in Chambeali
𑚏𑚢𑚶𑚠𑚣𑚭𑚥𑚯	चम्बयाली	Transliteration (ITRANS)	English
𑚏𑚳𑚙𑚤	चैतर	chaitara	March–April
𑚠𑚨𑚭𑚸	बसाख	basAkha	April–May
𑚑𑚳𑚕	जैठ	jaiTha	May–June
𑚩𑚭𑚖	हाड	hADa	June–July
𑚨𑚵𑚘	सौण	sauNa	July–August
𑚡𑚭𑚛𑚶𑚤𑚴	भाद्रो	bhAdro	August–September
𑚨𑚱𑚑	सूज	sUja	September–October
𑚊𑚭𑚙𑚮	काति	kAti	October–November
𑚢𑚍𑚳𑚤	मघैर	maghaira	November–December
𑚞𑚴𑚩	पोह	poha	December–January
𑚢𑚭𑚍	माघ	mAgha	January–February
𑚟𑚵𑚌𑚘	फौगण	phaugaNa	February–March
