= Western Pahari =

Language family of North India

- Pahari, Himachali
- Geographic distribution: North India
- Linguistic classification: Indo-European: Indo-Iranian; Indo-Aryan; Northern Indo-Aryan; Western Pahari

Language codes
- ISO 639-2 / 5: him
- Glottolog: hima1250

The Western Pahari or Himachali languages are a range of languages and dialects of Northern Indo-Aryan languages spoken in the western parts of the Himalayan range, primarily in the Indian state of Himachal Pradesh.

Western Pahari languages are also spoken in other neighbouring Indian areas like hilly parts of Punjab and Haryana, in Jaunsar-Bawar of Dehradun district and in western parts of Uttarkashi district in Uttarakhand, and in the Chenab Valley of the Jammu division of Jammu and Kashmir.

Western Pahari Language Day is celebrated on February 21 each year in the memory of Narain Chand Prashar, who is considered as the father of the Western Pahari, died on this day in 2001, which co-incidentally celebrated on the same day as the International Mother Language Day.

== Languages ==
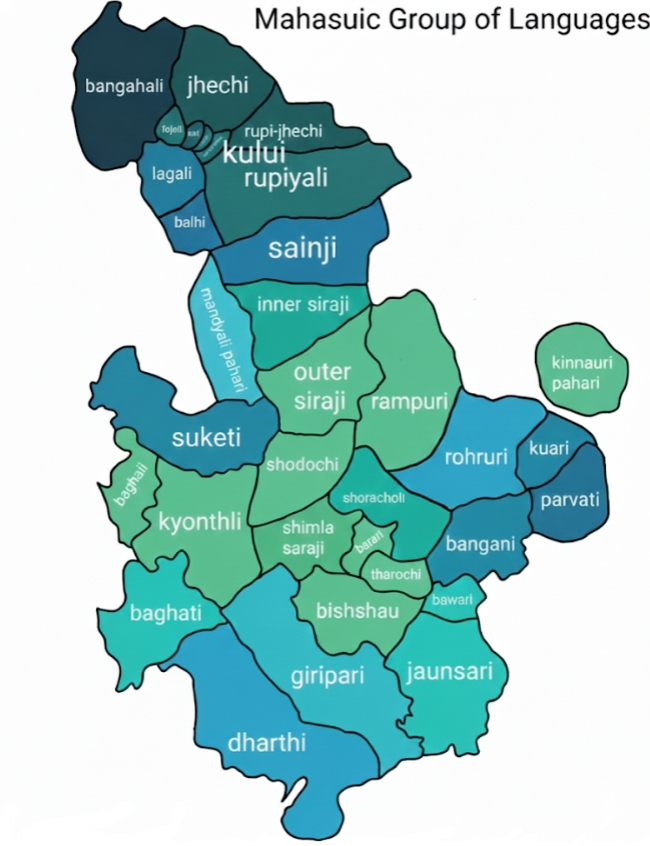
Map of Mahasuic group of languages also known as Nuclear Himachali languages

The following lists the languages classified as belonging to Western Pahari, with the provisional grouping used in Glottolog 5.3:

- Jaunsari
- Mandeali
- Nuclear Himachali (Mahasuic)
  - Hinduri
  - Pahari Kinnauri
  - Sirmauri
  - Mahasu Pahari
  - Kullu Pahari
- Kangric-Chamealic-Bhadarwahic
  - Kangri-Dogri
    - Dogri
    - Kangri
  - Chamealic
    - Chambeali
    - Bilaspuri
    - Bhattiyali
    - Gaddi
    - Pangwali
  - Bhadarwahic-Curahi
    - Churahi
    - Bhadarwahic
      - Bhadarwahi
      - Chinali–Lahul languages
        - Chinali
        - Lahul Lohar

The Chinali–Lahul languages have only recently been recognized as part of the family.

Some Western Pahari languages, notably Dogri and Kangri, are tonal.Unlike most other pahari languages, Dogri has been an official language in India since 2003.

Claus Peter Zoller, suggests that the Bangani language is closely related to (or belongs to) the Western Pahari languages.

== Status ==
According to the United Nations Education, Scientific and Cultural Organisation (UNESCO), all of Western Pahari languages, except for Dogri, are under either definitely endangered or critically endangered category. None of these languages, except for Dogri, have any official status.

The demand for the inclusion of 'Pahari (Himachali)' under the Eight Schedule of the Constitution, which is supposed to represent multiple Pahari languages of Himachal Pradesh, had been made in the year 2010 by the state's Vidhan Sabha. There has been no positive progress on this matter since then even when small organisations are striving to save the language. Due to political interest, the language is currently recorded as a dialect of Hindi, even when having a poor mutual intelligibility with it and having a higher mutual intelligibility with other recognised languages like Dogri.

In October 2021 a PIL was also filed in the Himachal Pradesh High Court which re-ignited the quest for recognizing Pahari (Himachali) or Western Pahari dialect chain spoken in Himachal as one of official languages of Himachal Pradesh.The petitioners through the PIL also requested the court to direct the State government to promote Pahari (Himachali) and other local languages as the medium of instruction in primary and middle-level schools as per the National Education Policy, 2020. As well as also prayed that the court direct the state government to include Pahari (Himachali) language as a separate category for the 2021 census of India and simultaneously undertake an awareness campaign to create awareness amongst the masses, especially the youth of the State who speak Pahari (Himachali), to get it marked as their mother tongue in the upcoming Census. A bench of Chief Justice Mohammad Rafiq and Justice Sabina while disposing off the PIL stated,“The direction as has been prayed for, cannot be issued to the State Government until and unless it is established on record that the Pahari (Himachali) language has its own script and that a common Pahari dialect is spoken throughout the State of Himachal Pradesh. We, however, set the petitioner at liberty to approach the Department of Language Art & Culture to the Government of Himachal Pradesh with his demand for undertaking research to promote a common Pahari (Himachali) nuclear language structure and nuclear Tankri script. If the petitioner approaches the respondents-State through its Additional Chief Secretary (Language Art & Culture) to the Government of Himachal Pradesh) for the prayer made in the Civil Writ Public Interest Litigation, it would be for the said authority to consider the same in accordance with the law.” Additionally, the petition had emphasised that Sanskrit, which is the second official language of the state, had only 936 speakers according to the 2011 census and Pahari (Himachali) dialect chain which is spoken by more than 40 lakh people was being neglected and has not been made an official language even after having so many speakers.

== Bibliography ==
- Masica, Colin P. (1991). The Indo-Aryan languages. Cambridge language surveys. Cambridge University Press. ISBN 978-0-521-23420-7.
