= Pahari language =

Ambiguous term referring to Himalayan languages and dialects

Pahari, or Pahadi (पहाड़ी پہاڑی pahāṛī 'of the hills/mountains'; English: /pəˈhɑːri/), is an encompassing term that has been used for a variety of languages, dialects and language groups, most of which are found in the lower Himalayas.

Most commonly, it refers to:

- Pahari-Poonchi, is language spoken in Poonch division of Azad Kashmir, Pakistan and Jammu and Kashmir, India
- Pahari-Pothwari, is a Lahnda dialect group within the Punjabi group spoken in Pakistan's northern Punjab, Pakistani Kashmir and Jammu and Kashmir.
- Western Pahari languages, group of languages spoken primarily in the Indian state of Himachal Pradesh, with some languages in the south-eastern parts of Indian Jammu and Kashmir, eastern parts of Uttarakhand and some hilly parts of Haryana.
- Northern Indo-Aryan languages, in the linguistics literature often referred to as "Pahari languages", a proposed group that includes the Indo-Aryan languages of Nepal and the Indian states of Uttarakhand and Himachal Pradesh.

Less commonly, Pahari may be:

- a term used by Dogri speakers of the plains to refer to the Dogri varieties spoken at higher elevations, in Indian Jammu and Kashmir,
- a local name for a variety of Bilaspuri spoken in a certain hilly area of Indian Punjab,
- a name nowadays used only in rural areas to refer to the Nepali language,
- a local name for a Bhili dialect of Eastern Gujarat.

Pahari (पहरी Paharī) refers to:

- Pahari language (Sino-Tibetan), a Tibeto-Burman language spoken by a few thousand people in central Nepal.

Of similar origin is the name Paharia, which is used for several languages of east-central India: see Paharia language (disambiguation).

== See also ==
- Pahari culture
