= Padari =

Padari may refer to:

- anything of, from, or related to Padar, a region of Jammu and Kashmir, India
- Padari dialect, an Indo-Aryan dialect
- Padari, Estonia, a village in Estonia
- Padari, Pindra, a village in Uttar Pradesh, India
- Padari, Iran, a village in Iran

== See also ==
- Padri (disambiguation)
