= Padri =

Padri may refer to:

- Priest, used in addressing or referring to a priest or father
- Islamist puritans who fought against Minangkabau traditionalists in the Padri War
- Padri (film), a 2005 Indian Konkani-language film
- anything of, from, or related to Padar, a region of Jammu and Kashmir, India
  - Padri dialect, an Indo-Aryan dialect
- Padri, Iran, a village in Bushehr Province, Iran
- Kerala-no-dhoro (also known as Padri), an archaeological site in Gujarat, India

== See also ==
- Padari (disambiguation)
