= Pangi Valley =

Pangi
- Tehsil
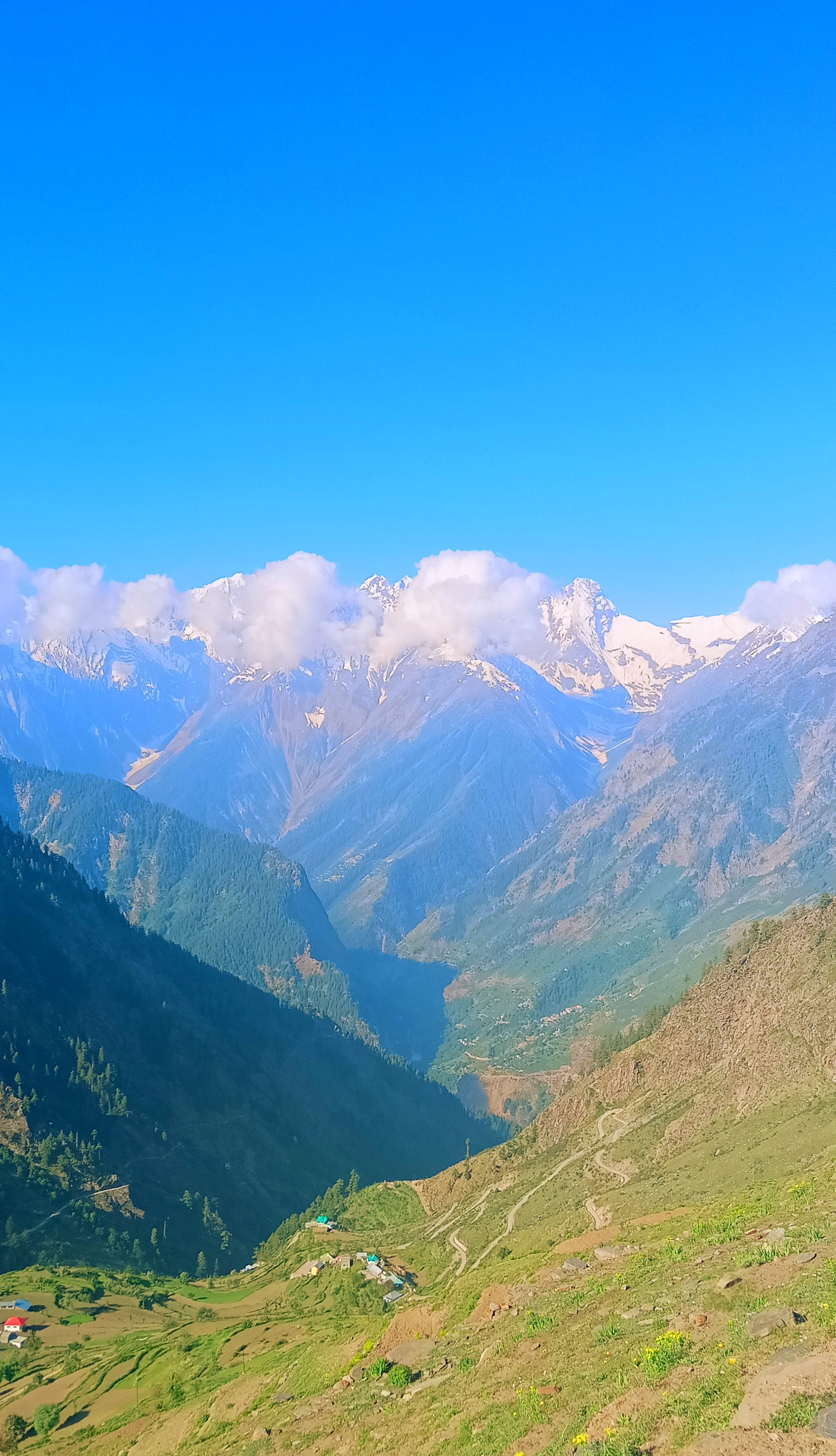
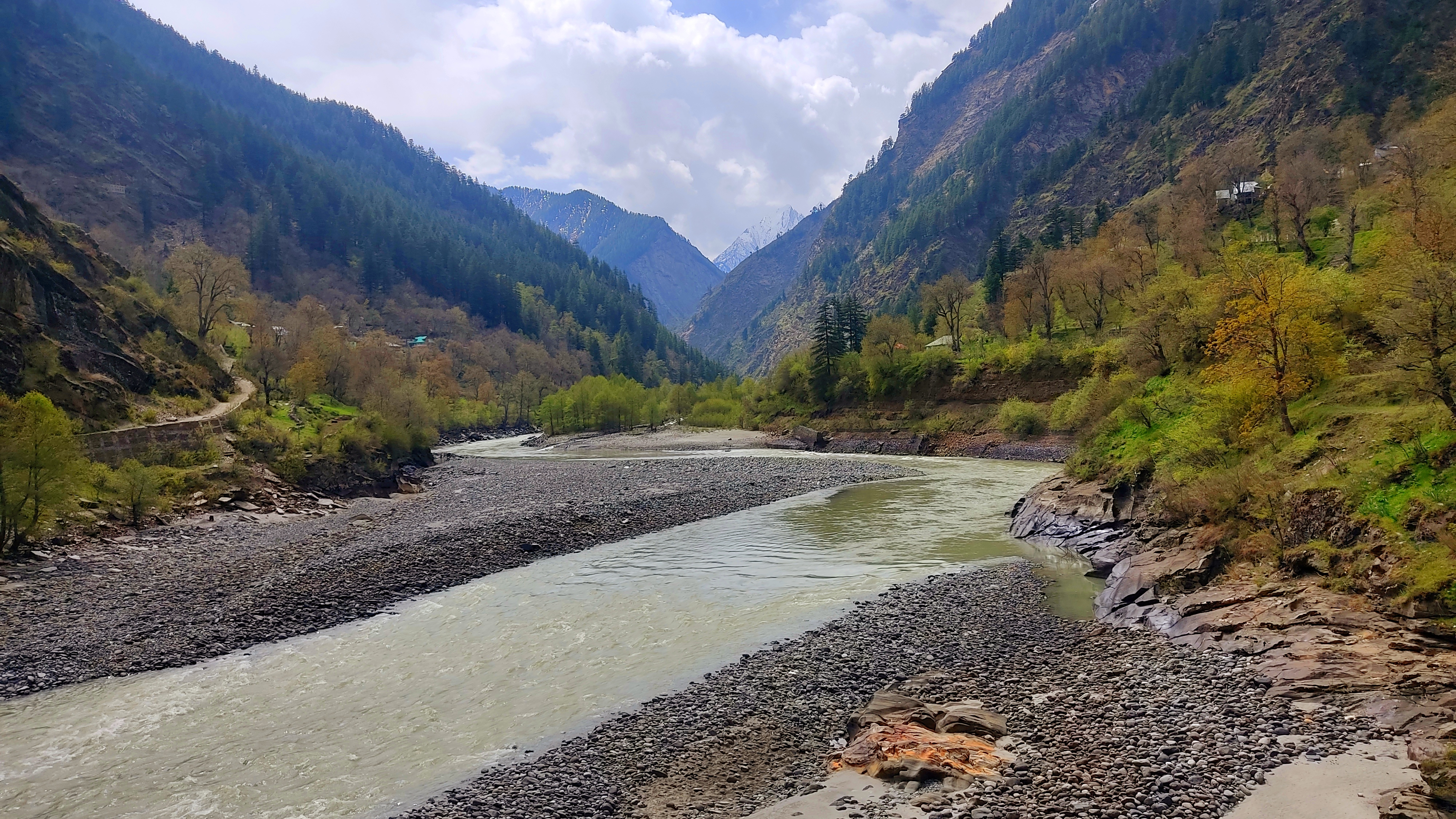
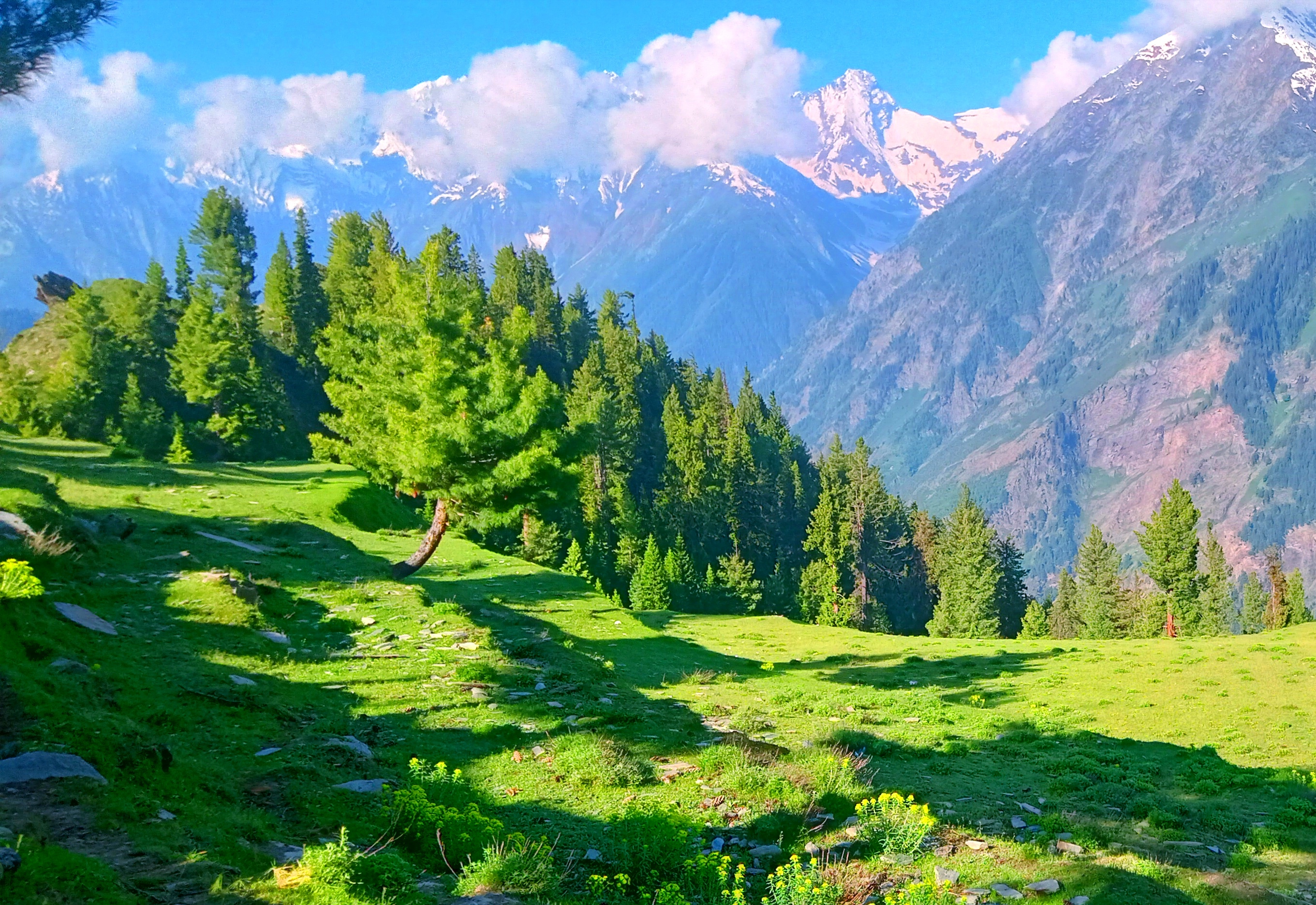
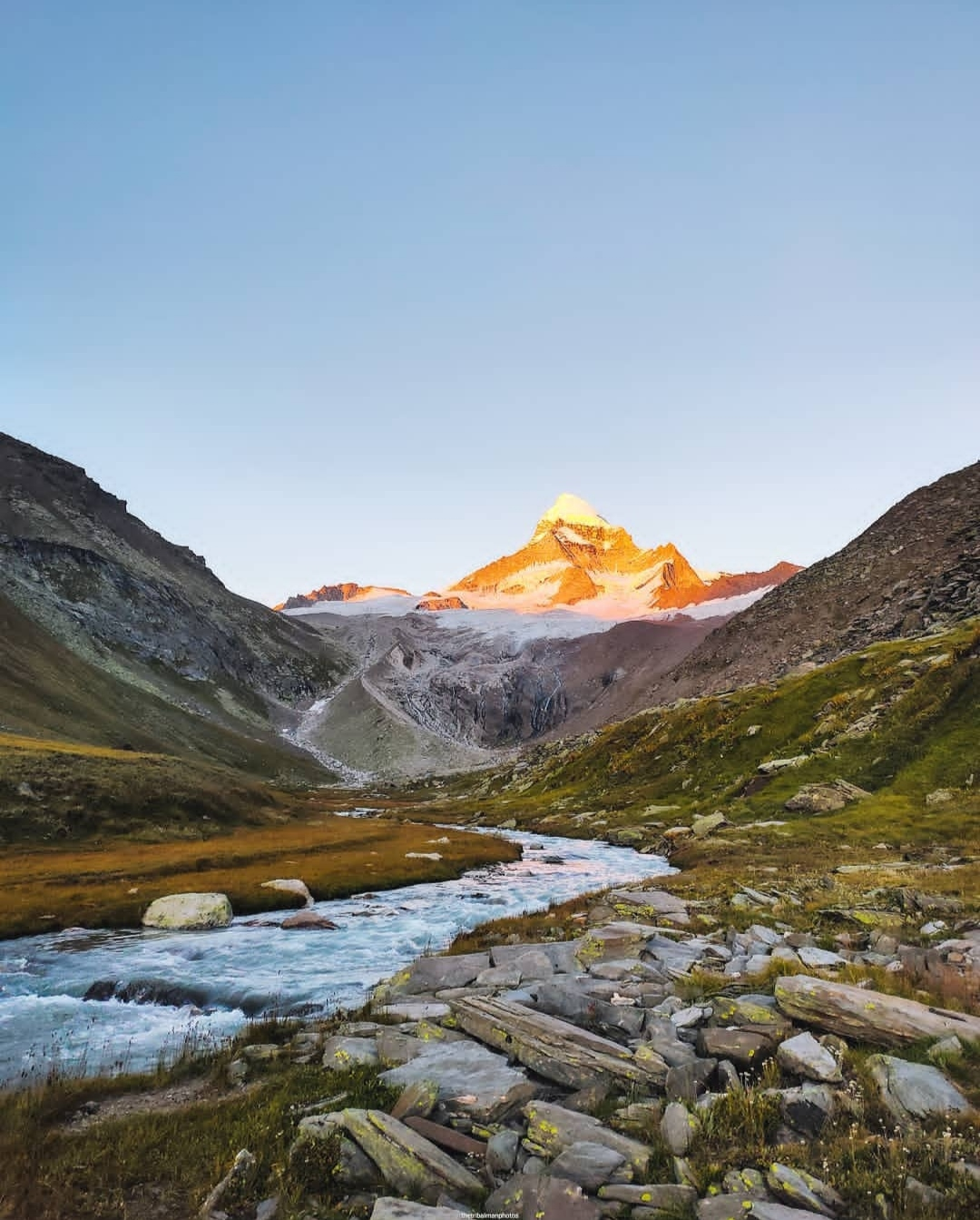
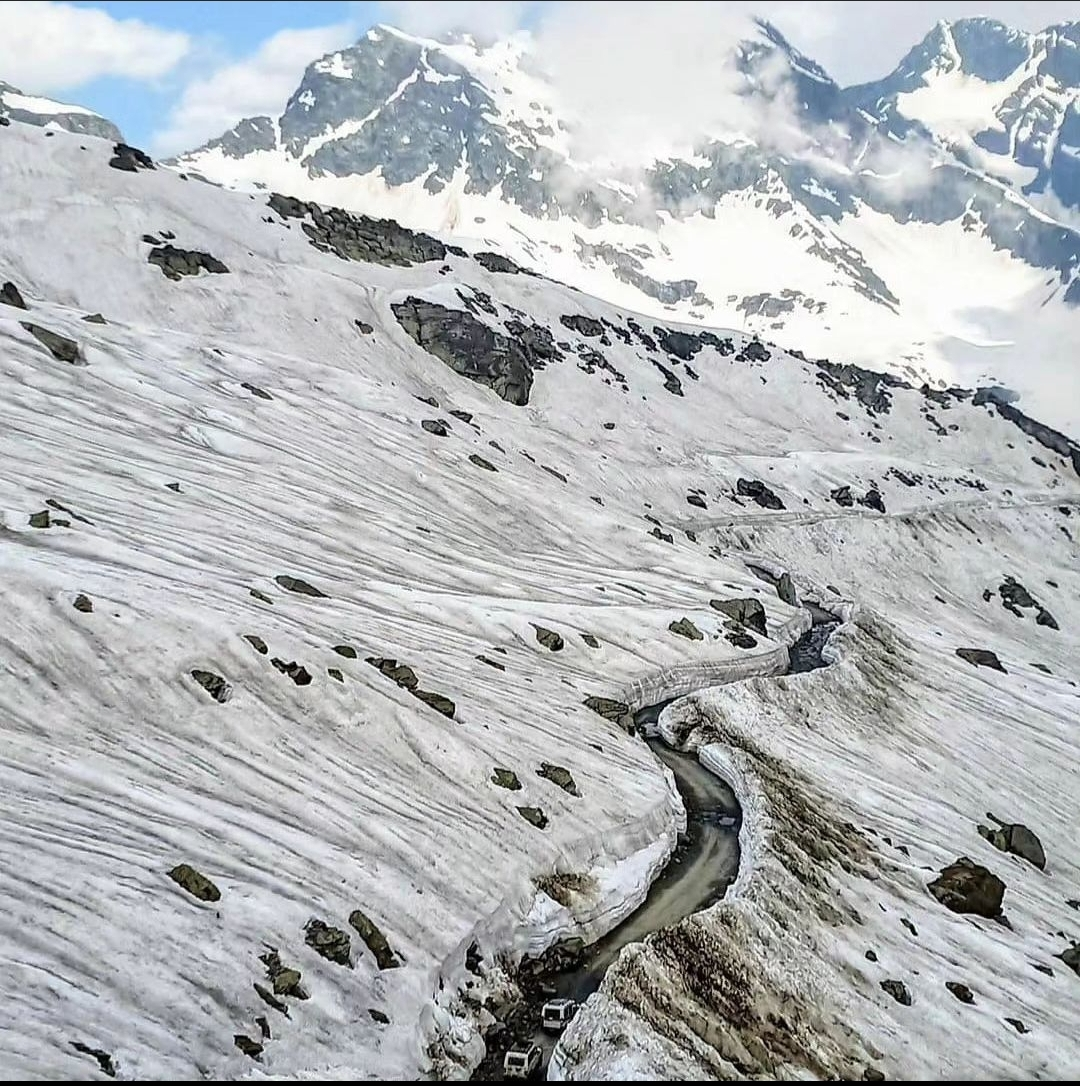
- Clockwise from top left: View of the valley, Chandrabhaga River, Sach Pass, Shiva Peak, and a meadow in the valley

- Location in Himachal Pradesh, India Pangi (India)
- Coordinates: 33.084014°N 76.406980°E
- Country: India
- State: Himachal Pradesh
- District: Chamba

Government
  - Body: Government of Himachal Pradesh
  - Himachal Pradesh Legislative Assembly: Janak Raj
  - Member of Parliament: Kangana Ranaut

Area
  - Total: 1,601 km^{2} (618 sq mi)

Population (2011)
  - Total: 18,868
  - Density: 11.79/km^{2} (30.52/sq mi)
- Demonym: Pangwal

Languages
  - Official: Hindi
  - Local: Pangwali
- Time zone: UTC+5:30 (IST)
- PIN: 176323
- Vehicle registration: HP 45

Pangi is a tehsil in Chamba, Himachal Pradesh, India. Situated at the northern extreme of the state, it is an isolated valley bordered by the Zanskar Range to the north and the Pir Panjal Range to the south. According to the 2011 census of India, the Pangi Valley has a total population of 18,868. It shares boundaries with Lahaul and Spiti on the eastern side and with Jammu and Kashmir on the northern and northwestern side. Chandrabhaga cuts across the terrain in a deep narrow gorge before entering Paddar region of Jammu and Kashmir. With its deep river gorges and barren mountain peaks, it offers a wide range of scenery and vegetation. Till recently, this valley was the remotest Tribal area of Himachal Pradesh where road access to the rest of the state was established only in the mid-1990s. So forbidding was this snowy range regarded in former times of the Princely regime, that every State official proceeding to Pangi on duty was granted a special allowance, under the head of ‘‘funeral expenses”, as his return, alive or dead, was not taken at all to be a matter of certainty or even of high expectation.

== History ==
The history of Pangi is documented through local inscriptions, oral traditions, and folklore. Prior to the establishment of princely state rule, the region was governed by local chieftains. Local legends also indicate that the area's population historically migrated from neighboring regions like Kashmir, Lahaul and Chamba. It is possible that occasionally, owing to political influence, part of central Asian trade deviated from its original course and followed the less accessible valley of Cinab, but under ordinary circumstances it must always have returned to its natural channels.

Earliest known written evidence of human settlements comes from the stone inscriptions at Luj and salhi.

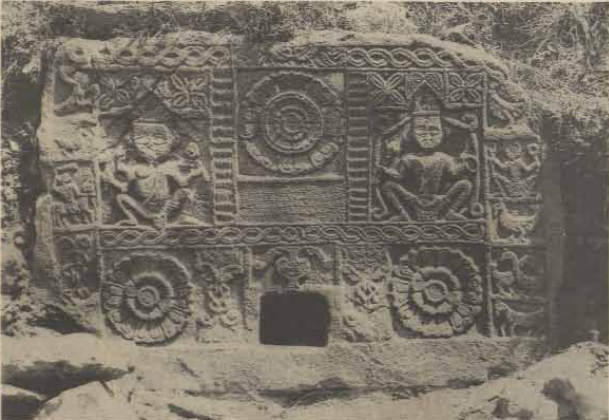
Luj village stone inscription

The inscription at Luj was erected by some local Rana of that time. It contains a verified description of the year when King Jasht Varman of Chamba ascended the throne. The inscription clearly states that this stone was erected during the first year of King Jasht Varman's reign. The establishment year is noted as samvat 8, which corresponds to the year 1105 AD. From this year onward, the chronology of the Chamba kings became accurate. The inscription suggests that At that time, the kingdom of Chamba extended up to the village of Luj in Pangi.

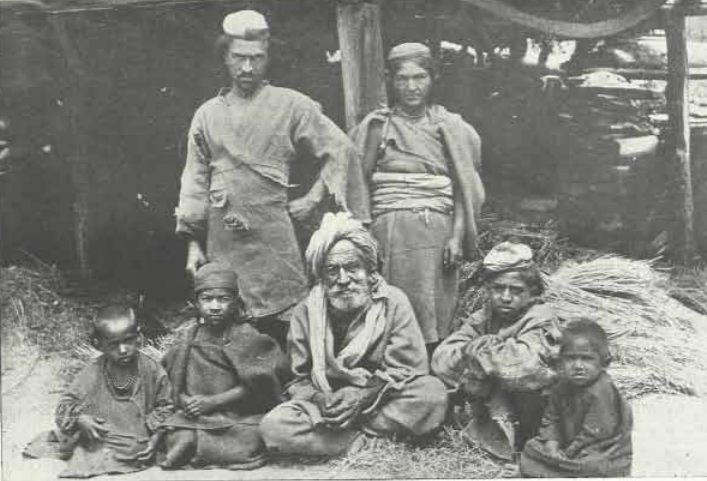
Rana family at Salhi.

The inscription at salhi reveals that the stone was established in the 27th year of King Lalit Varman's reign by a rana named Rajanaka Ludarpal. The year of establishment is given as Shastra Samvat 46, which was in use in the Chamba kingdom at that time. Upon calculating the timeline, King Lalit Varman's reign is determined to have started in 1143 CE, and his 27th year corresponds to 1170 CE. On that stone, Pangi was referred to as "पंगति", while in the local language, people called it "पैंगइ". These stone inscriptions suggest that local ranas ruled the area under the suzerainty of the kings of Chamba. The descendants of these ranas still live humble peasant lives in the area.

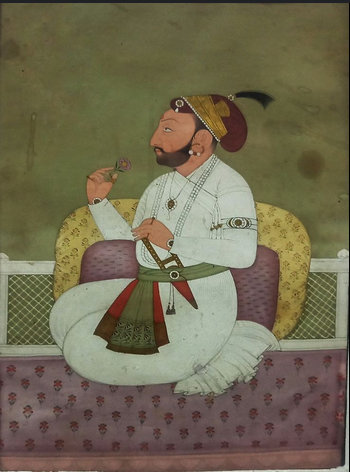
Portrait of Raja Prithvi Singh of Chamba (r. mid-17th century), who regained control of Pangi Valley, consolidated the Chamba kingdom, and improved the administration of Pangi.

Next king to take complete control of Pangi valley was Prithvi Singh.Prithvi singh's father was dethroned by Jagat Singh of Nurpur. Prithvi Singh asked and obtained help in money and troops from the rajas of Mandi and Suket, to enable him to recover his kingdom. Passing through kullu, he crossed the Rohtang Pass into Lahaul and advanced into Pangi. He visited Mindhala temple and presented an inscription on a copper plate to the temple. Thereafter he crossed the Chanaini Pass and moved through Churah, and regained his throne at Chamba, expelling the Nurpur officials from the state. Prithvi Singh divided Pangi ilaqa into three parganas with their chief places at Sach,Killar and Dharwas.He also ordered the construction of State Kothis at these places and appointed state representatives at these Kothis.

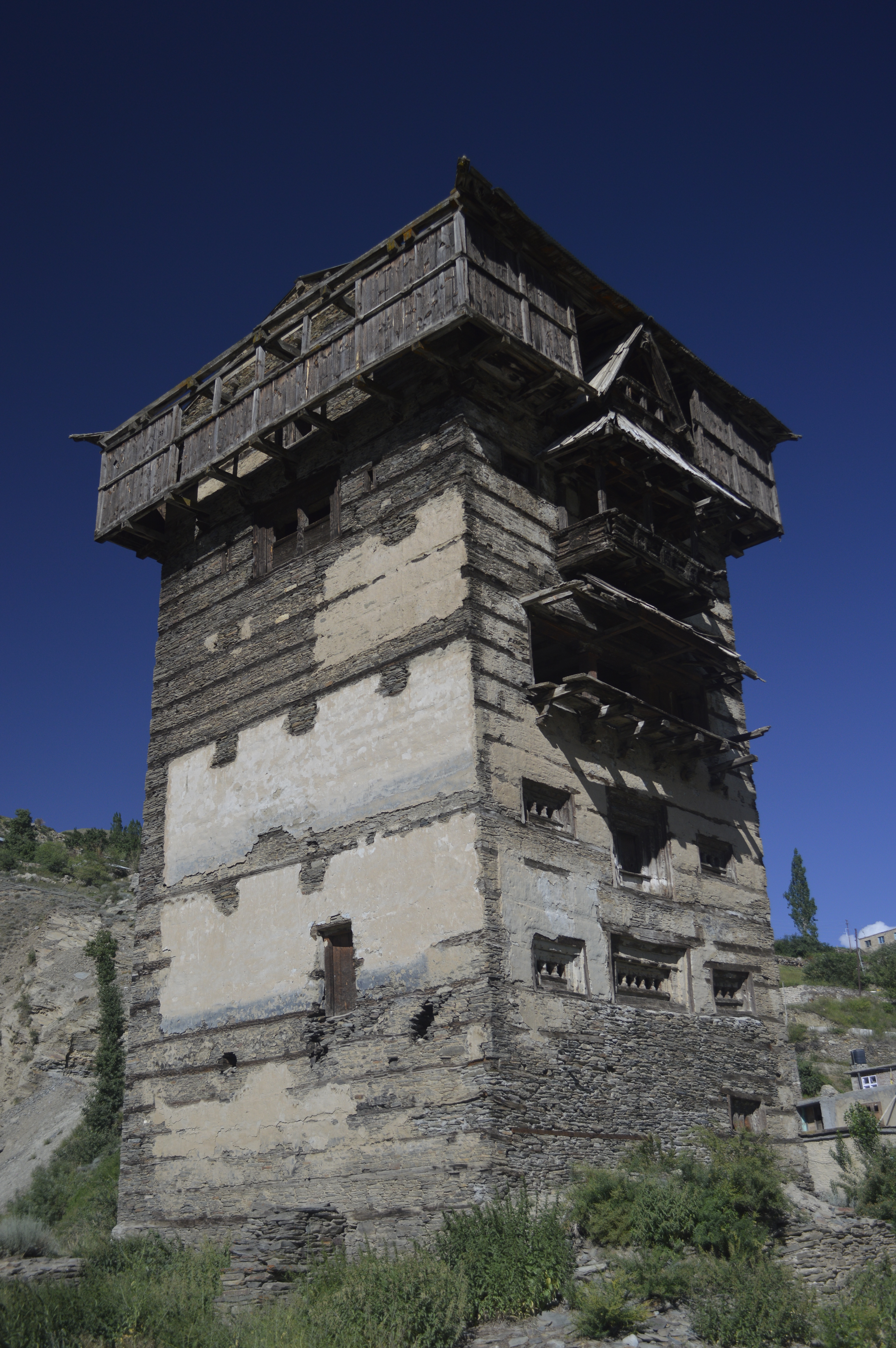
Gondhla Fort in Lahaul Valley (c. 1700). Similar kothis built by local thakurs in Pangi have been heavily damaged or destroyed by erosion.

A little farther down near the village of Phindru before the temple of Sidh baba the path has been partly hewn out of the solid rock. This was probably done in the reign of Prithvi Singh, as appears from rock-inscription containing the name of him and dated sastra 18 corresponding to A.D. 1642–3. The temple of Malasni Devi at Porthi village also bears an inscription of Prithvi Singh dated Sastra-Samvat 27 (A.D.1651).

Chatar Singh, Prithvi Singh's successor, also visited Pangi to extend his influence over the region. He led his army lower down the Chandrabhaga Valley, invading Paddar. There, he removed the local Ranas and appointed his own officials. He also founded a town on the plain, naming it Chatargarh. This town was later renamed Gulabgarh when the Dogra forces invaded it in 1836.

Other royal inscriptions in Pangi include two fountain stones at Porthi which were constructed in the reign of Ugar Singh in Sastra Samvat 1 (A.D.1725). The state Kothi at Sach also has an inscription in Takri recording the foundation of building by Raja Ugar singh in Samvat 1 (A.D.1725).

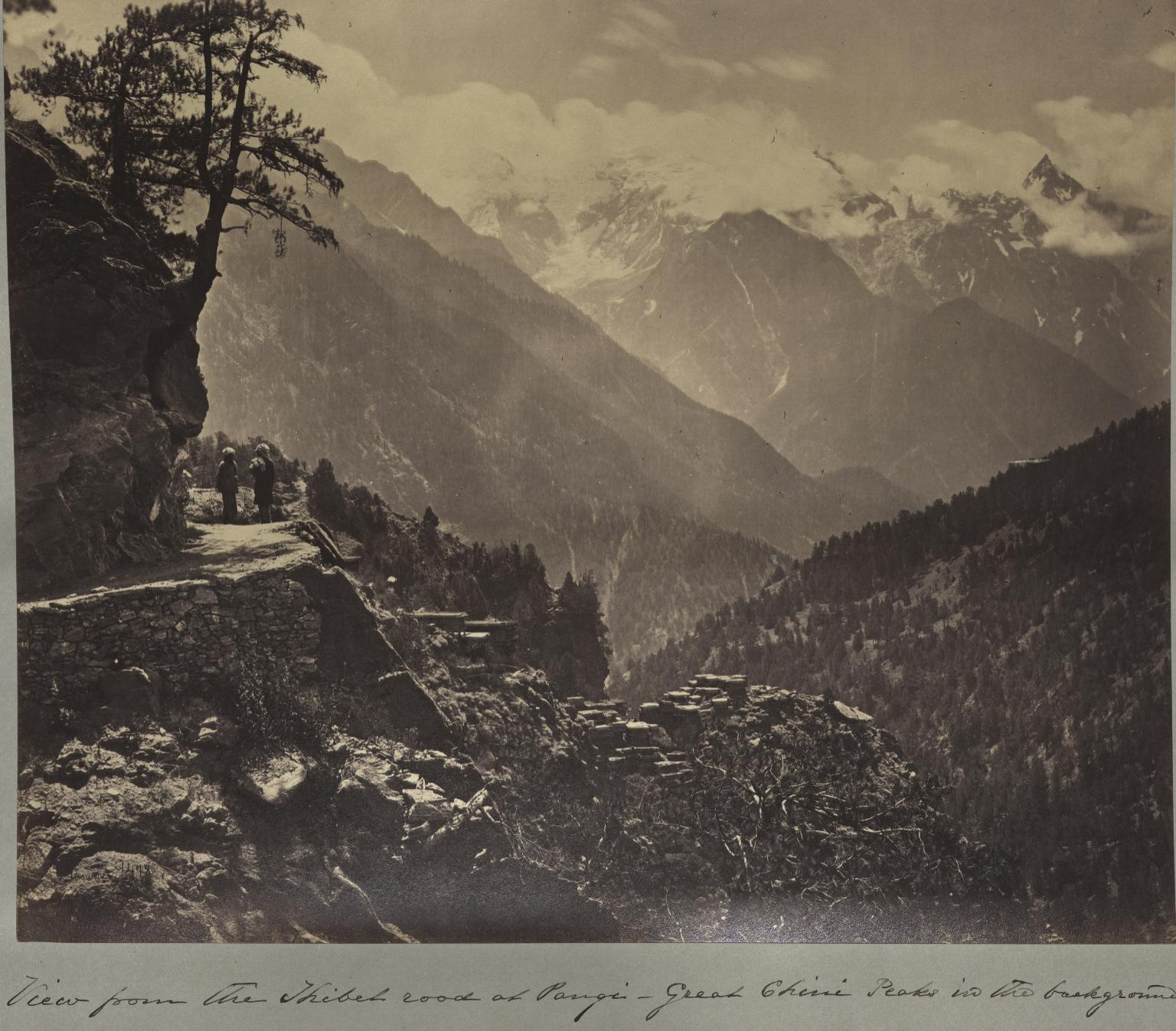
Foot and mule road through Pangi Valley, with the chaini peaks visible in the background (c. 1860–1870).

After the defeat of Sikhs in Punjab the area opened up to the British. In 1864, major Blair Reid who was British superintendent to chamba state convinced the Raja to transfer the management of forests of chamba state including the forests of Pangi to the British Government. This was formalized through a lease agreement dated 10 September 1864 for a duration of 99 years, with provisions for revision every 20 years. Under the terms of the lease, the British Government agreed to pay the state an annual amount of Rs. 22,000. As a result, the forests of the valley were placed under the direct control of the Imperial Forest Department.The British extensively felled trees from the forests in the region, employing large-scale logging practices. The timber was floated downriver to the plains, where it was extracted and utilized for various purposes, including the construction of railway infrastructure and other projects. There was a famine in the valley in 1878–79 due to the early arrival of winter and the destruction of crops. Grain had to be imported from curah. Potatoes were introduced to the valley in 1878 by R.T. Burney, then superintendent of Chamba State.

J. Ph. Vogel played a crucial role in deciphering the recorded history of the Pangi Valley by documenting and translating the region's epigraphic heritage. Vogel analyzed major stone inscriptions across the villages of Salhi, Luj, Sach, Purthi, and Phindru, though he was unable to examine the fountain stone at Hudan as it had been destroyed by an avalanche. In addition to stone epigraphs, he deciphered two significant copper-plate inscriptions of the Mindhal temple issued by Raja Sangram Varman and Raja Prithvi Singh Varman regarding royal land grants to the temple.

Owing to its geographical isolation, seasonal inaccessibility, economic underdevelopment, and distinct cultural characteristics, the Pangwalas were recognized as a Scheduled Tribe in 1966, and Pangi tehsil was subsequently notified as a Scheduled Area under the Scheduled Areas (Himachal Pradesh) Order, 1975.

Pangi Valley experienced a catastrophic avalanche disaster during the first and second weeks of March 1979. Unseasonal snowfall of 4.5–6 meters was received, burying villages and destroying crops. A total of 232 people were killed, and 523 were reported missing in Lahaul and Pangi areas.

== Geography ==
The Pangi Valley is characterized by extremely difficult and rugged terrain with harsh climatic conditions. The landlocked Pangi is squeezed between two sub-systems of the Himalayas, the Zanskar Range and the Pir Panjal Range, resulting in a predominantly mountainous landscape dotted with numerous valleys. The valley's altitudinal range varies from approximately 2,000 meters at Sansari Nallah to over 6,000 meters, encompassing the lofty peaks near the Zanskar Range. Several peaks within this valley remain unclimbed to date. Pangi features several beautiful sub-valleys, including the Sural Valley, Hudan Valley, Saichu Valley, and Parmar Valley, many of which provide routes leading to the Zanskar Range.

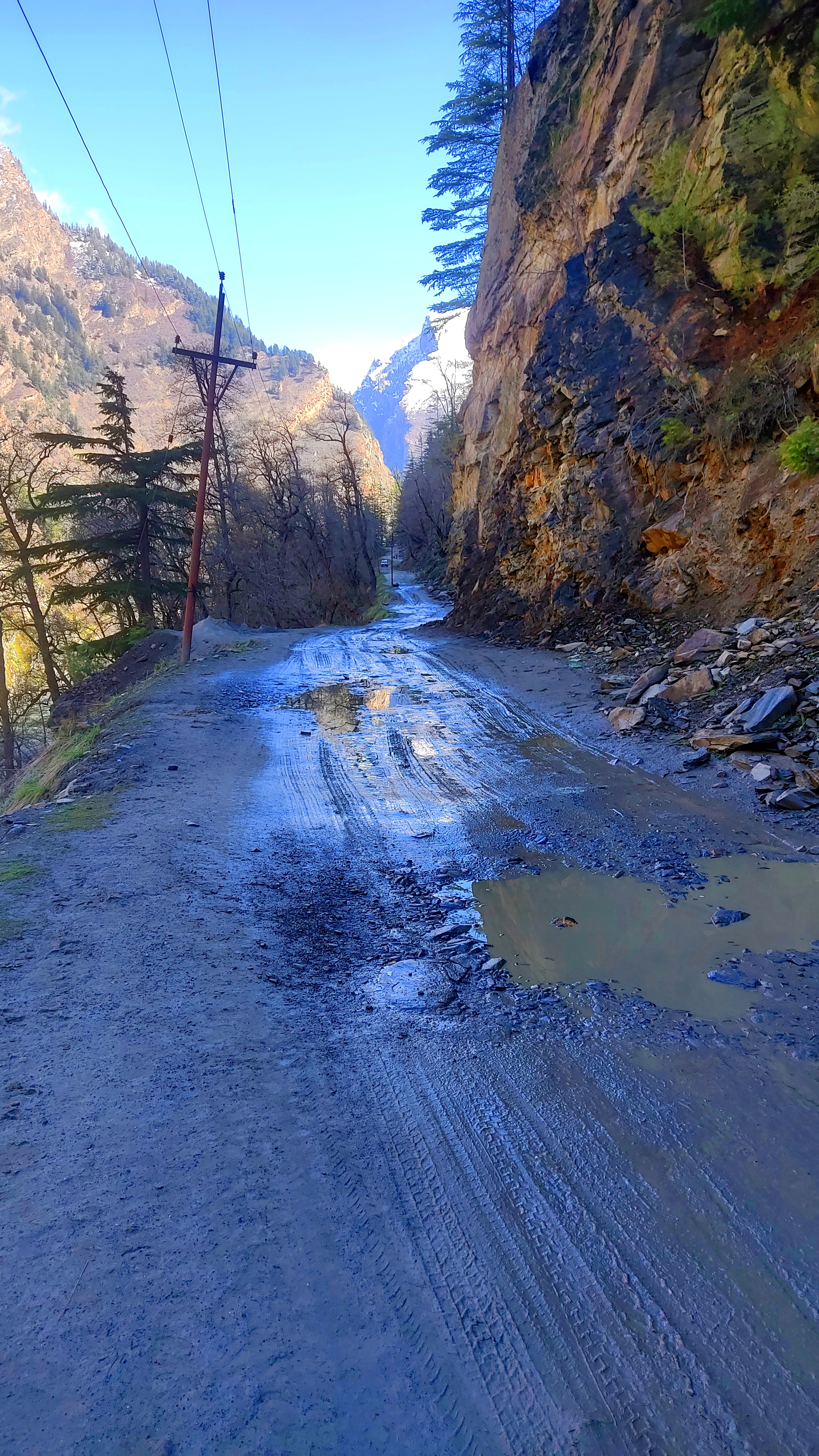
Roads in Pangi Valley

From a biogeographical perspective, the Pangi region lies in the transition zone between the Himalayas and the Trans-Himalayas. This is reflected in the region's faunal composition, which exhibits a blend of elements from both zones. This unique combination makes the Pangi Valley one of the most faunistically diverse areas in the western Himalayas and a priority region for conservation.

The river Chandrabhaga flows through the entire length of the valley, covering a distance of nearly 85 kilometers from Karru Nallah to Sansari Nallah. The river originates from the mountains of the Baralacha Pass.

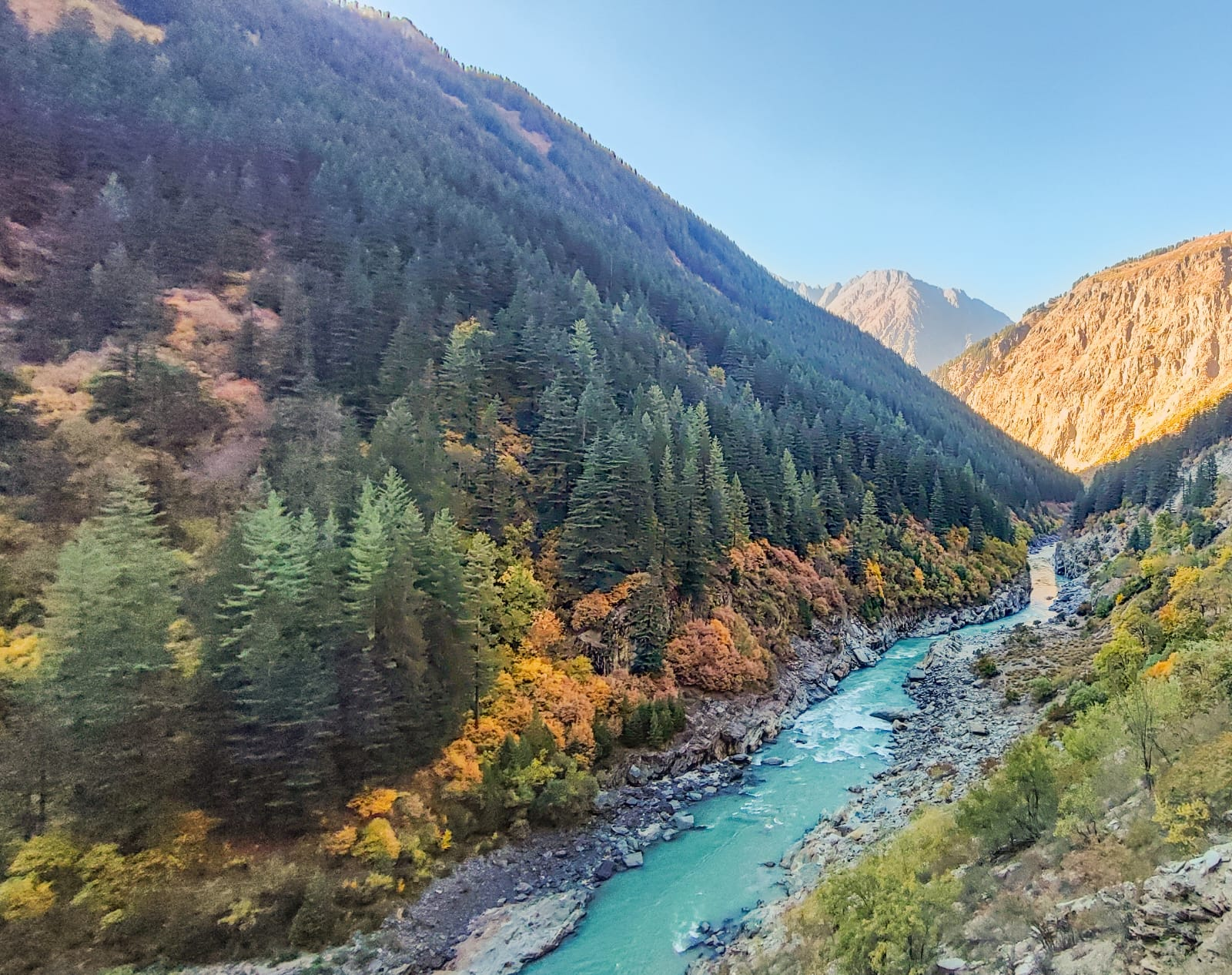
Chandrabhaga in Pangi valley.

The Chandrabhaga divides the Pangi Valley into two unequal parts: the larger right bank, which gradually rises to the Zanskar range, and the narrow left flank, which ascends steeply towards the Pir Panjal range.

The main tributaries of the Chandrabhaga in the Pangi Valley are Karru Nallah and Saichu Nallah. The Saichu Nallah joins the Chandrabhaga from the right near the settlement of Cherry Bungalow. The Saichu Nallah is further fed by several tributaries, the chief among which are Twan, Saichu, and Chasak, which converge at Saichu village. Several small streams originating from the Zanskar Range feed the river on its right bank. The waters of the Chandrabhaga are grey in color during summer due to the melting snow from its numerous sources.

== Mountaineering Expeditions ==
The highest peak of Pangi Valley is Mount Menthosa at 6443 metres. The second-highest peak is Baihali S. at 6310 metres. Baihali jot another peak on the same ridgeline as Baihali S. is at 6220 metres. Another major peak is Shiva Peak(also called Bahai Jar) at 6142 metres. Other major peaks include Malkutu Jot(6058m), Sersank Peak(6050m). Most of these peaks were ascended from the Miyar Valley of Lahaul in the 1970s. From the Pangi side, mountaineering began very late due to the area's remoteness and the lack of infrastructure in the valley.

In 1988, Japanese climber Junko Tabei, the first woman to summit Mount Everest, led the first recorded ascent of Shiva Peak via its southwest face from the Parmar village of the Pangi Valley. In 2001, a Japanese expedition achieved the first ascent of Baihali Jot by its north ridge. The following year, an Indian expedition completed the second ascent of Shiva using Tabei's route.

In 2004, Chris Bonington, Harish Kapadia, and their team tried to ascend the Shiva Peak from the Saichu Valley and climbed Jot Mund (5,130 m), Jambu Peak (5,105 m), and Pimu Peak (5,480 m) on the watershed between the Paphita and Miyar valleys. In 2005, an Italian expedition led by Diego Stefani established a route from the Tarundi Valley and made the first ascent of Shiva Shankar West (from Sechu Valley), reaching an elevation of 5,860 m before continuing to the summit at 6,142 m.

Further exploration took place in 2007 when Bonington tried climbing Shiva Peak via the Sural Valley. While Bonington and Raj Kumar climbed an unnamed peak of 5,027 m, other members of the British team attempted the northwest face of Shiva Shankar but were forced to retreat because of unstable rock conditions. In 2008, Japanese climbers Kazuo Kozu, Hidetaka Iizuka, and Reiko Maruyama, assisted by Indian porters, completed the first ascent of Shiva Shankar from Sural Valley.

Mount Menthosa is still unclimbed via its icy northwestern face from the Pangi valley due to its extreme difficulty.

== Climate ==
By virtue of its geographic location beyond the reach of the tropical monsoon rains, the agro-climatic conditions of the Pangi Valley fall under the cold and dry zone. The overall climate of the valley is semi-arid, typical of the inner Himalayas. It is characterized by cool summers with little rainfall and severe winters. Summers are cool and pleasant, with daytime temperatures ranging from 10 °C to 20 °C (50 °F to 68 °F). The nights remain cold, often dropping below 10 °C (50 °F). This season is the most suitable for travel and trekking, as most roads and high passes remain open. The valley becomes accessible via Sach Pass and other routes during this period. Heavy snowfall, strong winds, and frequent avalanches during winters confine people to their homes. Winters are severe, with temperatures frequently dropping below −20 °C (−4 °F), particularly in the upper regions. Snowfall begins in higher altitudes after mid-October and reaches lower elevations by mid-December. Most areas receive heavy snowfall, ranging between 300 and 470 cm, from December to March, while the lofty peaks remain under perpetual snow cover. During this time, most streams freeze, and the valley becomes completely isolated due to heavy snow blocking all access routes. The aerial route remains the only way to reach Pangi during winter. The state government maintains a helicopter service for emergency situations. The weather begins to improve in April, and by June–July, daytime temperatures in the valley reach a comfortable 28 degrees Celsius. However, the side valleys of Pangi, such as Sural, Hudan, and Saichu, remain significantly colder, often experiencing foggy and chilly afternoons even during the summer months.

== Flora and fauna ==
Being located in the transition zone between the Himalayas and the Trans-Himalayas, the Pangi Valley exhibits a unique mix of floral and faunal elements from both regions. It is also one of the most faunistically diverse areas in the western Himalayas. Due to its remoteness and low population density (approximately 9 people per square kilometer), the anthropogenic pressure on the environment is relatively low, and the forest cover remains largely intact in most parts of the region. As a result, the Pangi Valley represents a potentially ideal sanctuary for a variety of wild animal species.

The Chandrabhaga Valley is dominated by deodar forests with some blue pine or kail and fir stands at higher elevations. Particularly on the left bank, the deodar forests have large patches of scrub and some grasses. Undergrowth is rare in the coniferous forests, but in depressions, moist and open slopes, other broadleaved species do occur.

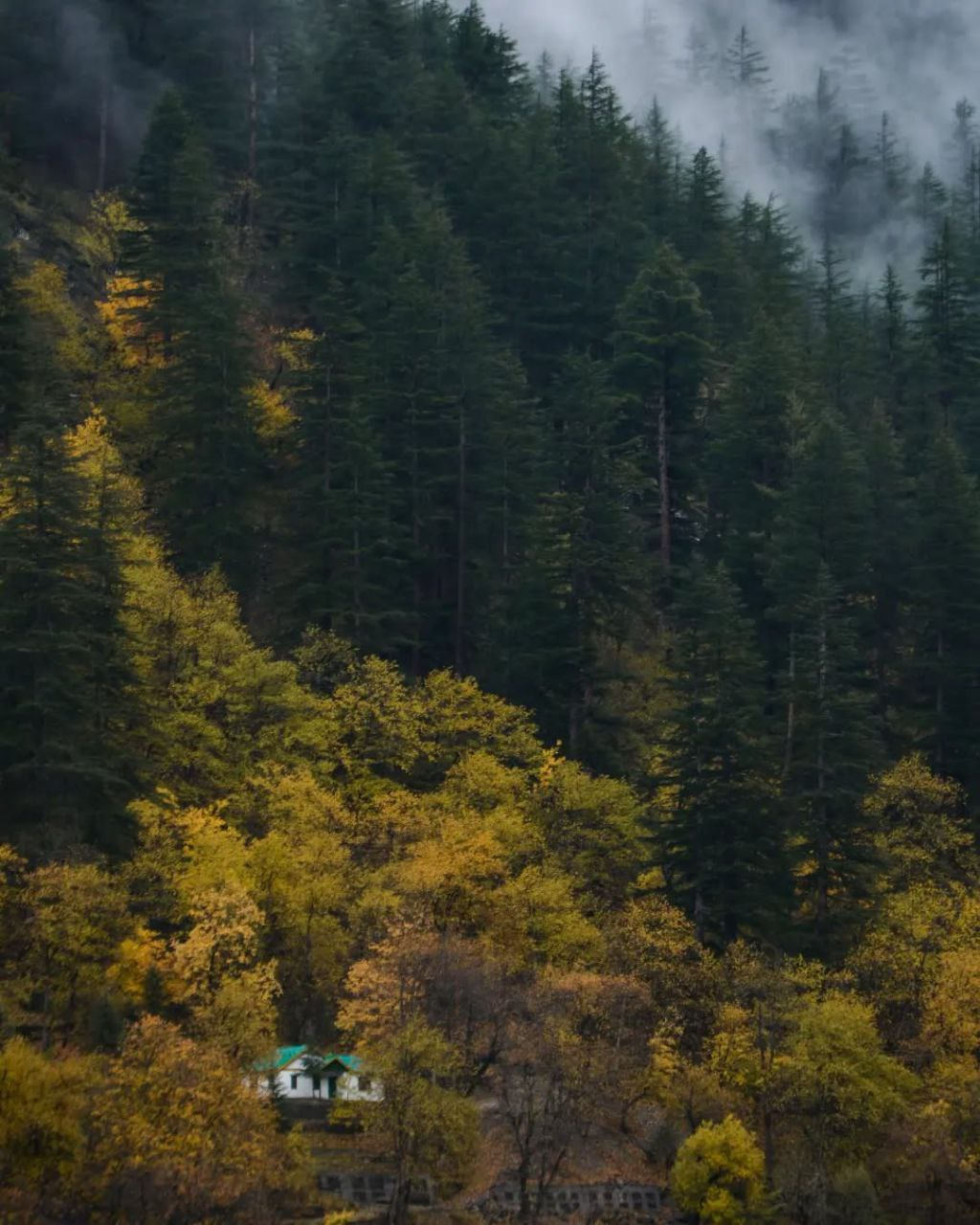
Broadleaved forest in Pangi Valley.

Depressions and moist slopes also have patches of broadleaved forests dominated by species such as hazelnut, walnut, maple, elm, willow, and poplar. Further downstream near Luj, Chilgoza pine and horse chestnut trees are also present in substantial proportions. All along the lower valley are open patches with grass and sedges with scattered trees.

Most valleys on the right bank of the Chenab are east–west flowing, presenting a clear north and south face. The north-facing slopes are dominated mostly by birch forests up to an elevation of approximately 3,800 meters, which are sometimes interspersed with willow and honeysuckle. Beyond this, patches of dense willow scrub exist up to approximately 4,000 meters. In the lower Seichu Valley, the northern slopes are dominated by kail and deodar, while birch dominates above approximately 3,200 meters. In the entire valley, above the birch and willows, are alpine meadows with relatively high cover of forbs and graminoids.

The valley also supports a diverse range of fauna adapted to its high-altitude environment. Herbivorous species include the Asiatic ibex, Himalayan tahr,

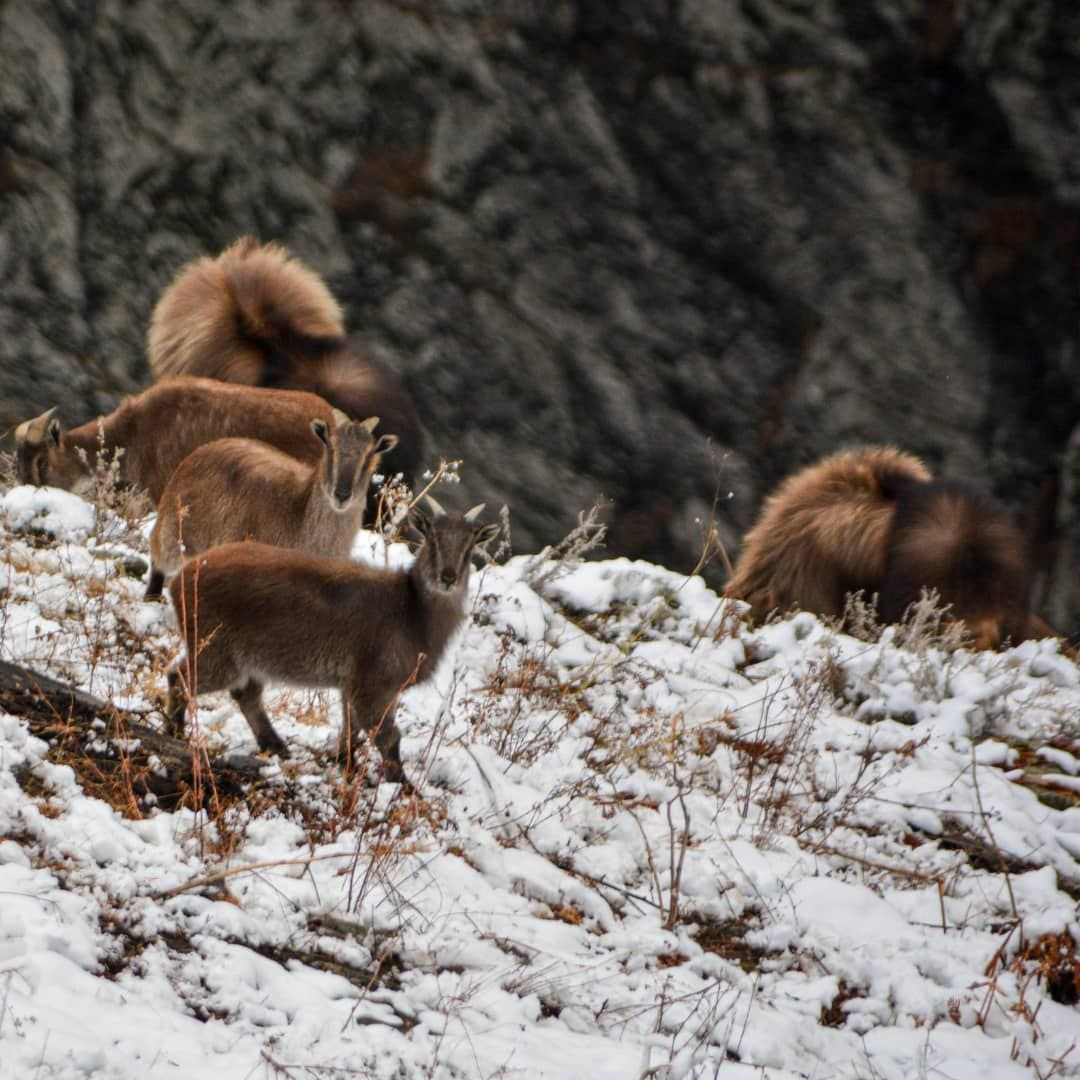
Himalayan tahrs in Pangi Valley.

Himalayan musk deer, grey goral, Himalayan serow, markhor, hangul, and long-tailed marmot. Predatory mammals found in the valley include the elusive snow leopard, brown bear, Himalayan black bear, Tibetan wolf, and red fox. These species contribute to the rich biodiversity of the region, reflecting the unique ecological characteristics of the Pangi Valley. A few interesting patterns can be noted regarding occurrence of species. True Himalayan species such as the Himalayan tahr and serow are confined to the left bank of the river, while the right bank is home to the more Trans-Himalayan elements such as the ibex and the snow leopard. Other ‘Himalayan’ species such as the black bear, musk deer and goral occurred on the right bank also, but were more confined in distribution.

== Society and culture ==
The people of Pangi, like those in other Himalayan regions, are generally cheerful and light-hearted. Due to the area's geographical isolation, life remains relatively secluded and less affected by the fast-paced, competitive lifestyle common in the plains and sub-Himalayan areas of India.

The Pangwal community is composed predominantly of Thakurs and Brahmins (Pandits), with Thakurs forming the majority. Other caste groups such as Dom, Kumhar, and others are present in smaller but notable numbers. Many villages in the region bear names derived from Kashmiri surnames. Examples include Bhatwas, meaning “abode of the Bhats,” and Dharwas, meaning “abode of the Dhars.”

The Pangwal community is deeply religious, with a particular devotion to Devi, Nag (serpent deities), and Shiva. They follow a unique form of Hinduism which is quite related to ancient Kashmir Shavism. They have the tradition of worshipping Shiv-Shakti. The principal temple is that of Mindhal Basini Devi, located in Mindhal, which serves as an important pilgrimage site. Other notable shrines in the valley include those dedicated to Malasan, Sitla Devi, and Det Nag, among many others.

The attire for men includes woollen pyjamas, shirts, a white cloth cap, and pulans (locally made straw shoes). Whereas the old traditional attire for men consists of a Choga which a long tunic flary at the bottom paired with tight pyjamas. Women typically wear a kurta with tight, dark-colored trousers, a woollen shawl called Chador (often called pardah) and a cloth cap known locally as juji. Most garments are made from wool, which is well-suited to the cold climate. The staple food grains of the region include barley, rye (locally known as elo), wheat, buckwheat, and millets such as sud and china, which are considered lower-grade varieties. Meat is primarily consumed during the winter months.

=== Festivals ===
The following are the chief festivals observed in the Pangi Valley:

1. Bishu is celebrated on the first day of Baisakh (around mid-April). Small wheaten cakes known as sanj, cooked in ghee, are prepared, along with offerings of incense, vermilion, flowers, rice, ghee, and gur to the local Devi (goddess).
2. Utrain is held on the first day of Magha (January–February) in honor of ancestors. It is customary to offer food to any visitor who enters the home. Community-wide feasting is a hallmark of the occasion.
3. Showrach corresponds to Maha Shivaratri and is celebrated in the month of Phalguna (February–March). Devotees observe a fast, consuming food only in the evening. Offerings made to Shiva include fried suet, ghee, and buttermilk (chhach). These offerings are later consumed to break the fast.
4. Khaul Mela takes place on the Magha Purnima. Each hamlet selects a lead person to carry a large, lighted torch, which is ceremonially waved before the village deity. In the evening, residents celebrate with feasts and playful rituals involving small torches known as dinkhol. These torches are swung around the head and thrown at walnut trees. It is believed that if a torch gets caught in the branches, the thrower will be blessed by the deities.
5. Jukaru Mela is observed on the new moon of Magha or Phalguna, following Shivratri. It marks the arrival of spring and is celebrated with joy and reverence. As with Bishu, families prepare a totu of sattu and ghee topped with a flower. At dawn, family gods and sacred objects are worshipped, younger members pay respects to elders, and households exchange food and greetings with neighbors and friends using the traditional phrase shubh shagan'. Visiting continues throughout the day to nearby and distant villages.

== Demographics ==
Pangi Tehsil of Chamba district has a total population of 18,868 as per the Census 2011. Out of which 9,579 are males while 9,289 are females. The Sex Ratio of Pangi Tehsil is 970.
