= Batwas =

- Location in Jammu and Kashmir
- Coordinates: 33.190°N 76.369°E
- Country: India
- State: Jammu and Kashmir
- District: Kishtwar district

Population (2011)
  - Total: 259

Languages
  - Spoken: Padri dialect, Ladakhi, Dogri
- Time zone: UTC+5:30 (IST)

Batwas is a village in Kishtwar district of Jammu and Kashmir in India. It is located in Gandhari valley.

== See also ==
- Kishtwar district
