= Mindhal Mata Temple =

Village and pilgrimage site in Himachal Pradesh, India

Mindhal Mata Temple (Mindhal Devi Temple)
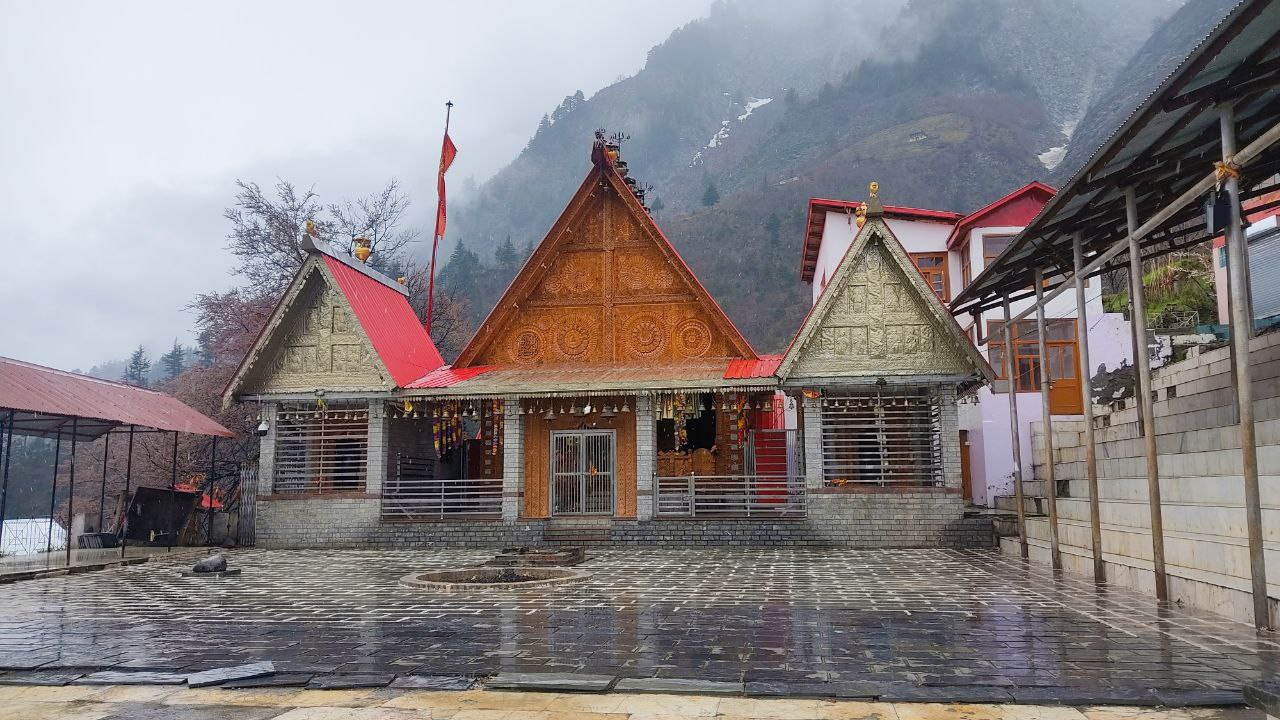
- Mindhal Mata Temple.

- Himachal Pradesh, India Mindhal Mata Temple (India)

Religion
- Affiliation: Hinduism
- Deity: Chamunda
- Festival: Bhādon mela

Location
- Location: Mindhal, Pangi Valley, Chamba district, Himachal Pradesh, India
- Coordinates: 32°59′00″N 76°27′00″E

Architecture
- Style: Himalayan temple architecture
- Completed: Ancient (exact date unknown)

The Mindhal Mata Temple (also called the Mindhal Devi Temple, and the temple of Chámunda) is in the Pangi Valley, situated on the left bank of the Chenab River, opposite Sách. The temple has been a place of pilgrimage from ancient time. A mela is held here in Bhádon, and is frequented by people from all the neighbouring valleys. The people spend their time at this mela in drinking and dancing. The priest and chela are Brahmans.

== Location ==
Mindhal is situated in the remote and mountainous Pangi region, part of the Chamba district. The area is known for its rugged terrain, traditional wooden architecture, and deeply rooted spiritual traditions.

== Structure ==
The temple is square in shape, with a pent roof in the usual style of deví temples in the hills. The structure is of wood and stone, and consists of a central cella with two verandahs, one being enclosed and the other open. The image is of black stone in human form, which is believed to have risen out of the ground, and to extend downwards to a great depth.

== Legends and history ==
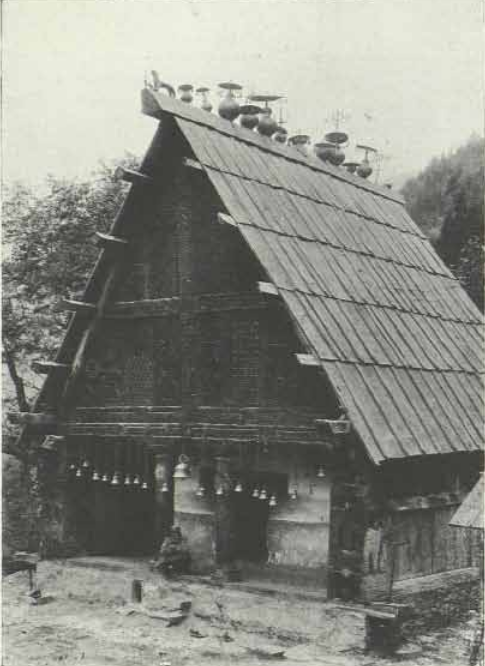
Temple of Chamunda at Mindhal. From Antiquities of Chamba State, Part I (1911) by J. Ph. Vogel.

There is a legend associated with Mindhal Devi. The spot where the temple now stands was originally occupied by a house with an upper and lower storey—typical of homes in Pangi Valley. The house belonged to a widow who lived there with her seven sons. One day, in early autumn, while she was cooking in the upper storey, a black stone suddenly appeared in the chulha (hearth), causing her great annoyance. She tried to push it away, but her efforts were in vain. Eventually, she began to tremble, and realized that the stone was a manifestation of a Devi (goddess).

Startled, she rushed outside and called out to her sons, who were ploughing a nearby field with two oxen per plough, telling them that a deví had appeared in their house. The sons dismissed her claim and mockingly asked if the goddess would allow them to plough using only one ox, or provide them with a sisan (a local term, possibly referring to a specific agricultural tool or divine aid). Immediately, as punishment for their disbelief, the widow and her sons were turned to stone—the mother inside the house, and the sons out in the field. From that time onward, it is said that only one ox is used per plough in Mindhal, and the area has been considered an ādān (a tax-free religious land grant) for many centuries.

King Prithvi Singh visited Mindhala temple and made some donations along with an inscription on a copper plate to the temple. This plate is still in the possession of the temple and is dated Vikrama 1698, Śāstra 17 (AD 1641).

== See also ==
- Chamba district
- Chamunda
- Himachal Pradesh
- Pangi Valley
