= Kashmir Sapphire =

Rare variety of blue sapphire

Kashmir sapphire is a rare and highly prized variety of blue sapphire known for its rich, velvety hue and exceptional transparency. Discovered in the late 19th century in Kashmir, India, the finest stones exhibit a deep cornflower blue color with a soft, glowing appearance due to fine silk inclusions. Mined primarily from the 1880s to the early 1900s, these sapphires are now exceedingly rare and command top prices at auctions. Their unique characteristics distinguish them from sapphires of other origins, making them some of the most sought-after gems in the world.

== History ==
In 1882, a group of traders from the Padder Valley in Zanskar mountain range found these stones following a landslide, these sapphires were exceptional and beautiful. When Maharaja of Kashmir came to know about the sapphires, he dispatched miners who worked for summer months and retrieved sapphires of size up to 5 inches, the royal guards protected the mines immediately after the discovery for up to 5 years until the exhaustion of mines and subsequent requests were followed by the maharaja to British India for the discovery of more mines in the valley floor.
