= Gandhari Valley =

- Location in Jammu and Kashmir
- Coordinates: 33.190°N 76.369°E
- Country: India
- State: Jammu and Kashmir
- District: Kishtwar district

Languages
  - Spokem: Pangwali, Ladakhi
- Time zone: UTC+5:30 (IST)

Gandhari is a valley in Kishtwar district of Jammu and Kashmir region of India. It is an extension of Paddar Valley and abuts the other Indian territories of Ladakh and Himachal Pradesh.

It consists of six villages in which three are Hindu villages namely ( Bhatwas, Chagg & Muthal ) and rest three are Buddhist villages are ( Khajroni, Aliyah & Tun ). Every village has its own uniqueness besides tourist spot capability. Famous Chandi mata temple located in the chagg village where all the cultural festival of Goddess are celebrated with great unity, joy and glee. Naag devta Temple are located in bhatwas village. Aliyah village of Gandhari valley is famous for its buddhist monastery locally called Gompa.

The Panchayat of Gandhari Valley is named after its last village tun as TUN PYT.

The valley is rich in Natural Vegetation and Wildlife, Cultural diversity

== See also ==
- Paddar Valley
- Kishtwar district
