= Choga =

Choga may refer to:

- Choga (garment), a long-sleeved robe worn
- Choga (architecture), one of two traditional nature-friendly house types in Korea
