= Pangwali language =

Western Pahari language of India

Pangwali
- 𑚞𑚫𑚌𑚦𑚭𑚪𑚯, पंगवाड़ी
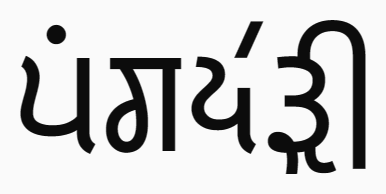
- The word "Pangwali" written in Takri script
- Native to: Himachal Pradesh; Jammu and Kashmir
- Region: Pangi Valley, Paddar
- Ethnicity: Pangwala
- Native speakers: 19,000 (2011)
- Language family: Indo-European: Indo-Iranian; Indo-Aryan; Northern; Western Pahari; Pangwali
- Dialects: Killar; Purthi; Sach; Dharwasi
- Writing system: Takri

Language codes
- ISO 639-3: pgg
- Glottolog: pang1282
- ELP: Pangwali

Pangwali (Takri: 𑚞𑚫𑚌𑚦𑚭𑚪𑚯) is an Indo-Aryan language. It is spoken in the Pangi Tehsil of Chamba district, and is threatened to go extinct. Pangwali is natively written in the Takri script, but Devanagari is used as well. It is very similar to the Padderi dialect of Padder, J&K.

== Classification ==
The linguist George Abraham Grierson recorded Pangwali as a dialect of Chambeali in his Linguistic Survey of India. It is now regarded as a language in its own right as a part of Western Pahari, affiliated with Bhadarwahi, Padderi among others. The language also shares a lot of vocabulary and grammatical features with Kashmiri language.

Pangwali has about 90% inherent intelligibility with Padderi, 24% with Mandeali, 22% with Kangri, 44% with Chambeali, and 75% with Bhadarwahi. Its lexical similarity , 27% with Kullu Pahari, and 75% with Bhadarwahi.

== Phonology ==
Consonants
		Bilabial	Dental	Alveolar	Postalveolar	Retroflex	Palatal	Velar	Glottal
Nasal		m		n					
Stop	voiceless	p	t̪		t͡ʃ	ʈ		k	
Stop	aspirated	pʰ	t̪ʰ		t͡ʃʰ	ʈʰ		kʰ	
Stop	voiced	b	d̪		d͡ʒ	ɖ		ɡ	
Stop	breathy	bʱ	d̪ʱ		d͡ʒʱ	ɖʱ		ɡʱ	
Fricative				s	ʃ				ɦ
Approximant		w		l			j		
Flap or Tap				ɾ		ɽ			

Vowels
	Front	Central	Back
Close	i iː ĩ ĩː		u uː ũ ũː
Near-close	ɪ̥		
Close-mid		ɘ ɘː ɘ̥ ɘ̃	o oː
Open-mid	ɛ ɛː		
Near-open		ɐ ɐː ɐ̃ː	
Open	a aː		

Pangwali exhibits a fossilised system of vowel harmony as other languages of the area (such as Kashmiri) do. The original conditioning vowels that caused harmony have often been lost, so the system is no longer productive.

== Grammar ==
Since Grierson's sketch of Pangwali, there has been only recently published a grammar of Pangwali written in Hindi by Binaya Sundar Nayak. Both are referenced in this article.

=== Nouns ===
Pangwali nouns have grammatical gender, with the two genders being masculine and feminine.

=== Case markers ===
Relation	Marker
Instrumental	जे jē, बलि bali
Dative	जे jē
Ablative	केंइ kēin, पुठ / पिठ puṭh/piṭh, -ए -ē
Genitive	-ए -ē

=== Numerals ===
Numeral	Pangwali	IPA
1	यक yak	/yak/
2	दुई duī	/d̪ui/
3	ट्लाय ṭlāy	/ʈai/
4	चेउर ceur	/tʃɘuɾ/
5	पंच pāṃc	/pandʒ/
6	छे : chea	/tʃʰea/
7	सत sat	/sat/
8	आठ āṭh	/aʈʰ/
9	नो nou	/nɘu/
10	दश daś	/dɘs/

== Geographical distribution ==
=== Status ===
The language is commonly called Pahari or Himachali. Some speakers may even call it a dialect of Punjabi or Dogri. The language has no official status. No efforts have been made to even correctly classify the language. The language, despite being spoken in Himachal Pradesh, shares most of its features with the neighbouring languages of the rest of the Chenab valley. According to the United Nations Education, Scientific and Cultural Organisation (UNESCO), the language is of critically endangered category, i.e. the youngest speakers of Pangwali are generally grandparents or older and they too speak it infrequently or partially.

The demand for the inclusion of 'Pahari (Himachali)' under the Eight Schedule of the Constitution, which is supposed to represent multiple Pahari languages of Himachal Pradesh, had been made in the year 2010 by the state's Vidhan Sabha. There has been no positive progress on this matter since then even when small organisations strive to save the language and demand it. Due to political interest, the language is currently recorded as a dialect of Hindi, even when having a poor mutual intelligibility with it and having a higher mutual intelligibility with other recognised languages like Dogri and other Western Pahari languages.

At the time of the Linguistic Survey of India, 3,701 speakers were estimated of Pangwali.

=== Dialects ===
Following are the dialects of the language:

1. Killar
2. Purthi
3. Sach
4. Dharwasi

Killar, being the headquarter of the Tehsil, is the dialect which is widely understood. Sach dialect is said to be the most conservative in regards to Sanskrit.

== Literature ==
Tubari Magazine is a recent effort to maintain the language. The magazine uses Devanagari Script. There are other publications which generally describe the language.

== Idioms ==
Idioms in Pangwali (Takri and Devanagari Script)
𑚞𑚫𑚌𑚦𑚭𑚪𑚯	पंगवाड़ी	Transliteration (Roman ITRANS)	Meaning
𑚢𑚌𑚮𑚤𑚮 𑚩𑚙𑚴𑚄 𑚥𑚃 𑚠𑚮𑚧𑚰𑚘	कपा हथ लाल भ़रे	magiri hatou laI bishuNa	To be worrying a lot
𑚥𑚰𑚫𑚌𑚙𑚲 𑚑𑚅 𑚊𑚱𑚘 𑚥𑚌𑚴𑚨𑚲	लुंगते जऊ कूण लगोसे	luMgate jaU kUNa lagose	Getting old when young
𑛂𑛀 𑚤𑚲𑚙𑚯 𑚏𑚴𑚤𑚲, 𑛂𑛁 𑚆𑚊𑚯𑚣𑚰 𑚢𑚭𑚥𑚸𑚲	२० रेती चोरे, २१ एकीयु मालखे	20 retI chore, 21 ekIyu mAlakhe	Theft/lies are always caught
𑚛𑚰𑚁𑚤𑚲 𑚛𑚰𑚁𑚤𑚲 𑚢𑚲𑚝𑚯 𑚏𑚰𑚘𑚯𑚘	दुआरे दुआरे मेनी चुणीण	duAre duAre menI chuNINa	To struggle a lot
