= Chaned =

Village in Himachal Pradesh, India

Chaned is a small village in Chamba district, Himachal Pradesh, India.
