= Padari, Pindra =

Padrai (a.k.a. Pindrai) is a village under Pindra Tehsil, Varanasi, Uttar Pradesh.
