= Gulabgarh Zagir =

- Village
- Country: India
- State: Punjab
- District: Kapurthala
- Tehsil: Phagwara
- Region: Majha

Government
  - Type: Panchayat raj
  - Body: Gram panchayat

Area
  - Total: 160.32 ha (396.2 acres)

Population (2011)
  - Total: 465; 226/239 ♂/♀
  - Scheduled Castes: 448; 216/232 ♂/♀
  - Total Households: 89

Languages
  - Official: Punjabi
- Time zone: UTC+5:30 (IST)
- ISO 3166 code: IN-PB
- Website: kapurthala.gov.in

Gulabgarh Zagir is a village in Phagwara in Kapurthala district of Punjab State, India. It is located 8 kilometres (5.0 mi) from sub district headquarter and 44 kilometres (27 mi) from district headquarter. The village is administrated by Sarpanch an elected representative of the village.

== Demography ==
As of 2011, The village has a total number of 89 houses and the population of 465 of which 226 are males while 239 are females. According to the report published by Census India in 2011, out of the total population of the village 448 people are from Schedule Caste and the village does not have any Schedule Tribe population so far.

== See also ==
- List of villages in India
