= Chamba district =

District of Himachal Pradesh, India

Coordinates: 32°33′16″N 76°07′26″E

- District of Himachal Pradesh
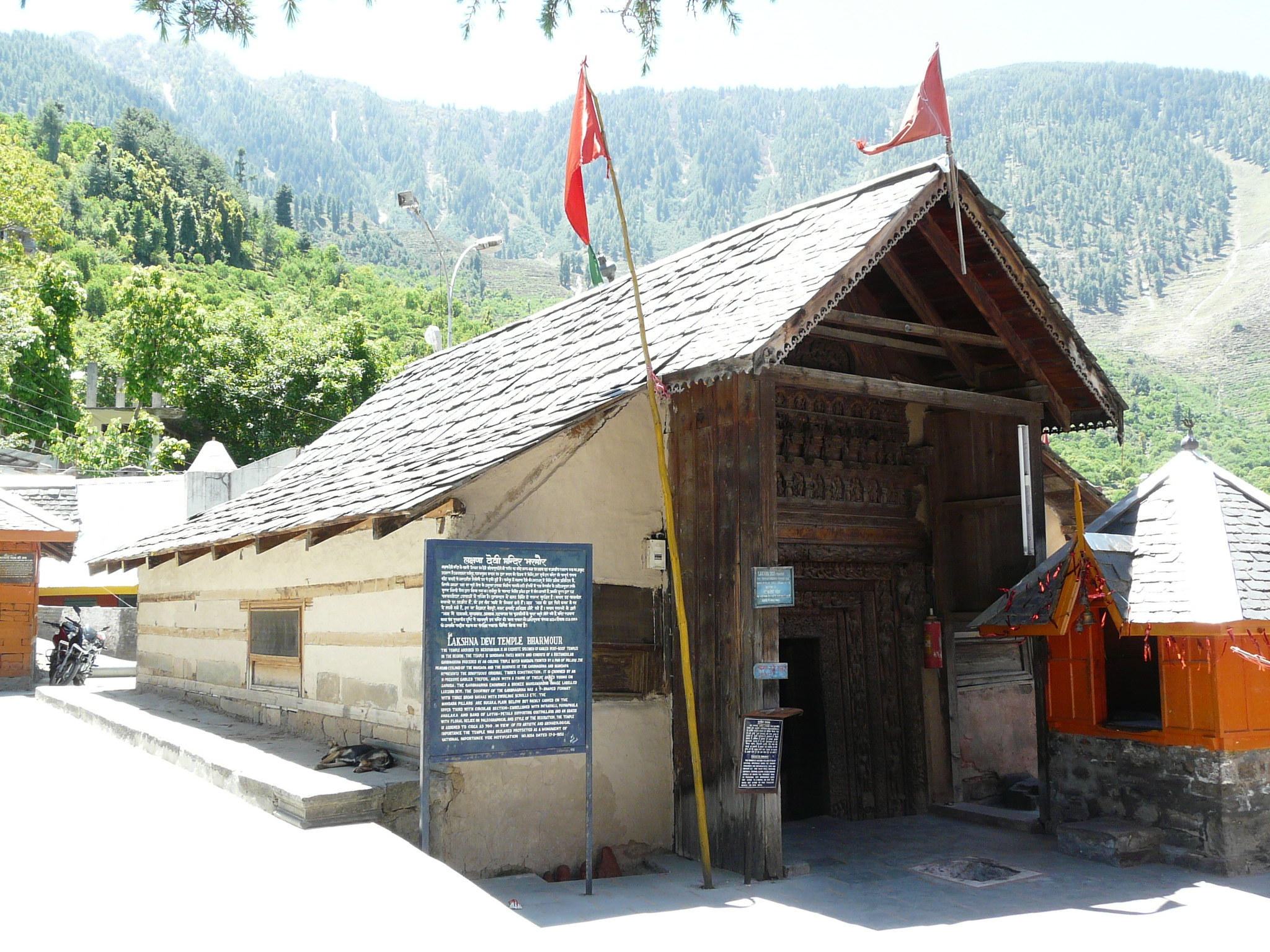
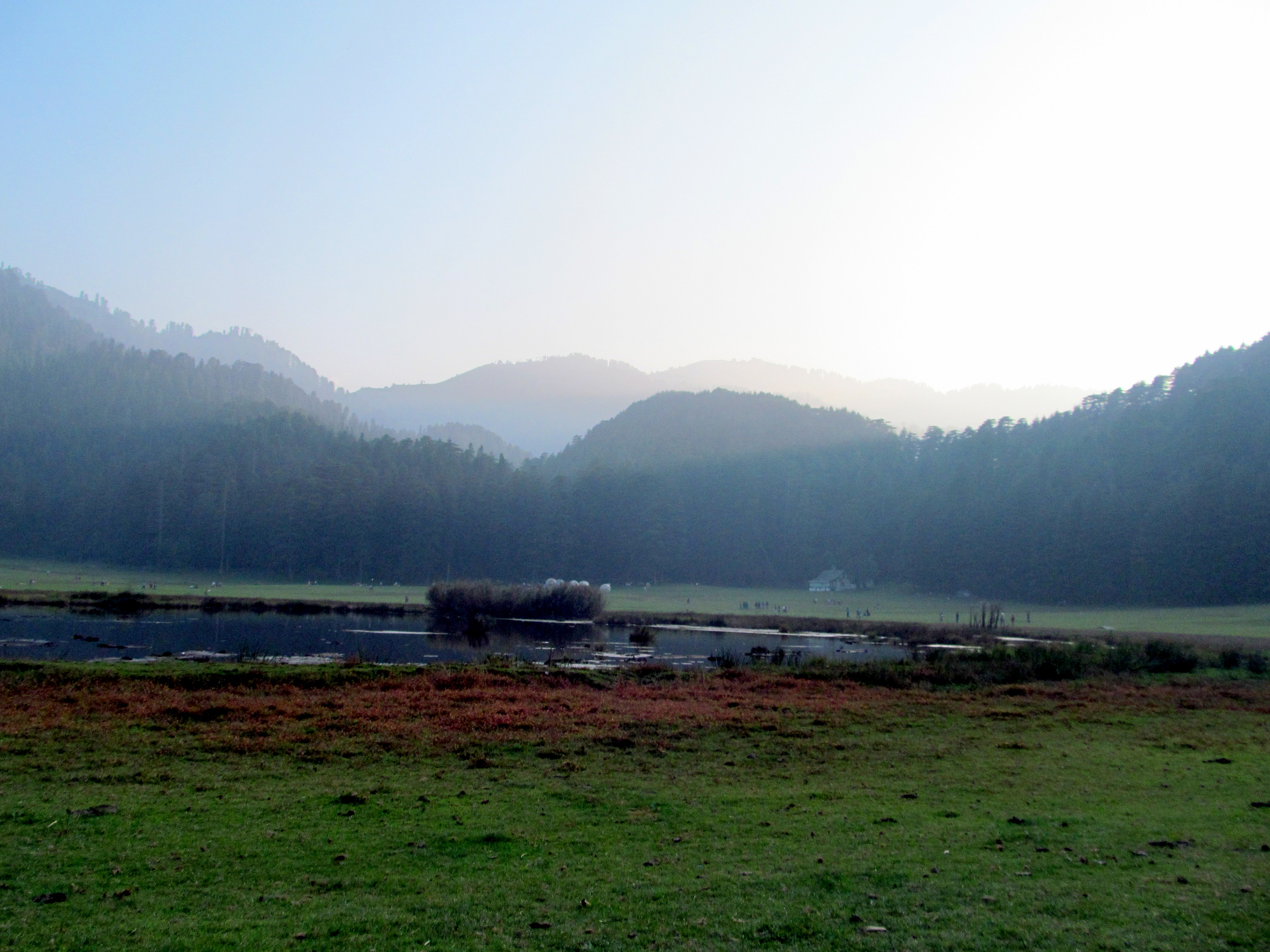
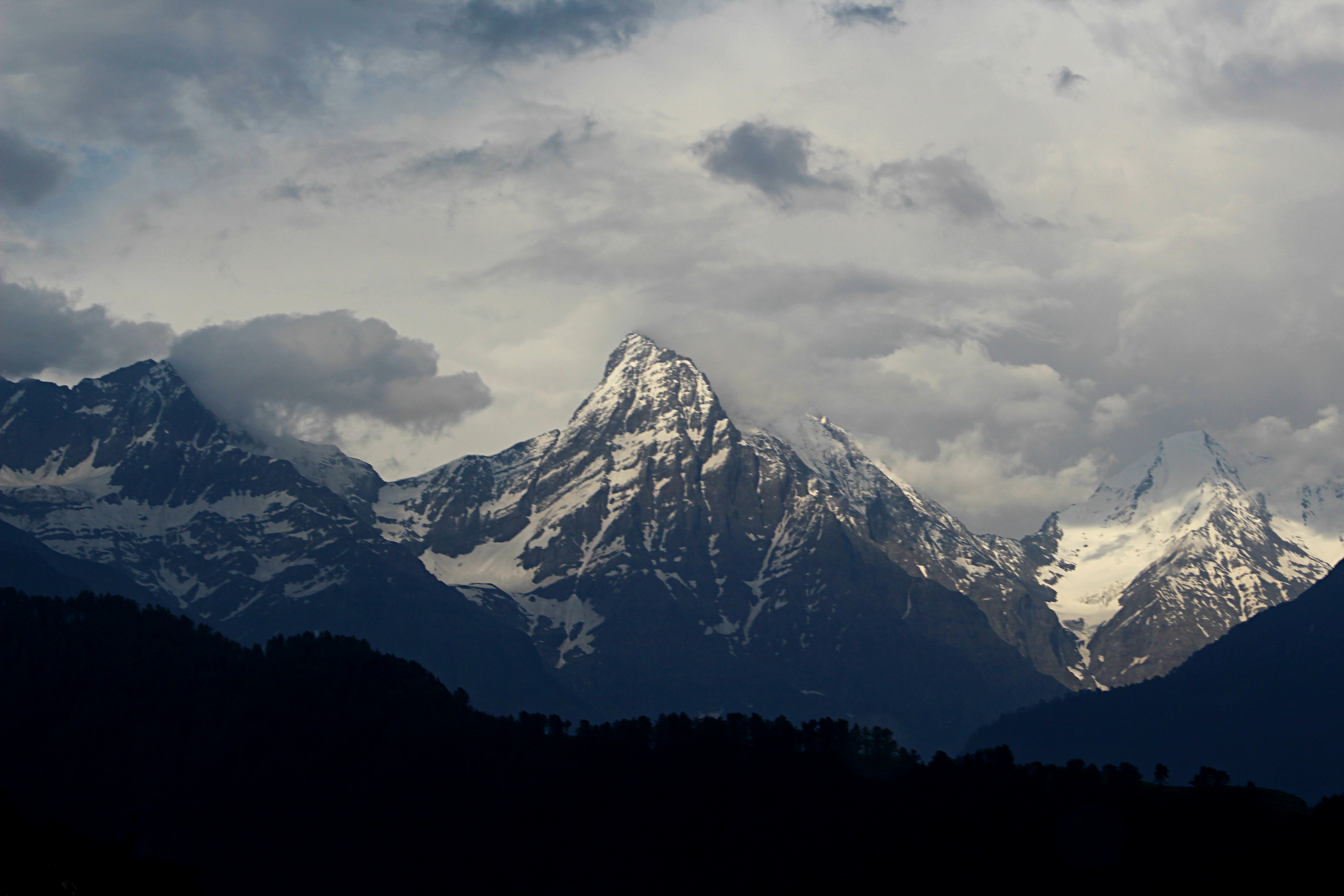
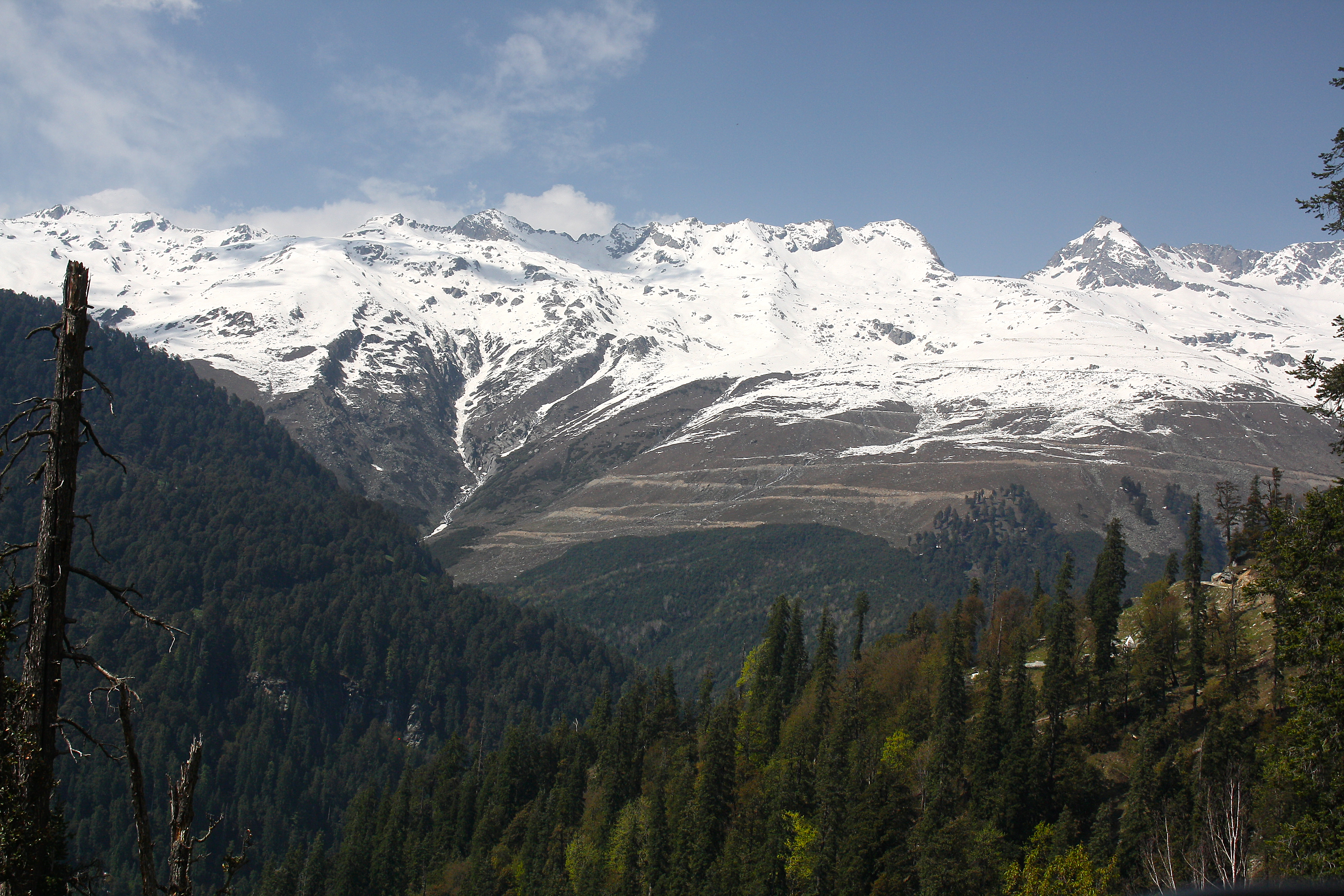
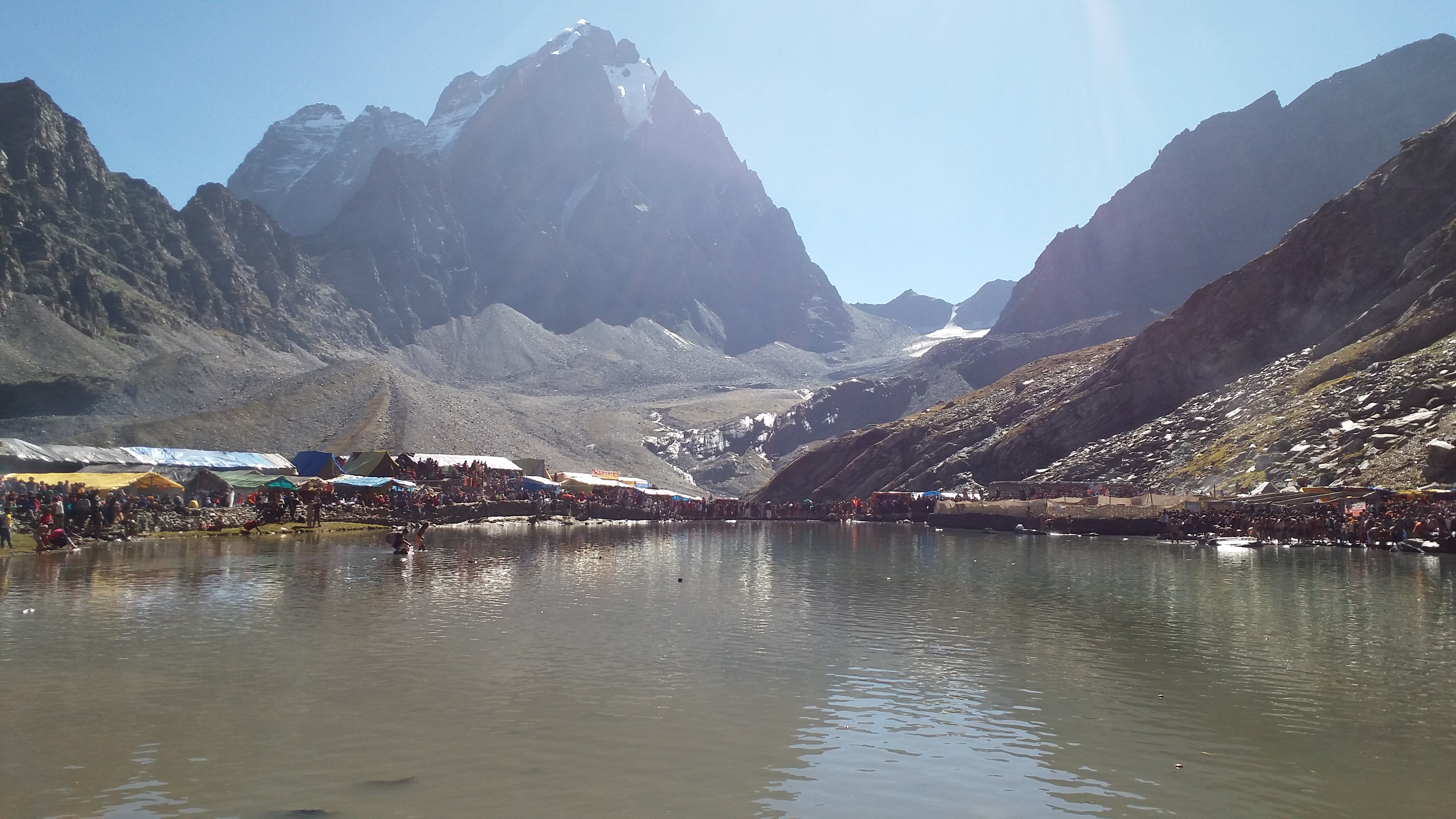
- Clockwise from top-left: Lakshana Devi Temple, Bharmour, meadow in Khajjiar, Saach pass, Manimahesh Lake, mountains near Dalhousie

- Location in Himachal Pradesh
- Country: India
- State: Himachal Pradesh
- Division: Chamba
- Headquarters: Chamba
- Tehsils: 7

Government
  - Lok Sabha constituencies: 1
  - Vidhan Sabha constituencies: 5

Area
  - Total: 6,522 km^{2} (2,518 sq mi)

Population (2011)
  - Total: 519,080
  - Density: 79.59/km^{2} (206.1/sq mi)

Languages
  - Official: Hindi
  - Regional: Chambeali; Pangwali; Bhateali; Churahi
- Time zone: UTC+05:30 (IST)
- Website: http://hpchamba.nic.in/

Chamba district is the northwestern district of Himachal Pradesh, in India, with its headquarters in Chamba town. The towns of Dalhousie, Khajjhiar and Churah Valley are popular hill stations and vacation spots for the people from the plains of northern India.

== Economy ==
In 2006 the Ministry of Panchayati Raj named Chamba one of the country's 250 most backward districts (out of a total of 640). It is one of the two districts in Himachal Pradesh currently receiving funds from the Backward Regions Grant Fund Programme (BRGF).

== Demographics ==
=== Population ===
Historical population
Year	Pop.	±% p.a.
1901	130,244	—
1911	138,943	+0.65%
1921	145,526	+0.46%
1931	150,591	+0.34%
1941	174,394	+1.48%
1951	174,537	+0.01%
1961	215,929	+2.15%
1971	251,203	+1.52%
1981	311,147	+2.16%
1991	393,286	+2.37%
2001	460,887	+1.60%
2011	519,080	+1.20%

According to the 2011 census Chamba district has a population of 519,080, roughly equal to the nation of Cape Verde. This gives it a ranking of 544th in India (out of a total of 640). The district has a population density of 80 inhabitants per square kilometre (210/sq mi) . Its population growth rate over the decade 2001–2011 was 12.58%. Chamba has a sex ratio of 989 females for every 1000 males, and a literacy rate of 73.19%. 6.96% of the population lived in urban areas. Scheduled Castes and Scheduled Tribes made up 21.52% and 26.10% of the population respectively. The Gaddis, the largest Scheduled Tribe in Himachal Pradesh, mainly live in Chamba district.

=== Religion ===
Religions in Chamba district (2011)
Religion	Per cent
Hinduism	92.43%
Islam	6.25%
Sikhism	0.53%
Other or not stated	0.79%

Religious groups in Chamba State (British Punjab province era)
Religious group	1901		1911		1921		1931		1941	
Religious group	Pop.	%	Pop.	%	Pop.	%	Pop.	%	Pop.	%
Hinduism (Note: 1931-1941: Including Ad-Dharmis)	119,327	93.35%	126,269	92.93%	130,489	91.98%	135,254	92.09%	155,910	92.3%
Islam	8,332	6.52%	8,750	6.44%	10,529	7.42%	10,839	7.38%	12,318	7.29%
Sikhism	80	0.06%	141	0.1%	242	0.17%	112	0.08%	107	0.06%
Christianity	70	0.05%	81	0.06%	63	0.04%	94	0.06%	190	0.11%
Buddhism	22	0.02%	627	0.46%	541	0.38%	568	0.39%	383	0.23%
Jainism	3	0%	5	0%	3	0%	3	0%	0	0%
Zoroastrianism	0	0%	0	0%	0	0%	0	0%	0	0%
Judaism	0	0%	0	0%	0	0%	0	0%	0	0%
Others	0	0%	0	0%	0	0%	0	0%	0	0%
Total population	127,834	100%	135,873	100%	141,867	100%	146,870	100%	168,908	100%
Note: British Punjab province era district borders are not an exact match in the present-day due to various bifurcations to district borders — which since created new districts — throughout the historic Punjab Province region during the post-independence era that have taken into account population increases.

=== Languages ===
Languages of Chamba district (2011)
1. Pahari (24.0%)
2. Chambeali (23.2%)
3. Gaddi (21.8%)
4. Churahi (14.4%)
5. Pangwali (3.48%)
6. Bhateali (2.91%)
7. Hindi (2.91%)
8. Gujari (1.88%)
9. Kashmiri (1.31%)
10. Punjabi (1.11%)
11. Others (2.93%)

The majority of the people of the district are native speakers of languages in the Himachali group. These primarily include Chambeali (the first language reported by 23% of the population in the 2011 census), Gaddi or Bharmauri (22%), Churahi (14%), Pangwali (3.5%) and Bhateali (2.9%). Other languages spoken are Hindi (2.9%), Gujari (1.9%), Kashmiri (1.3%) and Punjabi (1.1%).

== Politics ==
Constituency		Party	MLA	Remark
No.	Name	Party	MLA	Remark
1	Churah (SC)	BJP	Hans Raj	
2	Bharmour (ST)	BJP	Janak Raj	
3	Chamba	INC	Neeraj Nayar	
4	Dalhousie	BJP	D S Thakur	
5	Bhattiyat	INC	Kuldeep Singh Pathania	Speaker

== Education ==
=== Schools ===
- Minority School Juwans Muslim Minority Educational Center Juwans Kihar district Chamba,

== Interesting places ==
- Laxmi Narayan Temple : It is the most famous tourist attraction place in Chamba. There are six temples dedicated to Lord Shiva and Lord Vishnu. Three temples are dedicated to Lord Vishnu, and another three to Lord Shiva.
- Gandhi Gate : The Viceroy of British Government Lord Curzon received a warm welcome by a bright orange gateway built in 1900, known as Gandhi gate. It is the main gateway of Chamba.

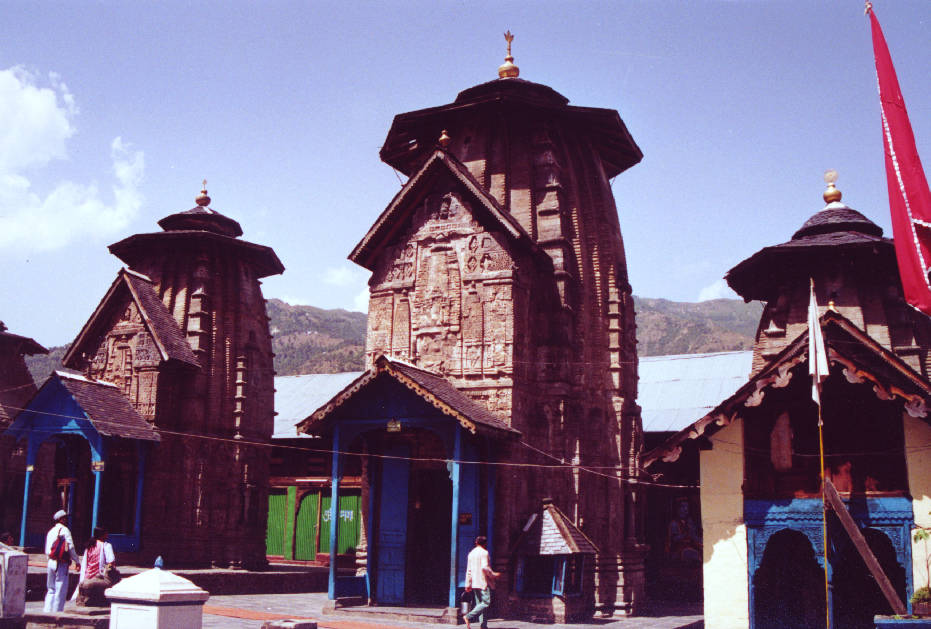
Laxmi Narayan Temple of Chamba

A yet another place of interest in Chamba town is the Bhuri Singh Museum at Chamba which came into existence on 14 September 1908. It is named after Raja Bhuri Singh who ruled Chamba from 1904 to 1919. Bhuri Singh donated his family collection of paintings to the museum. The embroidered Chamba-Rumals are related in style since their drawings were made by pahari painters though the embroidery was done by the household ladies.

Salooni is 56 km from Chamba.

Khajjiar is mini Switzerland in Chamba. Bhalei Mata Temple is famous in Chamba. It is 35 km from Chamba. Chhudra is 25 km from Chamba.

=== Villages ===
- Chaned

== Notable residents ==
Chamba district is represented in Lok Sabha by the Member of Parliament elected from Kangra (Lok Sabha constituency). Earlier it is represented for first 4 elections to Lok Sabha as member elected from Chamba (Lok Sabha constituency). The MP elected from Chamba seat were A. R Sewal in 1952, Padam Dev in 1957, Chattar Singh in 1962 and Vikram Chand Mahajan in 1967.
