= Paddar =

- Sub-division
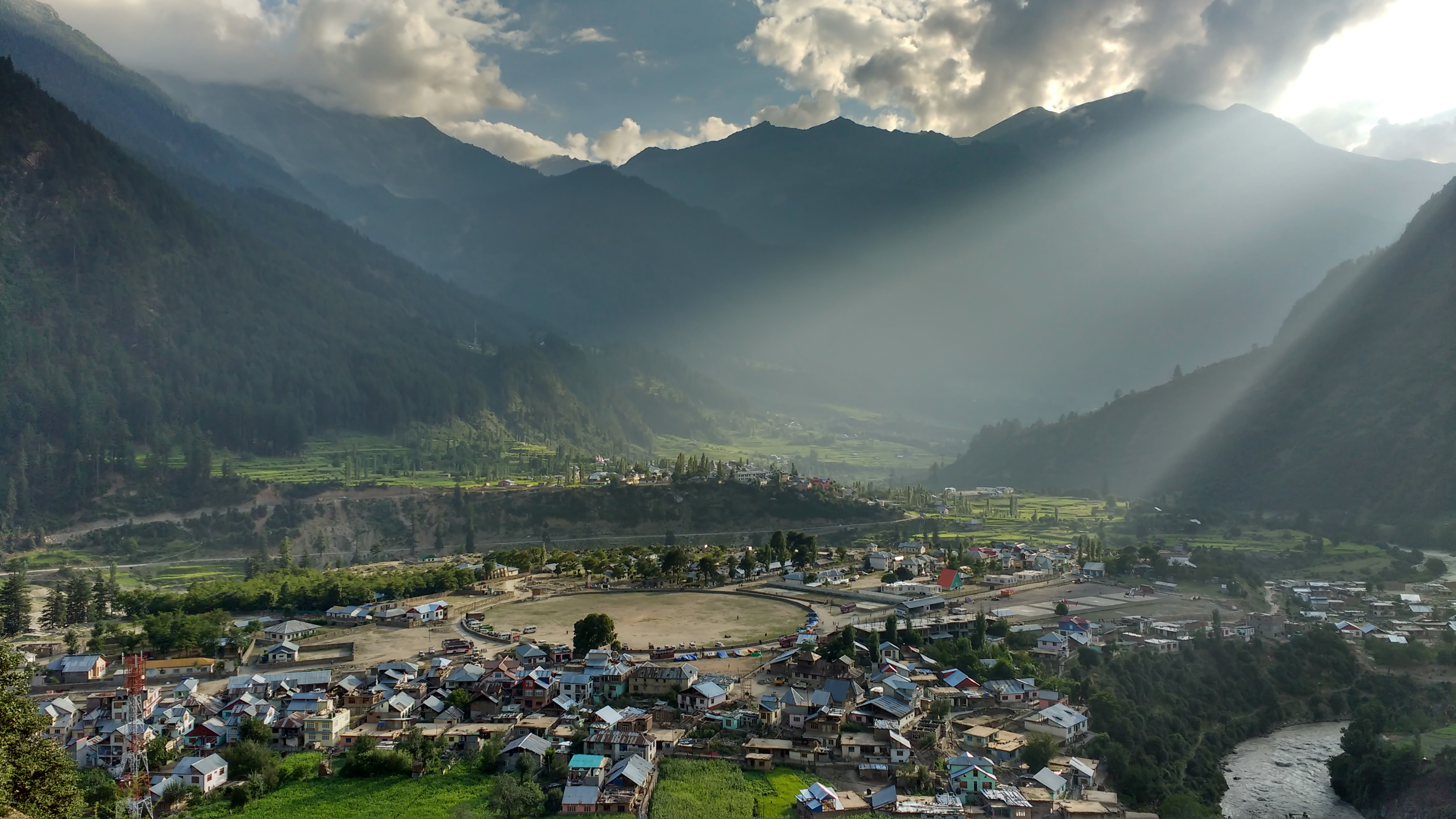
- View of Gulabgarh Town and Paddar Valley

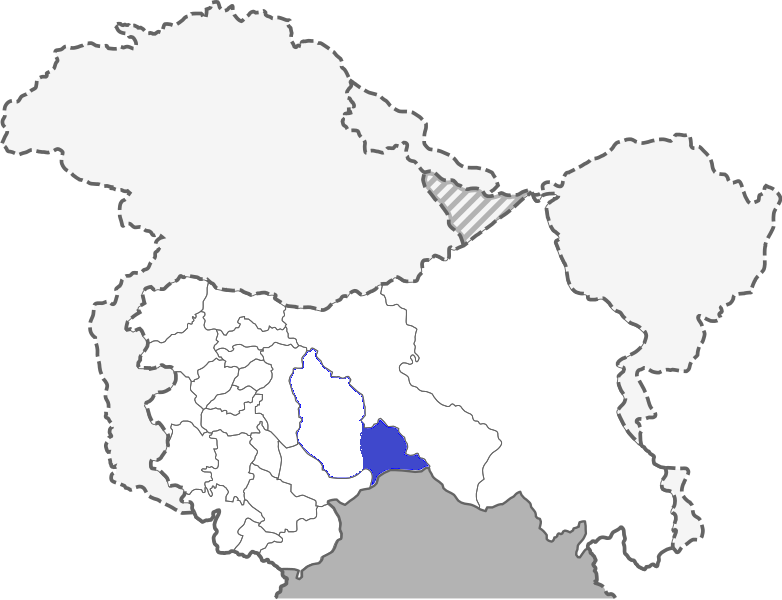
- Location of Paddar Sub-District, J&K, India
- Coordinates: 33.155671°N 76.092911°E
- Country: India
- Union Territory: Jammu & Kashmir
- Division: Jammu
- District: Kishtwar
- Named for: Sapphire mine
- Headquarters: Gulabgarh, Paddar

Population (2011)
  - Total: 21,548

Society
  - Languages: Padri, Pangwali, Hindi, Ladakhi, Kishtwari, Urdu
- Time zone: UTC+5:30 (IST)
- PIN: 182204
- Website: http://www.paddar.com

Paddar, also spelled Padar (Hindi: pāḍar), is a sub-district and remote valley in the Kishtwar district of the union territory of Jammu and Kashmir, India. It falls in the Jammu division. It consists of two tehsils: Machail and Atholi Paddar. The valley covers the entire southeastern portion of the Kishtwar district. It borders Zanskar (Ladakh) in the north and east, Pangi (Himachal Pradesh) in the south and the rest of Jammu and Kashmir in the west. The valley is known for its Sapphire mines. It lies along the Chenab river in the Great Himalayas. Paddar is one of the most remote regions of Jammu and Kashmir. There are a number of small valleys within Paddar, such as Machail, Gandhari, Kabban, Ongai, Bhuzunu, Barnaj, Bhuzas, Kijai Nallah, Ishtiyari, Tiyari and Dharlang, among others.

== History ==
It is unclear when humans first arrived in Paddar. Some theories suggest it was first settled in the 8th century by people from Kashmir, and the northwestern region of the subcontinent (KPK or Eastern Afghanistan). They could be the descendants of ancient White Huns or Scythians. The area is inhabited mostly by the Thakurs and Pandits (Brahmins). There is also an interesting thing to know many villages in the region have name that include Kashmiri surnames. E.g Bhatwas- literally translating to the Place or Abode of Bhats Ganjuwas- the Abode of Ganjus

Paddar was under the rule of the Kashmiri Empire for centuries. Various manuscripts written in Sharada script have been found in the region. But most of the period of the history it remained under self rule because it was a difficult region to be accessible. At local level, the area were headed by local Ranas. Each Rana usually controlled one to three villages, often fighting with other Ranas for control of land. By the mid-17th century, Rana Sheetal Singh controlled the valley, being headquartered at Leondi village. Sheetal Singh was defeated in an ambush by the Raja of Chamba and his forces, and Paddar fell into the hands of Chamba rulers. After Chatur Singh's reign, the Rajas of Chamba exercised their sovereignty over Padder for six generations. The area enjoyed peace and prosperity thereafter. In the spring of 1836 A.D., Zorawar Singh took up arms against the Chamba forces and won, causing Paddar to be annexed to Kishtwar. Due to its history under Chamaba rule, Paddar has a strong relationship with Himachal Pradesh in terms of culture and history.

The residents of ancient Paddar were primarily serpent worshipers. However, they observed other Hindu rites and rituals as well. Besides Hindus, Muslims and Buddhists also settled in the valley. The Buddhists were spread in the upper reaches of the Machail, Kaban, and Gandhari valleys and in the town of Gulabgarh.The first Muslims came to Paddar during the period of the Raja Shantar Kantar from Chamba. The descendants of those Muslims still live in Atholi and Kijai.

== Culture ==
Paddar has an extensive cultural history.

=== Religion ===
The majority of Padderi belong to the Hindu community, but their traditions and rituals are very different from mainstream Hinduism. They follow a unique Shiva-Shakti tradition which is similar to Kashmir Shaivism. They worship the nature and its sacred elements, e.g Zehryun devta or Megh raj, who is the god of Clouds and snow (Lord Indra), or Jwala mata, the god of fire, warmth and prosperity. Nāgas i.e snake gods, are also an object of worship. Temples of various Nag devtas, or Serpent Gods, are still visible, and adorned with wood carvings of snakes of all kinds. The goddess Parvati, i.e Shakti, is worshipped in different forms, such as Kali, Chandi, Sheetla devi, etc. Different festivals are organized for their local deities, during which customary dances and rituals are performed. They use dhoons and beinch (flute) to play ragad of devi-devtas.

In every household, three important ceremonies are held for every individual: Bishtyan (Yagyopavit) irrespective of their castes, Byah (Marriage), and last rites.

=== Castes and Community ===
The traditional life in the region is centered on community, religion and agriculture. Community plays an important role in the life of every individual, from every small family function to festivals.

Unlike other regions of North India, the caste system is somewhat weak in the Paddar Valley. It is said that the Kashmir valley was primarily inhabited by Brahmins, but in time they adopted agriculture and warfare and became ancestors of the present-day Rana or Thakur community. Due to this, there is no difference in the culture, practices and rituals of Brahmins and Thakurs. It is quite unique to the region that every individual irrespective of their caste still performs the Yagyopavit ceremony and follows brahminical rituals. This is why the Thakur community of this region is quite distinctive from the Rajputs.

An important theory about the origin of this culture is that once, the Kashmir valley was inhabited mostly by the Nagas and the Pishacha tribes, but that after the advent of Vedic culture, they left the region. The pishachas are the ancestors of the present day Shina and Batli tribes; while the Nagas, who were worshipped serpents, migrated south of Kashmir i.e in the present-day Chenab Valley. Today still, various serpent gods are worshipped there. Naga deities like the Vasuki nag, Kausar nag, or Shesh nag, which are some of the primary deities of the region, trace their origin from Kashmir valley.

=== Music and dance ===
Due to isolation from the rest of the world, the region has special and unique dance forms that developed gradually.

Local songs are called gheet. Sugil is a unique form of singing in which the words are sung slowly; the word is also generally used to describe an event.

The most famous dance form of the region is kharzath. It is similar to the Kud dance of the Jammu region, which is performed on special occasions and in temples.

Gurhey is a dance performed by women. They sing songs while holding each others' hand, and move slowly by matching footsteps. It is similar to Kashmir's rauf dance.

=== Clothing ===
In order to adapt to the cold and harsh climate of the region, residents wear woolen garments all year round. The women wear shalwar kameez or kamir-suthan inside, and cover it with a light but heat-insulating woolen shawl called a chador, which is draped in a unique manner. Women also wear special caps called zuji on their heads. In older times, they additionally used to wear heavy silver jewellery, which included head jewellery, big ear rings and nose pins, and heavy silver necklaces.

The men wear a loose long kurta-like tunic called a kamïr, or kamri, with a lower churidar which is tight at the bottom but loose above the knees. The other dress for men is Choga which is a long tunic flary at the bottom. They often wear a piece of wool for a belt, called a mazerad.

The traditional dress of Pangwali/Padderi women consists of a Chador (often referred as Pardah) which a thin wollen shawl . The head wear is called Zuji/Joji is made with delicate embroidery and a bottom wear called Chalan/Suthan.

== Demographics ==
Religion in Paddar (2011)
1. Hinduism (83.6%)
2. Buddhism (9.50%)
3. Islam (6.80%)
4. Others (0.10%)

Hinduism is the largest religion in Paddar and is followed by around 83.63% of the population. Other significant religions are Buddhism (9.46%) and Islam (6.84%).

Upper caste Hindu Communities i.e Thakurs and Pandits (Brahmins) form the overwhelming majority of the population with a significant minority of other castes such as Dom, Kumhar, Watal etc.

Languages of Paddar (2011)
1. Padri (79.6%)
2. Ladakhi (8.90%)
3. Kashmiri (5.90%)
4. Other (5.60%)

The majority of the population (nearly 80%) speaks Padri as a first language. Pangwali and Kishtwari are also spoken in the valley. The Hindus in the valley speak the languages listed above. The Buddhist community speaks Bhoti. The Buddhist population of the valley is ethnically close to Lahaul, Himachal Pradesh and Ladakh. The Muslim population of the valley primarily speaks Kashmiri.

== Villages ==
- Karthai is among the most accessible villages in Paddar. The village lies in green paddy fields, with the river Chenab on one side and dense forest on the other. It is 58 km from the district capital and is a cultural centre.
- Gulabgarh is the sub-divisional headquarter and commercial center of Paddar and a hub for the area's economic activities. It has a sizeable market area and a TRC (Tourist Reception Area). Transport services run from here to Kishtwar town and Pangi. It also hosts local cricket tournaments. Besides for its economy and recreational opportunities, Gulabgarh also hosts many government offices, J&K Bank, a police station and rest houses.

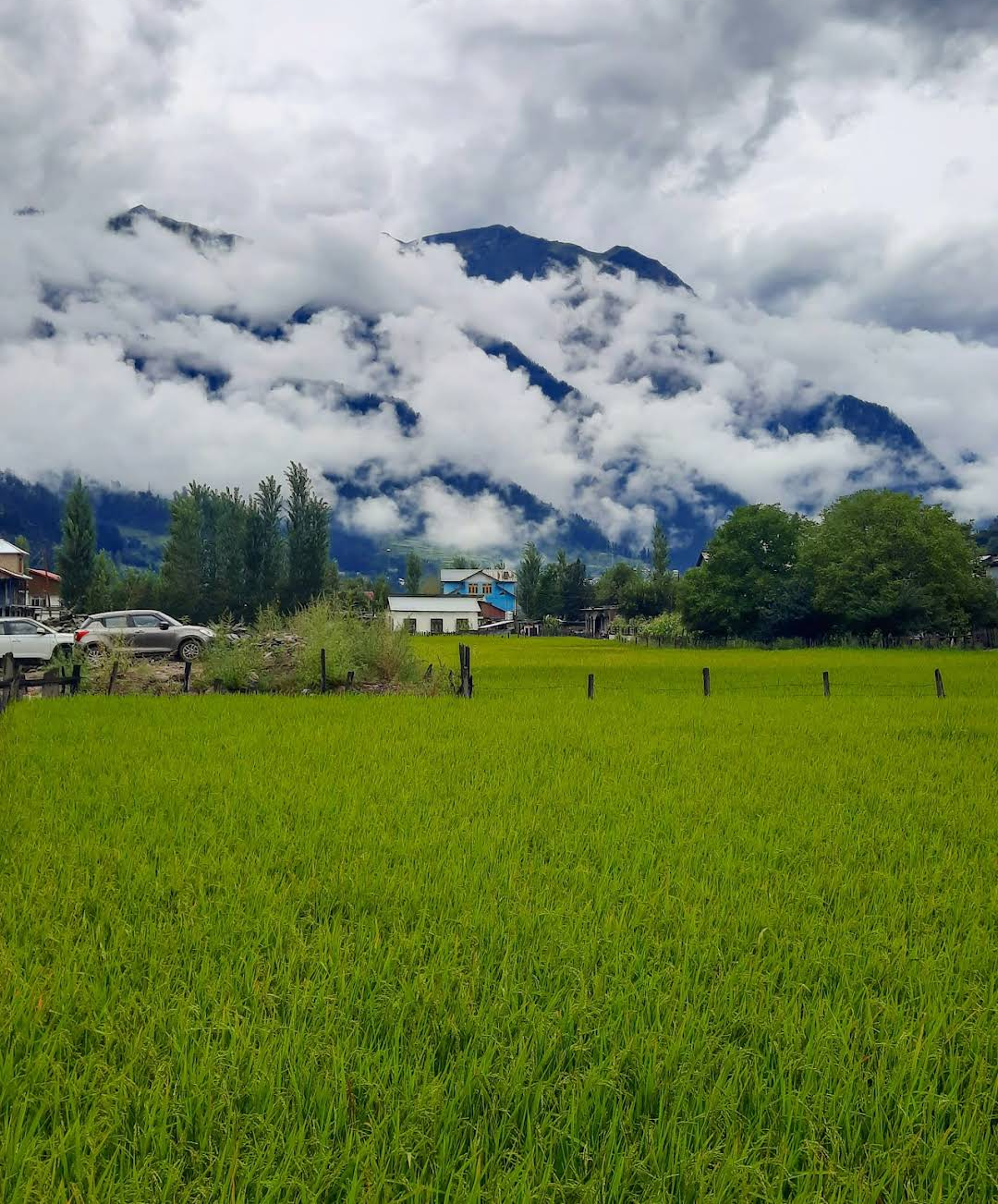
Atholi

- Atholi is the administrative capital. It contains many sub-district level offices including the Atholi Tehsildar's office, Munsiff Camp Atholi, the Paddar Forest Range Office, the Paddar ZEO office, the Atholi Tehsil Library, the Atholi fire station and post office, and the Paddar sub-district hospital. It is also known for a scenic spot called Pathaal and a water mill (known locally as Ghiraat) run by a waterfall in the village., AEE office Jal Shakti Vibhaag, Higher Secondary School, Girl's High School and Degree college are other significant establishments in the town.
- Tatta Pani is known for its natural Hot spring.There is a waterfall 'Hanswar Fall'.Sheshnag temple is also situated here.It also said that the of(kund) Hot Spring gives relief to joints pain.
- Sohal is used by off-roaders and as a base camp when travelling to Chittoo, Kabban and Ongayee villages.
  The Kabban village is located along the Sohal/Kabban Nala. Then Ungaie Village along the Ungaie Nala. The Chenab river runs through the villages of Tiyari, Chitto, and Ishtyari.

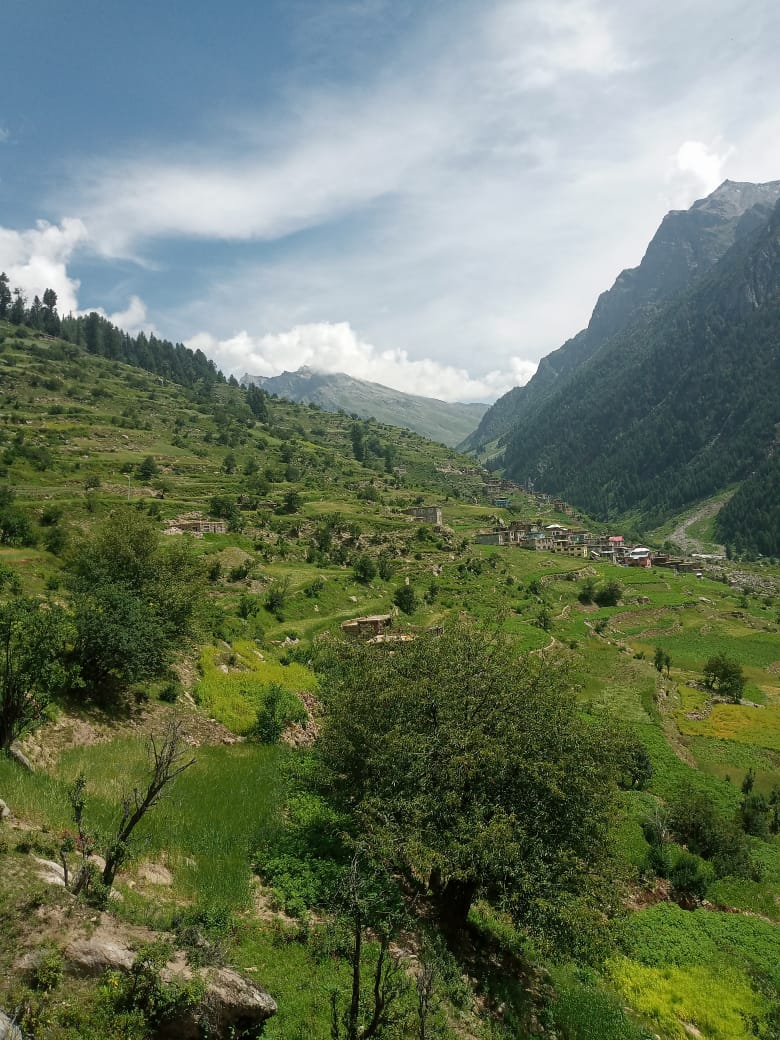

- Gandhari is visited by mountaineers, hikers, and climbers, and is known for green pastures. Its first village, Bhatwas, is about 30 km from Gulabgarh, with 25 km accessible with motor vehicles. The rest can only be travelled by foot. The trek route from here continues to Machail in Paddar, Zanskar in Ladakh, and Pangi. As per Sanskrit language, Gandhari means "girl from Gandhara", and is a prominent character in the Mahabharata, an Indian epic. Gandhari was a princess in Gandhara and the wife of Dhritrashtra, the blind king of Hastinapura. She was the mother of a hundred sons, the Kauravas.
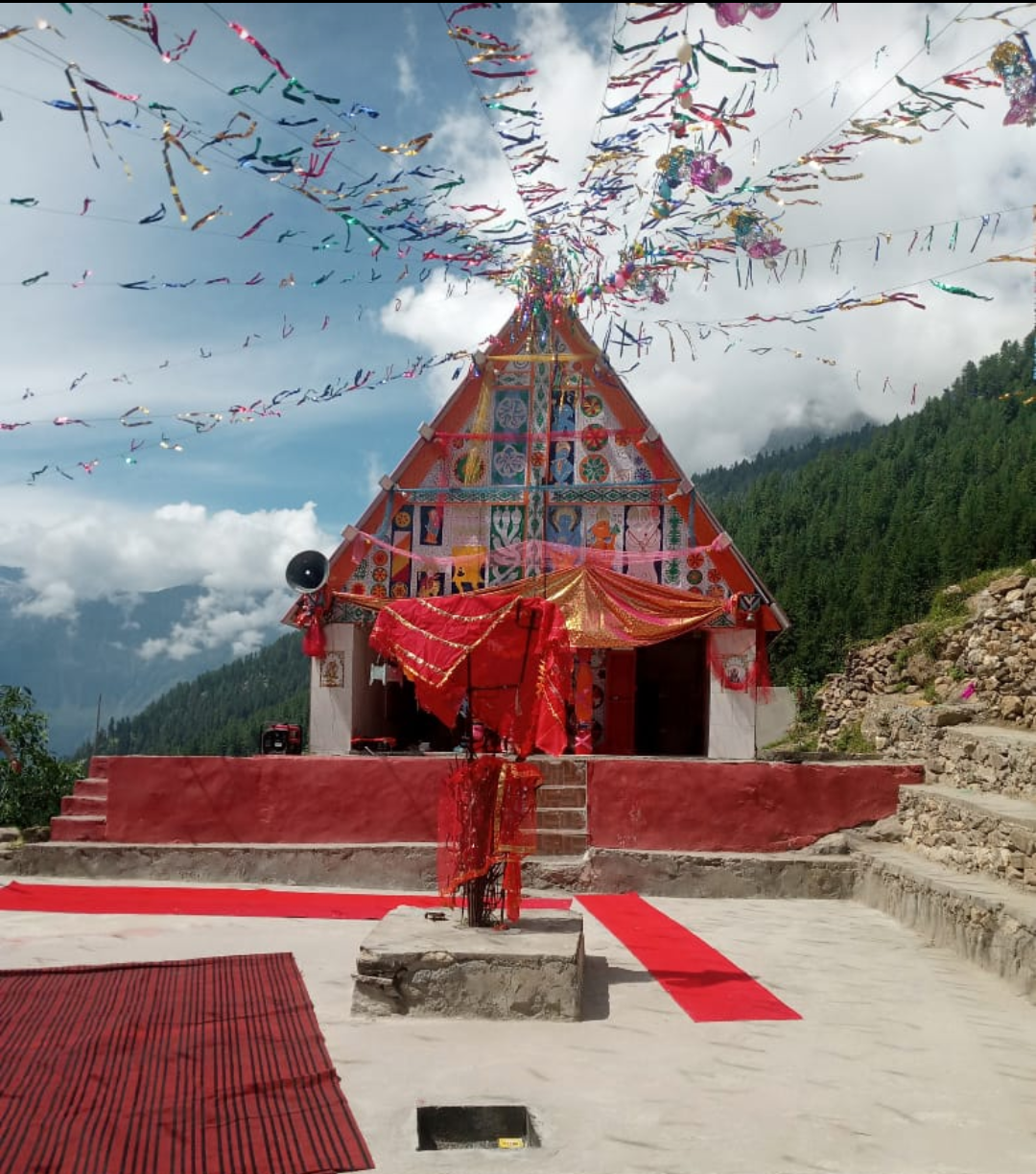
  Chandi Mata Devi Mandir
  Maa Chandi's holy shrine, Shiva temple, Nag temple, and Buddhist Gompa Monastery are also located in the village. It is a popular spot for picnicking, touring, and adventuring, and is located approximately 9000 feet above sea level.
- Haloti and Hangoo are the nearest revenue villages to the Machail Mata shrine. The majority of the residents in these two villages are Buddhists. This villages are known for yaks, which are found only in this area after Ladakh. These domesticated yaks are raised to provide milk and to plough fields for agriculture. Many Buddhist monasteries are also found here.
- Machail is known for the Chandi Mata Temple and the annual Machail Yatra festival, during which lakhs of pilgrims visit the temple. Machail has recently been granted the status of tehsil.

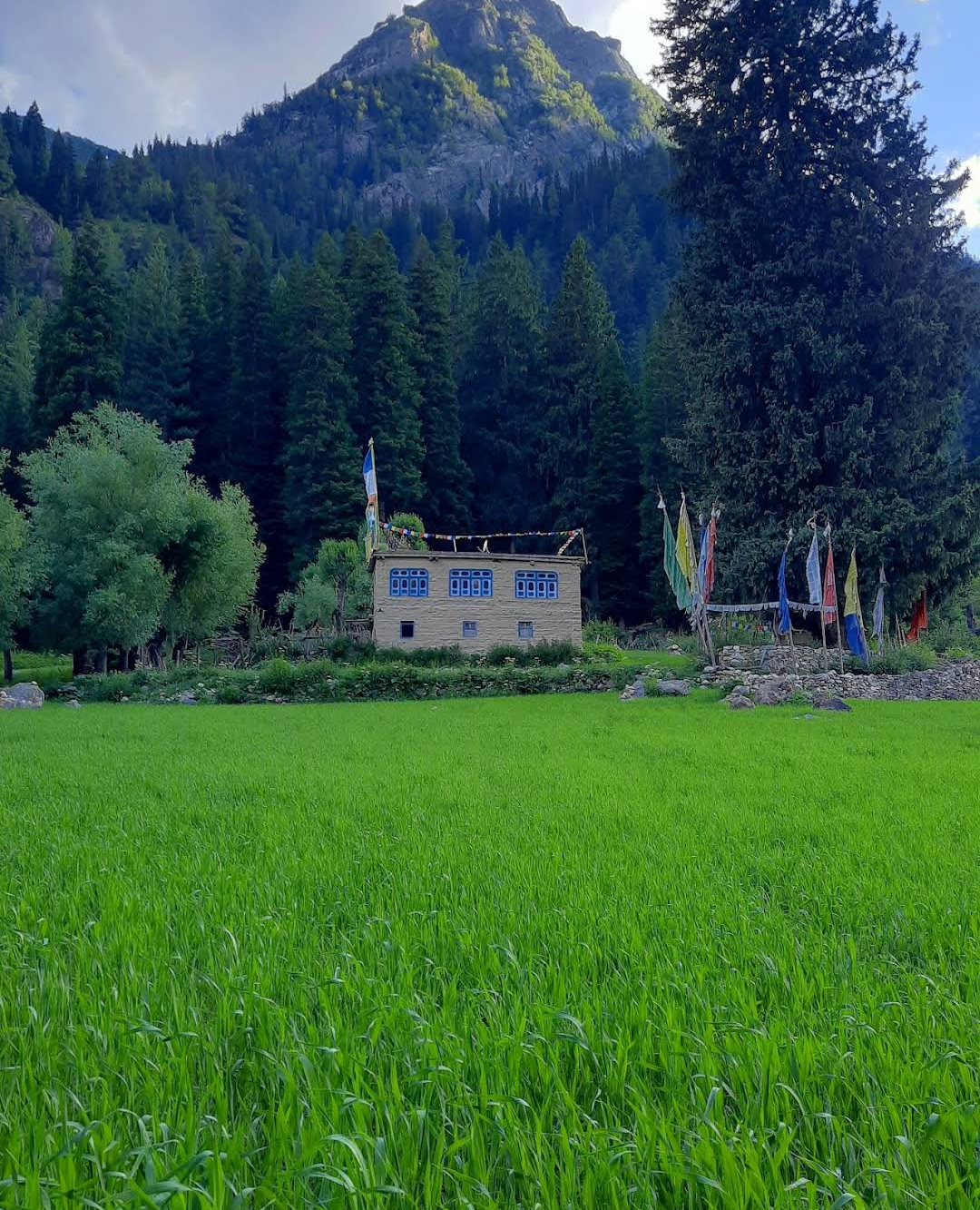
Buddhist village of Padder

- Lossani is the second closest revenue village to Machail's Chandi Mata Mandir. The majority of the settlements here are part of the Buddhist community. They are known for yaks and horses, which are used for the same purposes as in Haloti and Hangoo. Lossani is the second largest village in Paddar.

== Festivals ==
Some notable festivals celebrated in Paddar are :

- Shivratri (Sheraeth): Shivratri, locally known as Sheraeth, is the most famous and significant festival of the Padder Valley. It is celebrated with great enthusiasm and devotion, involving numerous rituals, beliefs, and deep spirituality.The festival lasts for four days.The first two days are called Rekh and Kandey. According to local belief, these are the days when demons, spirits, and witches celebrate the festival. In the morning, after thoroughly cleaning and purifying their homes, people cover their doors and windows with thorns and leaves. In the evening, when no one remains outside, a rekha (white line) is drawn across the main entrance to prevent any negative energy from entering the house. People also draw portraits of demons on their rooftops and stay indoors all night, praying and playing kaudi, as it is believed that Lord Shiva and Goddess Parvati loved this game. The elders of the family narrate stories of gods, demons, and Shivratri traditions to the younger generation.The third day, known as Narath, is marked by sacrifices made in households. Special meals are prepared for the evening, and cooking mutton is considered an important custom.The final day, called Vrath, is observed with fasting by the men of the family. Various pujas and rituals are performed, and offerings such as walnuts, dry fruits, and kheer are distributed as prasad. Snowfall on this day is regarded as an auspicious sign, symbolizing a prosperous harvest for the year ahead.
- Kanchaeth :- Gauri tritya which is locally known as Kanchaeth, is a Hindu festival primarily celebrated in the Chenab valley region of Jammu and Kashmir, particularly in Doda, Kishtwar, and Ramban districts. It commemorates the marriage of Lord Shiva and Goddess Parvati. Women observe a day-long fast, pray for the long life and well-being of their husbands, and break their fast with non-vegetarian delicacies, a unique aspect of this festival.
- Mela Magh is an annual celebration lasting three days in the village of Ligri. Thousands of people from villages in the surrounding area take part. The disciples (chelas) of gods and goddesses, wearing local woollen (pattu) dresses and locally made grass shoes, perform specific religious dances. The third day of the celebration is marked by a visit to the holy lack in the upper reaches of Munhal Dhaar.
- Zaagra is a celebration where a huge fire is lit in front of a temple of god/goddess during the night and the chelas (disciples), along with the other locals, dance around the fire to the music of dhols and flutes.
- Losar is the Tibetan New Year, which is celebrated mostly by the Buddhist communities. Households observe Losar together. People drink the local brew Chhaang and celebrate for weeks. Losar generally occurs in the months of January and February.
- Naghoi Mela is celebrated in Gandhari in the middle of August every year. People across Paddar and Pangi (Himachal Pradesh) come here to celebrate the festival at the Chandi Mata Mandir Gandhari. It is a festival of two Days. This festival is celebrated for three days. It is also celebrated in villages of Pallali and Machail.
- Cheti is celebrated in Gandhari, Pallali and Machail amidst heavy snowfall. It is celebrated with great pomp. People take greetings to each other's homes. This festival is an opportunity for the people who are locked in the snow to meet each other to celebrate the winters.
- Mithyaag is celebrated to mark the onset of spring and to pray to Mother Earth for better crop yields. People gather at a holy sites and dance around the sacred weapons of the gods.
- Chandi Yatra is an annual pilgrimage to a shrine dedicated to the goddess Durga, popularly known as Machail Mata, located in the village of Machel. Thousands of people, mainly from the Jammu region, visit the shrine every August. It takes approximately ten hours to travel from Jammu to the base camp Gulabgarh by road, after which a 32 km foot journey begins. It usually takes two days to reach the shrine on foot. There are many villages on the way where one can stay for the night. The chaddi takes three days to reach Machail. Many people organize roadside 'langars' (free food points) on the way to the Gulabgarh. The government of Jammu and Kashmir also arranges basic amenities for the pilgrims.
- Awaans is a festival in which a huge fire is lit in front of a temple in Karthie. All the religious pujaris (priests) from nearby villages come wearing traditional dress and are welcomed by local villagers. The festival happens once every three years, attracting people from across Paddar. Participants enjoy group dances and singing. This festival is a symbol of the rich and diverse culture of Paddar, which embraces love and respect for people irrespective of caste or colour.
- Uzzan is a festival of religious Sentiments. It is celebrated all over the valley it starts from remote village 'chitto' and ends in the village of 'Jar' 9 mens from chitto comes to 'tatapani' and stay at Sh.Balwan ji house main motive was to clean the kund situated in tatapani. After cleaning they went to different houses for biksha, eat rangai and return to chitto.

== Transport ==
=== Air ===
The closest airports to Paddar are Jammu Airport and Srinagar International Airport, which are 280 and 270 km away, respectively. The nearest helipad is located in Gulabgarh.

=== Rail ===
There is no railway station in Paddar. The nearest railway station is the Udhampur railway station, which is 212 km away.

=== Road ===
Paddar Valley is connected to the rest of India by the Keylong-Tandi-Killar-Gulabgarh-Kishtwar road.
