= Padari, Iran =

Padri پدری
- Village
- Location within Iran
- Coordinates: 27°48′47″N 52°17′19″E
- Country: Iran
- Province: Bushehr
- County: Jam
- Bakhsh: Central
- Rural District: Jam

Population (2006)
  - Total: 21
- Time zone: UTC+3:30 (IRST)
  - Summer (DST): UTC+4:30 (IRDT)

Padri (Persian: پدری, also Romanized as Padarī and Padrī; also known as Pardī) is a village in Jam Rural District, in the Central District of Jam County, Bushehr Province, Iran. At the 2006 census, its population was 21, in 4 families.
