= Shoqa =

Long-sleeved robe

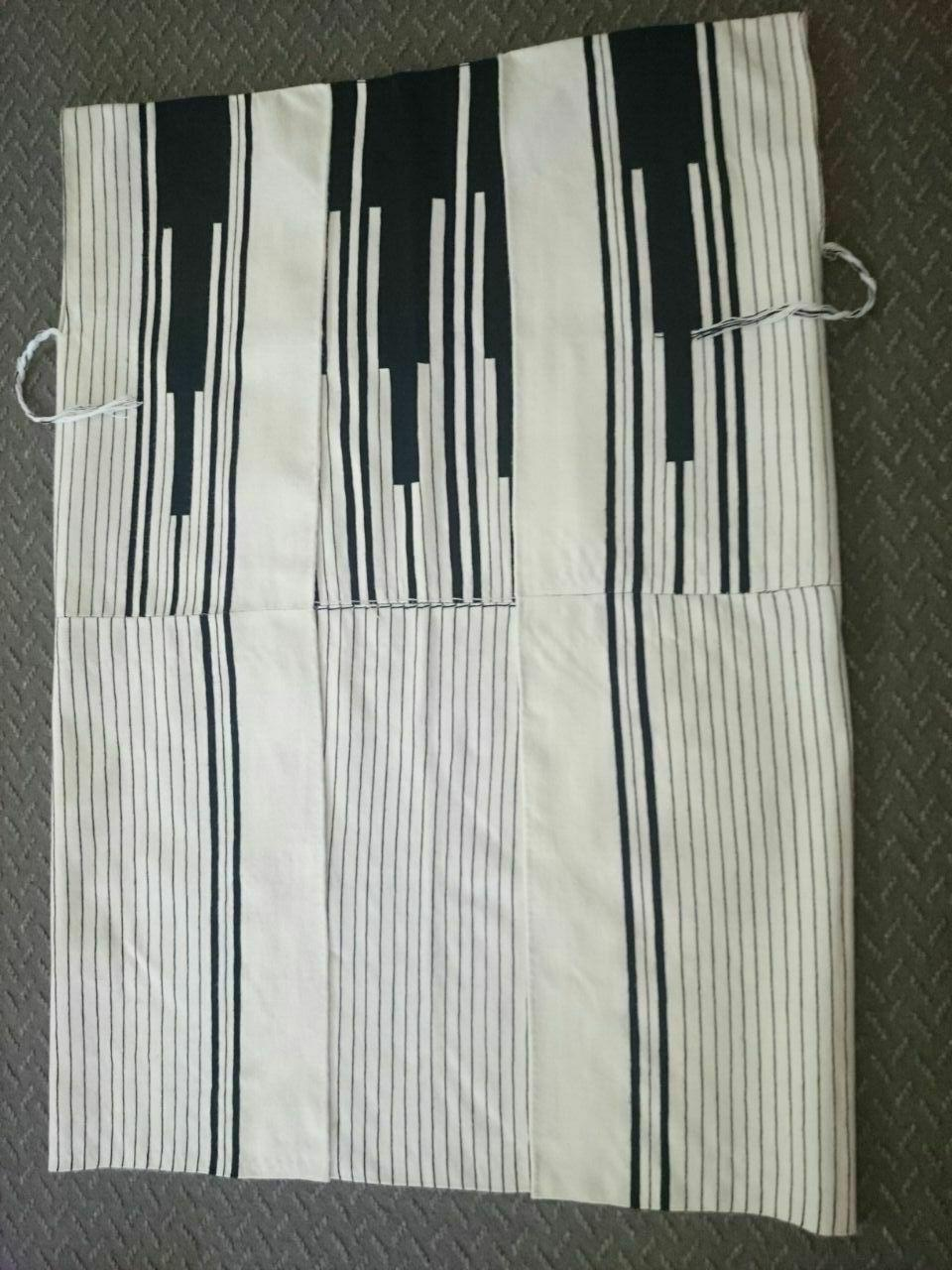
A chugha

A Choga (also Chogha, Chuga and Chugha) is a long sleeved robe or coat that is loosely worn over clothes around the bodice, usually during the cold winter months. Usually worn by men, these coats are adorned with intricate threading and come in a variety of colors and patterns. It is worn in Kazakhstan, Kyrgyzstan, Uzbekistan, Iran, Tajikistan, Afghanistan, Pakistan (by the Kho people and Shina people) and India ( in Rajasthan, Jammu and Kashmir and Himachal Pradesh ) and other surrounding countries.

It maybe made from gold brocade fabric and can feature a pattern of tea roses and smaller flowers.
