= Padri dialect =

Dialect of Bhadarwahi

Padari
- पाडरी
- Native to: India
- Region: Padar
- Native speakers: 17,279 (2011)
- Language family: Indo-European: Indo-Iranian; Indo-Aryan; ? Northern; Western Pahari; Bhadrawahi; Padari

Language codes
- ISO 639-3: –
- Glottolog: pada1256
- Coordinates: 33.26°N 76.16°E

Padderi, Padari or Padri (पाडरी pāḍrī) is a Bhadrawahi (Western Pahari) dialect spoken in the Padar valley in Kishtwar district in the Indian union territory of Jammu and Kashmir..

The Padar valley is about 80 km long, the terrain is rugged and mountainous, and the population is found mainly in scattered hamlets, with the main village being Atholi. The number of speakers, as of the 1981 census, stood at 10,000.

Padri shares a large proportion of its vocabulary with other Western Pahari varieties (like Bhadarwahi and Siraji). There are two genders: masculine and feminine (there is no neuter). Nouns change for case, but not normally for number. However, some nouns do have plurals, which are formed using a variety of strategies:

- koā -> koi 'boys'
- panna -> pannë 'leaves'
- zebbh -> zibb 'tongues'
- koi -> kui 'girls'
- thaṛo -> thenë 'walnuts'
- gobur -> children
- Dand-> teeth
- khar -> above
- Bwun -> down
- Pulley/Pulhor -> traditional grass shoes
- Lar -> roof

Family/Relations :-

- Baji/Baab - Father
- Eej - Mother
- Baay - brother
- Bhaju- younger brother
- Bhaapa- elder brother
- Bheny/Byon - Sister
- Math-Baab - Paternal uncle
- Bad-baad - elder paternal uncle
- Poph/Bui - paternal aunt
- Maam - maternal uncle
- Moss/Masy - maternal aunt
- Dowd - Grandfather
- Daed - Grandmother
- Showhr- Father in law

== Phonology ==
P.K. Koul mentions several series of "complex sounds". One such series consists of a consonant + y (for example khyaḍaṇ 'to play', syavā 'apple'), and another one involves a consonant + v (as in kvatar 'dog', lvanaṇ 'to sort'), but it is unclear whether these are co-articulated consonants (involving palatalisation and labialisation respectively) or merely sequences of two separate consonants. Another set of distinctive sounds (shared with neighbouring Bhadarwahi dialects, where they are even more widespread) involve a combination of a retroflex stop + the lateral l: ṭ͡lai 'three', niḍ͡l 'sleep', ḍ͡lau 'village'. These often correspond to clusters of a consonant + r in the ancestor language (compare the Sanskrit equivalents of the above three words: trīṇi-, nidrā- and grāma-).

== Bibliography ==
- Kaul, Pritam Krishen (2006a). Pahāṛi and Other Tribal Dialects of Jammu. Vol. 1. Delhi: Eastern Book Linkers. ISBN 8178541017.
- Kaul, Pritam Krishen (2006b). "Pāḍrī". Pahāṛi and Other Tribal Dialects of Jammu (in Hindi). Vol. 2. Delhi: Eastern Book Linkers. pp. 1–33. ISBN 8178541025. Originally published in Chandrabhāg Ṭaṭ kī Parvatīya Boliyāṃ [1977].
