= Marchen (Unicode block) =

- Range: U+11C70..U+11CBF (80 code points)
- Plane: SMP
- Scripts: Marchen
- Assigned: 68 code points
- Unused: 12 reserved code points

Unicode version history
- 9.0 (2016): 68 (+68)

Unicode documentation
- Code chart ∣ Web page

Marchen is a Unicode block containing characters from the Marchen alphabet, which has been used to write the extinct Zhang-Zhung language of the Zhang-zhung culture of Tibet. In modern Bon usage, Marchen is also used to write Tibetan.

Marchen^{[1]}^{[2]} Official Unicode Consortium code chart (PDF)
	0	1	2	3	4	5	6	7	8	9	A	B	C	D	E	F
U+11C7x	𑱰	𑱱	𑱲	𑱳	𑱴	𑱵	𑱶	𑱷	𑱸	𑱹	𑱺	𑱻	𑱼	𑱽	𑱾	𑱿
U+11C8x	𑲀	𑲁	𑲂	𑲃	𑲄	𑲅	𑲆	𑲇	𑲈	𑲉	𑲊	𑲋	𑲌	𑲍	𑲎	𑲏
U+11C9x			𑲒	𑲓	𑲔	𑲕	𑲖	𑲗	𑲘	𑲙	𑲚	𑲛	𑲜	𑲝	𑲞	𑲟
U+11CAx	𑲠	𑲡	𑲢	𑲣	𑲤	𑲥	𑲦	𑲧		𑲩	𑲪	𑲫	𑲬	𑲭	𑲮	𑲯
U+11CBx	𑲰	𑲱	𑲲	𑲳	𑲴	𑲵	𑲶									
Notes: 1. As of Unicode version 16.0; 2. Grey areas indicate non-assigned code points

== History ==
The following Unicode-related documents record the purpose and process of defining specific characters in the Marchen block:

Version	Final code points (Note: Proposed code points and characters names may differ from final code points and names)	Count	L2 ID	WG2 ID	Document
9.0	U+11C70..11C8F, 11C92..11CA7, 11CA9..11CB6	68	L2/11-140	N4032	West, Andrew (2011-04-30), Proposal to encode the Marchen script in the SMP of the UCS
9.0	U+11C70..11C8F, 11C92..11CA7, 11CA9..11CB6	68	L2/13-197	N4491	West, Andrew (2013-10-22), Final proposal to encode the Marchen script in the SMP of the UCS
9.0	U+11C70..11C8F, 11C92..11CA7, 11CA9..11CB6	68		N4403 (pdf, doc)	Umamaheswaran, V. S. (2014-01-28), "10.3.16 Marchen script", Unconfirmed minutes of WG 2 meeting 61, Holiday Inn, Vilnius, Lithuania; 2013-06-10/14
9.0	U+11C70..11C8F, 11C92..11CA7, 11CA9..11CB6	68	L2/14-026		Moore, Lisa (2014-02-17), "D.13", UTC #138 Minutes
9.0	U+11C70..11C8F, 11C92..11CA7, 11CA9..11CB6	68		N4553 (pdf, doc)	Umamaheswaran, V. S. (2014-09-16), "M62.10", Minutes of WG 2 meeting 62 Adobe, San Jose, CA, USA
9.0	U+11C70..11C8F, 11C92..11CA7, 11CA9..11CB6	68	L2/15-017		Moore, Lisa (2015-02-12), "Consensus 142-C16", UTC #142 Minutes, "Rescind approval of U+11CA8 MARCHEN SUBJOINED LETTER -A."
