= Dhuleli language =

West Himalayish language of Nepal

Dhuleli
- Native to: Nepal
- Region: Kanda, Bajhang District
- Native speakers: 347 (2017)
- Language family: Sino-Tibetan: Tibeto-Kanauri ?; West Himalayish; Almora; Dhuleli

Language codes
- ISO 639-3: –
- Glottolog: dhul1234

Dhuleli is a West Himalayish language of Nepal. It is closely related to Byangsi. Dhuleli has been documented by Regmi & Prasain (2017), who reported 347 speakers as of 2017.

Dhuleli is spoken in the four villages of Dhuli, Jagera, Balaundi, and Niuna in Kanda Gaunpalika, Bajhang District, Nepal.
