= Marchen script =

Script for the Zhangzhung language

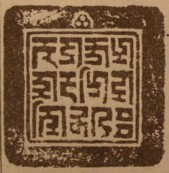
- Supposed seal of the last kings of Zhangzhung
- Script type: Abugida
- Period: 7th–10th century CE
- Direction: Left-to-right
- Languages: Zhangzhung language

Related scripts
- Parent systems: Egyptian: Proto-Sinaitic; Phoenician; Aramaic; Brahmi; Gupta; Tibetan; Marchen script
- Sister systems: Meitei, Lepcha, Khema, Phagspa

ISO 15924
- ISO 15924: Marc (332), Marchen

Unicode
- Unicode alias: Marchen
- Unicode range: U+11C70–U+11CBF Marchen
- The theorised Semitic origins of the Brahmi script are not universally agreed upon.

The Marchen script was a Brahmic abugida which was used for writing the extinct Zhangzhung language. It was derived from the Tibetan script.

== Script ==
As per McKay (2003), the Zhang-zhung script was modelled after Thonmi Sambhota's Tibetan script:

"There is also a Zhang-zhung alphabet, but despite its rather unusual appearance to anyone who is unfamiliar with the Indo-Tibetan ornate style of lettering known as lan-tsha, one observes that it is modeled letter by letter upon Thon-mi Sambhota's alphabet of thirty letters."

A number of scripts are recorded as being used for writing the Zhang-Zhung language:

- Marchen or Greater Mar script (Tibetan: སྨར་ཆེན་, Wylie: smar chen)
- Marchung or Lesser Mar script (Tibetan: སྨར་ཆུང་, Wylie: smar chung)
- Pungchen or Greater Pung script (Tibetan: སྤུངས་ཆེན་, Wylie: spungs chen)
- Pungchung or Lesser Pung script (Tibetan: སྤུངས་ཆུང་, Wylie: spungs chung)
- Drusha script (Tibetan: བྲུ་ཤ་, Wylie: bru sha)

These scripts have mostly been observed in calligraphy manuals. One extant document, a seal originally held at Tsurpu monastery, is written in the Marchen script.

== Description ==
The Marchen scripts has some similarities with the Tibetan scripts and Lantsa but at the same time differs considerably from these. It also differs from other writing systems in the Bon tradition, such as Marchung, Pungchen, Pungchung and Drusha. A feature the Marchen script shares with Tibetan script and Lantsa are the special subjoined variants of the letters wa, ya and ra. The vowel diacritics are most similar to those of Drusha. A distinguishing feature of the Marchen script is the presence of a left-facing swastika, a symbol of the Bon religion, which is used both to write the letter nya and as a punctuation mark.

The Marchen script consists of 30 consonant letters, four vowel diacritics, a vowel length marker -a and two diacritics for nasalization (corresponding to candrabindu and anusvara). Each consonant has an accompanying vowel a which can be modified with the four vowel diacritics. Consonant clusters are written just like in Tibetan script by stacking two or more consonants on top of each other vertically. Just as in Tibetan script, there are simplified forms for medial w, y and r. However, there is no simplified form of initial r. Unlike in Tibetan script, there is no sign to mark syllable boundaries, which means that ambiguities can sometimes arise.

The Marchen script can be written in two different styles: one with thick angular letters and one with thin rounded ones.

== Alphabet ==
=== Vowels ===
Marchen vowels
𑲏 a	𑲈 ā

Marchen dependent vowel diacritics
𑲯 a	𑲰 ā	𑲱 i	𑲲 u	𑲳 e	𑲴 o

=== Consonants ===
Marchen consonants
𑱲 ka	𑱳 kha	𑱴 ga	𑱵 ṅa
𑱶 ca	𑱷 cha	𑱸 ja	𑱹 ña
𑱺 ta	𑱻 tha	𑱼 da	𑱽 na
𑱾 pa	𑱿 pha	𑲀 ba	𑲁 ma
𑲉 ya	𑲊 ra	𑲋 la	𑲅 wa
𑲌 śa	𑲍 sa	𑲎 ha	
𑲂 tsa	𑲃 tśa	𑲄 dza	
𑲆 zha	𑲇 za		

== Signs ==
Anusvara	𑲵
Chandrabindu	𑲶
Head mark	𑱰
Shad	𑱱
Om	𑲏𑲴𑲶

== Unicode ==
Marchen script was added to the Unicode Standard in June, 2016 with the release of version 9.0.

The Unicode block for Marchen is U+11C70–U+11CBF:

Marchen^{[1]}^{[2]} Official Unicode Consortium code chart (PDF)
	0	1	2	3	4	5	6	7	8	9	A	B	C	D	E	F
U+11C7x	𑱰	𑱱	𑱲	𑱳	𑱴	𑱵	𑱶	𑱷	𑱸	𑱹	𑱺	𑱻	𑱼	𑱽	𑱾	𑱿
U+11C8x	𑲀	𑲁	𑲂	𑲃	𑲄	𑲅	𑲆	𑲇	𑲈	𑲉	𑲊	𑲋	𑲌	𑲍	𑲎	𑲏
U+11C9x			𑲒	𑲓	𑲔	𑲕	𑲖	𑲗	𑲘	𑲙	𑲚	𑲛	𑲜	𑲝	𑲞	𑲟
U+11CAx	𑲠	𑲡	𑲢	𑲣	𑲤	𑲥	𑲦	𑲧		𑲩	𑲪	𑲫	𑲬	𑲭	𑲮	𑲯
U+11CBx	𑲰	𑲱	𑲲	𑲳	𑲴	𑲵	𑲶									
Notes 1.As of Unicode version 17.0 2.Grey areas indicate non-assigned code points
