= Rongpo language =

Sino-Tibetan language spoken in India

Rongpo
- Rangpo
- /r~øpø/
- Conversation between a Marcha-Rongpo speaker couple
- Pronunciation: [/r~øpø/]
- Native to: India
- Region: Uttarakhand
- Ethnicity: Rongpa
- Native speakers: (7,500 cited 2001)
- Language family: Sino-Tibetan: Tibeto-Burman; Tibeto-Kanauri (?); West Himalayish; Rongpo–Almora; Rongpo
- Dialects: Marcha; Tolcha †

Language codes
- ISO 639-3: rnp
- Glottolog: rong1264
- ELP: Rongpo

Rongpo (also known as Rangpo [/r~øpø/] and Rang Po Bhasa [/r~øpø/]) is a West Himalayish language spoken in Uttarakhand, India. It is the historic native language of the Rongpa people. George Abraham Grierson originally called the language as one of the Tibetic languages, but is now considered as an independent language.

== Geographical distribution ==
Rongpo is spoken in the following locations of Uttarakhand, India (Ethnologue).

- Niti Valley, Joshimath tehsil, Chamoli District, Garhwal Division, Uttarakhand (in Niti, Gamshali, Bampa, and Malari villages)
- Mana valley, Joshimath tehsil Chamoli District, Garhwal Division, Uttarakhand: Mana, Indradhara, Gajkoti, Pathiya-Dhantoli, Hanuman Chatti, Benakuli, and Aut.

== Dialects ==
A couple discuss events around their marriage in Marcha dialect from Mana

The two different dialects of Rongpo are called the Marcha (Marchha) and the Tolcha (Tolchha) dialect, Both dialects only have a difference in the phonetic level and are written in the same way.

=== Marcha ===
Marcha dialect is spoken in Mana and Niti valleys.

=== Tolcha ===
Tolcha
- Tolchha
- Native to: India
- Region: Niti Valley
- Ethnicity: Tolcchas
- Extinct: since the 1950s
- Language family: Sino-Tibetan: Tibeto-Burman; Tibeto-Kanauri (?); West Himalayish; Rongpo–Almora; Rongpo; Tolcha

Language codes
- ISO 639-3: None (mis)
- Linguist List: rnp-tol
- Glottolog: tolc1238
- ELP: Rongpo

There are a few Tolchha dialect speakers in Niti valley. Tolcha is usually considered its own independent and separate language from Rongpo. Tolcha has been considered extinct by the UNESCO Atlas of the World's Languages in Danger since the 1950s.
