= Kyunglung =

Tibetan village and archaeological site of the Zhangzhung polity

Coordinates: 31°02′N 80°35′E

Kyunglung (alternatively Khyunglung, Qulong, or Qulongcun) is a village located within Tibet. Known as the "Silver Palace of Garuda Valley" (Tibetan: ཁྱུང་ལུང་དངུལ་མཁར།, Wylie: khyung lung dngul mkhar, Chinese: 琼隆银城), Kyunglung Ngüka is situated southwest of Mount Kailash (Wylie: gangs ti se). It is associated with palaces found in the upper Sutlej Valley, which were once part of the capital city of the ancient Zhangzhung kingdom.

Scholars and theorists hypothesize that Kyunglung may correspond to what the Zhangzhung people referred to as Tagzig Olmo Lung Ring. Additionally, certain ancient Bonpo texts allude to present-day Tajikistan, connecting the Shangshung term "Tag-Zig" with today's "Ta-jik". The suffix "-istan" is a Persian term applied following Islamic rule. It is noted that during the 7th-century reign of the Tibetan king Songtsen Gampo, Tajikistan was under Tibetan rule. The Shangshung emperor was executed during a conflict in Amdo, a region of Tibet approximately equivalent to Qinghai province. Given that the Bon tradition's Buddha is believed to originate from this area, Tajikistan holds a significant place in Shangshung history.

== Ruins ==
The Khyunglung site is an intricate cave complex located on the northern bank of the Sutlej River, approximately 30 km west of the hot springs and gompa of Tirthapuri and the nearby coal mining town of Moincêr/Montser. This area is part of the modern Chinese prefecture of Ali/Ngari within the Tibet Autonomous Region. Additional ancient ruins can be found atop the hill near the Bon monastery of Gurugem/Gurugyam, which is a mere 6 km away from Tirthapuri. Despite their historical significance, these sites have received minimal published attention, and very few archaeological investigations have been conducted.

The Khyunglung caves are typically small, around 4 square meters in size, and each contains a small raised fireplace at its far end. However, the absence of a chimney in most of these caves, as evidenced by their smoke-blackened ceilings, suggests that smoke would have exited through the sole entrance, resulting in a thick smoky interior during fire use. Many of the caves house ancient artifacts dating back to the Zhangzhung era, including small stones inscribed with ancient Tibetan script, stone statues of Bon deities, and various vases and pots. There is little indication of living spaces or storage areas, which suggests that these fires were likely used for sacrificial offerings. Some of these caves are still utilized for such purposes today, as indicated by the presence of scattered bones and feathers.

Notably, there are no visible springs, water channels, or wells within the Khyunglung site. It is presumed that water from the nearby river was used. However, the Sutlej River in this region is characterized by its poor quality, mainly due to a large sulfurous hot spring upstream. The immediate vicinity of the caves does not show signs of agriculture, such as terraces for fields or fertile grazing land.

It is suggested that Kyunglung may not have been a conventional "city" per se, but rather served as a gathering place for Bonpo magicians during specific events when various clans congregated. Possible camping grounds for the main retinue could have been located in the broader valley upstream from the modern village of Khyunglung or in the area between Gurugem and Tirthapuri, which is still frequented by nomadic yak and sheep herders. The ruins above Gurugem seem to be a more plausible site for permanent habitation, but further research is necessary to confirm this.

== Present-day ==
The present-day village of Kyunglung is situated just upstream from its ancient namesake. It is a small community comprising modest households, and its residents heavily rely on yaks for both agricultural activities and transportation. The village itself is steeped in history, and its inhabitants maintain a way of life that has remained largely unchanged for over a century. The people of Kyunglung continue to follow the ancient religion of Bon, the same faith practiced by their Zhangzhung ancestors.

== See also ==
List of towns and villages in Tibet
