= Lippa, Kinnaur =

Lippa is a village in the Kinnaur district of Himachal Pradesh, India.

Lippa is situated at 2,438 meters above sea level, in the Morang tehsil of Kinnaur district. The villagers of Lippa belong to the Kinnaura community. They follow the Drukpa Kagyu school of Tibetan Buddhism, intermixed with the worship of local animist deities and ancestral spirits. The famous 20th century Buddhist scholar and poet Khunu Lama Tenzin Gyaltsen received his earliest instruction in Tibetan Buddhism at Lippa village.

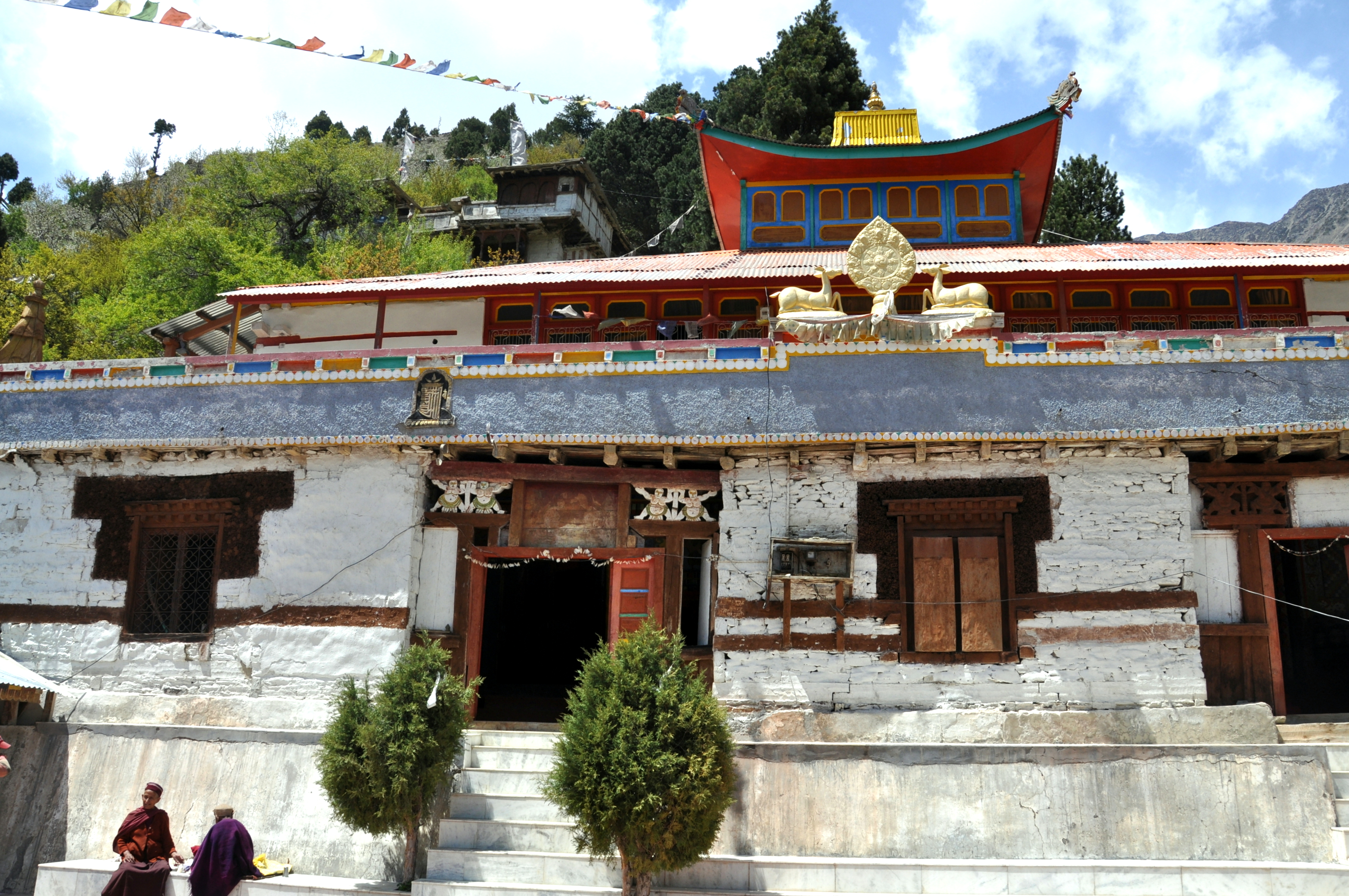
Monastery at Lippa village, Kinnaur.

Jangrami or Jangshung is the traditional language of Lippa, though today they speak Hindi and English as well. Important annual festivals celebrated in Lippa include 'Fulch', usually in August or September, and 'Ormi', in February.

The nearby Lippa Asarang Wildlife Sanctuary of Kinnaur is partly named after Lippa village. The Asiatic brown bear, musk deer, goral, ibex, blue sheep, and wild yak can be found in this wildlife sanctuary, spread over 31 square kilometers.

The villagers of Lippa have been opposed to the Integrated Kashang Hydroelectric Project, which was first proposed in 2002, claiming that it will negatively affect their agriculture, horticulture, and forest produce.
