= Zhang Zhung Meri =

Bön Deity

Zhangzhung Meri is a meditational deity of the Bon religion arising from the ancient land of "Zhang Zhung" in Tibet. He is believed to be the high protector of the Zhang Zhung Nyen Gyud lineage.
