= Tinani language =

Sino-Tibetan language spoken in India and Tibet

Tinani
- Rangloi
- Lahuli
- Region: Himachal Pradesh, Tibet
- Native speakers: (23,000 in India cited 2001); 450 in China (1977)
- Language family: Sino-Tibetan: Tibeto-Kanauri ?; West Himalayish; Lahaulic; Tinani

Language codes
- ISO 639-3: lbf
- Glottolog: tina1246
- ELP: Tinani

Tinani (Tinan) is a Sino-Tibetan language spoken in the Indian state of Himachal Pradesh and in western Tibet.

Tinani is spoken in the lower Chandra, Tinan, and Rangloi valleys of Lahaul and Spiti district in Himachal Pradesh (Ethnologue). Gondhla is main village.

== Bibliography ==
- Francke, August Hermann (1909), "Tabellen der Pronomina und Verba in den drei Sprachen Lahoul's: Bunan, Manchad und Tinan", Zeitschrift der Deutschen Morgenländischen Gesellschaft, 63: 65–97
- Singh, Jag Deva (1989), "Lahauli verb inflection", Linguistics of the Tibeto-Burman Area, 12: 41–49
- Sharma, D. D. (1992), "Tinani", Tribal Languages of Himachal Pradesh: Part One, New Delhi: Mittal Publications, pp. 111–186
- Chamberlain, Brad; Chamberlain, Wendy (2019), A Sociolinguistic Survey of Lahul Valley, Himachal Pradesh (PDF), Dallas: SIL International
