= Jangshung language =

Sino-Tibetan language of India

Jangshung
- Region: Himachal Pradesh
- Native speakers: (1990 cited 1998)
- Language family: Sino-Tibetan: Bodic ?; West Himalayish; Kinnauric; Thebor; Jangshung

Language codes
- ISO 639-3: jna
- Glottolog: jang1254
- ELP: Jangshung

Jangshung is an underdocumented Sino-Tibetan language spoken in Kinnaur district, Himachal Pradesh, India. Most Jangshung speakers reside in the villages of Jangi, Lippa and Asrang. They belong to the upper caste, while the lower castes in the same villages speak Shumcho, a related but distinct language of the Kinnauric branch.

Jangshung is closely related to its larger neighbor Kinnauri and sometimes considered one of its dialects. Like most language varieties of Himachal Pradesh, Jangshung was occasionally written in the traditional Takri script, but it has largely fallen out of use in the 20th century. Today, it is mostly a spoken language. Most Jangshung speakers are multilingual and typically use Hindi and English in writing and other formal contexts.

== See also ==
- Zhang Zhung
