= Shumcho language =

Sino-Tibetan language of India

Shumcho
- Region: Himachal Pradesh
- Native speakers: 2400 (2022)
- Language family: Sino-Tibetan: Bodic ?; West Himalayish; Kinnauric; Thebor; Shumcho

Language codes
- ISO 639-3: scu
- Glottolog: shum1243

Shumcho is an underdocumented Sino-Tibetan language spoken in Kinnaur district, Himachal Pradesh, India.

Shumcho speakers make up a majority of the population in the villages of Kanam, Labrang, Spillo, Shyaso, Rushkalang and Taling. They also reside in the mixed villages of Sunnam, Jangi, Lippa and Asrang where they belong to the lower Scheduled Caste. Upper-caste Scheduled Tribe dwellers of the same villages speak related but distinct languages, Sunam and Jangshung.

== Bibliography ==
- Huber, Christian (2011), "Some notes on gender and number marking in Shumcho", in Gerda Lechleitner; Christian Liebl (eds.), Jahrbuch des Phonogrammarchivs der Österreichischen Akademie der Wissenschaften 2, Göttingen: Cuvillier, pp. 52–90
- Huber, Christian (2014), "Subject and object agreement in Shumcho", in Nathan Hill; Thomas Owen-Smith (eds.), Trans-Himalayan Linguistics, Berlin: Mouton de Gruyter, pp. 221–274
- Huber, Christian (2014), "The Verbal Plural Marker in Shumcho", in Ludmila Veselovská; Markéta Janebová (eds.), Complex Visibles Out There, Olomouc: Palacky University, pp. 193–216
- Huber, Christian (2019), "Progressivity and habituality in Shumcho", STUF - Language Typology and Universals, 72 (1): 83–132
- Huber, Christian (2023), "Gender marking in Shumcho", in Marc Allassonnière-Tang; Marcin Kilarski (eds.), Nominal Classification in Asia and Oceania: Functional and diachronic perspectives, Amsterdam: John Benjamins, pp. 58–112
