= Khunu Lama Tenzin Gyaltsen =

Tibetan Buddhist layman (1894–1977)

Tenzin Gyaltsen Negi

Personal life
- Born: 1894 Sunam
- Died: February 20, 1977 (aged 82–83)
- Other names: Khunu Rinpoche; Negi Lama Tenzin Gyaltsen

Religious life
- Religion: Tibetan Buddhism
- School: Rimé movement
- Lineage: Nyingma and Kagyu

Senior posting
- Teacher: Khenpo Shenga, Khenpo Kunpal, Kathok Situ, Drikung Agon, Dzongsar Khentse
- Students: 14th Dalai Lama, Drikung Khandro, Wangdor Rimpoche, Khenpo Thupten, Khenpo Konchok Gyalysen, HH Dilgo Khyentse, Khenchen Palden Sherab Rinpoche, Drikung Lamchen Gyalpo Rinpoche, Karma Thinley Rinpoche, Khenchen Thupten Ozer, Dzigar Lama Wangdor, Karma Trinley Rinpoche, Khenpo Konchog Monlam, Dezhung Rinpoche, Lama Thupten Yeshe/Lama Yeshe, Zopa Rinpoche/Lama Zopa Rinpoche

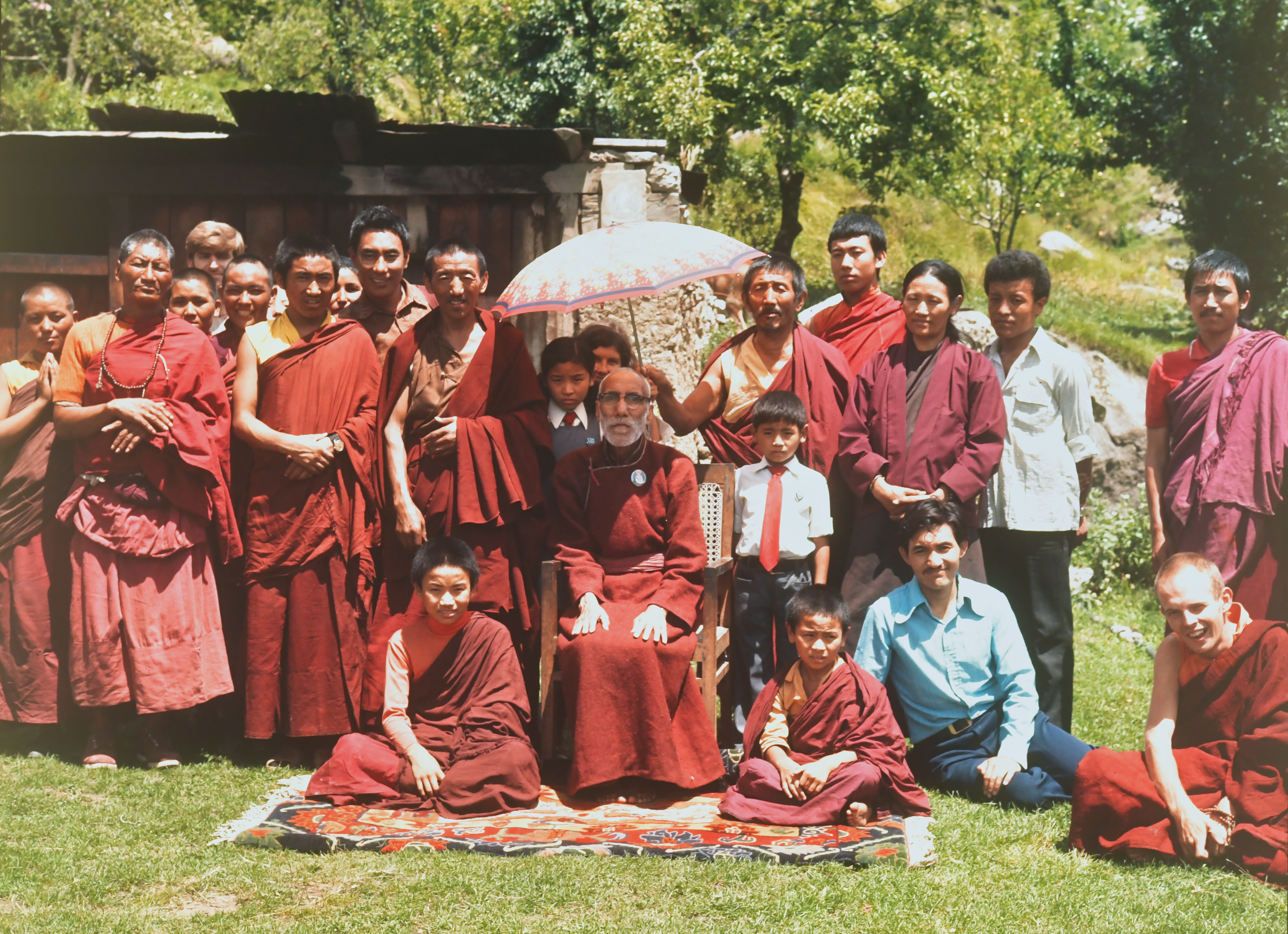
Khunu Lama (centre, seated on chair) at Manali, 1976.

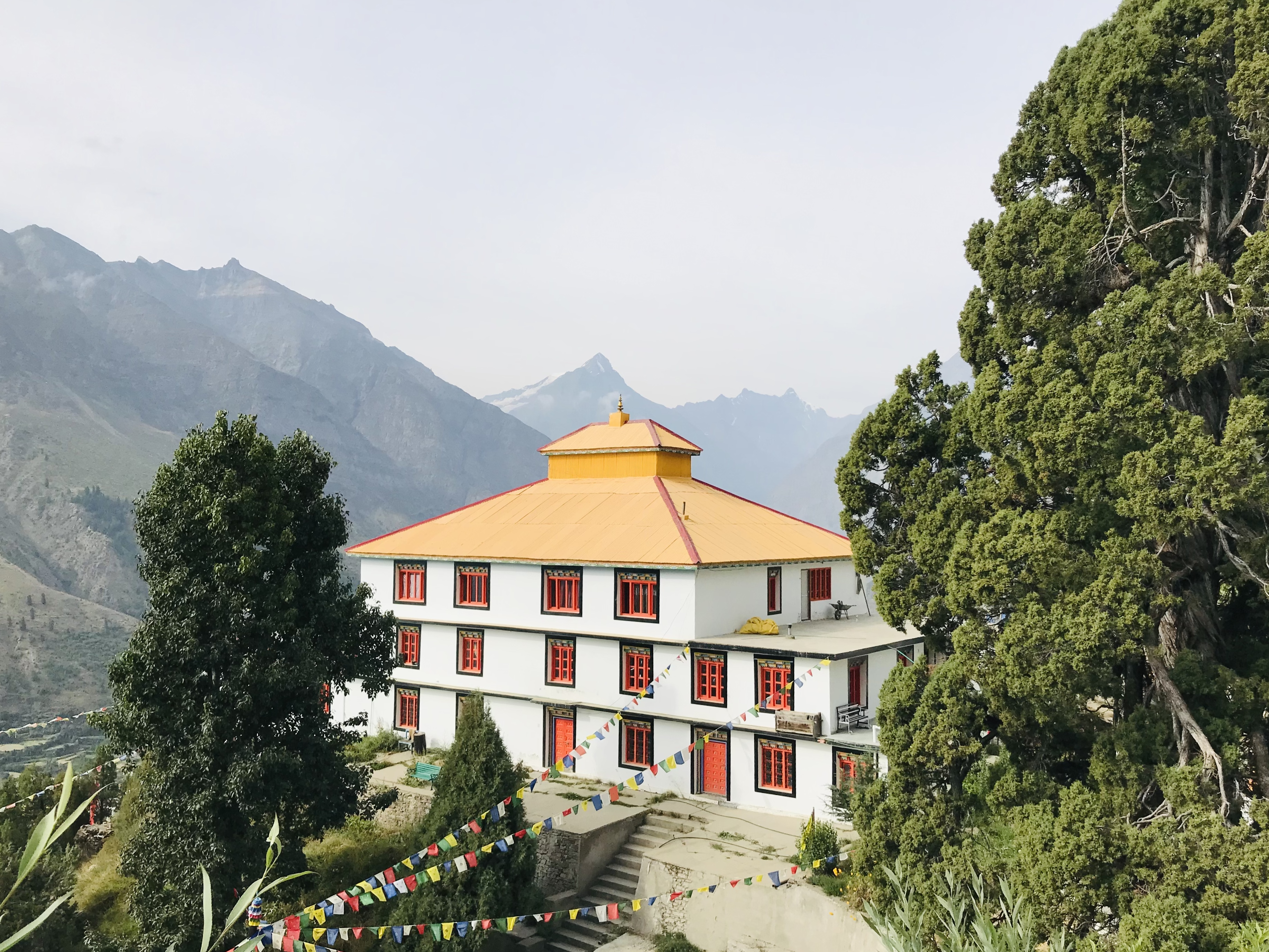
Shashur monastery in Lahaul today, where Khunu Lama breathed his last.

Khunu Lama Tenzin Gyaltsen (Tibetan: ཁུ་ནུ་བླ་མ་བསྟན་འཛིན་རྒྱལ་མཚན, Wylie: khu nu bla ma bstan 'dzin rgyal mtshan; 1894/early 95 – February 20, 1977) was a Tibetan Buddhist scholar and teacher in the Rimé tradition, a Dzogchen master, and a teacher of several important Rinpoches of the late 20th century, including the 14th Dalai Lama. He hailed from Kinnaur, India. He was also known as Negi Lama Tenzin Gyaltsen (Tibetan: ནེ་གི་བླ་མ་བསྟན་འཛིན་རྒྱལ་མཚན, Wylie: ne gi bla ma bstan 'dzin rgyal mtshan), Tenzin Gyaltsen (bstan 'dzin rgyal mtshan), and various other names like Kunu (khu nu) Rinpoche, Kunu Lama, and Negi Lama (ne gi bla ma).

== Biography ==
Khunu Lama was born in 1894/early 1895 in the village of Sunam which lies in the present-day Kinnaur district of India, in the Western Himalayas. For this reason, he later came to be known as 'Khunu Lama' or 'Khunu Rinpoche', 'Khunu' being the native word for Kinnaur. He was also often called 'Negi Lama' after the name of his community, the Negis of Kinnaur.

His uncle Rasvir Das taught him how to read and write Tibetan and some basic Buddhist texts. He also received preliminary spiritual instruction in Tibetan Buddhism at village Lippa in Kinnaur, under a student of the famous 19th century teacher Sakya Shri. Between 1913 and the 1940s, Khunu Lama spent 34 years travelling, studying, and teaching in various parts of Tibet and India outside Kinnaur. He studied various fields related to Tibetan Buddhism as well as Tibetan grammar and composition at Rumtek, Tashilhunpo, Lhasa, Derge, and Sanskrit at Kolkatta and Varanasi.

He taught at the famed Mentsi Khang of Lhasa for three years (mid-1930s), besides teaching more extensively in Lhasa, Tashilhunpo, and Kham. After 1947, he spent about eight years living and teaching in his native Kinnaur. By the end of the 1950s, he returned to Varanasi, and took up a teaching position at the Sanskrit University there. He also spent some time teaching in Srinagar, Mussourie, Gangtok, Kathmandu, and Kullu-Manali. Khunu Lama died at the age of 82 at Shashur Monastery in the Lahaul and Spiti district of Himachel Pradesh on February 20, 1977, while teaching the final page of Gampopa's Jewel Ornament of Liberation.

== Works and significance ==
Khunu Rinpoche was not officially recognized as a tulku and was not an ordained Buddhist monk. He was a layman (Wylie: dge bsnyen, Skt. upāsaka) who had taken lay practitioner's vows before becoming a Tibetan Buddhist master. He is renowned as one of the influential teachers in the Rimé (non-sectarian) movement within Tibetan Buddhism, and as a Dzogchen master. The 14th Dalai Lama's "respect for him was profound: He would prostrate to Rinpoche in the dust when they met at the Great Stupa in Bodh Gaya." According to Gene Smith's research on reminiscences, interviews, and writings of H.H. Dilgo Khyentse Rinpoche, Sogyal Rinpoche, and Matthieu Ricard, Khunu Lama's profound knowledge of Tibetan Buddhism led him to be recognized by lamas of different schools as one of the "greatest Tibetan lamas of his time although not ethnically Tibetan." He lived the life of a wandering yogi with a devoted female companion, the Drikung Khandro.

A foremost scholar of Sanskrit and Classical Tibetan "as a prerequisite to the study of the religious texts" who "gained a reputation for extraordinary scholarship," Khunu Rinpoche traveled widely in Tibet and India disseminating essential teachings of Buddhist philosophy, and was known for shunning attention. The 14th Dalai Lama found it difficult to locate him, and sent emissaries to Buddhist pilgrimage sites and the places where Khunu Lama was known to have taught. He was accidentally discovered living incognito in a Shiva temple in Varanasi. The Dalai Lama visited him and, after initially being turned away, asked Khunu Lama to teach the younger tulkus who had accompanied him into exile, and to teach him personally as well.

His students include Drikung Khandro, Khenpo Konchok Gyaltsen, Lamkhen Gyalpo Rinpoche and the 14th Dalai Lama. While the Dalai Lama had highly qualified teachers and debate partners, he used to clarify philosophical concepts in discussions with Khunu Lama and called him the "Shantideva of our time." Among several teachings that the Dalai Lama received from Khunu Rinpoche was the celebrated Bodhisattvacaryāvatāra or Guide to the Bodhisattva's Way of Life by Shantideva. Even though Khunu Lama Rinpoché was a lay practitioner, the Dalai Lama "had no hesitation in receiving a thorough explanation of Shantideva's 'Way of the Bodhisattva' from him," and often refers to Khunu Lama as "one of my root gurus" when teaching.

His work on bodhicitta was translated and published under the title of Vast as the Heavens, Deep as the Sea: Verses in Praise of Bodhicitta by Wisdom Publications in 1999.

== Reincarnation ==
Two reincarnations were identified, both of whom were born in 1979. Jangchhub Nyima was born to a Tibetan father and Danish mother, and was recognised as Khunu Lama's reincarnation by the Dalai Lama and the Sakya Trizin. Tenzin Priyadarshi, (born in Vaishali, Bihar), was ordained by the Dalai Lama. He received teachings from the Sakya Trizin, Kushok Bakula, and Samdhong Rinpoche, all of whom had connections with Khunu Rinpoche. He currently teaches at the Massachusetts Institute of Technology.

== Biographical sketches ==
Several biographical works of Khunu Rinpoche have been published in recent times. The works in English language are mostly based on a namthar of Khunu Rinpoche or limited interviews. Namthar often constitute a blend of legends and facts recorded for aspirational purposes. A work in Hindi was published by Prabhu Lal Negi based on namthar and a wider selection of interviews conducted in local language ("नेगी रिनपोछे तेनज़ीन ग्यालछेन का व्यक्तित्व एवं कृतित्व- Negi Rinpochhe Tenzin Gyaltsen ka vyaktitv evam krititv").

== Sources ==
- Priyadarshi, Tenzin and Houshmand, Zara (June 22, 2021). Running Toward Mystery, The Adventure of an Unconventional Life. New York, New York: Penguin Random House, |isbn= . ISBN 9781984819871.
- Dodin, Thierry (1993). "Negi Lama Tenzin Gyaltsen: A preliminary account of the life of a modern Buddhist saint". In Osmaston, Henry (ed.). Recent research on Ladakh 6: Proceedings of the Sixth International Colloquium on Ladakh, Leh 1993. Delhi: Motilal Banarsidass (published 1997). ISBN 8120814320. OCLC 243896748.
- Pitkin, Anabella (2012). "Lineage, Authority and Innovation: The Biography of Khunu Lama Tenzin Gyaltsen". In Tuttle, Gray (ed.). Mapping the Modern in Tibet. PIATS 2006: Proceedings of the Eleventh Seminar of the International Association for Tibetan Studies. Institute for Tibetan and Buddhist Studies GmbH. ISBN 978-3-03809-111-0.
- Pitkin, Anabella (2009). "Practicing Philosophy: The Intellectual Biography of Khunu Lama Tenzin Gyaltsen (Ph.D.). Columbia.
- Pitkin, Anabella (2004). "Cosmopolitanism in the Himalayas: The intellectual and spiritual journeys of Khu nu bLa ma sTan 'dzin rgyal mtshan and his Sikkimese teacher, Khang gsar ba bLa ma O rgyan bstan 'dzin Rin po che" (PDF). Bulletin of Tibetology. 40 (2). Gangtok: Namgyal Institute of Tibetology: 5–24.
- Lamchen Gyalpo Rinpoche (n.d.). "Sunlight Blessings That Cure the Longing of Remembrance: A Biography of the Omniscient Khunu Mahāsattva, Tenzin Gyeltsen" (PDF). [sugatagarbhatranslations.com/ Sugatagarbha Translations]. Erick Tsiknopoulos and Mike Dickman (translators).
- "Khunu Lama Tenzin Gyaltsen". RigpaWiki. Rigpa. n.d.
