= Tibetan Hospital of the Tibet Autonomous Region =

Hospital in Lhasa, Tibet, China

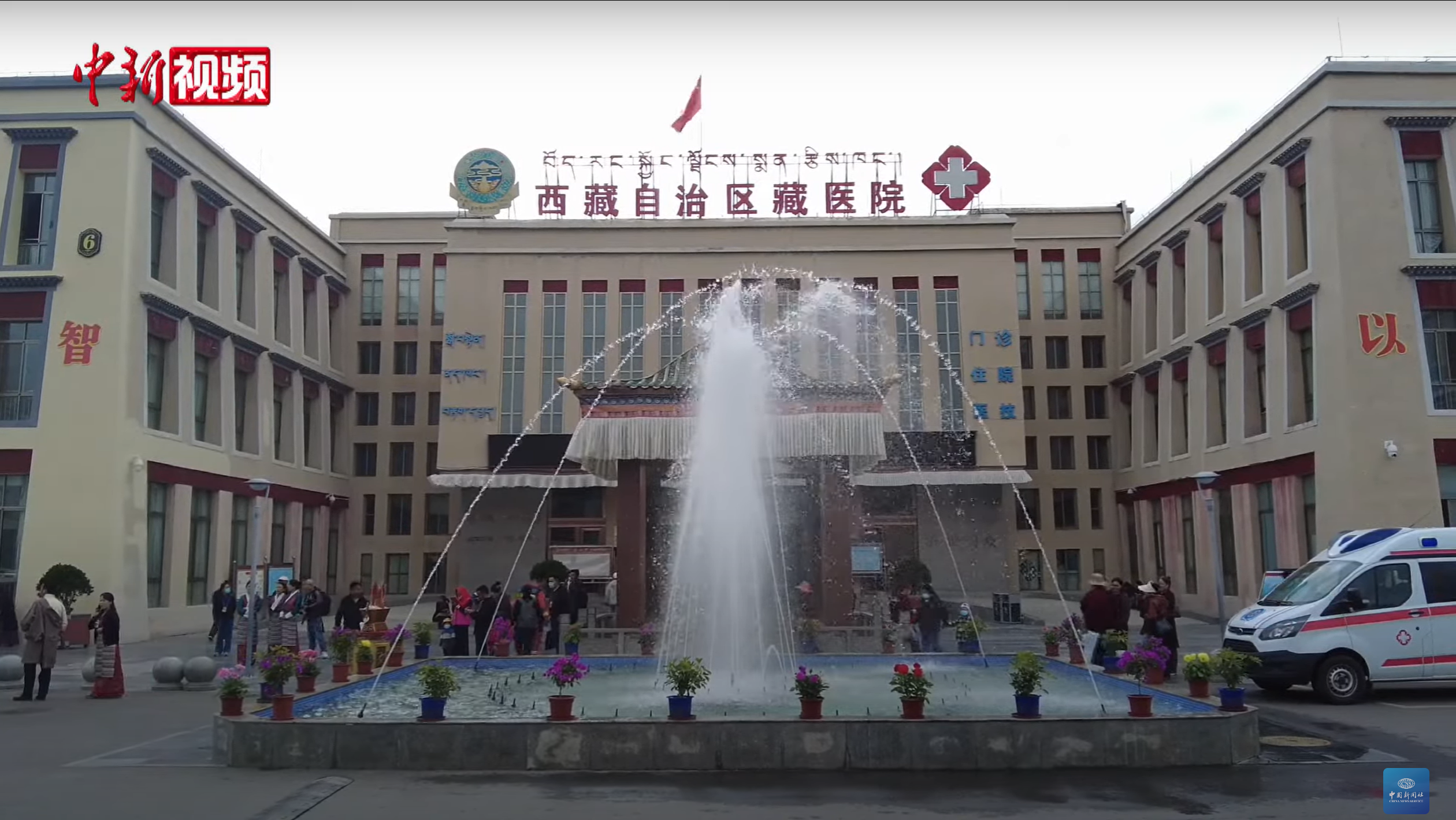
Tibetan Hospital of the Tibet Autonomous Region in 2023

Tibetan Hospital of the Tibet Autonomous Region (西藏自治区藏医院, Tibetan: བོད་རང་སྐྱོང་ལྗོངས་སྨན་རྩིས་ཁང་, Wylie transcription: Bod Raṅ-skyoṅ-ljoṅs Sman-rtsis-khaṅ, THL: bö renky önjön samentsikhen) is a Tibetan medical hospital in Lhasa, Tibet, China.

== History ==
In 1959, the Preparatory Committee of the Tibet Autonomous Region merged Mentsikhang (སྨན་རྩིས་ཁང་) and Chagpori College of Medicine to establish the Lhasa Tibetan Hospital. It was renamed as the Labor People's Hospital in 1966. On September 1, 1980, the Tibet Autonomous Region expanded Lhasa Tibetan Hospital to become Tibetan Hospital of Tibet Autonomous Region (西藏自治区藏医院), laying a foundation for the development of Tibetan medicine.

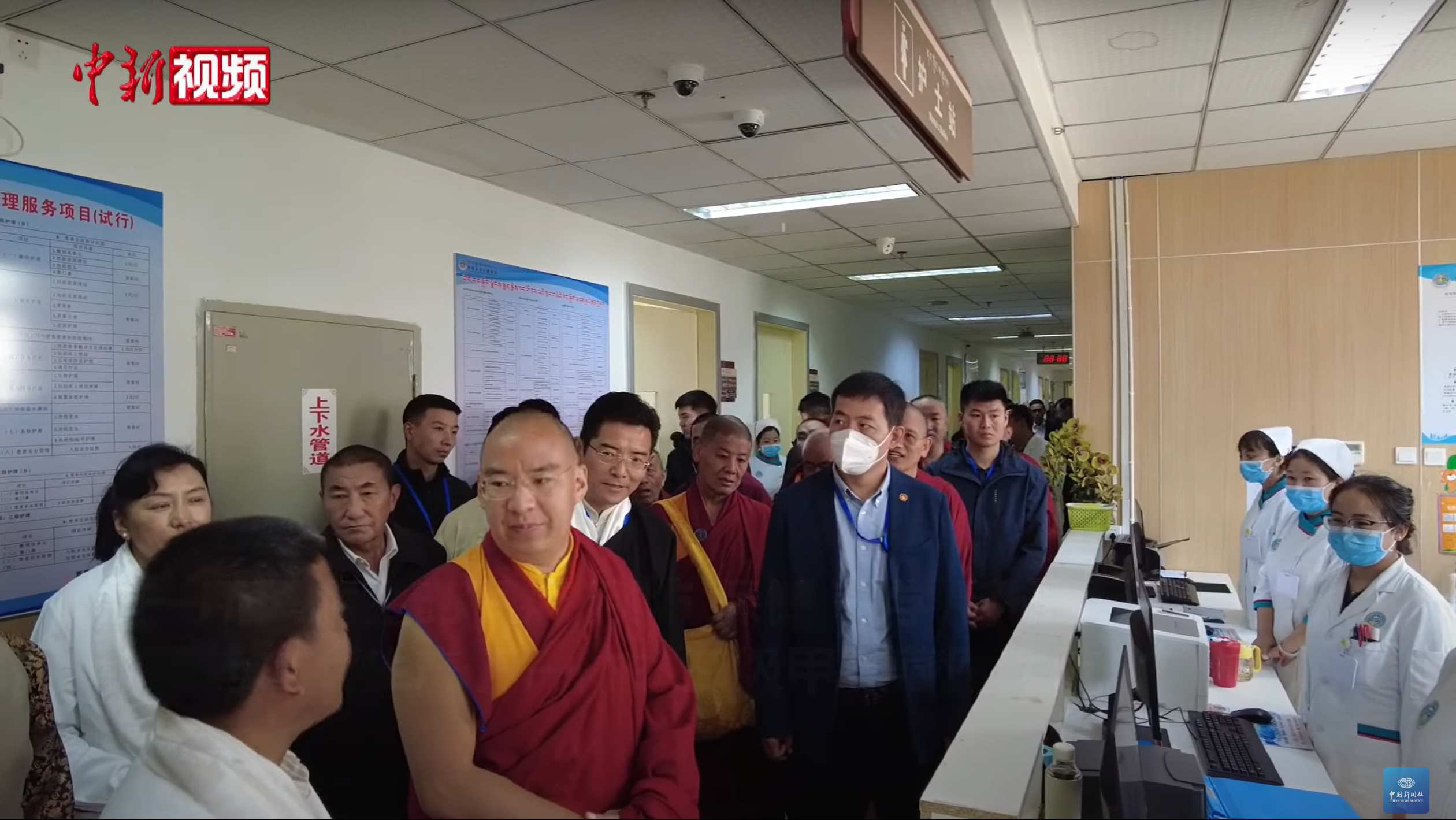
Panchan Lama Gyaincain Norbu visited the Tibetan Hospital of the Tibet Autonomous Region on July 28, 2023

In 1996, the hospital was honored as one of the National Hundred Model Traditional Chinese Medicine Hospitals, and in 2005, it passed evaluation as a Third Grade A Tibetan Hospital in accordance with the Standard for Classification of Third Grade Tibetan Hospitals in the Tibet Autonomous Region. In 2017, the hospital in the pre-construction and completion of the renovation and expansion of the comprehensive building and the national national ethnomedicine clinical research base on the basis of the inpatient department of the Tibetan Hospital will also increase the basic research building of Tibetan medicine, Tibetan medicine bath therapy center, medical oxygen chamber, ophthalmic center, ophthalmology and medicinal bath wards, ophthalmology operating room, ophthalmology education and training and other ancillary facilities as well as the hospital's logistical support system and other functions, and the implementation of the hospital district attached to the construction of the project.

In 2023, Tibetan Hospital of Tibet Autonomous Region became the National Center for Traditional Chinese Medicine (Tibetan medicine) preparatory units.

== See also ==
- Tibet Autonomous Region Institute of Tibetan Medicine
