= Rongpa =

Community in Himalaya

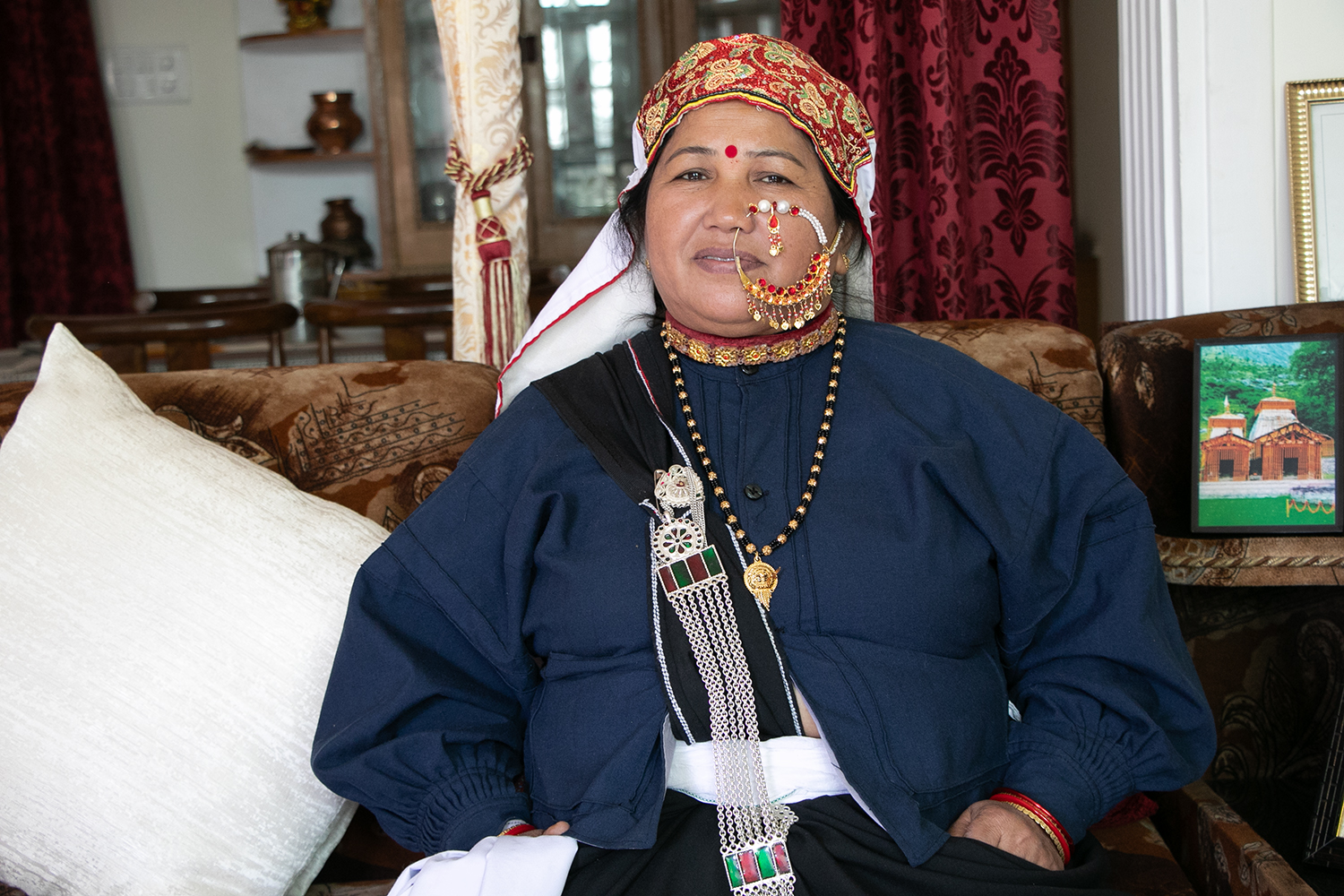
- A Rongpa woman from Uttarakhand in traditional clothing

Regions with significant populations

Languages
- Rongpa

Conversation between two Marcha-Rongpo speakers

The Rongpa (also known as Bhotiya) are a Sino Tibetan group from the trans-Himalayan region of India. They are one of the oldest native tribe of the upper Himalayan belt, close to the Tibet-Garhwal border. It was once believed that the Rongpa community had been wiped out. Their native language is Rongpa, a West Himalayish language.

== Etymology ==
Anthropological evidence suggests that the word "Rongpa" translates to "valley people". An alternative translation proposes that 'Rong' refers to a rigid valley, while 'pa' refers to the commuters. While the Rongpa have their own distinct history, tradition, and customs, they are similar to the Garhwali people.

== History ==
The Rongpas are actually Tibetan in origin but later they were Rajputized as High Caste Suryavanshi Rajputs, They traditionally speak Rongpa alongside Garhwali before Sino Tibetan war, they traded with Tibet in Tholing as well as they also traded with the Garhwal empire too, The Garhwalis traditionally calls them and Tibetans as Huniyas later they were also included within the category of Bhotiya tribes of Himalayas.

The Jadh sub-group, in particular, are among the warrior clans (Kshatriya), as they ruled the Gartang Garh, one of the 52 garh (forts) of the Garhwal Kingdom. Jadhs now reside in the Bagori, Ganeshpur and Veerpur villages of Uttarkashi. These villages have a diverse population consisting of upper caste Jadhs, Fias (alleged lower caste), Kolis (weavers of Himachal Pradesh), Khampas (natives of Tibet), Nepalis, and Garhwali's. Dialect of Jadhs is almost similar to the dialect spoken in villages of Kinnaur district (like Kanam, Nesang, Poo, etc.) of Himachal Pradesh, probably due to geographical proximity and cultural ties that still continue.

== Culture ==
The Rongpa community practices strict Hinduism. Hindu Gods and Goddesses are worshipped by the community, in hopes of gaining protection for their families and villages. However, the people of this community mainly worship Lord Shiva, Vishnu and Pandavas, apart from their Isht devs and devis. Though, Buddhist influences is also seen among them very little like Rongpas have their own local deity named Panchnaag also locally known as Feyla Dev (फैला देव) or simply Phai Lha in Tibetan, according to local beliefs Feyla Dev came from Tholing a town which also houses the Tholing monastery a devout buddhist town implying about his buddhist origins and also Rongpas also worship Bhairo Baba who's very different from mainstream Bhairava because as per local legends Bhairo came to Uttarakhand from Hun Desh (Tibet) by two brothers from Tamta (Koli community) from the guru Huniya Lama (A Buddhist Monk) implying the cult of Bhairo among the locals likely have a clear origins from Mahakala but overtime slight evolution too happened. Though among the Rongpa community The Jadh Khampas follow a syncretic mixture of both Hinduism and Buddhism.

Rongpas historically preferred to marry within their own community, though recently inter-community marriage has become common.

Short oral history of Rongpa language and culture by native speaker

=== Attire ===
The traditional dress worn by the people of Bhotia is made with layers of wool, designed to provide warmth during the cold winters. Women traditionally wear a woolen skirt, shirt, waistcoat, or overcoat. They usually adorn their necks, ears, and noses with beads and rings of gold or silver. The men typically wear trousers over which they layer a loose gown tied to the waist with a cloth, called a patta. They may also don a woollen cap.

== See also ==
- Bhotiya
- Jad people
