= Mentsikhang =

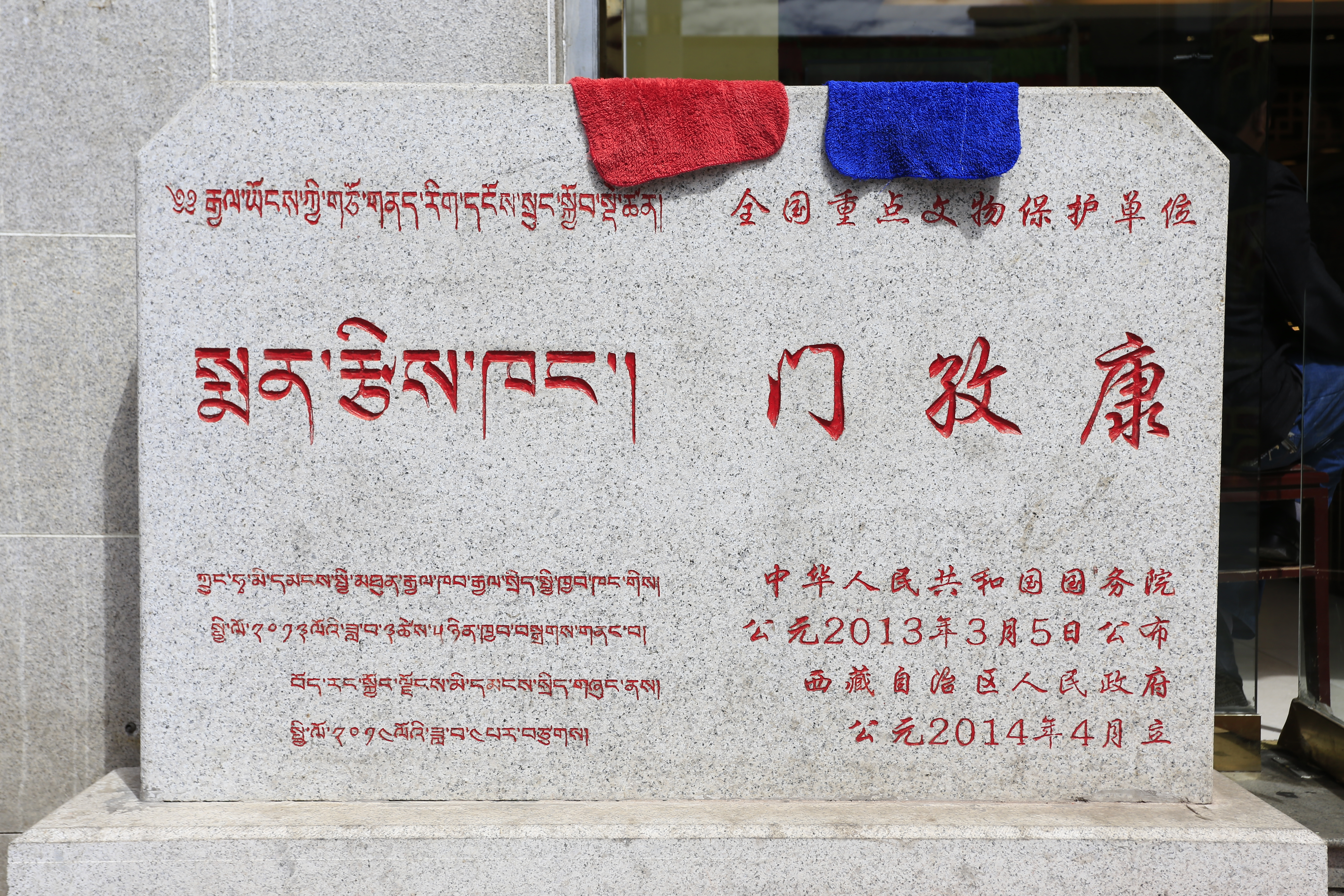
Tablet for National Cultural Relics Protection Unit

Mentsikhang (门孜康, Tibetan: སྨན་རྩིས་ཁང་, Wylie transcription: sman rtsis khang, THL: men tsi khang), translated as Tibetan Medical Calendar College or Medical Astrological College, was a hospital and medical school. It was located in Lhasa, Tibet Autonomous Region. In 1959, Mentsikhang merged with the former Chagpori to form the Lhasa Tibetan Medicine Hospital, which was transformed into the Tibetan Hospital of the Tibet Autonomous Region in 1980.

== History ==
In Tibetan, "men" means "medical", "tsi" refers to "calendar", thus "mentsikhang" means "medical calendar hospital". In Tibetan medicine theory, human body condition is influenced by astronomical changes, and the growth and efficacy of Tibetan medicinal plants is influenced by seasonal changes, so traditional Tibetan medicine is heavily connected to the Tibetan calendar.

With approval of the 13th Lama, in 1916, Tekhang Jampa Thubwang established the Mentsikhang. Thubwang designated his close disciple Khyenrab Norbu as director but took sole responsibility for its administration and overall development. Mentsikhang was an outcome of the 13th Lama's attempt to shift power away from big monasteries to the Kashag. The building has an east–west layout, the door facing south, two story high, 66 meters long (now 60 meters), 18 meters wide. It has an outpatient department and a Tibetan medicine research and teaching center. The east and west ends of the second story are living spaces of the director and vice director. Director Khyenrab Norbu lived in the west end, the vice director lived in the east end, and the middle rooms are the research and teaching departments. The two ends of the lower floor are for other doctors' living spaces, the center for a spacious teaching room. The hospital had a total of five professors, including two for Tibetan medicine, two for astronomy and calendar, one for ophthalmology. The army, monasteries, and aristocratic families had to send quotas of students to Mentsikhang, and trained amchi were sent back to needy communities and monasteries after completing their training. Anthropologist Martin Saxer wrote that "probably for the first time in Tibetan history, a state-sponsored public healthcare system started to sprout".

Khyenrab Norbu became a monk in Tsedang Atsurin at an early age. Later, because of his outstanding talent, he was sent by the old lama of the monastery to study Tibetan medicine at Chagpori. He started his medical studies under Sera physician Ngawang Choeden and later sought education on medicine, astrology, and other fields of Tibetan studies from physicians and scholars like Tekhang Jampa Thubwang, Dorjee Gyaltsen, Jampal Rolpai Lodoe, Lama Ugyen Tenzim of Sikkim, Lama Tenzin Gyaltsen of Kinnaur, Chikchar Dungzin Rinpoche of Tsari, and others. Khyenrab Norbu mainly studied medicine and calendars, and also learned other cultural knowledge. In 1912, Norbu became a doctor in Drepung Monastery. Later, he became the first director of Mentsikhang. Thereafter, he recruited many young students from monasteries, soldiers, and farmers and herdsmen throughout Tibet for training, and successively trained more than a thousand students, contributing greatly to the development of Tibetan medicine.

In 1959, Mentsikhang merged with the former Chagpori to form the Lhasa Tibetan Medicine Hospital, which was transformed into the Tibetan Hospital of the Tibet Autonomous Region in 1980. In terms of hardware, the government had allocated 230,000 yuan to remodel a number of tin houses and move the outpatient clinic to the front of the old Mentsikhang building for the convenience of the public. In 1976, the government further allocated 1.21 million yuan to construct a new outpatient clinic building.

== Gallery ==
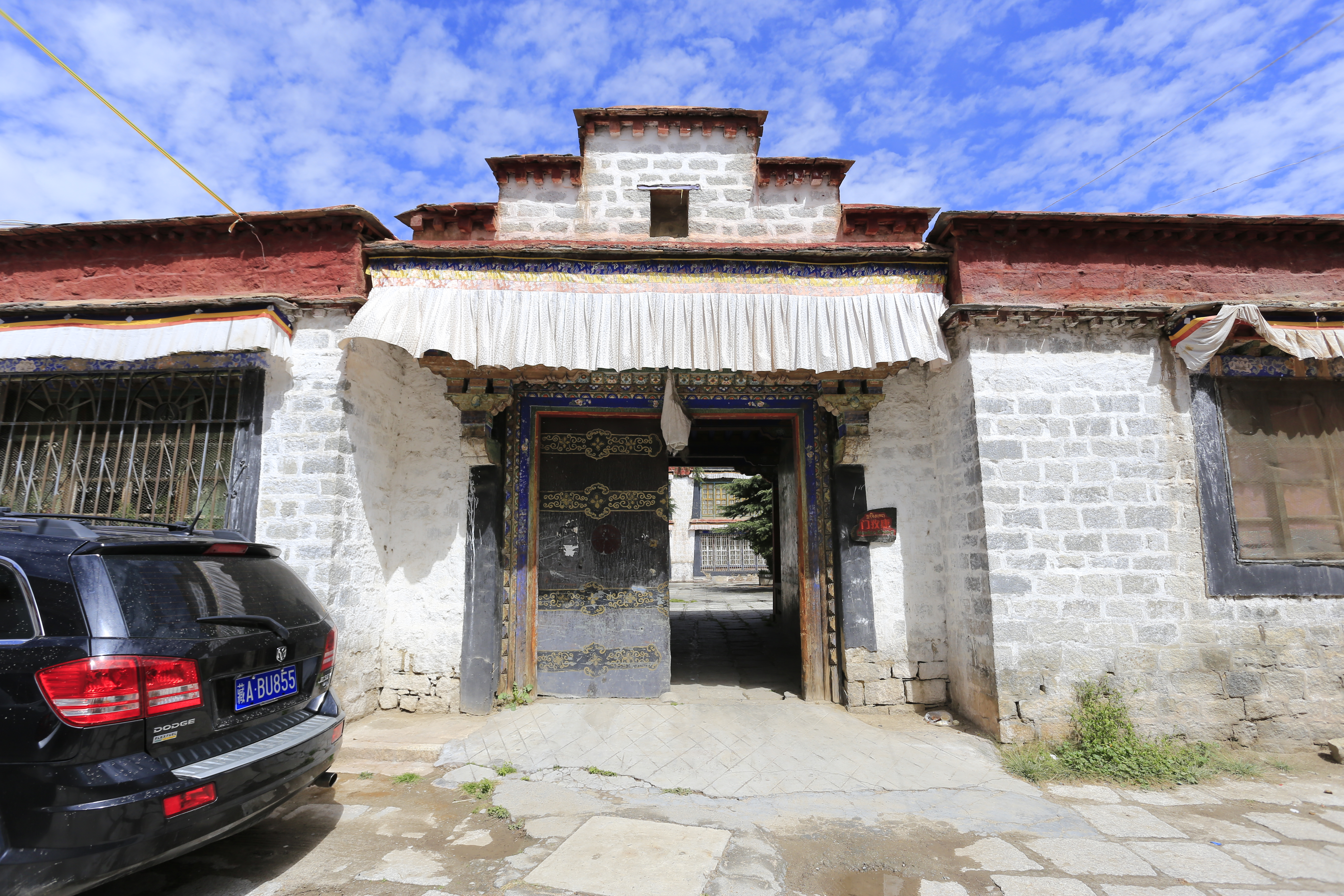
Entrance

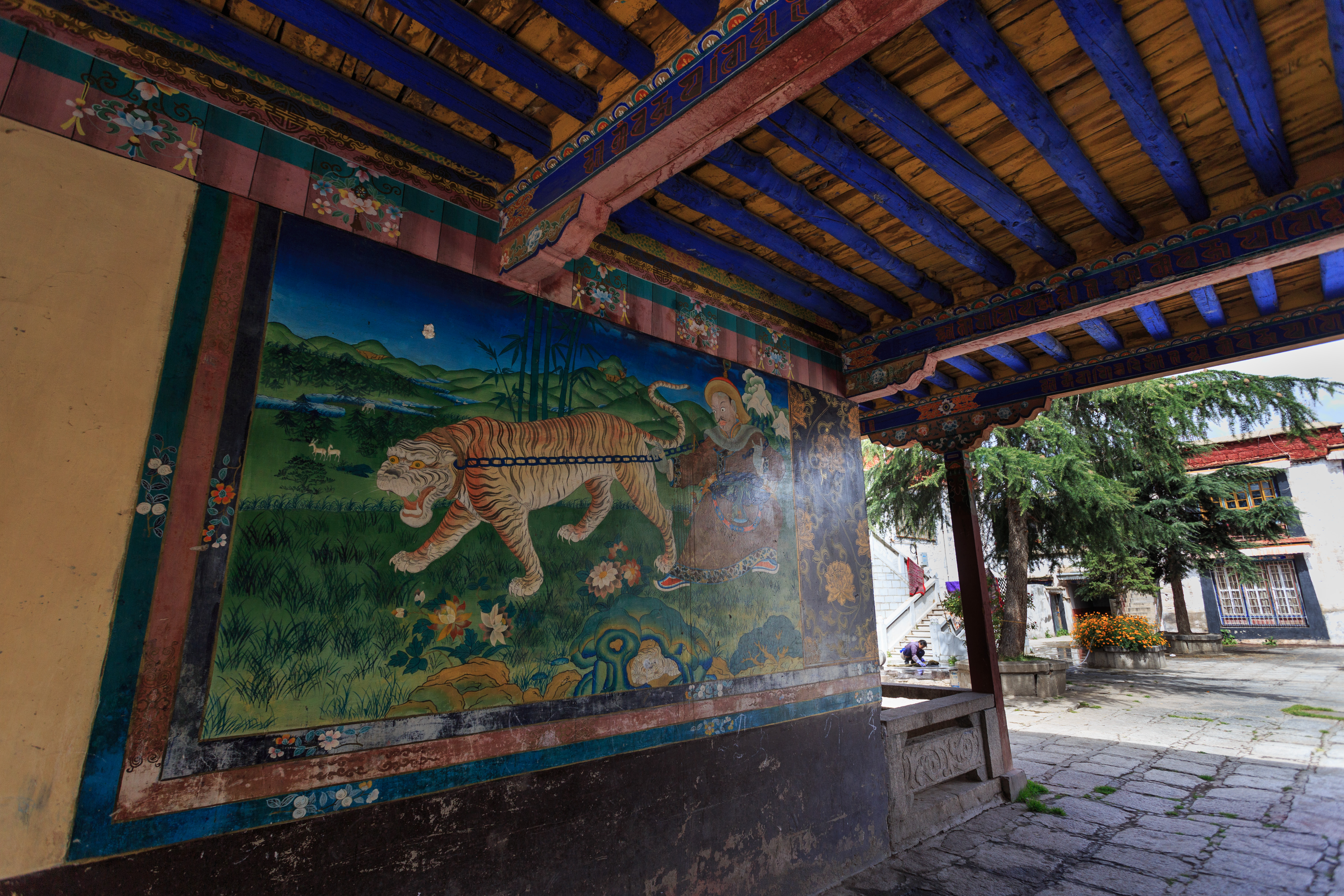
Foyer

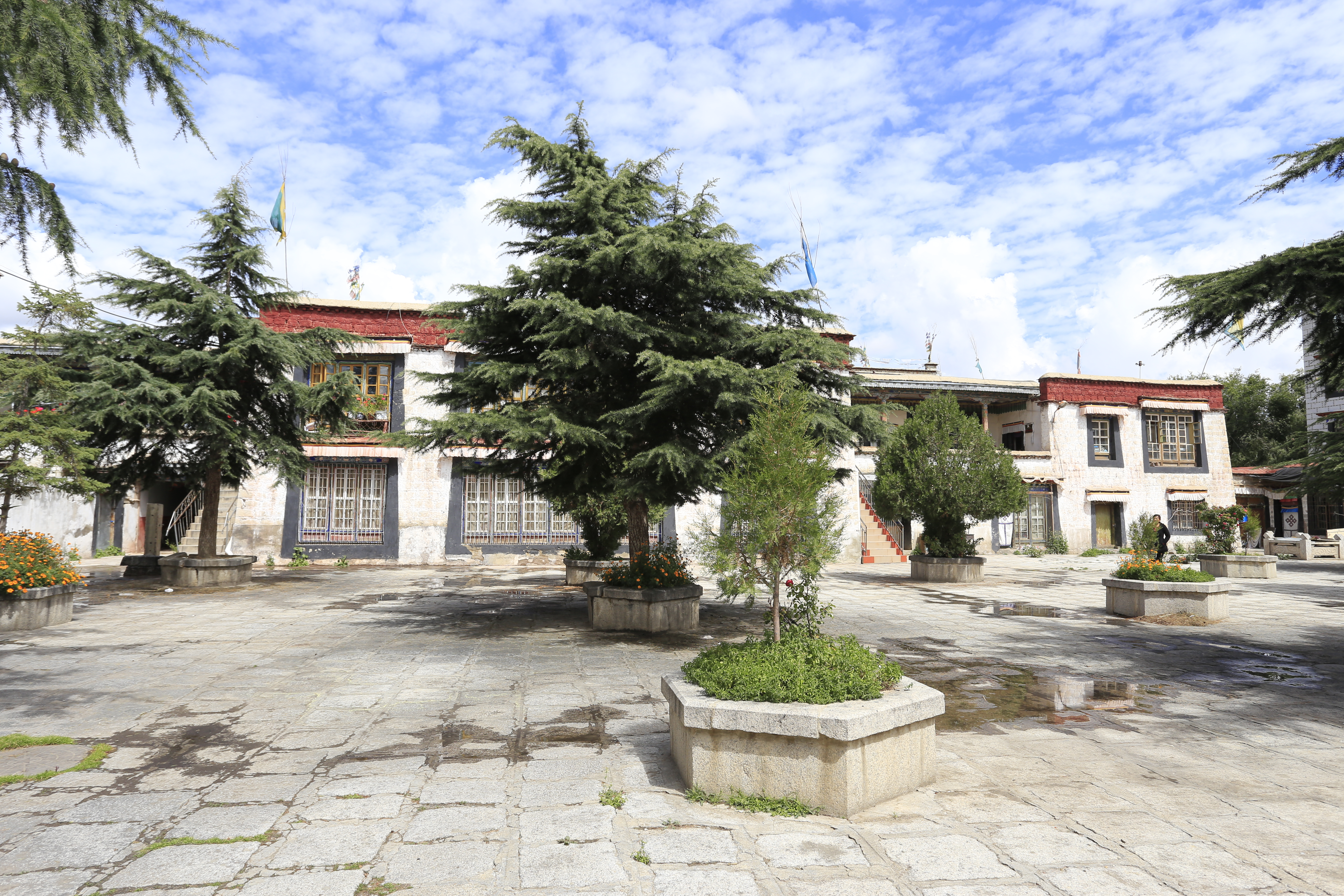
Inner courtyard

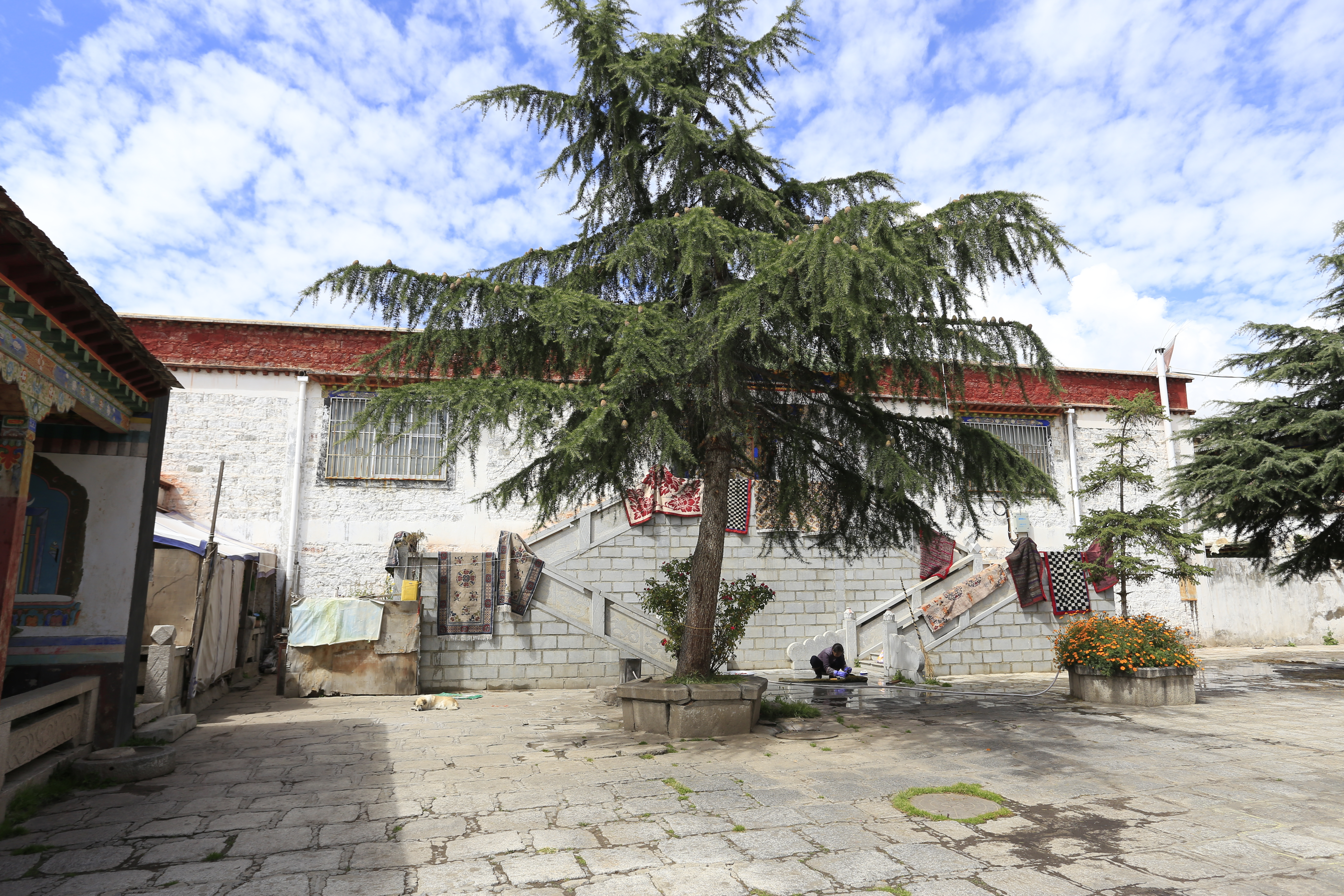
Inner courtyard
