= Tibet Autonomous Region Institute of Tibetan Medicine =

Tibet Autonomous Region Institute of Tibetan Medicine (Chinese: 西藏自治区藏医药研究院) is an institute of Tibetan medicine.

== History ==
The Tibetan Medicine Research Institute of the Tibet Autonomous Region is a Tibetan medicine research institute under the Tibetan Hospital of the Tibet Autonomous Region (TAR), located in Lhasa, Tibet Autonomous Region, China. It was founded in 1974 as the Institute of Tibetan Medicine and the Institute of Astronomy and Calendars of the Tibet Autonomous Region, and was initially engaged in the research of Tibetan medicine literature and the editing of astronomical almanacs. Later, the institute was renamed as the Tibetan Medicine Research Institute of the Tibet Autonomous Region Tibetan Hospital, and became an autonomous regional-level professional scientific research unit engaged in the study of Tibetan medicine.

== See also ==
- Tibetan Hospital of the Tibet Autonomous Region
