= Niti Valley =

Remote valley located in Uttarakhand, India

Niti Valley is a remote valley located in the Chamoli district of Uttarakhand, India at a height of 3,600 m (11,811 ft). The geographic location is approximately at 30° 55′ 12″ N latitude and 79° 39′ 36″ E longitude. It is close to the Chinese border and Niti is the last village in the valley before the border with south Tibet. The valley is located approximately 90 kilometres (56 mi) from Joshimath. The Niti Pass was an ancient trade route between India and Tibet, and it was sealed after the 1962 Sino-Indian War. Since then, the border has remained sealed.

The villages in the valley include Lata, Kaga, Dronagiri, Garpak, Malari, Bampa, Gamshali and Niti. They are mostly inhabited by Bhotiyas of Uttarakhand of Chamoli district, namely Marchas and Tolcchas, both are known as Rongpa. The language spoken by Marchas is mix of Tibetan and Garhwali , while Tolcchas speak Garhwali Rongpa . Due to adverse weather conditions in the winter, the villages in the valley are only hospitable for about six to eight months. Villagers migrate to lower regions during the winters. Various medicinal plants and herbs grow in the valley that have been mentioned in the Charak Samhita, an ancient treatise on Ayurveda.

== Shiva Temple ==
Between the villages of Gamshali and Niti, there is a cave temple dedicated to Lord Shiva known as Timmersain Mahadev.

== See also ==
- India-China Border Roads
- List of mountains in India
- List of mountain passes of India
