= Sunam language =

Sino-Tibetan language of India

Sunam
- sunnampakad
- Region: Himachal Pradesh
- Native speakers: 390 (2020)
- Language family: Sino-Tibetan: Tibeto-Kanauri ?; West Himalayish; Kinnauri; Thebor; Sunam

Language codes
- ISO 639-3: ssk
- Glottolog: suna1241

Sunam is an underdocumented Sino-Tibetan language spoken in Sunnam village, Kinnaur district, Himachal Pradesh, India.

== Language situation ==
Sunam is spoken by the upper caste Scheduled Tribe community of Sunnam that makes up about 58% of the village's population. It exists in intese contact with Shumcho, a related but not mutually intelligible language spoken by the lower Scheduled Caste community in the same village, as well as regional lingua franca Kinnauri and Hindi and English that dominate the school system of Himachal Pradesh. Nepali and various Western Pahari languages are spoken by migratory laborers also present in the village.

Despite its small size and widespread multilingualism, the Sunam-speaking community has a positive attitude towards its language, which is still transmitted to children and used in all domains of daily life.
