= Bunan language =

Sino-Tibetan language of India

Bunan
- गढ़ी ,𑚌𑚗𑚷𑚯, གཌྷཱི༹
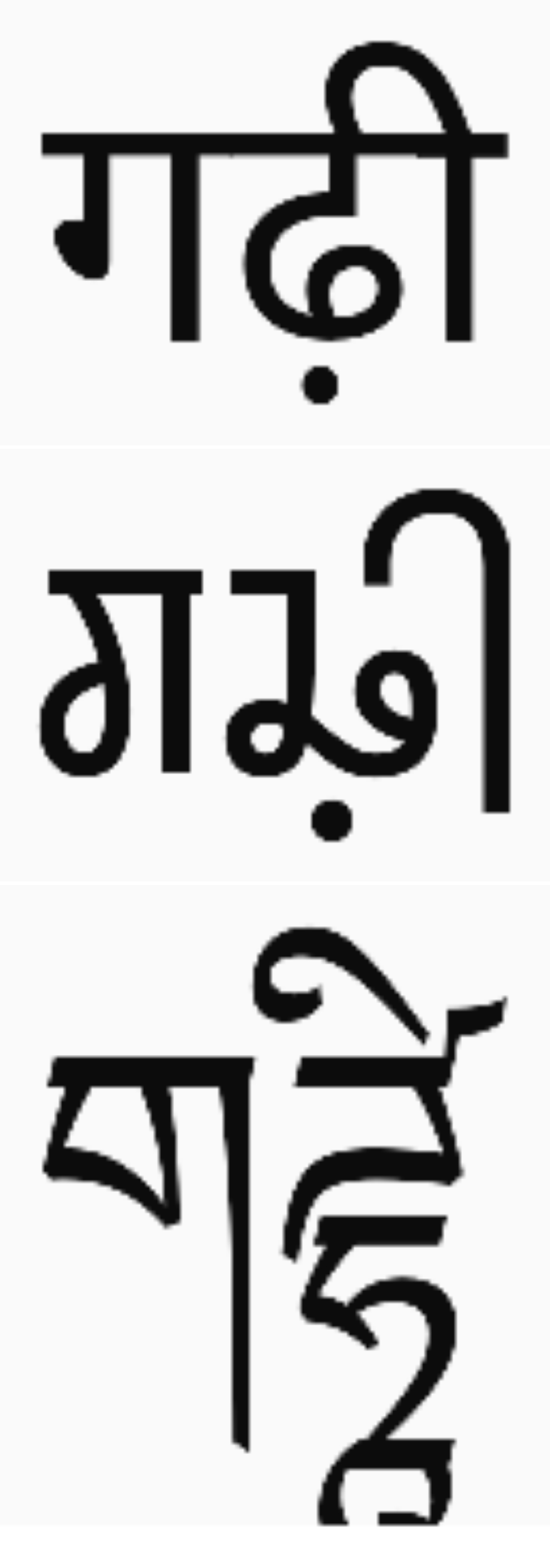
- Native to: India
- Region: Himachal Pradesh (Lahaul and Spiti)
- Native speakers: 3,800 (2014)
- Language family: Sino-Tibetan: Tibeto-Kanauri ?; West Himalayish; Bunan

Language codes
- ISO 639-3: bfu
- Glottolog: gahr1239
- ELP: Gahri

Bunan, also known as Gahri, Ghara, Lahuli of Bunan, Boonan, Punan, Poonan, Erankad or Keylong Boli, is a Tibeto-Burman minority language, largely spoken in the Keylong block of Lahaul and Spiti district, in the northernmost region of Himachal Pradesh, India. The number of people speaking the language is only approximately 4,000 in India. The Tibeto-Burman language family consists of fourteen languages spoken in Himachal Pradesh and Uttarakhand, and Bunan is assigned to the West Himalayish branch.

== Status ==
The Endangered Languages Project classifies it as a ‘threatened’ language due to the changing economic landscape of the Lahaul region and the migration of Bunan speakers to other areas of the country, especially the younger generation migrating for education and employment. In the UNESCO list of endangered languages, Bunan is mentioned as ‘definitely endangered’ from extinction.

The language has its own grammar, as documented by various scholars. The Scheme for Protection and Preservation of Endangered Languages organisation worked extensively on the documentation of the Bunan language.

Other commonly spoken languages of the Bunan community are Hindi, Tibetan, Manchad, and English. The language has 37% lexical similarity with Lahauli Tinan language, 24% lexical similarity with Lhasa Tibetan language, and 34% lexical similarity with Central Tibetan languages.

== Geographic distribution ==
According to Ethnologue, Bunan is spoken in the Gahr Valley along the Bhaga River from its confluence with the Chandra River and upstream about 25 km (16 mi).

Bunan is also spoken in Barbog, Bokar Gompa, Billing, Chhelling, Gozang, Greimas, Gumlink, Gumrang, Gyuskhar, Lepchang, Katchra, Kardang, Kardang Gompa, Mongwan, Mangmore, Namchia, Paspara, Pyaso, Pyukar, Sasure Gompa, Sikkeling, Styingri, Tayule, and Yurnad regions.

The Bunan language is sometimes confused with the Bunun language, which is spoken in Taiwan and belongs to the Austronesian language family.

== See also ==
- Bunan word list (Wiktionary)
