= Kanashi language =

Sino-Tibetan of India

Kanashi
- Region: Himachal Pradesh
- Native speakers: 1,700 (2015)
- Language family: Sino-Tibetan: Tibeto-Kanauri ?; West Himalayish; Kanashi

Language codes
- ISO 639-3: xns
- Glottolog: kana1283
- ELP: Kanashi

Kanashi is a Sino-Tibetan language spoken in the isolated Malana (Malani) village area in Kullu District, Himachal Pradesh, India. It is, to some extent mutually intelligible with other Sino-Tibetan languages like Kinnauri.

== Sociolinguistic situation ==
Currently there are roughly 1700 active speakers of Kanashi in the Malana Nala which is up from the previous estimate of 1400 in the early 2000s. Its current status to date is threatened. The village that uses this language is located roughly 10,000 feet above sea level isolated from civilization.

== Simple sentences ==
It seems apparent that speakers of Kanashi favor simple sentences over complex and compound sentences due to the sporadic usage of the later two. Kanashi speakers use both subject–verb–object order and subject–object–verb order. Being a pro normalized language, Kanashi does not require the subject and verb to be mentioned separately, particularity in 1st and 2nd person when these are incorporated in the verb form itself.

== Gender ==
In Kanashi there seems to be a lack of grammatical gender. The natural gender that has no bearing on the other constituents within an utterance is distinguished in one of two ways. The first is to use distinct terms for groups of males and females and second is by prefixing terms with the meaning father or mother to the substantive in question. In addition, gender distinction occurs only among humans – all inanimate and animate non-human objects tend to be genderless.

== Numbers ==
Kanashi tends to use mostly nouns, pronouns and verbs. Pronominal and nominal stems are inflected for two numbers, viz. singular and plural only. If desired the dual number can be indicated as "nis" for two as in two men. The absence of a plural marker indicates singularity in Kanashi however, in non formal speech the plural marker is left out too because it is inferred from the context of the sentence. Plural marker suffixes are also left out if numerals other than the numeral for one or by terms such as many, several, all, some, a few, etc. The numeral system also uses a unique form to represent a base ten system. Twenty is stated as twice ten and forty is twice twice ten.
