= Zhang-Zhung language =

Extinct Sino-Tibetan language of Tibet

Zhangzhung
- Zhang-Zhung
- Native to: Zhangzhung
- Region: Western Tibet and Central Asia
- Era: 7th–10th century
- Language family: Sino-Tibetan: Tibeto-Kanauri ?; West Himalayish; Almora; Zhangzhung
- Writing system: Marchen script; Tibetan script

Language codes
- ISO 639-3: xzh
- Glottolog: zhan1239

Zhangzhung (Tibetan: ཞང་ཞུང་, Wylie: zhang zhung) is an extinct Sino-Tibetan language that was spoken in Zhangzhung in what is now western Tibet. It is attested in a bilingual text called A Cavern of Treasures (mDzod phug) and several shorter texts.

A small number of documents preserved in Dunhuang contain an undeciphered language that has been called Old Zhangzhung, but the identification is controversial.

== A Cavern of Treasures (mDzod phug) ==
A Cavern of Treasures (Tibetan: མཛོད་ཕུག་, Wylie: mdzod phug) is a terma uncovered by Shenchen Luga (Tibetan: གཤེན་ཆེན་ཀླུ་དགའ་, Wylie: gshen chen klu dga') in the early eleventh century. Martin identifies the importance of this scripture for studies of the Zhangzhung language:

For students of Tibetan culture in general, the mDzod phug is one of the most intriguing of all Bön scriptures, since it is the only lengthy bilingual work in Zhang-zhung and Tibetan (some of the shorter but still significant sources for Zhang-zhung are signalled in Orofino 1990)."

== External relationships ==
Bradley (2002) says Zhangzhung "is now agreed" to have been a Kanauri or West Himalayish language. Guillaume Jacques (2009) rebuts earlier hypotheses that Zhangzhung might have originated in eastern (rather than western) Tibet by having determined it to be a non-Qiangic language.

Widmer (2014) classifies Zhangzhung within the eastern branch of West Himalayish, and lists the following cognates between Zhangzhung and Proto-West Himalayish.

Gloss	Zhangzhung	Proto-West Himalayish
barley	zad	*zat
blue	ting	*tiŋ-
diminutive suffix	-tse	*-tse ~ *-tsi
ear	ra tse	*re
fat	tsʰas	*tsʰos
girl	tsa med	*tsamet
god	sad	*sat
gold ?	zang	*zaŋ
heart	she	*ɕe
old (person)	shang ze	*ɕ(j)aŋ
red	mang	*maŋ
white	shi nom	*ɕi

== Scripts ==
A number of scripts are recorded as being used for writing the Zhangzhung language. These are the Marchen script and its several descendants:

- Marchen or Greater Mar script (Tibetan: སྨར་ཆེན་, Wylie: smar chen)
  - Marchung or Lesser Mar script (Tibetan: སྨར་ཆུང་, Wylie: smar chung)
  - Pungchen or Greater Pung script (Tibetan: སྤུངས་ཆེན་, Wylie: spungs chen)
  - Pungchung or Lesser Pung script (Tibetan: སྤུངས་ཆུང་, Wylie: spungs chung)
  - Drusha script (Tibetan: བྲུ་ཤ་, Wylie: bru sha)

== Old Zhangzhung ==
F. W. Thomas suggested that three undeciphered Dunhuang manuscripts in a Tibetan script were written in an older form of the Zhangzhung language. This identification has been accepted by Takeuchi Tsuguhito (武内紹人), who called the language "Old Zhangzhung" and added two further manuscripts. Two of these manuscripts are in the Stein collection of the British Library (IOL Tib J 755 (Ch. Fragment 43) and Or.8212/188) and three in the Pelliot collection of the Bibliothèque Nationale (Pelliot tibétain 1247, 1251 and 1252). In each case, the relevant text is written on the reverse side of a scroll containing an earlier Chinese Buddhist text. The texts are written in a style of Tibetan script dating from the late 8th or early 9th centuries. Takeuchi and Nishida claim to have partially deciphered the documents, which they believe to be separate medical texts. However, David Snellgrove, and more recently Dan Martin, have rejected Thomas's identification of the language of these texts as a variant of Zhangzhung.

== See also ==
- List of extinct languages of Asia
- Tibeto-Kanauri languages
- Zhang Zhung
- Bön
