= Kanda, Bajhang =

Village Development Committee in Seti Zone, Nepal

Kanda
- Village Development Committee
- Interactive map of Kanda
- Country: Nepal
- Zone: Seti Zone
- District: Bajhang District

Population (1991)
  - Total: 1,417
  - Religions: Hindu
- Time zone: UTC+5:45 (Nepal Time)

Kanda is a village Development Committee in Bajhang District in the Seti Zone of north-western Nepal. At the time of the 1991 Nepal census it had a population of 1,417 and had 268 houses in the village.
