= Kinnauri language =

Sino-Tibetan dialect cluster centered on Himachal Pradesh, India

Kinnauri
- 𑚊𑚝𑚦𑚤𑚮𑚎𑚨𑚶𑚊𑚛, Kanawaringskad, ཀནབརིངསྐད
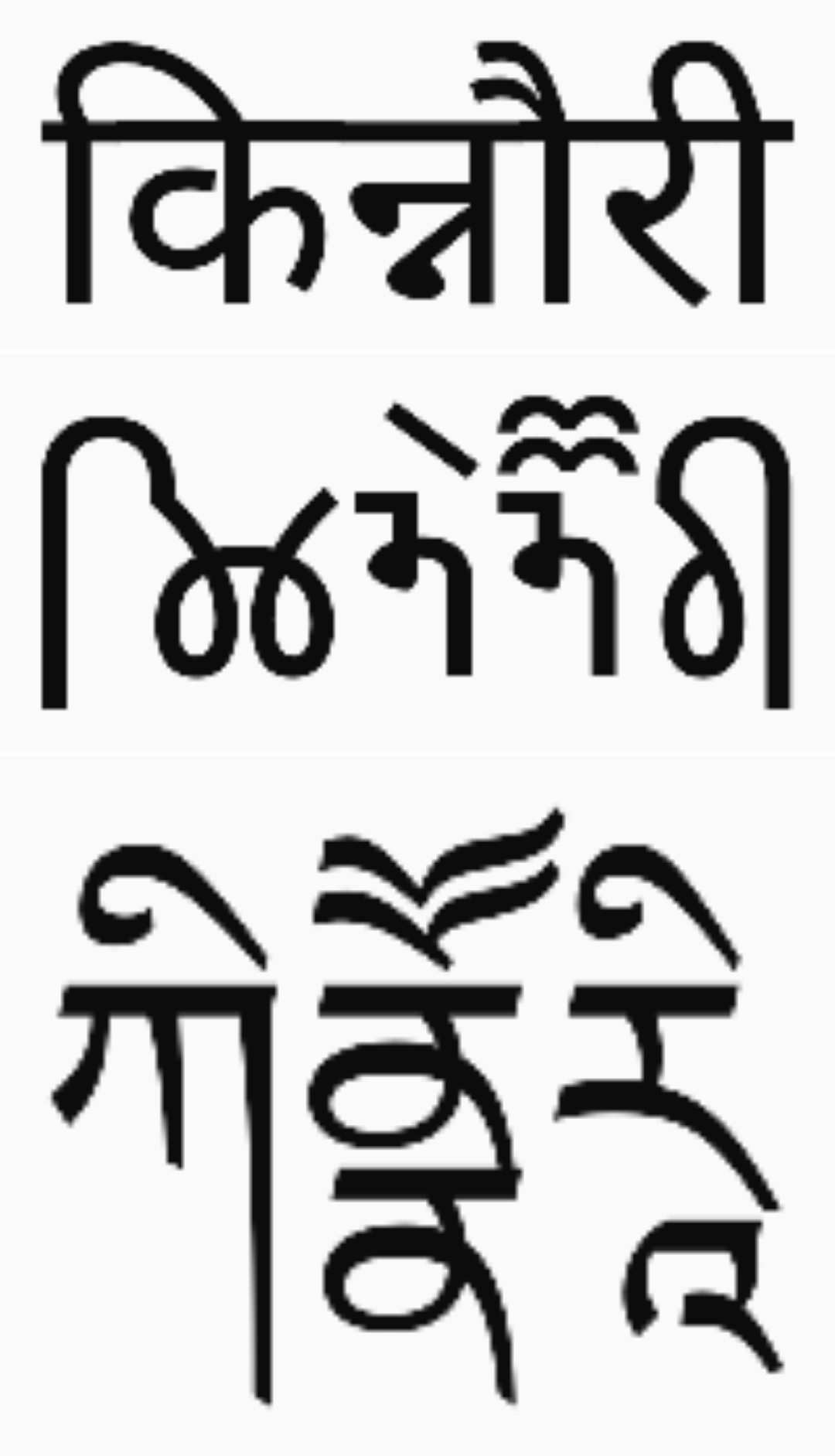
- Region: Himachal Pradesh
- Native speakers: all Kinnauri varieties: 84,000; Kinnauri proper: about 45,000 (2011 census)
- Language family: Sino-Tibetan: Tibeto-Kanauri ?; West Himalayish; Kanauri; Kinnauri
- Dialects: Sunam

Language codes
- ISO 639-3: Variously: kfk – Kinnauri proper cik – Chitkuli Kinnauri ssk – Sunam (Thebor) jna – Jangshung (Thebor) scu – Shumcho (Thebor)
- Glottolog: kinn1250
- ELP: Kinnauri
- Jangshung

Kinnauri is the most widely used language in Kinnaur. The languages have seen different nomenclatures in written literature. Kinnauri was mentioned as Kunawaree (Gerard 1842, Cunninham 1844), Kanauri (Konow 1905), Kanawari (Bailey 1909) and Kunawari (Grierson 1909). It is the language of the upper castes in lower Kinnaur. It is also spoken in Moorang tehsil and, Ropa and Giabong villages in upper Kinnaur. It is a Sino-Tibetan dialect cluster centered on the Kinnaur district of the Indian state of Himachal Pradesh.

Kaike, once thought to be Kinnauri, is closer to Tamangic. Bhoti Kinnauri and Tukpa (locally called Chhoyuli) are Bodish (Lahauli–Spiti).

== Linguistic varieties and geographical distribution ==
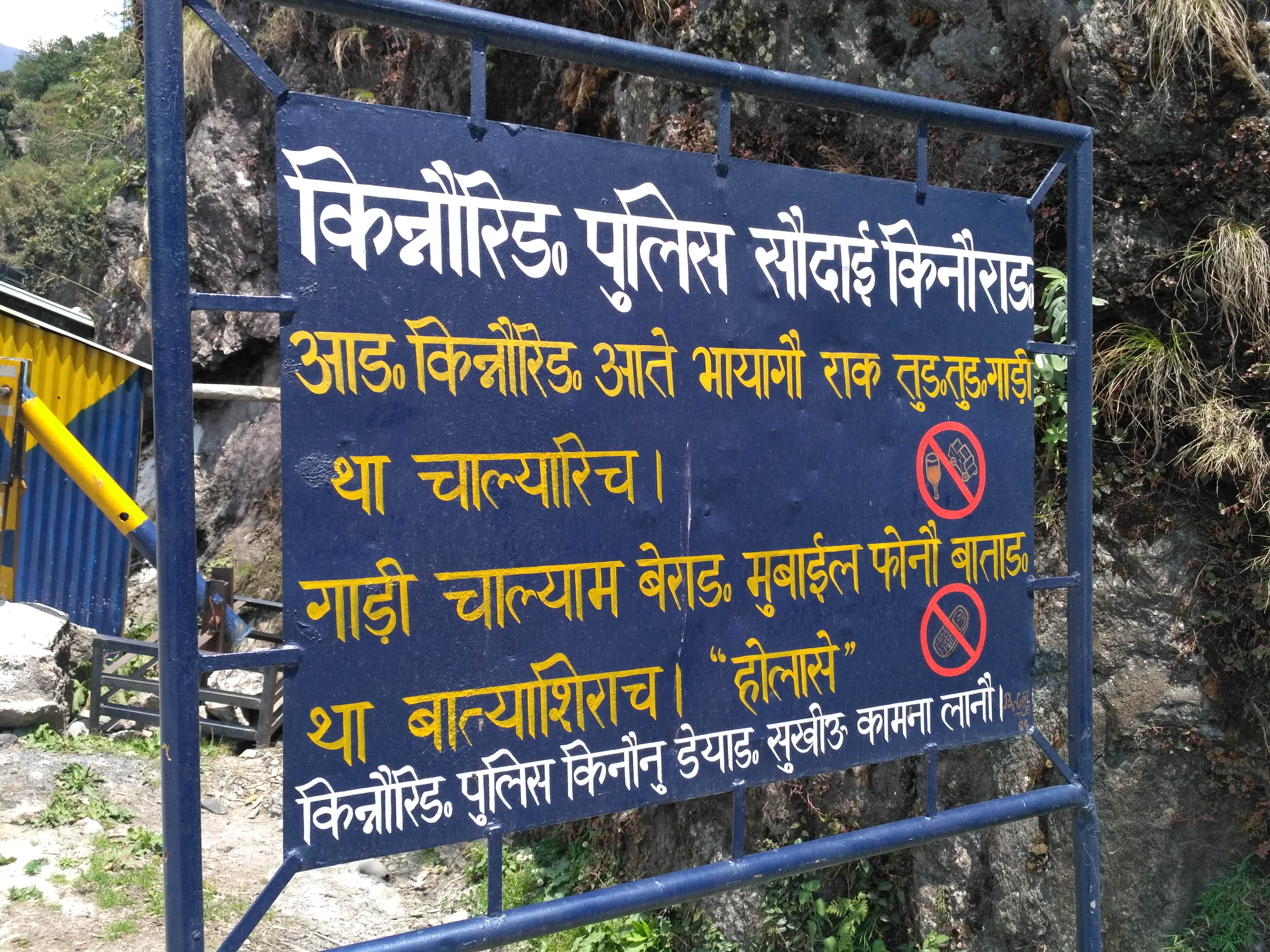
A signboard in Kinnauri Language

Kinnaur has nearly ten linguistic varieties, with Kinnauri being the major language. Ethnologue lists the following locations for Kinnauri proper and related languages.

Kinnauri is spoken in the villages from Badhal Rampur Bushahr to Sangla and north along Satluj river to Morang. Mainly the Kinnauri-speaking area is located in lower parts of Kinnaur district in Himachal Pradesh. The estimated population of Kinnauri speaking people is 45,000.

Chitkuli Kinnauri is spoken by a thousand people in the Baspa river area of the Sangla valley in Nichar subdivision, Kinnaur district, Himachal Pradesh (in Chitkul and Rakchham villages).

Jangshung is spoken in Morang tehsil, Kinnaur district, Himachal Pradesh (in Jangi, Lippa, and Asrang villages). These villages have a population of nearly 2600.

Sumcho is spoken in Poo tehsil, Kinnaur district, Himachal Pradesh (in Kanam, Labrang, Spilo, Shyaso, Taling, and Rushkaling villages) by a population of 2500.

Bhoti Kinnauri is spoken in Poo division of upper Kinnaur. The language shows slight phonemic variations in the valley. Main varieties are spoken in Poo Hangrang and Nako villages. It is a generic Tibetan language spoken by nearly 7000 people.

Chhoyuli is a Tibetic language spoken in Nesang and Kunnu Charan villages of Poo division in upper Kinnaur. It has a population of around 700. The language is considered a variety of Bhoti Kinnauri but is shows enough characteristics to stand as an independent language.

Sunnami language is spoken in Sunnam village of Poo division in upper Kinnaur. It has a population of about 700.

Pahari Kinnauri is an Indo-Aryan language of Kinnaur spoken mainly by the scheduled caste community of Nichar, Kalpa, Sangla and Moorang tehsils in Kinnaur. It has a population of 9000.

In absence of a detailed sociolinguistic survey on language use, the actual number of fluent speakers of KLs is unknown. The actual number of speakers is much lower than the total population. Census data include native as well as the non native and the migratory workers in the survey.

== Phonology ==
This description is of the Pangi dialect of Kinnauri.

=== Consonants ===
		Bilabial	Alveolar	Retroflex	Palatal	Velar	Glottal
Nasal		m	n		ɲ	ŋ	
Plosive	voiced	b	d	ɖ		ɡ	
Plosive	voiceless	p	t	ʈ		k	
Plosive	aspirated	pʰ	tʰ	ʈʰ		kʰ	
Affricate	voiced		dz		dʒ		
Affricate	voiceless		ts		tʃ		
Affricate	aspirated		tsʰ		tʃʰ		
Fricative			s		ʃ		h
Trill			r				
Approximant			l		j	w	

Note on palatals: /dʒ/, /tʃ/, /tʃʰ/, and /ʃ/ are post-alveolar. /ɲ/ is alveolo-palatal.

=== Vowels ===
Kinnauri has six pairs of long/short vowels:

	Front	Central	Back
Close	i	ɨ	u
Mid	e		o
Open		a	

=== Syllables ===
/h/, aspirated obstruents (i.e. /pʰ/, /tʰ/, /ʈʰ/, /kʰ/, /t͡sʰ/, /t͡ʃʰ/), and glides (i.e. /w/, /j/) do not occur in syllable codas.

All consonants may occur in onsets and word-medially.

Kinnauri has the following types of syllables:

- (C)V(C)(C)(C)
- CCV(C)
- CCCVC

== Grammar ==
Word order in Kinnari is SOV, it is a postpositional language, it shows agreement in person number features, adjective precedes head in the noun phrase, modifiers precede the head noun, causative occurs after main verb, marker of comparison follows the standard of comparison, negatives are pre-verbal, auxiliary follows the main verb, anaphor follows the antecedent and main clause precedes the subordinate clause.

=== Morphology ===
==== Nominal ====
===== Number =====
Kinnauri distinguishes two numbers on nominals: singular unmarked and plural -aː/-oː/-eː. In some lexical items with open syllable, plurality is indicated by simply lengthening the final vowel. Natural terms like "sky", "water", "cloud", "moon" etc. do not take the plural marker.

===== Case =====
Case suffixes generally attach to the right most element of the NP, although they may appear attached to headless NP, i.e. numerals or adjectives.

- Nominative -Ø
- Ergative/instrumental -is/-s
- Dative -u/pəŋ (Singular), -n(u) (Plural)
- Genitive -u (Singular), -n(u) (Plural)
- Locative -o (Singular), -n(o) (Plural) -r (DEM)
- Ablative -tʃ
- Comitative (-)rəŋ

The ergative and instrumental are homophonic and may co-occur in the same NP:

radʰa-s gas-oː ti-s tʃi-o
Radha-ERG cloth-PL water-INS wash-PST
'Radha washed clothes with water.'

===== Proforms =====
		singular	dual	plural
1st person	exclusive	gə (NOM), aŋ (NNOM)	kiʃan	niŋo
1st person	inclusive	gə (NOM), aŋ (NNOM)	kiʃan	kiʃa
2nd person (NHON)		ka	kaniʃ	kano, kanegoː
2nd person (HON)		ki	kiʃi, kisi	kino, *kinogoː
3rd person	Anaphoric	an	anegsuŋ	anegoː
3rd person	Proximal	dʒo	dʒoksuŋ	dʒogoː
3rd person	Distant visible	no	noksuŋ	nogoː
3rd person	Distant nonvisible	do	doksuŋ	dogoː

===== Numerals =====
	Kinnauri number
1	id
2	niʃ
3	ʃum, sum
4	pə
5	ŋa
6	ʈug, rug
7	(s)tiʃ
8	re
9	sgui
10	se
11	sigid
20	nidza
100	ra
1000	hadzar

===== Adjectives =====
Adjectives can function attributively and predicatively. In attributive constructions, the adjectives are placed before the nouns that they modify. E.g. ɖaldis mi "poor man", ɖalɖis tsʰesmi "poor woman". In predicative function, adjective may or may not require a copular verb.

== Script ==
The native script of the language is a variety of Takri script.

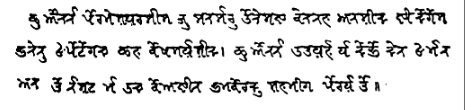
A specimen in Kinnauri Takri

== Language vitality ==
Kinnaura people are bilinguals who speak Hindi along with their mother tongue. Hindi is the main lingua franca for people from different language groups in Kinnaur. It is also the main language in schools, colleges, government offices, market place, banks and more such domains. Younger generation is exposed to entertainment media like movies, music, mobile phone, newspapers etc., in Hindi. Kinnauri songs beings produced show heavy influence of Hindi. Young learners are encouraged to learn and speak Hindi in order to benefit in education and employment in future. Fluent speakers of Kinnauri are only the elders or the mid aged people who have little exposure to the outer world or are still unaffected by the modernity. But whether the next generation will inherit the cultural knowledge or the legacy of ancestors is doubted. From UNESCO factors study, all languages in Kinnaur region are definitely endangered, inter-generational transmission is unsafe, number of speakers using Kinnauri as first language is very low, domains are shifting, Hindi is replacing Kinnauri in most domains, there is lack of literary traditions, government support towards the protection and promotion of Kinnaur language or culture is absent, very little is known about the linguistic structure of the languages in the region. Like other tribal languages, Kinnauri too may lose much of its linguistic characteristics due to lack of proper documentation and government support and community apathy as well. Among urgent measures, Kinnauri languages need community collaborative efforts to document and discuss among the locals, scholars, linguists and researchers.

== See also ==
- Kanashi language of Malana, Himachal Pradesh, mutually intelligible with Kinnauri

== Bibliography ==
- Nagano, Yasuhiko; LaPolla, Randy J., eds. (2001). New research on Zhangzhung and related Himalayan languages. Bon studies. Vol. 3. Osaka: National Museum of Ethnology.
- Negi, Harvinder Kumar. (2023). Language use, prestige and vitality of languages in kinnaur (https://www.academia.edu/105610420/LANGUAGE_USE_PRESTIGE_AND_VITALITY_OF_LANGUAGES_IN_KINNAUR). International Journal of Dravidian Linguistics.
- Negi, Harvinder Kumar. (2021). Languages of kannaura tribe (https://www.academia.edu/50932512/Languages_of_kannaura_tribe). Languages of INDIAN HIMALAYAS, .
- Negi, Harvinder (2012). "A Sociolinguistic profile of the Kinnaura tribe" (PDF). Nepalese Linguistics. 27: 101–105. Archived from the original (PDF) on 8 October 2024.
- Nishi 西, Yoshio 義郎 (1993a). "カナウル語" [Kanauru language]. In 亀井 Kamei, 孝 Takashi; 河野 Kōno, 六郎 Rokurō; 千野 Chino, 栄一 Eichi (eds.). 三省堂言語学大辞典 The Sanseido Encyclopaedia of Linguistics (in Japanese). Vol. 5. Tokyo: 三省堂 Sanseido Press. pp. 75b–86b. ISBN 4385152144.
- Perumalsamy, P (2022). "Kinnauri language". Linguistic Survey of India. Vol. Himachal Pradesh. New Delhi: Language Division, Office of the Registrar General India. pp. 935–1028.
- Takahashi, Yoshiharu (2001). "A descriptive study of Kinnauri (Pangi dialect): A preliminary report". In Nagano, Yasuhiko; LaPolla, Randy J. (eds.). New research on Zhangzhung and related Himalayan languages. Vol. 19. Osaka: National Museum of Ethnology. pp. 97–119. doi:10.15021/00002143.
- Takahashi, Yoshiharu (2007). "On the deictic patterns in Kinnauri (Pangi dialect)". In Bielmeier, Roland; Haller, Felix (eds.). Linguistics of the Himalayas and beyond. Mouton de Gruyter. pp. 341–354.
- Takahashi, Yoshiharu (2009). Nagano, Yasuhiko (ed.). "On the Verbal Affixes in West Himalayan". Senri Ethnological Studies. 75: Issues in Tibeto-Burman Historical Linguistics: 21–49. doi:10.15021/00002556. ISSN 0387-6004.
- Takahashi, Yoshiharu (2012). Nakamura, Wataru; Kikusawa, Ritsuko (eds.). "On a Middle Voice Suffix in Kinnauri (Pangi dialect) Yoshiharu". Senri Ethnological Studies. 77 (77): 157–175. doi:10.15021/00002533.
