= Zhangzhung =

Ancient kingdom in western Tibet

Zhangzhung ཞང་ཞུང་
- c. 500 BC–625 AD
- General location of Zhangzhung, with contemporary neighbouring polities c. AD 500
- Capital: Kyunglung
- Common languages: Zhang-Zhung language
- Religion: Bön
- Government: Monarchy
- Tsenpo
- Historical era: Iron Age to Classical Antiquity
  - Established: c. 500 BC
  - Conquest by Songtsen Gampo: 625 AD
| Preceded by | Succeeded by |
| Neolithic Tibet | Yarlung dynasty; Tibetan Empire |
- Today part of: China; India; Nepal

- Zhangzhung

Tibetan name
- Tibetan: ཞང་ཞུང་
Transcriptions
- Lhasa IPA: ɕaŋɕuŋ

Chinese name
- Chinese: 象雄
Transcriptions
Standard Mandarin
- Hanyu Pinyin: Xiàngxióng

Zhangzhung or Shangshung was an ancient kingdom existing from about 500 BC to 625 AD when it was conquered by the Tibetan Empire to its east. Zhangzhung people were mentioned frequently in ancient Tibetan texts as the original rulers of the area around Mount Kailash. Zhangzhung culture is associated with the Bon religion, which influenced the philosophies and practices of Tibetan Buddhism.

== Extent ==
Tradition has it that Zhangzhung consisted "of three different regions: sGob-ba, the outer; Phug-pa, the inner; and Bar-ba, the middle. The outer is what we might call Western Tibet, from Gilgit in the west to Dangs-ra khyung-rdzong in the east, next to lake gNam-mtsho, and from Khotan in the north to Chu-mig brgyad-cu rtsa-gnyis in the south. Ladakh, including Lahaul and Spiti, was part of sGob-ba. The inner region is said to be sTag-gzig (Tazig) [often identified with Bactria], and the middle rGya-mkhar bar-chod, a place not yet identified." While it is not certain whether Zhangzhung was really so large, it was an independent kingdom and covered the whole of what is today's Western Tibet, Ladakh and Gilgit.

The capital city of Zhangzhung was called Khyunglung (Wylie: Khyunglung Ngülkhar or Wylie: Khyung-lung dngul-mkhar), the "Silver Palace of Garuda", southwest of Mount Kailash (Mount Ti-se), which is identified with palaces found in the upper Sutlej Valley.

According to Rolf Alfred Stein, author of Tibetan Civilization, the area of Zhangzhung was not historically a part of Tibet and was a distinctly foreign territory to the Tibetans:

... then further west, the Tibetans encountered a distinctly foreign nation. – Shangshung, with its capital at Khyunglung. Mt. Kailāśa (Tise) and Lake Manasarovar formed part of this country., whose language has come down to us through early documents. Though still unidentified, it seems to be Indo European .... Geographically the country was certainly open to India, both through Nepal and by way of Kashmir and Ladakh. Kailāśa is a holy place for the Indians, who make pilgrimages to it. No one knows how long they have done so, but the cult may well go back to the times when Shangshung was still independent of Tibet. How far Shangshung stretched to the north, east and west is a mystery .... We have already had an occasion to remark that Shangshung, embracing Kailāśa sacred Mount of the Hindus, may once have had a religion largely borrowed from Hinduism. The situation may even have lasted for quite a long time. In fact, about 950, the Hindu King of Kabul had a statue of Vişņu, of the Kashmiri type (with three heads), which he claimed had been given him by the king of the Bhota (Tibetans) who, in turn had obtained it from Kailāśa.

== History ==
=== Possible Iron Age culture ===
Archeological work on the Chang Tang plateau in 2010 found possible evidence of an Iron Age culture in the area which some have tentatively identified as that of the Zhangzhung.

=== Conquest of Zhangzhung ===
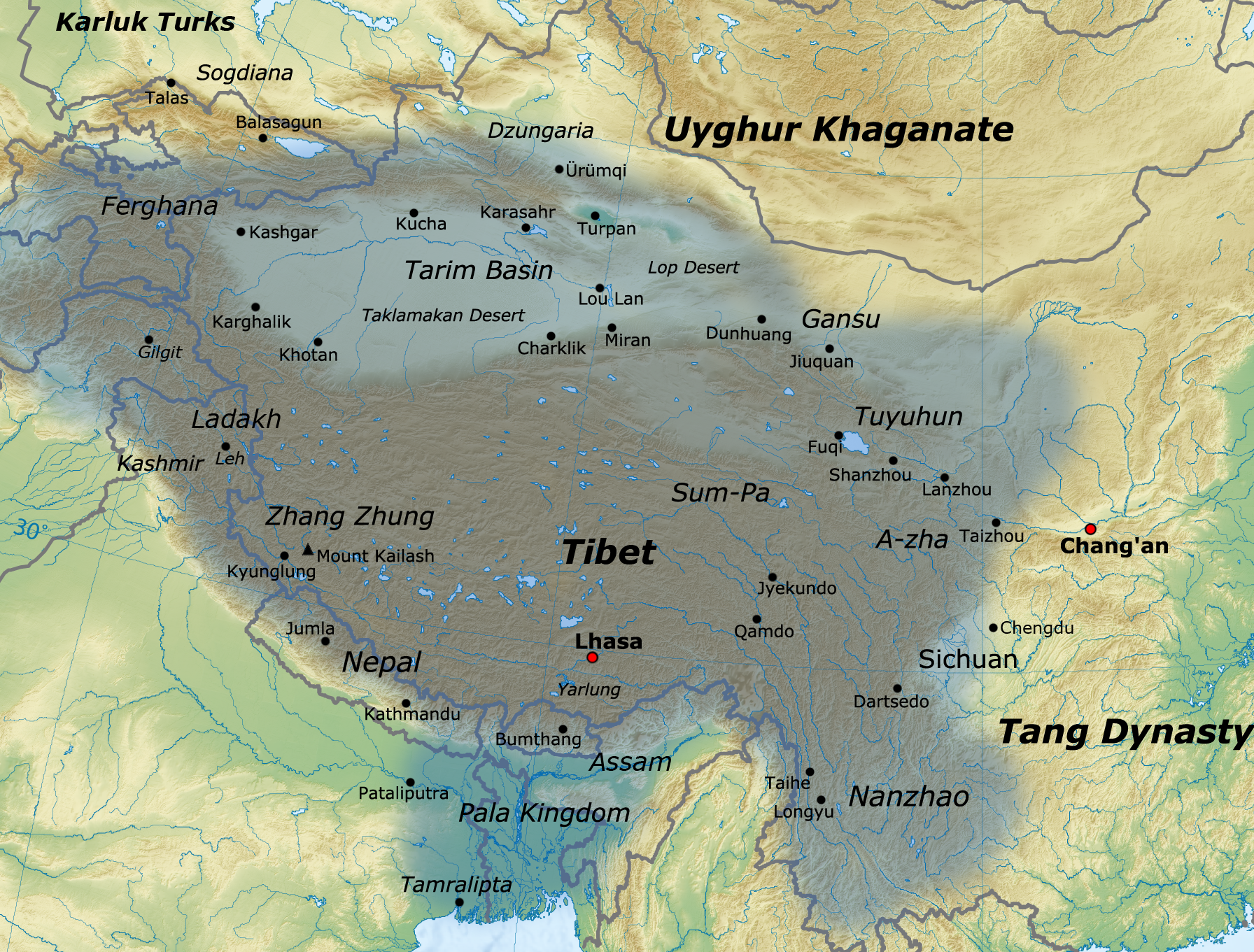
Map showing Zhangzhung and its capital Kyunglung under the Tibetan Empire

There is some confusion as to whether Central Tibet conquered Zhangzhung during the reign of Songtsen Gampo (605 or 617–649) or in the reign of Trisong Detsen (Wylie: Khri-srong-lde-btsan), (r. 755 until 797 or 804). The records of the Tang Annals do, however, seem to clearly place these events in the reign of Songtsen Gampo for they say that in 634, Yangtong (Zhangzhung) and various Qiang tribes, "altogether submitted to him". Following this he united with the country of Yangtong to defeat the 'Azha or Tuyuhun, and then conquered two more tribes of Qiang before threatening Songzhou with an army of more than 200,000 men. He then sent an envoy with gifts of gold and silk to the Chinese emperor to ask for a Chinese princess in marriage and, when refused, attacked Songzhou. He apparently finally retreated and apologised and later the emperor granted his request.

Early Tibetan accounts say that the Tibetan king and the king of Zhangzhung had married each other's sisters in a political alliance. However, the Tibetan wife of the king of the Zhangzhung complained of poor treatment by the king's principal wife. War ensued, and through the treachery of the Tibetan princess, "King Ligmikya of Zhangzhung, while on his way to Sum-ba (Amdo province) was ambushed and killed by King Songtsen Gampo's soldiers. As a consequence, Zhangzhung was annexed to Bod (Central Tibet). Thereafter the new kingdom born of the unification of Zhangzhung and Bod was known as Bod rGyal-khab." R. A. Stein places the conquest of Zhangzhung in 645.

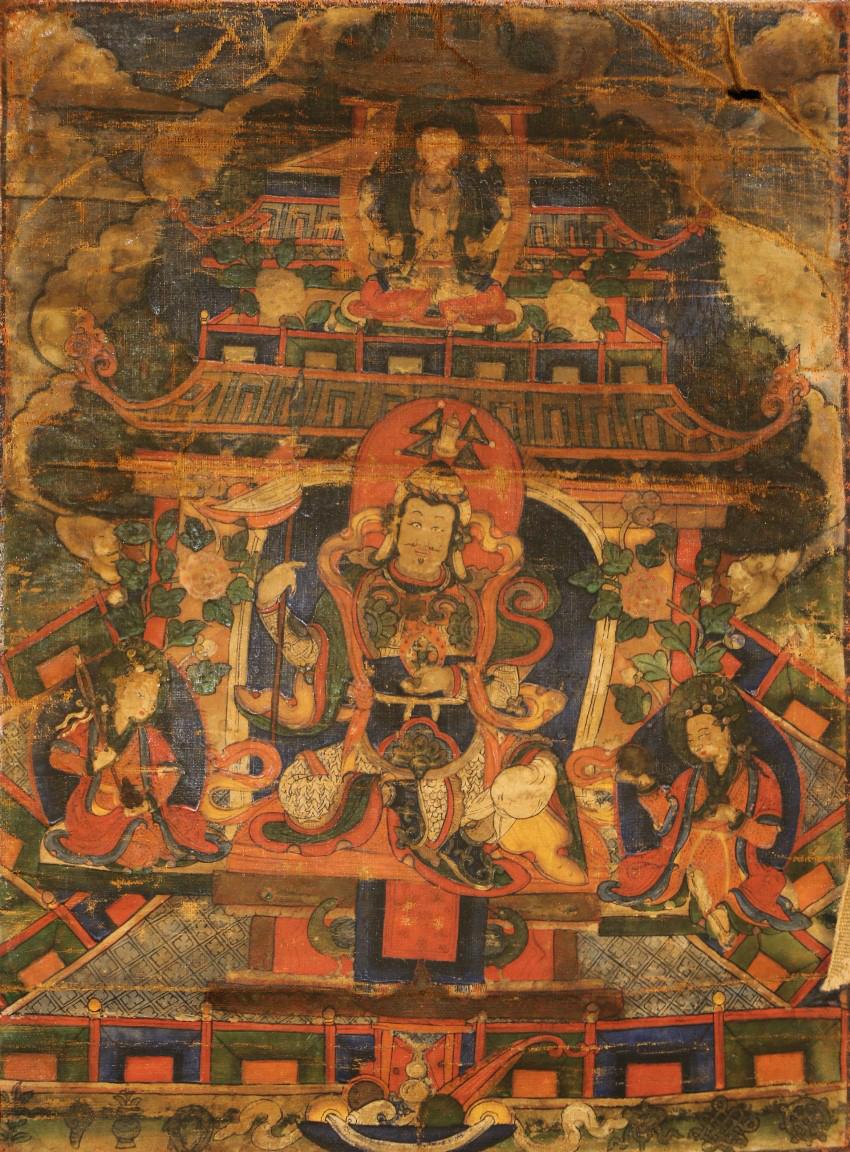
Tibetan Thangka featuring Songtsen Gampo, courtesy the Wovensouls collection, Singapore

Zhangzhung revolted soon after the death of King Mangsong Mangtsen or Trimang Löntsän (Wylie: Khri-mang-slon-rtsan, r. 650–677), the son of Songtsen Gampo, but was brought back under Tibetan control by the "firm governance of the great leaders of the Mgar clan".

== Zhangzhung language ==
Zhang-Zhung language is an extinct Sino-Tibetan language that was once spoken across the ancient kingdom of Zhangzhung in what is now western and northwestern Tibet.

A handful of Zhangzhung texts and 11th century bilingual Tibetan documents attest to a Zhang-Zhung language which was related to Kinnauri. The Bonpo claim that the Tibetan writing system is derived from the Zhangzhung alphabet, while modern scholars recognise the clear derivation of Tibetan script from a North Indian script, which accords with non-Bon Tibetan accounts. A modern Kinnauri language called by the same name (pronounced locally Jangshung) is spoken by 2,000 people in the Sutlej Valley of Himachal Pradesh who claim to be descendants of the Zhangzhung.

== Cultural legacy ==
Bonpo tradition claims that Bon was founded by a Buddha named Tonpa Shenrab Miwoche, to whom are ascribed teachings similar in scope to those ascribed to the historical Gautama Buddha. Bonpos claim that Tonpa Shenrab Miwoche lived some 18,000 years ago, and visited Tibet from the land of Tagzig Olmo Lung Ring, or Shambhala. Bonpos also suggest that during this time Lord Shenrab Miwoche's teaching permeated the entire subcontinent and was in part responsible for the development of the Vedic religion. An example of this link is said to be Mount Kailash, which is the center of Zhangzhung culture, and also the most sacred mountain to Hindus. As a result, the Bonpos claim that the supposedly much later Hindu teaching owes its origin – at least indirectly – to Tonpa Shenrab Miwoche.

== See also ==
- Zhangzhung Meri
- History of Tibet
- Ngari Prefecture
- Shambala
- Jangshung language
- Guge
- Purang-Guge Kingdom
