= West Himalayish languages =

Sino-Tibetan language group

West Himalayish
- Kanauric, Almora
- Geographic distribution: Himachal Pradesh, Uttarakhand (India), Nepal
- Linguistic classification: Sino-Tibetan: Tibeto-Burman; Tibeto-Kanauri (?); West Himalayish

Language codes
- Glottolog: tibe1275

The West Himalayish languages, also known as Almora and Kanauric, are a family of Sino-Tibetan languages centered in Himachal Pradesh, Uttarakhand and across the border into Nepal. LaPolla (2003) proposes that the West Himalayish languages may be part of a larger "Rung" group.

== Languages ==
A couple from India talk about their marriage in Marcha dialect of Rongpo, a West Himalayish language

Languages include Chitkuli Kinnauri, Kinnauri, Sunam, Jangshung, Shumcho, Pattani (Manchad), Tinan, Gahri (Bunan), Kanashi, Rongpo, Darmiya, Byangsi, Dhuleli, Chaudangsi, Rangas, and perhaps Zhangzhung.

Zhangzhung, the sacred language of the Bon religion, was spoken north of the Himalayas across western Tibet before being replaced by Tibetan. James Matisoff (2001) provides lexical and phonological evidence for the classification of Zhangzhung within West Himalayish.

== Classification ==
Widmer (2014:47) classifies the West Himalayish languages as follows. The recently discovered Dhuleli language has been added from Regmi & Prasain (2017).

- West Himalayish
  - Western
    - Lahaul: Pattani, Tinani
    - Kinnaur: Kanashi, Kinnauri, Chitkhuli, Shumcho, Jangshung
  - Eastern
    - Central: Bunan, Sunam, Rongpo; possibly Zhangzhung
    - Almora: Rangas, Darmiya, Chaudangsi, Byangsi, Dhuleli

Widmer (2014:53–56) classifies Zhangzhung within the Eastern branch of West Himalayish, and notes that it appears particularly close to languages of the Central subgroup (Bunan, Sunnami, and Rongpo).

Widmer (2017) notes that many Tibetan varieties in the western Tibetan Plateau have been influenced by West Himalayish languages.

Widmer (2025) considers the West Himalayish languages to be peripheral members of Bodish, based on shared lexical and morphoological isoglosses between Proto-West Himalayish and various Bodish groups such as Tibetan, Tamangic, East Bodish, and Tshangla.

== Vocabulary ==
Widmer (2017) lists the following lexical items that differ in the Eastern and Western branches of West Himalayish.

Language	‘one’	‘hand’	‘cry’	‘black’
Proto-Eastern; West Himalayish	*it	*gut	*krap-	*rok-
Manchad	itsa	gùṛa	krap-	roki
Kanashi	idh	guḍ	kərop-	roko
Kinnauri (Southern)	id	gŭd'	krap-	rŏkh
Proto-Western; West Himalayish	*tik	*lak	*tjo-	*kʰaj/*wom
Bunan	tiki	lak	tjo-	kʰaj
Rongpo	tig	lag	tyõ-	kʰasyũ
Byangsi	tigɛ	là	tye-	wamdɛ

Widmer (2014:53-56) classifies Zhangzhung within the eastern branch of West Himalayish, and lists the following cognates between Zhangzhung and Proto-West Himalayish.

Gloss	Zhangzhung	Proto-West Himalayish
barley	zad	*zat
blue	ting	*tiŋ-
diminutive suffix	-tse	*-tse ~ *-tsi
ear	ra tse	*re
fat	tsʰas	*tsʰos
girl	tsa med	*tsamet
god	sad	*sat
gold ?	zang	*zaŋ
heart	she	*ɕe
old (person)	shang ze	*ɕ(j)aŋ
red	mang	*maŋ
white	shi nom	*ɕi
