= List of Scheduled Tribes in Himachal Pradesh =

Tribals in Himachal Pradesh

The Scheduled Tribe accounts for 5.71% of the Himachal Pradesh with a population 392,126 out of 6,864,602 people, as per 2011 census. There are 11 communities recognized as Scheduled Tribes in the state, with latest being Hattis who were added in the state's list in 2023.

== History ==
Himachal Pradesh was created as union territory comprising four districts in the year 1948. The first Scheduled Tribe list of Himachal was passed under the Constitution (Scheduled Tribe) Order, 1950 and had eight communities (namely Bhot, Gurjar, Gaddi, Jad, Kinnaura, Lahaula, Swangla, Pangwala) and being part of Part C states, the list was re-arranged in 1951 and Bhot (or Bodh) were merged with Jad with Swangla being removed from the list due to territorial restrictions.

In 1966, after the reorganization of Punjab, many districts were added to Himachal Pradesh and in 1970, the state of Himachal Pradesh came to existence. Swanglas were re-added to the list after the recommendation of the Lokur Committee (1965), though Gurjars and Gaddis were restricted to status of Scheduled Tribes only in the 4 districts which were part of the union territory of Himachal Pradesh.

In 1975, Scheduled Areas were created in Himachal which includes district of Kinnaur and Lahaul and Spiti, and tehsils of Bharmour and Pangi Valley in Chamba district.

In the Scheduled Castes and Scheduled Tribes Orders (Amendments) 2002 removed the restrictions of districts for Gujjars and Gaddis with the communities being Scheduled Tribes across the state and added two other communities Beda and Domba (or Zoba, Garo) in the Scheduled Tribes list of the state.

In 2023, a new community residing in the Trans-Giri region (also called Giripaar) of Sirmaur district named Hatti, who are similar to the Jaunsaris of Uttarakhand were added to the Scheduled Tribes through The Constitution (Scheduled Tribes) Order (Fouth Amendment) Act, 2022. Though in the year 2023, the Himachal Pradesh High Court put a stayed on the members of the community to avail ST (Scheduled Tribe) certificates after the opposition of Gujjars and Scheduled Castes of the Trans-Giri region.

== List ==
In accordance with The Scheduled Castes and Scheduled Tribes Order (Amendment), 2002.

1. Bhot, Bodh
2. Gaddi
3. Gujjar (excluding the territories specified in sub-section (1) of section 5 of the Punjab Reorganisation Act, 1966 (31 of 1966)). The areas excluded now comprise Kangra, Hamirpur, Kullu, Una, Shimla and Lahaul and Spiti districts.
4. Jad, Lamba, Khampa
5. Kanaura, Kinnara
6. Lahaula
7. Pangwala
8. Swangla
9. Beda
10. Domba, Garo, Zoba

In accordance with The Constitution (Scheduled Tribes) Order (Third Amendment) Act, 2022.

11. Hatee (in Trans-Giri region of Sirmaur district)

== Demographics ==
=== Community wise ===
Scheduled Tribes		Population	
Code	Tribal community	Total (2011)	Percent
501	Bodh, Bhot	27,191	6.93
502	Gaddi	178,130	45.43
503	Gujjar	92,547	23.60
504	Jad, Lamba, Khamba	1,974	0.50
505	Kanaura, Kinnara	50,994	13.01
506	Lahaula	2,886	0.74
507	Pangwala	17,562	4.48
508	Swangla	9,630	2.46
509	Beta, Beda	226	0.05
510	Domba, Garo, Zoba	231	0.06
Generic tribes, etc. (those who identified them as Adivasi, Girijan or Anusuchit Janjati)		10,755	2.74
		392,126	

=== District wise ===
District		Scheduled Tribes		Largest community (Top 3)
District	Population (2011)	Population	Percent	Largest community (Top 3)
Bilaspur	381,956	10,693	2.79	Gujjar (10,278); Bodh (52); Jad (33)
Chamba	519,080	135,500	26.10	Gaddi (105,064); Pangwala (17,063); Gujjar (9,784)
Hamirpur	454,768	3,044	0.67	Gujjar (2,736); Gaddi (73); Kanaura (55)
Kangra	1,510,075	84,564	5.60	Gaddi (71,499); Gujjar (11,390); Kanaura (116)
Kinnaur	84,121	48,746	57.95	Kanaura (43,788); Bodh (332); Gaddi (33)
Kullu	437,903	16,822	3.84	Bodh (7,456); Swangla (2,626); Kanaura (1,753)
Lahaul and Spiti	31,564	25,707	81.44	Bodh (17,843); Swangla (6,856); Lahaula (363)
Mandi	999,777	12,787	1.29	Gujjar (11,278); Gaddi (615); Bodh (270)
Shimla	814,010	8,755	1.07	Kanaura (4,141); Gujjar (3,157); Bodh (312)
Sirmaur	529,855	11,262	2.12	Gujjar (10,545); Kanaura (90); Beta (50)
Solan	580,320	25,645	4.42	Gujjar (23,728); Kanaura (588); Jad (300)
Una	521,173	8,601	1.65	Gujjar (8,379); Gaddi (46); Pangwala (13)
	6,864,602	392,126	5.71	
