= Lugdi =

Indian alcoholic beverage

- Type: alcoholic drink
- Origin: India, Himachal Pradesh, Himalayan region
- Colour: White
- Ingredients: Fermentation of rice, Phab

Lugdi or Jhol (Hindi: Jhol) is an alcoholic drink produced North Indian state of Himachal Pradesh. It is traditionally prepared from cooked cereal grains, especially rice or barley. It is prepared by boiling barley grains or rice and some local herb known as Phab in water and then fermenting the material. The cereals are left in mesophilic conditions for fermentation and consumed undistilled. It is consumed in many district of Himachal Pradesh, such as kinnaur, Lahaul and Spiti, Chamba, Kullu and Kangra.

It is usually made during the summer season, as the weather and environment help the fermentation process. The drink is reserved for the winter season as it helps to keep the body warm. It is consumed on festive occasions, religious festivals and other social gatherings.Jhol یا Jhol (هندی: Jhol) یک نوشیدنی الکلی است که در ایالت هیماچال پرادش در شمال هند تولید می شود . به طور سنتی از غلات پخته شده به ویژه برنج یا جو تهیه می شود. It is consumed by many local tribes in Himachal Pradesh, such as Kinnara, Lahaula, Swangia and Pangwala.

In 1965, a report published by the Planning Commission, Government of India, noted that there was a ban on the sale of Lugdi, but it was being sold despite the ban.

== In popular culture ==
The drink was featured in the 2013's Ranbir Kapoor and Deepika Padukone starrer Hindi film Yeh Jawaani Hai Deewani.

== See also ==
- Chulli
- Feni (liquor)
- Sonti (rice drink)
- Rice wine
- List of Indian drinks
