= Rajputisation =

Process of coalescing diverse communities into the Rajput community

Rajputisation (or Rajputization) is the process by which a diverse mix of various different social groups (castes) and different varnas coalesced to form the Northern Indian Rajput community.

== Formation ==
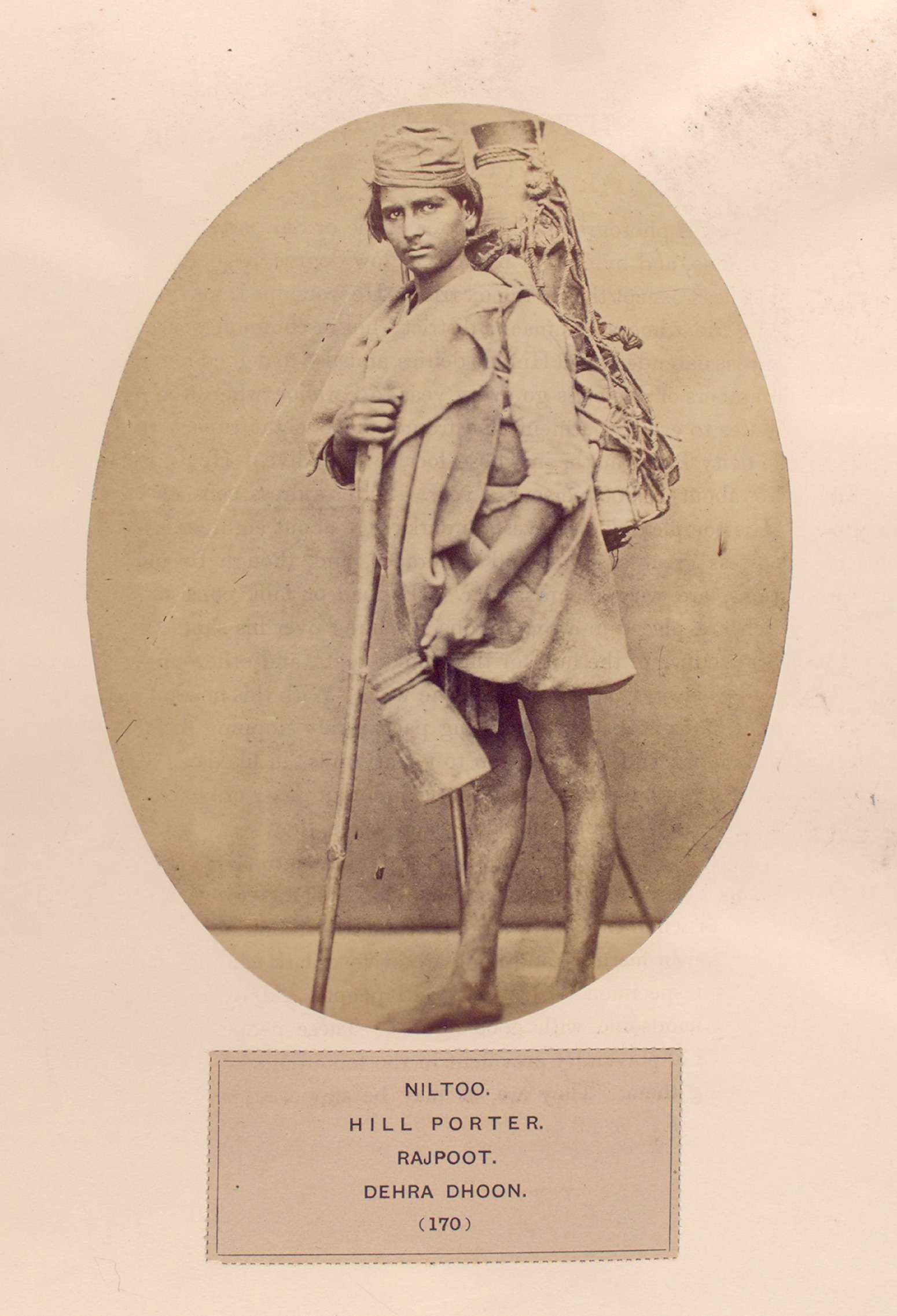
A Hill porter from Dehradun, belonging to Rajput caste.

According to modern scholars, almost all Rajputs clans originated from peasant or pastoral communities. Rajputisation is the study of formation of the community over the centuries.

Sivaji Koyal suggests that Rajputisation boosted Brahmanism and defines it as follows,

It is the means whereby a tribal chief establishes the pretensions to being a kshatriya, and surrounds himself with the paraphernalia of Brahmanism for the purpose of securing prestige.

Sociologists like Sarah Farris and Reinhard Bendix state that the original Kshatriyas in the northwest who existed until Mauryan times in tiny kingdoms were an extremely cultured, educated and intellectual group who were a challenge to monopoly of the Brahmins. According to Max Weber, ancient texts show they were not subordinate to the Brahmins in religious matters. These old Kshatriyas were undermined not only by the Brahmin priests of the time but were replaced by the rise of the new community of illiterate mercenaries in the north-west - the Rajputs. Since the Rajputs were generally illiterate unlike the Kshatriyas, their rise did not present a challenge to monopoly of the Brahmins.

Anyone from the "village landlord" to the "newly wealthy lower caste Shudra" could employ Brahmins to retrospectively fabricate a genealogy and within a couple of generations they would gain acceptance as Hindu Rajputs. This process would get mirrored by communities in north India. Scholars refer to this as "Rajputisation" and consider it similar to Sanskritisation. This process of generation of the Rajput community resulted in hypergamy as well as female infanticide that was common in Hindu Rajput clans. German historian Hermann Kulke has coined the term "Secondary Rajputisation" for describing the process of members of a tribe trying to re-associate themselves with their former tribal chiefs who had already transformed themselves into Rajputs via Rajputisation and thus claim to be Rajputs themselves.

Stewart N. Gordon states that during the era of the Mughal empire, "Hypergamous marriage" with the combination of service in the state army was another way a tribal family could convert to Rajput. This process required a change in tradition, dressing, ending widow remarriage, etc. Such marriage of a tribal family with an acknowledged but possibly poor Rajput family would ultimately enable the non-Rajput family to become Rajput. This marriage pattern also supports the fact that Rajput was an "open caste category" available to those who served in the state army and could translate this service into grants and power at the local level.

Scholars also give some examples of entire communities of Shudra origin "becoming" Rajput even as late as the 20th century. William Rowe, in his "The new Chauhans : A caste mobility movement in North India", discusses an example of a large section of a Shudra caste – the Noniyas – from Madhya Pradesh, Uttar Pradesh and Bihar that had "become" Chauhan Rajputs over three generations in the Raj era. The more wealthy or advanced Noniyas started by forming the Sri Rajput Pacharni Sabha (Rajput Advancement Society) in 1898 and emulating the Rajput lifestyle. They also started the wearing of sacred thread. Rowe states that at a historic meeting of the caste in 1936, every child this Noniya section knew about their Rajput heritage.

A caste of shepherds who were formerly Shudras successfully changed their status to Rajput in the Raj era and started wearing the sacred thread. They are now known as Sagar Rajputs. (not to be confused with Sagar Rajputs of Bundelkhand which was a subclan of Bundela Rajputs and are considered to be the highest among all central India Rajputs).

The terminology "Rajput" as of now doesn't represent a hereditary status but it is a term commonly applied to all those people who fought on the horseback and were associated with paid military service. The Rajputs claim to be Kshatriyas or descendants of Kshatriyas, but their actual status varies greatly, ranging from princely lineages to common cultivators The Rajputs of Rajasthan are known to hold distinctive identity as opposed to other regions. This identity is usually described as "proud Rajput of Rājputāna". The Rajputs of Rajasthan have often refused to acknowledge the warriors from regions outside of the Rajputana region as Rajputs. These western Rajputs restricted their social contact with the people of variety of ethnic and cultural backgrounds, who claimed Rajput status by following intermarriages between themselves and preserving their "purity of blood". Hence many Rajputs of Rajasthan are nostalgic about their past and keenly conscious of their genealogy, emphasising a Rajput ethos that is martial in spirit, with a fierce pride in lineage and tradition. However, by the 17th century, the Ujjainiya Rajput clan of Bihar was recognised as Parmar Rajputs by the Rajputs of Rajasthan and were allowed a place in the Rajasthani bardic khyat.

Dirk H. A. Kolff describes soldiers of Silhadi and Medini Rai with the terminology "Rajput" or "Pseudo Rajput" migrated from Bihar, Awadh and Varanasi. These Rajputs or the eastern Rajputs often accompanied the Rajputs of Rajasthan in their battles with the hordes of their supporters. They led the band of warriors called Purbiyas in order to assist their western counterparts.

=== Steps in Rajputisation process ===
In general, the process of Rajputisation was done not just by a tribal chief but by "castes all over north India ranging from peasants and lower-caste Sudras", as well as warriors and even the "local raja who had recently converted to Islam".

Sivaji Koyal has explained the Rajputisation of a tribal chief by dividing it in 7 successional steps.

Rajputisation used to begin with an invitation by a "budding tribal Raja" to the Brahmins in order to seek their assistance in the establishment of a court for him, for which the Brahmins would receive "land and gifts". Later, the Brahmins would "somehow" discover that the tribal head is a Rajput and "his lineage was traced back to some important kshatriya dynasty of the past". After his proclamation as a Rajput, he would distance himself from the members of his tribe as they were supposedly of different bloodlines. Following that, he would raise his stature by hiring Brahmins as priests who used to appeal for the construction of temples in the honor of their gods.

In the next step, after amassing political and economic power, the Raja would establish "marriage alliances" with other Rajputs to infuse "Rajput blood into his family". This was followed by the springing up of sub–chiefs who used to follow suit of the "behavioral pattern of their king–master". The final step involved the inter–marriage between the nobles and the "lesser sons and daughters" of the Raja.

Sivaji Koyal is of the opinion that by the process of Rajputisation, the Huns were the first to receive proclamation as kshatriyas in India who were later on followed by Rajputana's Scythians, Gurjaras, and Maitrakas. Rajputisation of ruling group of a tribe who had formerly disassociated with the tribe and become Rajput was followed by a process called "Secondary Rajputisation" where the former members of the tribe would try to re-associate with their former chief and this claim to be Rajputs themselves. Rajputisation is said to have no parallel in traditional Indian society for "inventiveness in ideologies of legitimation".

=== Differences between Sanskritisation and Rajputisation ===
Differences between Sanskritisation and Rajputisation
Criteria	Sanskritisation	Rajputisation
End result on success	Become Upper caste (twice-born)	Become Rajput
Religious code	Belief in Karma, Dharma, rebirth, moksha	Worship of Shiva and Shakti; Priestly supervision of rites of passage
Diet	Prohibition of beef and Teetotalism	Meat eating Imbibing alcohol and opium
Dressing code	-	Wearing of sword for men Wearing of purdah (or veil) for women
Social interaction	Claiming cultural vocation Patronisation from dominant political power Prohibition of widow remarriage	Right to all political occupations Aggrandize lands Adoption of code of violence Compilation of clan genealogies

=== Attempted Rajputisation of Adivasi people ===
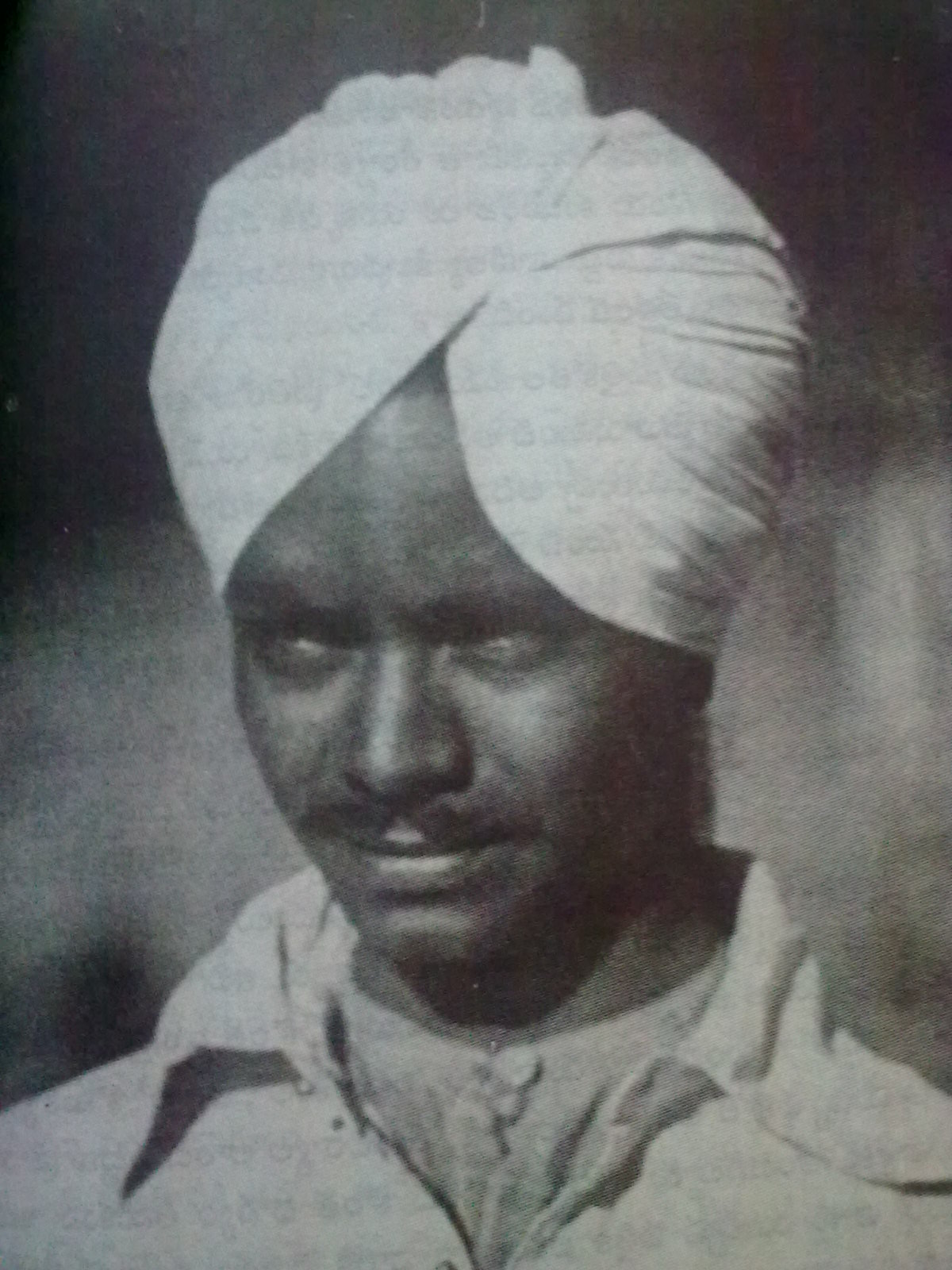
A man from the Gond community.

Bhangya Bhukya notes that during the final years of the British Raj, while education introduced Westernisation in the hilly areas of central India, the regions also parallelly underwent the Hinduisation and Rajputisation processes. The Gond people and their chiefs started doing the "caste–Hindu practices" and frequently claimed the "Rajput, and thus kshatriya status". The British empire used to support these claims as they viewed the adivasi society to be less civilized than the caste society and believed that adivasi peoples' association with the castes would make the adivasis "more civilized and sober" and "easier for the colonial state to control". Bhukya also points out that central India's "Raj Gond families" had already adopted the religious and social traditions of the Rajputs before the British Raj in India, and there were "matrimonial relations" between a number of Gond and Rajput Rajas. However, the British empire's policies of offering "zamindari rights, village headships and patelships" fueled the process.

According to Patit Paban Mishra, "the 'kshatriyaisation' of tribal rulers and their surroundings, resulted in the Hinduisation of tribal areas".

=== Rajputisation among the Khasa (Khasi) ===
The Khasa or Khasi were the indigenous landholding and peasant groups of Kumaon and Garhwal. Rajputisation among them was a process of upward mobility through which they adopted Rajput customs, symbols, and identity to raise their ritual and social status.

Scholars note that scarcity of women among immigrant Thuljat Rajputs and Brahmins led to intermarriages with Khasi women, producing descendants who later claimed Rajput status. Over time, Khasa groups adopted Rajput practices such as wearing the sacred thread, worship of clan goddesses, and use of Rajput gotras. Landholding Khasi Jimdars were also incorporated into Rajput society.

By the medieval period many had become known as Khasi Rajputs, distinct from the immigrant Thuljat Rajputs (such as Chand, Chauhan, Negi, Rawat, Rautela, Bisht). Historians regard this as one of the clearest cases of caste mobility in the central Himalayas.

=== Rajputisation among the Himachal Tribes ===
The present day Himachal Pradesh was under ruled by various Rajput kingdoms, the most prominent of which includes the Bushahr and Chamba State in committing the Rajputisation of the tribal communities of Gaddis, Kanaura and Lahaula as part of Hinduisation of the region and integrating them into broader Kshatriya category. Kanets of the Kinnaur undergo the process of Rajputisation and in return were awarded with agricultural lands, along with titles such as Negi, Rana, Rawat and Thakur. In the case of Lahaulas, who are small isolated community present in Lahaul and Spiti had undergone a complete Rajputisation with use of Gotras of Rajputs of neighbouring region. The process of Rajputisation among the Lahaulas was parallel to their Hinduisation, yet there were mainly Buddhist Lahaulas who identified their caste as Boudh Rajput.

=== Attempted Rajputisation of Darogas ===
The Darogas formed a community and started calling themselves Ravana Rajputs in order to Rajputize. They are a group who are believed to be the progeny of Rajput kings with their concubines and were most often called as Daroga. Lindsey Harlan gives an example of how children born from Rajput men and Gujjar women would not become Rajputs and would become Darogas.

=== Attempted Rajputisation of Jats ===
The Sikh adoption of the Rajput surnames Singh and Kanwar/Kaur was seen by some historians as an attempt by the Sikhs to Rajputise their identity. This form of Rajputisation was more specifically done for the Jat Sikhs who were considered to be of low origin amongst the Sikhs. The Phulkian Jats, who originally gained power by helping the Mughal Emperor Babur enter India, continued to Rajputise their identity till the 20th century by remotely claiming descent from the Bhati Rajputs of Jaisalmer. Similarly the Jats of Bharatpur and Dholpur also tried to Rajputise their origin. Bharatpur reportedly lost its Rajput status when their ancestor Balchand was unable to have children with his Rajput wife and had sons with a Jat woman. The British-era ethnographer Denzil Ibbetson wrote that the terms like “Rajput” or "Jat" in the Punjab region of what is now Pakistan, was used as a title rather than as a “ethnological fact". The tribes after rising to royal rank could become Rajput.

=== Attempted Rajputisation of Yadavs ===
Many groups adopted the Yadav surname for upliftment, these groups were mainly cowherders and were low in the caste order but were considered higher than the untouchables. In 1931 several communities like Ahir, Goala, Gopa, etc. started calling themselves Yadavs and made extremely doubtful claims about having Rajput origin and thus tried to Rajputise. There were a number of times when the Ahirs from the Ahirwal region had cultural traditions similar to the Rajputs such as the martial tradition, and were mixed with being of the Rajput identity. The Mughals acknowledged and distincted the Ahir clans which claimed to be Rajput by blood. The Yaduvanshi term was to describe the Kshatriyas who claimed descent from Krishna, and received a Rajput identity as Krishna was seen as the "cowherder-Rajput god". By the 19th century, the Rewari Ahir clans began to make marital relations with Rajput dynasties such as Bikaner, and the marriages legitimized their being of "aristocratic" and "Rajput".

=== Attempted Rajputisation of Kolis ===
Records of Koli people exist from at least the 15th century, when rulers in the present-day Gujarat region called their chieftains marauding robbers, dacoits, and pirates. Over a period of several centuries, some of them were able to establish petty chiefdoms throughout the region, mostly comprising just a single village. Although not Rajputs, this relatively small elite subset of the Kolis claimed the status of the higher-ranked Rajput community, adopting their clan names, lineages, customs and intermixing with less significant Rajput families through the practice of hypergamous marriage, which was commonly used to enhance or secure social status. There were significant differences in status throughout the Koli community, however, and little cohesion either geographically or in terms of communal norms, such as the establishment of endogamous marriage groups. The Kolis also employed Barots to fabricate a genealogy which would state the Kolis were of partial Rajput origin.

=== Rajputisation of Jadejas ===
According to the sociologist Lyla Mehta, the Jadeja were Hindu descendants of a Muslim tribe that had migrated from Sindh to Kutch. They originated from pastoral communities and laid a claim on the Rajput identity after marriages with Sodha Rajput women. Gujarat's Jadeja Rajputs were called "half-Muslim" and they employed Muslim African Siddi slaves for cooking.

== See also ==
- Acculturation
- Bhats
