= Gurjars in Himachal Pradesh =

Ethnic group in Himachal Pradesh

Himachali Gujjars
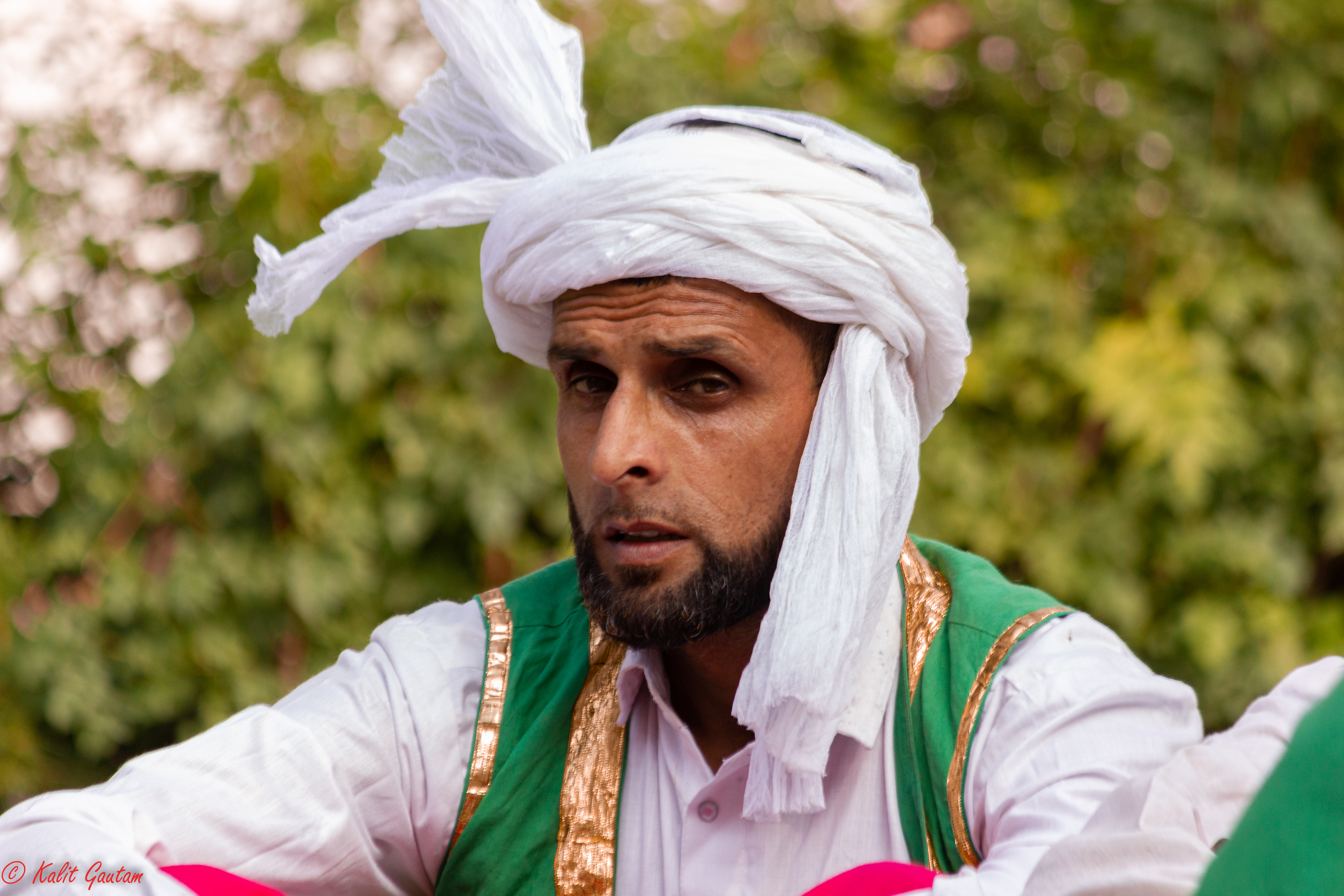
- Tribal Gujjar man from Chamba district

Total population
- 92,547 (2011 census)

Regions with significant populations
- (India) Himachal Pradesh

Languages
- L1: Gujari, Pahadi, Kangri (native language); L2: Urdu, Hindi (additional languages)

Religion
- •majority: Islam (Note: The majority of Himachali Gurjars about 86% are Muslim and the other are 14% Hindus.) •minority: Hinduism

Related ethnic groups
- Gurjars, Gaddis, Pangwala, Bharai

Gurjars in Himachal Pradesh or Himachali Gujjars, (Note: They are also known as Gujars in Himachal, Gurjaras in Himachal Pradesh, Himachali Gujars or Gojars.) are an ethnic community native to the Indian state of Himachal Pradesh. They are descended from Gurjars who moved into this region during medieval times. They are scattered across almost all districts of Himachal Pradesh; They are densely populated in Solan, Mandi, Sirmaur, Chamba, and Kangra districts, while Lahaul and Spiti district has the smallest Gujjar population. Approximately 86% of the total Gurjar population in Himachal Pradesh are Muslim and remaining 14% are Hindu.

In Himachal Pradesh, Hindu Gujjars have traditionally been settled with some nomads, while Muslim Gujjars are primarily nomads with some settled communities. (Note: Himachali Gurjars fall into two groups. The settled, mostly Hindu group is called Sivander or Savanadaras. The nomadic, mostly Muslim group. Muslim Gurjars further divided into Van Gurjars, Dodhi Gurjars and Bakarwals.) Amongst the nomadic Muslim communities, there are three distinct groups of Muslim Gujjars known as Van Gujjars, Dodhi Gujjars, and Bakarwals.

As per 2011 census, Gurjars constitute 23.06% of the Scheduled Tribe population and approximately 1.35% of the total population of Himachal Pradesh. (Note: Gurjars are Himachal Pradesh's second-largest Scheduled Tribe, at 1.35% of the population (2011 census).) They are the second-largest Schedule Tribe in the state, after the Gaddis.

== History ==
According to legends, the Himachali Gurjars came to Himachal Pradesh about 300 years ago from the Jammu region of Jammu and Kashmir.

Muslim Gujjars initially migrated to the former princely states of Chamba and Sirmur due to limited grazing land in Jammu and Kashmir, later spreading to other areas of the Himachal Pradesh.

Gujjars migrated to Himachal Pradesh a few decades before 1881. Census data states that by 1881, there was an estimated 906 Gurjar people living in that area. The 1904 Chamba Gazetteer supports this, stating Gurjars settled there about 40 to 50 years earlier and primarily perused their flocks through the Ravi Valley, Chamba district and the surrounding hills.

The Gazetteer of Kangra state in 1883-84 indicates the presence of Gujjars within the district. Some Gujjar households emigrated from Jammu to the Chamba area and also migrated into the highlands of Rihlu, where they remained all summer grazing their livestock. After September they would depart for Nurpur, where they would remain until the hard winter and return to their customary routes south and west to Kullu or Mandi. Acting in a transitory fashion, many Gujjars would never settle down permanently anywhere else in the Kangra district, but rather use Kangra as a place for rest and sustenance while travelling to Kullu and Mandi.

Before British rule, the grazing rights of Gaddi and tribal Gujjars over forest and uncultivated land were not clearly defined. The British introduced new forest policies that regulated grazing. During this time, the rights of hill communities were recorded and settled in official records. Land and forest ownership were not decided at first. Information about earlier systems and people's rights was collected in Settlement Records. In 1864, the forest of Kangra came under the Deputy Commissioner. In 1849, George Carnac Barnes was appointed Settlement Officer. He settled the forest and non-forest areas of Kangra region while reserving rights for Gaddis, nomad Gujjars, and village communities. He allowed them broad access to the forests, as the uncultivated land was considered plentiful at the time.

During the 19th century, Gujjars migrated to Himachal Pradesh, specifically the Dhauladhar range, and began living in forested areas called "dhars". Each spring, these Gujjars would migrate up to their dhar areas (in April) for grazing (summer grazing months) on the millions of acres of high mountain meadows and forests located there and, in the fall (by October), would migrate back down to the plains in Chamba. Gujjars also had many different migration routes; many Gujjars migrated to Kangra from Jammu while many others migrated to Chamba via Chamba.

In Una, Gujjars arrived from other parts of Punjab around the middle to late 19th century and were mostly new settlers to the area from other portions of Punjab. Gujjars migrated to Bilaspur from Delhi or Rajasthan and most of the Gujjars who later settled in Solan district arrived from the Sirmur. Due to the marriage alliance between the Kingdom of Poonch and Sirmaur State, 19 Gujjar families initially migrated into Sirmaur; however, more Gujjar groups continued to migrate into the area via various routes and on their own. According to local lore, it is believed that the migration of Gujjar families to Himachal Pradesh began with the Maharaja of Sirmaur discovering the buffalo milk of the Gujjars of the Poonch Kingdom in Kashmir during one of his trips. The Maharaja liked it so much that he brought back a few families of Gujjars to Sirmur, and over the next few years, these Gujjar families migrated to many other parts of Himachal Pradesh, most likely beginning in the first two decades of the 20th century.

The 1906 Settlement Report for G.S. Hart said that some families of Gujjars moved from Jammu to Kiarda dun during the rule of Maharaja Shamsher Prakash (1870s) while under the Sirmur State. They then spread into adjoining forests in the Shimla Hill States, including Bushahr, Khaneti, and Keonthal.

With restrictions through quotas by the Himachal Pradesh Forest Department on available buffalo grazing, approximately 20% of the Gujjar families left the Saal valley forever from 1990 to 2001 to go to Punjab in search of better grazing opportunities. This ultimately resulted in a loss of ST status and associated benefits, although the benefits were generally not taken advantage of.

== Demographics ==
The Gujjar community primarily reside in various valleys of Himachal Pradesh, including Chamba, Kangra, Kullu, Parvati, Solang, and Kinaur. They are found almost across all districts of Himachal Pradesh.

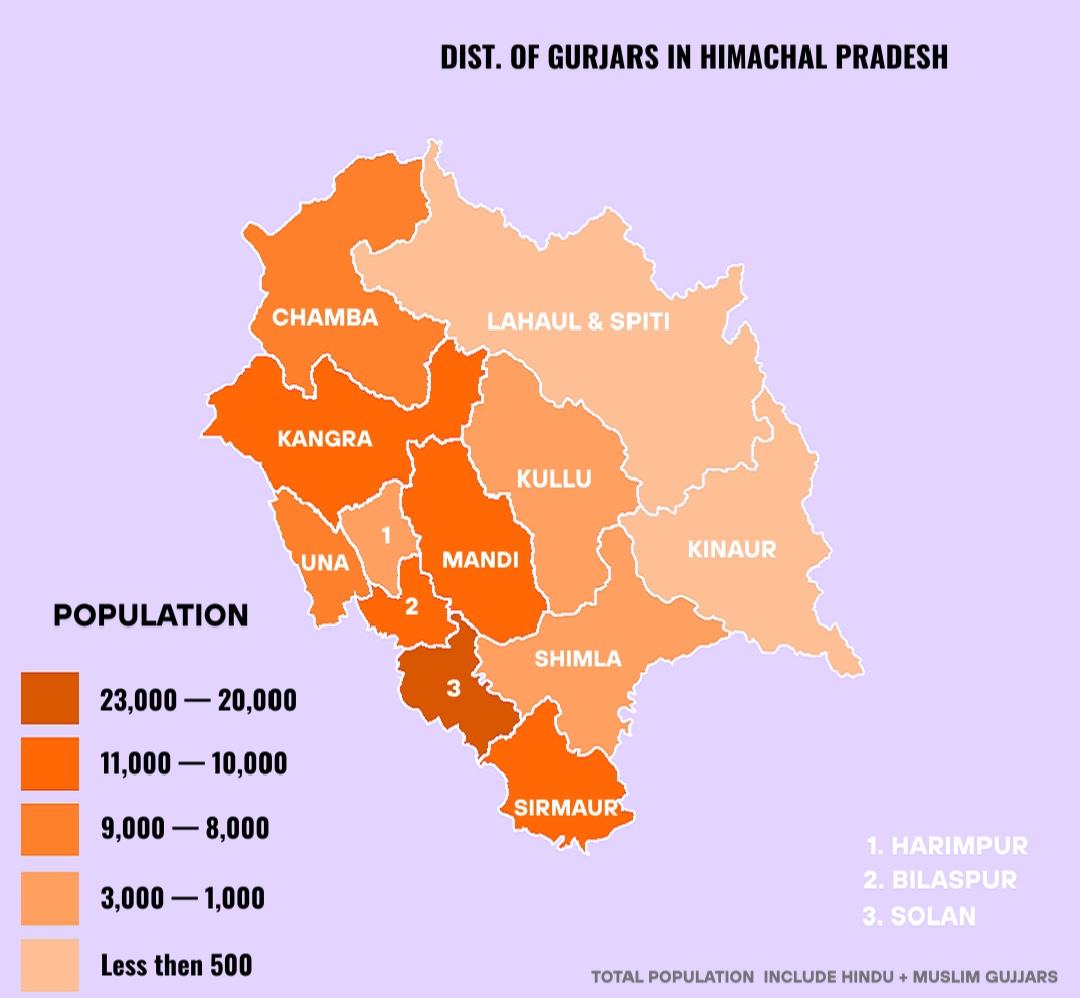

In Chamba and Kangra districts, the Gujjar community is referred to as 'Van Gujjars', predominantly consisting of Muslims, making up 97.12% of the Gujjar population of 9,784. In contrast, Gujjars in Una and Bilaspur are known as 'Heer Gujjars', primarily comprising Hindus who have settled in the area.

Muslim Gujjars are predominantly found in the Chamba, Mandi, Solan, Una, and Sirmaur districts. Some of them particularly from the nomad class, also inhabit forest and mountainous areas.

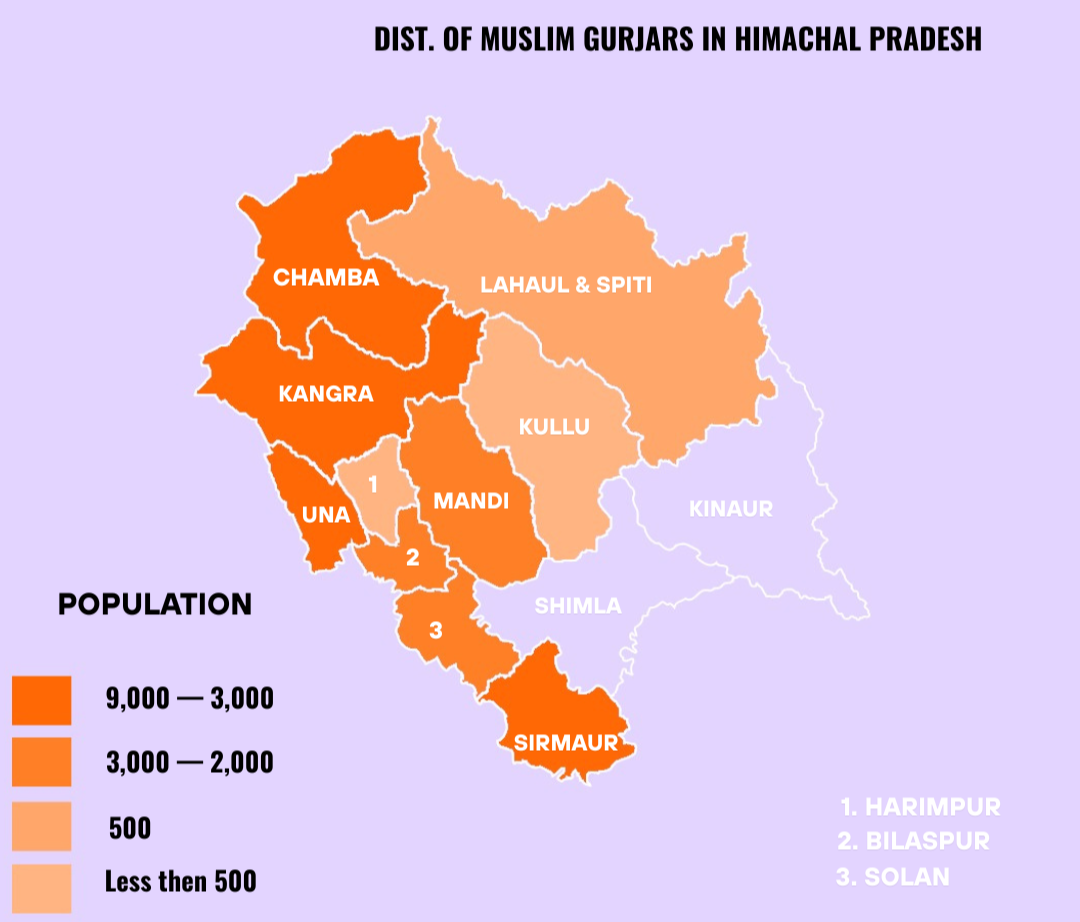

The Hindu Gujjars are mostly settled in Una, Mandi, Bilaspur, Kangra, Chamba, Solan, Sirmaur districts of the state.

== Divisions ==
In Himachal Pradesh, Gujjars are organised into various subgroups and clans that are shared among both Hindu Gujjars and Muslim Gujjars. Gurjars from different clans each claim a different origin.

=== Subgroups ===
Himachal Gurjars are divided into different subgroups or divisions based on their occupation, customs or lifestyle.

==== Bhatariye and Bhanariye ====
Based on their marriage customs, Himachali Muslim Gujjars are divided further into two main sections. Bhatariye and Bhanariye, which typically do not intermarry. These two sections are further subdivided into exogamous clans.

==== Sivander Gurjars ====
A small group of Gurjars called Sivander Gurjars or Savanadaras. They belonged to settled class of Gurjars and are farmers. The main settlements of the Sivander Gujjars are found in the Bilaspur, Chamba, Mandi, and Sirmaur districts.

==== Heer Gurjars ====
Heer Gurjars are a group of Hindu Gurjars who live a settled life. They are mostly found in Una and Bilaspur districts in southern part of Himachal Pradesh.

==== Ban Gurjars ====
Van Gurjars, or Ban Gurjars, are a subgroup of Muslim Gurjars. They are traditionally nomadic pastoralists who do not own land in Himachal Pradesh, and are believed to have migrated there from Jammu and Kashmir (Union territory).

=== Clans ===
Some known clans found among Himachali Gurjars are as follows:

- Kataria
- Tas
- Kor
- Khepar
- Toor
- Didhar (Dedar)
- Bhumphal
- Gorsi (Gursi)
- Padhana
- Katariya (Katarya)
- Bhadana
- Chauhan
- Koli
- Bajar (Bajaar)
- Chhore
- Ladi
- Lohana
- Lodha
- Khatana
- Chechi
- Theckari
- Dindha (Dinda)
- Bania (Vania)
- Maisi (Mehsi)
- Pathan
- Motla (Motle)
- Kantiya
- Bhunch
- Bargat
- Kalas (Kaalas)
- Dhakkar (Dhakad)
- Poswal (Poshwal, Parswal)
- Chandle (Chandel, Chandila)
- Fasane
- Malheria
- Kantiya

== Culture ==
Hindu and Muslim Gujjars in Himachal Pradesh share many common social and religious practices with the wider population.

=== Languages ===
In Himachal Pradesh, they speak various regional languages, including Pahari, Kangri, Hindi, Urdu and Gujari. The Kangri language is mostly spoken by Hindu Gujjars in Kangra region. Muslim Gujjars in the state mostly speak Gujari as their mother tongue. In the 2011 census, there were 14,127, Gujari speakers among the Muslim Gujjars in Himachal Pradesh.

=== Attire ===
Himachali Gujjars have distinctive traditional attire and grooming. Men typically sport beards and wear traditional clothing like loose-fitting trousers, long shirts, and Himachali caps. Women wear fitted trousers, loose tops, and a long scarf to cover their heads, with some Muslim Gujar women observing purdah. Both Gujjar men and women adorn themselves with ornaments, with the women having a particular fondness for gold and silver jewellery.

The Gurjars kept to themselves and stayed separate from the other communities of Himachal Pradesh. They are tall and slim. The Gurjar men wear turbans and women wear kurtas with traditional embroidery. Because of their looks, they are easy to recognise. While, Gurjar children wear a hat called "Gujari Topi". It is similar to a kantop and has pointed top in different colours.

=== Food ===
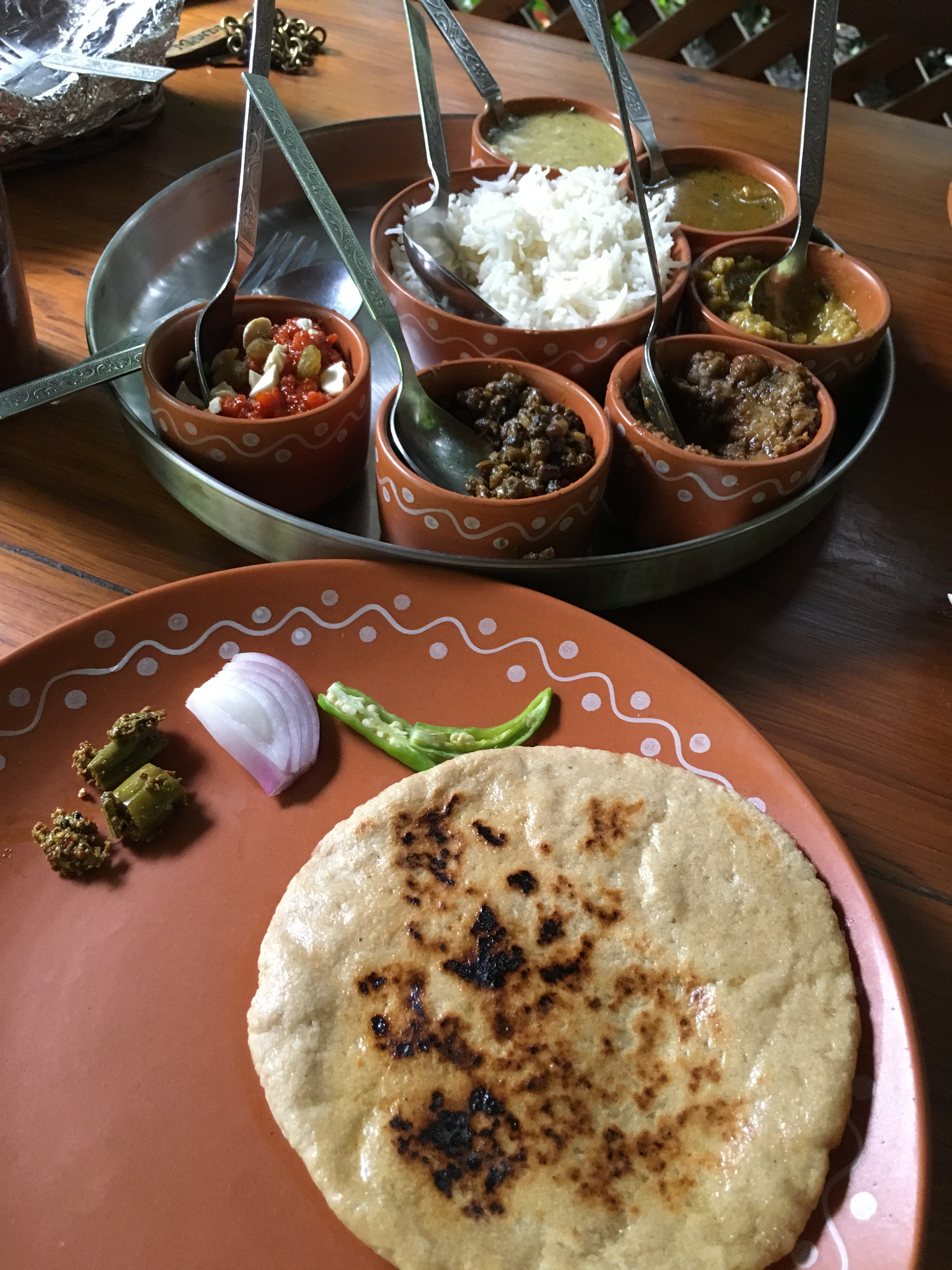
Typical Himachali cuisine.

In Himachal Pradesh, Gurjars typically eat simple, wholesome foods like maize, dairy products such as butter, yogurt, milk and ghee. Meat is an occasional part of their diet, especially among Muslim Gujjars.

==== Beverage ====
Most Gurjars do not drink alcohol or use any kind of simulant. Even when they travel across snow- covered mountain paths or through deep forestd, they do not feel the need for any drink. Even in extreme cold weather, Gurjars women also do not smoke beedi (cigarettes) and they do not drink alcohol.

=== Wedding ===
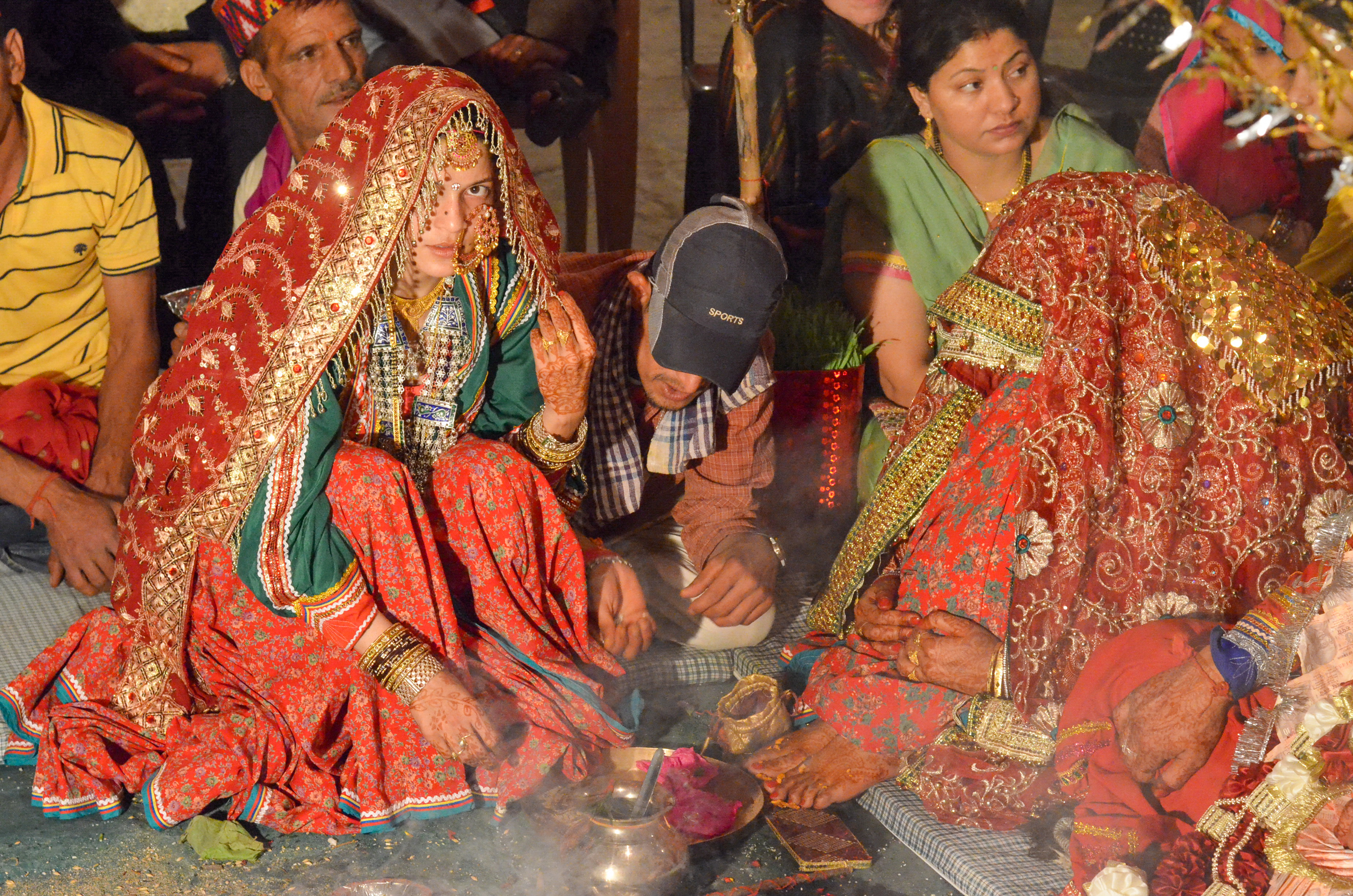
Traditional Himachali wedding.

Gurjars wedding ceremonies are very simple. Muslim Gujjars welcome the birth of a child as a divine blessing and a joyous occasion. Muslim Gujars recognise various forms of marriage, including Batta-Satta, service based unions, bride price marriages, and Ghar-Jawain.

Unlike some other Hindu cultures, they do not practice polyandry. Marriage within the clan was previously prohibited among Himachali Gurjars. Among Muslim Gurjars, this prohibition no longer strictly exists.

==== Monogamy ====
Most Gurjars are monogamous. They follow one marriage at a time and trace family lineage through the father. They value pure blood ties on the father's side. However, they do not have local clans. They also do don't follow strict rules about marrying inside or outside their own village.

==== Divorce ====
Gurjars in Himachal Pradesh get divorced quite often. If either the husband or wife wants to separate, the matter is taken to the committee of local Gujjar Panchayat.

=== Family structure ===
Gurjar families in Himachal Pradesh often live together in joint families. In these families, the oldest man is in charge and is called "Sayana". They share food and resources, including animals. However, many Gurjar families are now choosing to live in smaller, nuclear families, showing that their society is slowly changing.

==== Birth ====
Birth of a child is considered as a God gift in most Gurjar families. A son is welcomed with great happiness. To avoid the evil eye, the news of a son's birth is shared with neighbours only later. A husband is not allowed to enter the room where his wife gives birth.

Gurjar boys are circumcised at age 5 as part of their Islamic tradition. A barber ford the operation. Animals are sacrificed during the ceremony. Followed by a feast for family and friends.

==== Family planning ====
Tribal Gurjars do not believe in birth control. They view it as wrong in society and against God. Family planning and abortion are not practised among tribal Gurjars.

=== Festivals ===
Muslim Gurjars of Chamba valley in Himachal Pradesh celebrate all Muslim festivals including, Eid, Shab-e-Barat, and Eid-e-Milad. They keep fast during the month of Ramazan, and they also observe Muharam. Even today, a Gaud Brahmin visits some of the Muslim Gurjar families after the birth of a child in order to bless their child.

=== Beliefs ===
Gurjars usually pray in the morning at sunrise. They follow the traditional Muslim way of praying. First they wash themselves, and then they sit in a mat or musalla. They wear a prayer cap called a Topi, or they cover their head with a rumal.

The Gurjars of Himachal Pradesh also believe in good and bad spirits. According to one legend, Nyaz Ali Gujjar, a respected man from their community, had an encounter with a spirit.

=== Kucha ===
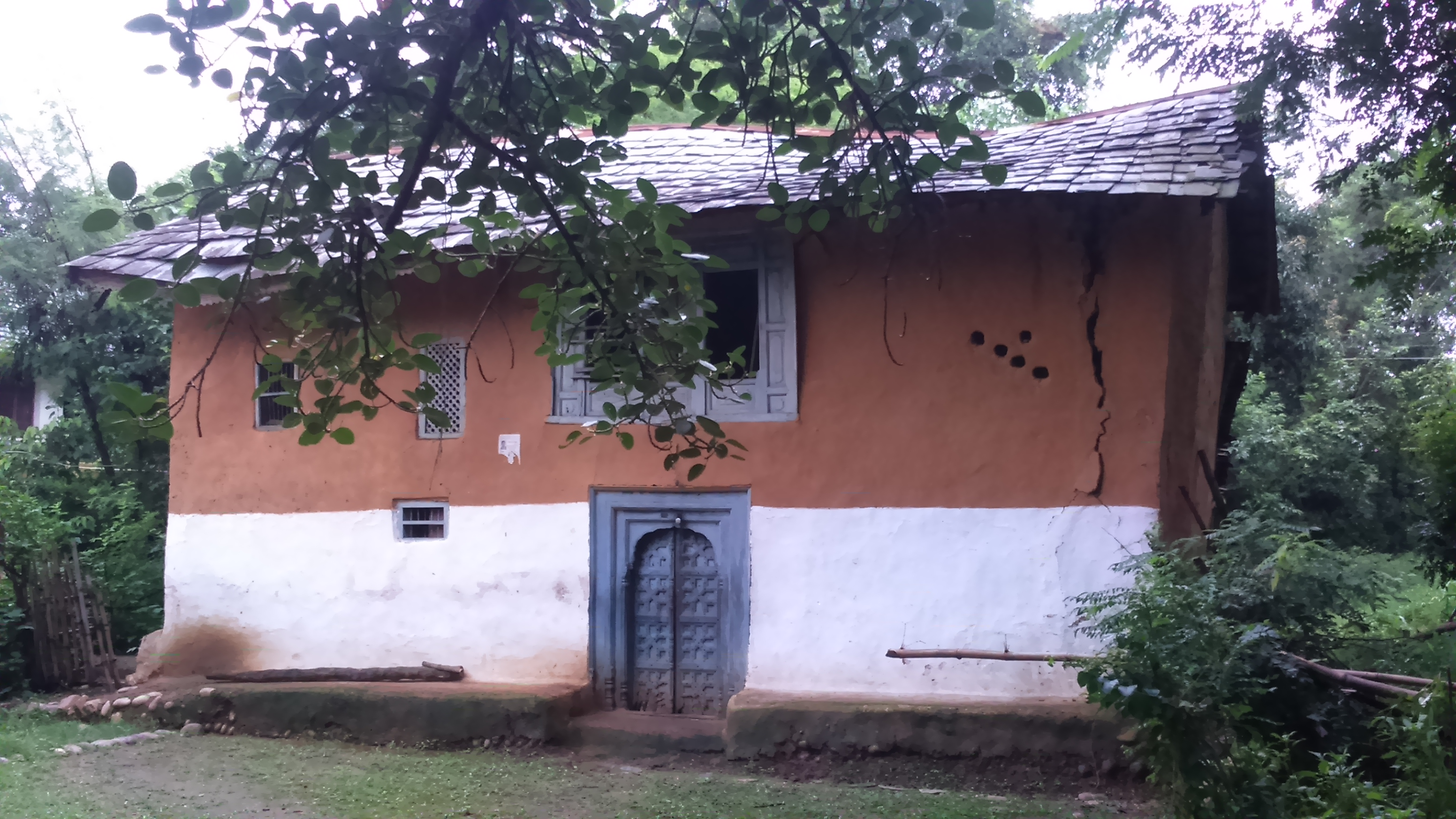
Traditional Himachali Kachha house made of cowdung (or mud).

The Kucha houses are made up of mud, grass, cowdung, and straw. In Himachal Pradesh tribal Gujjars mostly live in Kucha houses. Almost 48% Gujjar families live in Kucha house, 32% in partially built houses, and 20% in strong, finished houses. In Himachal Pradesh many Gujjars face housing challenges, likely due to financial struggles and limited access to government support.

==== Livestock ====
Tribal Gurjars along with buffaloes, cattles, sheep, and goats, Gujjars also keep horses and ponies. They use these horses and ponies to carry their household belongings when they migrate on mountains. hey in the mountain areas of Himachal Pradesh keep fierce and dogs. The dogs protest their cattle and mules. The mules carry their tents and luggage.

=== Dance ===
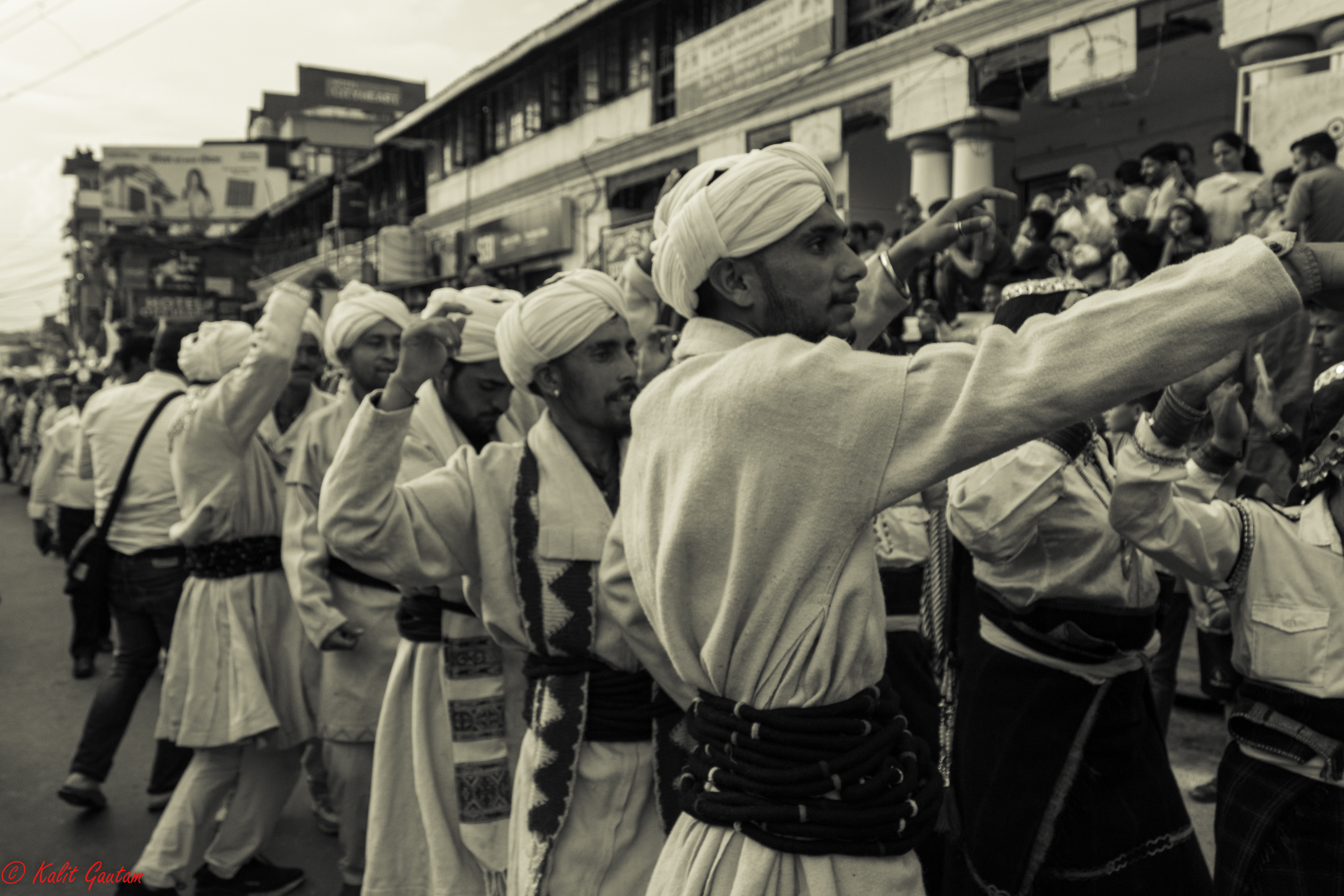
A group of Gaddi men performing traditional dance in Chamba, Himachal Pradesh.

The Gurjars of the Chamba valley are mostly Muslim now perform only the sword and staff dance. This dance is performed only by Gurjar men. Gurjar women do not take part in public dancing.

The Talwar Khelna is a kind of dance performed by the Gurjars of Chamba. This dance is performed during marriage processions. The long sticks carried by members of the marriage party remind us of an earlier time in the parties often faced robbers on the way, so they had to be ready to defend themselves.

=== Folk songs ===
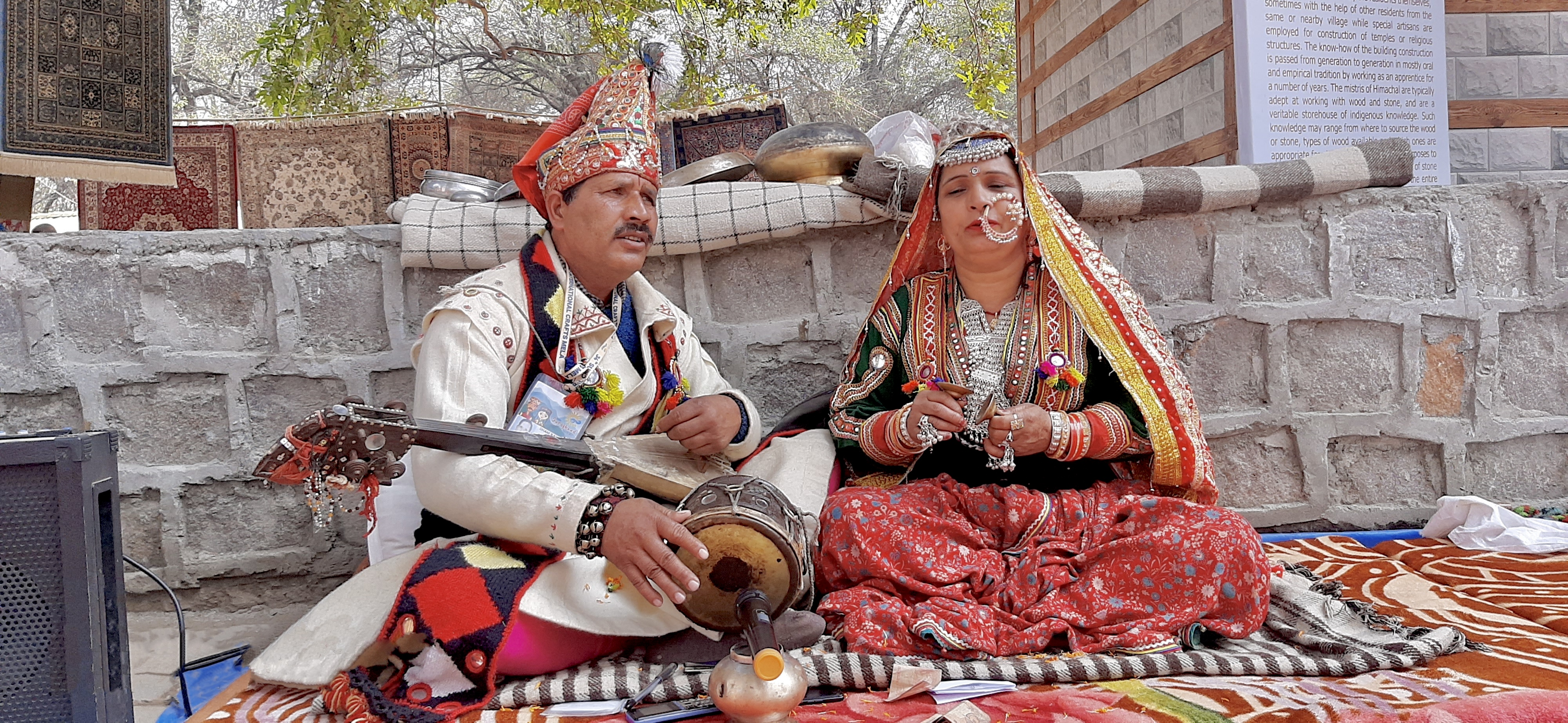
Male and female folk singers from Kangra, Himachal Pradesh.

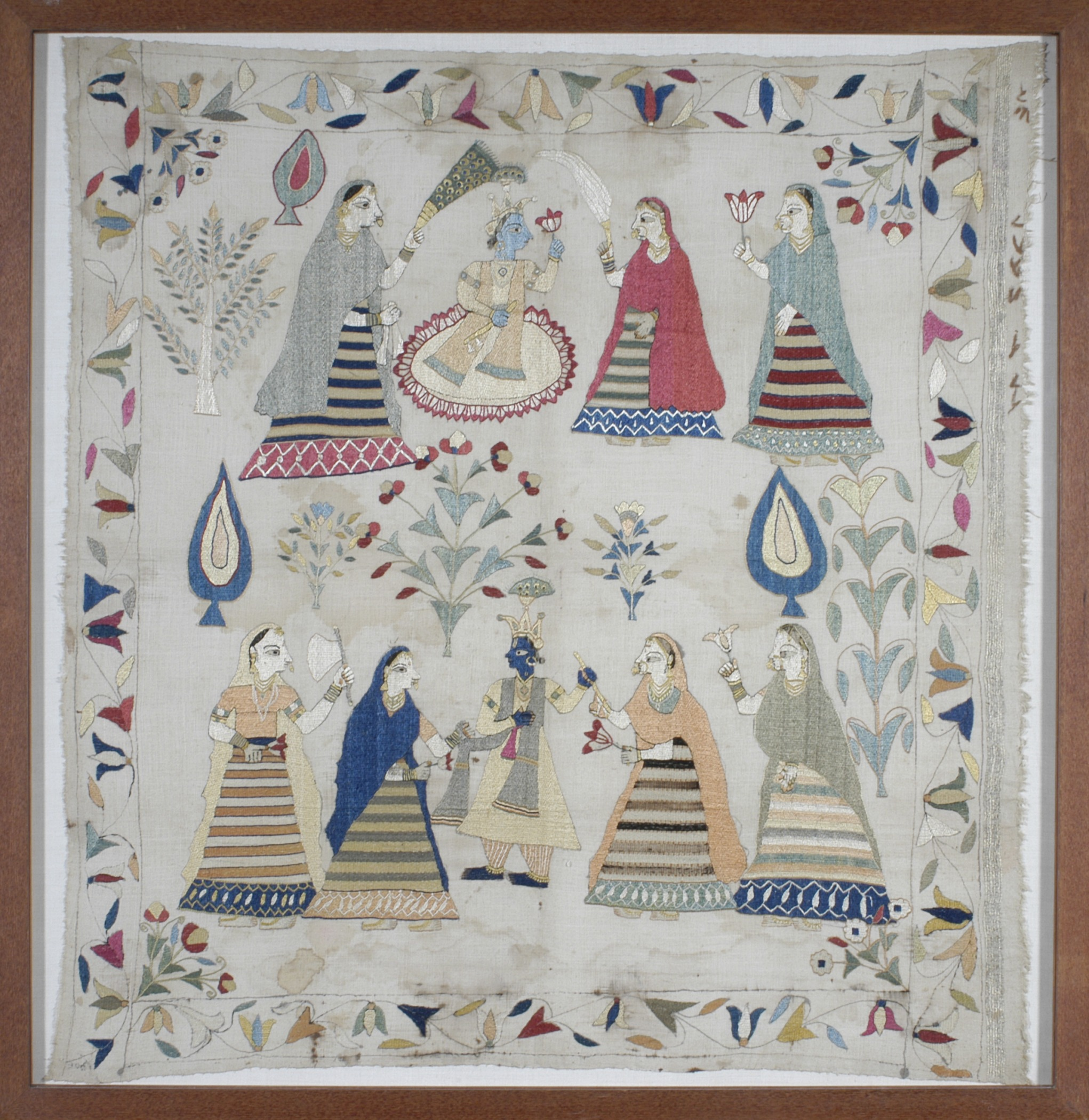
Scenes of Gopis Adoring Krishna.

In Kangra folk songs, the word Gopi is often used to mean Gujari, a woman from the Gurjar pastoral community. In Krishna stories, gopis are known as Krishna's cowherding companions. Because of this, songs about Krishna and the gopis are sometimes called Gujari songs in the Kangra region of Himachal Pradesh. These songs are also known as "morning songs" (bhyāgade). Historian Sarla mentioned a Gujari song. After that, Sudesh Kumari sang another song of the same type. She also called it a "morning song". The song was "Chandrauli", also known as Chandravali. In Krishna stories, Chandravali is described as one of Krishna's beloved gopis who belonged to the Gurjar community. The name comes from Sanskrit and means "collection of moons or moonlight". In Kangra tradition, Chandaravali is described as a woman with great beauty.

== Religion ==
In Himachal Pradesh they are religiously divided into two ethnoreligious groups: Muslim Gurjars and Hindu Gurjars. The majority of Gujjars (86%) in Himachal Pradesh are Muslim and they belonged to Sunni sect of Islam. But there are also Hindu Gujjars (14%) as a minority among Gujjars in the state.

The Gujjars of Himachal Pradesh are believed to have adopted Islam in the 17th century during the rule of Mughal emperor Aurangzeb in the Indian subcontinent.

== Population ==
As per 1999 estimates, Gurjars constituted 1.5% of Himachal Pradesh's total population.

Gurjars in Himachal Pradesh have a widespread presence across the state. As per the 2011 Census, the state's total population stands at 6,864,602, with Scheduled Tribes accounting for 392,126 individuals. Within this Tribal demographics, the number of Gurjars is 92,547, constituting 1.35% of the state's total population.

=== District wise population ===
Districts wise Gujjar population per 2011 census in Himachal Pradesh.

2011 census
Districts	Population
Solan	23,728
Kangra	11,390
Mandi	11,278
Sirmaur	10,545
Bilaspur	10,278
Chamba	9,784
Una	8,379
Shimla	3,157
Hamirpur	2,736
Kullu	1,246
Kinaur	17
Lahaul & Spiti	9

=== Historical population ===
Himachal Pradesh's Gujjar population was recorded in state census reports.

Historical population
Year	Pop.	±% p.a.
1881	906	—
1961	16,887	+3.72%
1971	20,634	+2.02%
1981	28,119	+3.14%
1991	33,028	+1.62%
2001	35,538	+0.74%
2011	92,547	+10.04%
source: 1881 census - 1961 census -1971 census - 1981 census - 1991 census - 2001 census - 2011 census

== Social status ==
Before the formation of the Himachal Pradesh state, Initially Gujjars were recognised as a scheduled tribe in Chamba district in 1950.

The Gujjars of Himachal Pradesh were classified as a Scheduled Tribe under the Indian government's general reservation scheme of positive discrimination, effective in 1976.

== Politics ==
While Gujjars form the smallest ethnic and religious minority in Chamba District, they have successfully established ties to many different groups and individuals around them, including politicians with the Indian National Congress, members of civil society, and Islamic organisations. In Saal valley they have connections with diverse groups, including American missionaries, Tribal right activists, and India Gurjar Mahasabha. However, the Ulamas from Deobandi influenced madrasas have had the crucial influence on them.

The constitutional amendments of 1992 facilitated increased political participation for Gujjars, particularly in those areas where they constitute a strong voting majority. Candidates from the Gujjar community often win elections within panchayats such as Baragaon when they are provided with reserved seats for Schedule tribes. In order to be successful in the election process, many of the voters expressed the need for candidates to create and maintain "good relationships" with other groups including General-caste Hindus, non-tribal Muslims and Gaddis. As an example, Hanif a Muslim Gujjar. The political philosophy of Hanif is to support and embrace his Gujjar identity while discreetly differentiating himself from his Muslim ancestry. His wife, Sheena, serves as a member of the panchayat as a true leader who supports Hanif. Together they advocate for women's rights and women’s education. The couple uses the changing political structure of India to work towards uniting and empowering the Gujjar community.

The voter turnout for Gujjar's has been consistent at a high level, in spite of doubts about the future. The local madrasa in Badagaon received funding from the government to emphasise the connection between this community's involvement in National Politics. Gujjar's in Chamba are reformulating their relationship with the Himachal state by accepting the rights of 'equal Citizenship' instead of relying on special privileges and tribally status, thereby allowing them to establish a more empowered relationship with the State.

== Socoi economic ==
=== Economy ===
The Gujjar community contributes greatly to the dairy industry in Himachal Pradesh, India. However, they face significant difficulties, including poverty, illiteracy, lack of access to healthcare and basic services due to their nomadic lifestyles. The nomadic practice further exacerbates Issu's (a government-supported economic program) difficulty providing support for Gujjar people and, as such, contributes to their already challenging lifestyle compared to other groups living in the same area.

=== Income ===
Most Gujjar people living in Chamba District have a monthly income between 5000 and 10000 Indian Rupees, which constitutes 44% of the population. On the other hand, approximately 24% earn less than 5000 Indian Rupees; therefore, they are struggling financially. Very few Gujjars (only 8%) earn higher monthly income levels, indicating that the Gujjar community requires additional support from economic programs, as well as jobs and social services, in order to help improve their quality of life.

== Occupation and landholding ==
=== Occupation ===
In Himachal Pradesh, the occupation of Gurjars include settled farming and semi-nomadic herding. Muslim tribal Gurjars in Himachal are mainly involved in dairy farming. As per 2016 data, the occupations of Gurjar men in the Baragaon area of Shimla district were: 42% work on their own land and also do manual labour work, 22% worked on own farms, 14% run small business, 7% do semi-skilled labour work, and 17% have private salaried jobs or owned bigger private businesses.

As per same study, the occupations of Gurjar women in the Baragaon area of Shimla district were: 79% work on their own farms, 13% do reproductive labor, 4% run small business, 3% do government jobs, and 1% have private salaried jobs.

=== Landholding ===
In 2016, in Baragaon area of Shimla district in Himachal Pradesh, landholding among Gurjars was distributed as follows: 48% own less than 0.4 acres, 27.5% own between 0.4 and 0.8 acres, 16.5% own between 0.8 and 1.2 acres, and 8% own more than 1.2 acres.

== Traditional medicine ==
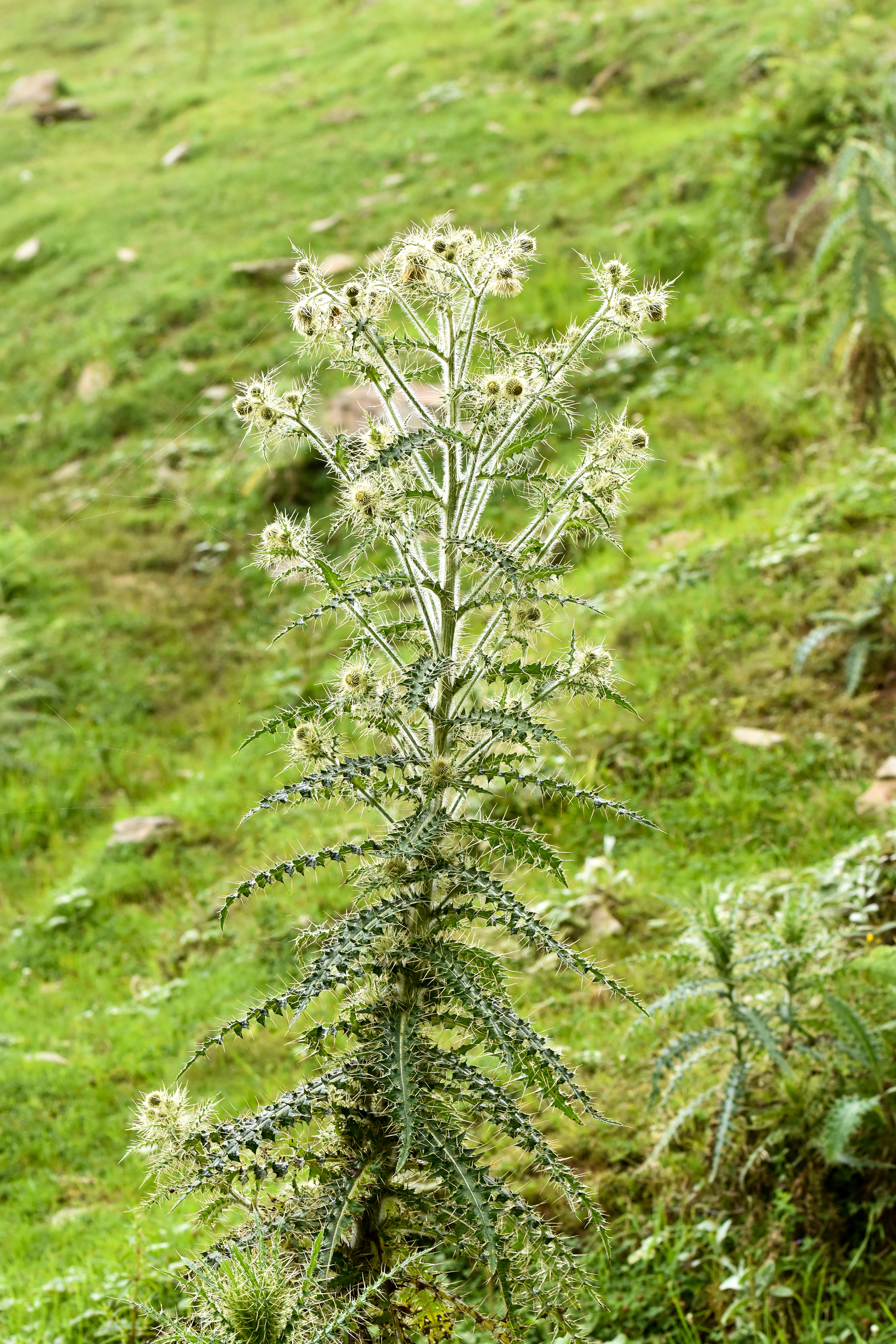
Thistle plant (Cirsium wallichii) found in Prashar Lake, Mandi district, Himachal Pradesh, is used in herbal steam therapy for joint pain and other health problems.

In Himachal Pradesh, tribal groups such as the Kiratas and Gurjars still use medicinal plants to treat diseases. A recent study conducted in Hamirpur district recorded Gurjars using 25 species from 19 families, many of which were newly documented. Single-herb remedies were used for indigestion, low milk, colic, fever, cold, mouth/eye/ear dieses and dog bite; mixed herbs for fracture, urinary problems, diarrhea and earache.

== Literacy and education ==
=== Literacy rate ===
The difference in literacy rates between females and males is large. Females represent a much lower literacy rate than Males. Over 50% of the Gujjar’s population have not attained any form of basic literacy skills, and only 1.7% has attained education beyond secondary school. Most Gujjars in the province of Himachal Pradesh only receive limited formal education and hold limited ability to read and write (23.8% can read/write at least up to grade IV); 11.9% of the population have attained at least some middle school education (class IX); and 4.6% have attained secondary school completion. Chamba district has the lowest literacy rate and Solan district has the highest.

A 2006 study conducted in the Chamba, Kangra, and Mandi districts of Himachal Pradesh found that the highest Gurjar literacy rate was in Mandi, followed by Kangra and Chamba districts.

=== Education ===
As the Deobandi School of Islam becomes more popular among the Gujjars in Himachal Pradesh, more emphasis on religious identity, education is now viewed in a different manner by the Gujjars. The use of madrassas and student hostels that offer both a mixture of Islamic studies and curriculum incorporating math, computer science, and many other subjects has increased the number of educated Gujjars. The madrassas are often located within the community, have locally born Gujjar teachers, and the teachers are trained within the denomination of Islam at Islamic seminaries. As a result, Gujjars are experiencing higher rates of educational attainment.

A 2006 study conducted mainly in the Chamba, Kangra, and Mandi districts of Himachal Pradesh found that approximately 40% of Gurjars were literate, 35% were neo-literate, and 25% were illiterate. Within these districts, in Chamba district, 50% were literate, 12% neo-literate, and 37.5% illiterate; in Mandi district, 30% were literate, 30% neo-literate, and 10% illiterate; and in Kangra district, 40% were literate, 35% neo-literate, and 25% illiterate.

== Bibliography ==
- Kapoor, P.C. (1994). A study on different aspects of minorities in Himachal Pradesh with special reference to "Gujjars". Himachal Pradesh Institute of Public Administration.
- Śarmā, Jagadīśa; Karma, Siṃha (2001). Gujjara: Janajātīya lokasaṃskr̥ti. Himācala Kalā Saṃskr̥ti Bhāshā Akādamī [गुज्जर: जनजातीय लोक संस्कृति। हिमाचल कला संस्कृति भाषा अकादमी। (Gurjara: Tribal Folk Culture. Himachal Art Culture Language Academy)] (in Hindi). Himachal Academy of Arts, Culture & Languages., eds.
- Bharadwaj, A. N. (1994). History and Culture of Himalayan Gujjars. Jay Kay Book House. pp. 96–140.
- Kumari, Neelam (2015). "Paradoxes of Tribal Development: A Case Study of Gujjars of Himachal Pradesh". The Indian Journal of Political Science. 76 (4): 853–858. ISSN 0019-5510. JSTOR 26575616.
- Sahni, Bindu (2012). ""Chos/Khads" and the Gujjar Settlements in the Himachal Pradesh During the Colonial Period". Proceedings of the Indian History Congress. 73: 826–835. ISSN 2249-1937. JSTOR 44156279.
- Turner, David H. (1992). "We will Always be Gujar: The Politics of Nomadism in Northern Himachal Pradesh". India International Centre Quarterly. 19 (1/2): 251–263. ISSN 0376-9771. JSTOR 23002235.
- Verma, V. (2000). Ban-Gujars: A Nomadic Tribe in Himachal Pradesh. B.R. Publishing Corporation. ISBN 978-81-7646-112-2.
- Sahni, Dr. Bindu (1 January 2020). Colonial Forest Acts & Their Impact on Pastrolist Gujjars of Himachal Pradesh (in Bengali). Walnut Publication. ISBN 978-9390261161.
- Axelby, R. (2017). Gaddis and Gujjars in Chamba District, Himachal Pradesh. In A. Shah, J. Lerche, R. Axelby, D. Benbabaali, B. Donegan, J. Raj, & V. Thakur (Eds.) Ground Down by Growth: Inequality in 21st century India (pp. 143–175). Pluto Press.
- Bhāratī, Ke Āra (2001). Chamba Himalaya: Amazing Land, Unique Culture. Indus Publishing. ISBN 978-81-7387-125-2.
- Pant, Shreekar; Arjun, Sharma; Virbala, Sharma (2020). Ethnobotany and Biodiversity Conservation. India: Indu Book Services. p. 212. ISBN 9789386754653.
