= Kanaura =

Kinnaura
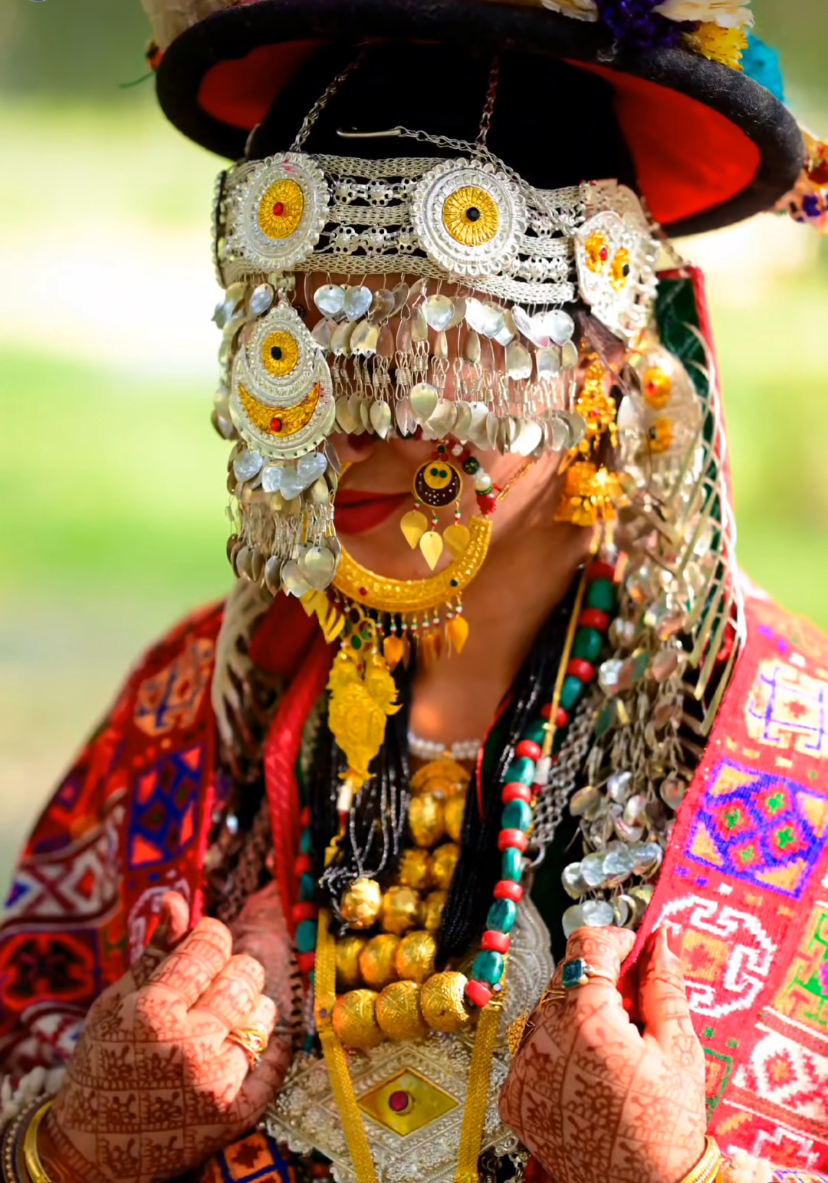
- A Kanaura women in traditional jewellery.

Total population
- 50,994 (2011)

Languages
- Kinnauri

Religion
- Majority; Hinduism; Minority; Tibetan Buddhism, Folk religion

Related ethnic groups
- Swangla, Bhot

The Kanaura are a tribal community found in Kinnaur district of Himachal Pradesh, India. They are also known as Kinnaura and are known for their reverence of Kinnaur Kailash.

== History ==
The Kinnaura community is considered as ancient community, residing in the region nearby to the Kinnaur Kailash and are one of the oldest community of the Himalayas.

There has been one of the prominent theories that Buddhism entered to the Tibet through Kinnaur and thereby having influence on the members of the community in the upper parts of the region. Though many researchers and historians have a different view, that the process was vice-versa and Buddhism in Himachal Pradesh was spread by Tibetan missionaries from Kinnaur and adjoining Lahaul and Spiti. When the region was under the Bushahr State, the Kanets of the Kinnaur were assimilated into the community and were given land ownership in the region by the kings.

== Culture ==
They have high reverence to Shiva and most of their folk songs and dances, which includes Kinnauri Nati is based on devotion and sagas of him. They considered them as one of the descendants of Shiva and have great reverence to the Kinnaur Kailash, with legends of their name being derived from the same. Besides Shaivik Hinduism, the community has deep influence of Tibetan Buddhism and local folk religions with belief in local gods called Deva. The upper part of the region has high influence of Buddhism, which can be seen in architecture being similar Tibetan Architecture styles with homes and temples having a rolling cylender. In the lower parts of Nilchar and Sangla Valley, the culture and traditions of the community is similar to the other Hindu communities and with a deep rooted tradition of worship of local deities.

Due to geographical isolation, the community has unique style of worship and celebrates festivals to pay tribute to their local deities for various reasons, most prominent of which is to protect the villages from evil spirits. In Kalpa region, the member of community celebrates Raulane festival with a 5,000 years old tradition to honour Saunis, a celestrial body to protect the villages from extreme weather conditions.

== Social status ==
They were classified as a Scheduled Tribe in state of Himachal Pradesh under the Indian government's reservation program of positive discrimination, under The Constitution (Scheduled Tribes) Order, 1950.
