= Indera Paul Singh =

Indian anthropologist (1928–2016)

- Born: 20 January 1928
- Died: 27 September 2016 (aged 88)
- Occupation: Anthropologist
- Board member of: Former Executive council and Academic council member of University of Delhi

Academic background
- Education: Doctor of Philosophy
- Alma mater: University of Delhi (M.A. and Ph.D.)
- Thesis: Inheritance of Fingerball Patterns in a Human Population (Ph.D.) (1959)

Academic work
- Discipline: Anthropology
- Sub-discipline: Physical anthropology
- Institutions: Former associate secretary general, International Union of Anthropological and Ethnological Sciences

Indera Paul Singh (20 January 1928 – 27 September 2016) was an Indian anthropologist who had served at prominent positions in several Indian and international anthropological organizations.

He was the first recipient of a doctorate degree in anthropology from the University of Delhi and also served as a member of its executive and academic council. He studied various branches of anthropology, and conducted field research in northern India and northwestern Himalayas.

== Education ==
Singh did Intermediate of Science in medical stream at the Hindu College of the University of Delhi in India, and completed his master's in anthropology from the university in 1950. From 1950 to 1952, he obtained "specialized training in anthropology" at the Franz Weidenreich Anthropological Institute of Goethe University Frankfurt in Germany. In 1959, he became the first ever student of the University of Delhi to obtain a Ph.D. with a specialty in anthropology.

He considered Oscar Lewis as his guru.

== Academic career and research ==
From February to June 1953, Singh worked as a research assistant for Oscar Lewis who was doing a field study in Rampur, a Jat-populated village, at Delhi in India with financial grant from the Ford Foundation's behavioral sciences division. He served the Department of Anthropology of the University of Delhi as a lecturer from 1953 to 1961, as a reader from 1953 to 1967, and as a professor from 1961 to 1971. He had been the head of the department from 16 June 1968 to 6 June 1979, and from 4 April 1981 to 3 April 1984. He was dean of the university's Faculty of Science from 1971 to 1975, and from 1983 to 1984, and university's proctor from 1973 to 1992. He was a member of the university's court from 1959 to 1993, of the executive council from 1973 to 1992, and of the academic council for over twenty years. He was also a member of India's University Grants Commission.

He had been Indian Social Science Academy's fellow, and had served as a member of the Asian Association of Bioethics (Tokyo), International Commission of Urban Anthropology, International Commission on Documentation, American Anthropological Association, Indian Academy of Sciences, and International Council for Scientific Development; and as the president of the Indian Anthropological Association, Indian Society for Human Ecology, and Indian Dermatoglyphic Association; and as the regional commissioner for the South Asia Regional Group of the International Commission on the Anthropology of Food and Food Problems, and as the associate secretary general of International Union of Anthropological and Ethnological Sciences; and as the secretary general of the Tenth International Congress of Anthropological Sciences and the Indian Science Congress Association (1975).

Vinay Kumar Srivastava states that Singh delved into anthropology's various branches and suggests that he was "one of the few anthropologists who tried to integrate the different branches of anthropology". Singh carried out a large amount of fieldwork in northern India and the northwestern Himalayas. He was one of the scholars who were of the view that the "castes among both the Sikhs and the Hindus can be put on the same hierarchical scale" and who executed field research in Punjab's villages for "investigating castes among the Sikhs".

== Written work ==
Milton Singer stated that Singh, along with Kathleen Gough and Surajit Sinha, was an academic who dealt with "cultural processes which are either recurrent or at least have strong parallels beyond the horizons of a particular time and space". According to Singer, Singh's analytical study of a Sikh village and of the changing traditions of Sikhs with regard to the dominant traditions of Hindus illustrated "a process of differentiation that is fairly characteristic in Indian civilization—the rise of dissenting sects". Singh's analysis showed that there is heterogeneity between the lower and upper castes.

Singh's and Mohinder Kumar Bhasin's coauthored book Anthropometry (1968) was assessed by Edward Eyre Hunt Jr. He viewed the approach of the authors as being similar to anthropometry's German subculture in spite of the book's origination at the University of Delhi, noting that P. C. Biswas (the founder of University of Delhi's Department of Anthropology) had received training from Eugen Fischer in Berlin. He suggested that "by and large" their work was "good" but expressed concerns over its "relevance to present-day research and training" in biological anthropology.

University of Oxford's Philip Stewart in 1991, while reviewing Singh's contributions to the first issue of commencing volume of the Journal of Human Ecology, noted that while at that time there was lack of "synthesis" between the two greatly varying approaches towards the study of human ecology – "biological adaptations" and "cultural adaptations" – Singh had worked on both of them. Stewart also pointed out some areas of studies where Singh could have done better.

Eight of Singh's research projects were awarded by various organizations from India and other countries.

== Death ==
Singh died at the age of 88 years on 27 September 2016.

== Works ==
Srivastava notes that Singh wrote 5 books and 202 articles.

=== Books coauthored ===
- Singh, Indera Paul; Bhasin, Mohinder Kumar (2004). A Manual of Biological Anthropology. Delhi, India: Kamla-Raj Enterprises. ISBN 978-8185264349. OCLC 70886634.
- Singh, Indera Paul; Bhasin, Mohinder Kumar (1968). Anthropometry. Delhi, India: Bharti Bhawan. LCCN 70909152. OCLC 1965040.

=== Books edited ===
- Arthur, Don Ramsay (1980). Singh, Indera Paul; Tiwari, Surendra Chandra; Vidyarthi, Lalita Prasad (eds.). Man and His Environment. Delhi, India: Concept. LCCN 80903701.

=== Selected papers ===
- Singh, Indera P.; Malik, S. L. (February 1978). "Growth Trends Among Male Bods of Ladakh — a High Altitude Population". American Journal of Physical Anthropology. 48 (2). Wiley: 171–175. doi:10.1002/ajpa.1330480208. PMID 637119.
- Singh, Indera P.; Bhasin, M. K.; Walter, H.; Bhasin, V.; et al. (March 1986). "Genetic Studies of Pangwalas, Transhumant and Settled Gaddis: 4. Colour Blindness, Mid-phalangeal Hair, Ear Lobe Attachment and Behavioural Traits". Anthropologischer Anzeiger. 44 (1). E. Schweizerbart'sche Verlagsbuchhandlung: 45–53. JSTOR 29539665. PMID 3485955.
- Singh, Indera P.; Bhasin, M. K.; Shil, Anu P.; Sharma, Madhu B.; et al. (December 1987). "Biology of the People of Sikkim, India. 2. Colour Blindness, Ear Lobe Attachment, Mid-phalangeal Hair and Behavioural Traits". Anthropologischer Anzeiger. 45 (4). E. Schweizerbart'sche Verlagsbuchhandlung: 351–360. doi:10.1127/anthranz/45/1987/351. JSTOR 29539829. PMID 3501697.
- Singh, Indera P.; Walter, H.; Strodtmann, H.; Hilling, M.; Bhasin, M. K.; Veerraju, P. (1981). "Transferrin Subtypes in Six Indian Population Samples". Human Heredity. 31 (3). Basel, Switzerland: Karger: 152–155. doi:10.1159/000153197. PMID 7262888.
- Singh, Indera P.; Kapoor, Satwanti; Kapoor, A. K.; Bhalla, R. (May 1985). "Parent–Offspring Correlation for Body Measurements and Subcutaneous Fat Distribution". Human Biology. 57 (2). Detroit, USA: Wayne State University Press: 141–150. JSTOR 41464745. PMID 3997123.
- Singh, Indera P.; Walter, H.; Stach, Martina; Bhasin, M. K. (August 1983). "Transferrin Subtypes in Four Northwest Indian Tribal Populations and Some Remarks on the Anthropological Value of this New Polymorphism". American Journal of Physical Anthropology. 61 (4): 423–428. doi:10.1002/ajpa.1330610404. PMID 6624886.

== See also ==
- Aparna Rao
- Georg Pfeffer
