= Lahaula =

The Lahaula are a tribal community found in Lahaul and Spiti district of Himachal Pradesh. They are of mixed origin, with their indigenous tongue having dialects deriving from the Pattani language and are the inhabitants of Lahaul.

== Community ==
In the early texts and records, there has been no such mention of the term Lahaula or Lahula being used for any distinctive tribe or community. Instead, the term was used to describe the inhabitants of the Lahaul Valley and nearby region, who were collectively grouped as a singular tribe under the Constitution (Scheduled Tribes) Order, 1950, with ommunity being found in several regions like Lahaul Valley, Pattan, Chamba-Lahaul, and lower Mayar Valleys. The term 'Lahule' connotes the inhabitants of Lahaul and the tribe is said to be originated from the aboriginal Munda tribe and Tibetans. The community is broadly divided into two groups based on their features either Indo-Aryan or Mongoloid group, and the language of the community is In fact there are alternative names of this language, such as Manchati, Manchad, Pattani, Chambeali, Chamba Lahuli, Lahuli, Swangla, Changsapa Boli. Apart from these, there are certain dialects of this language, which are also prevalent in groups and are combined under an umbrella of Lahuli–Spiti languages.

Though majority of the members are basically agrarian, some of them are also engaged in trade and export wheat, barley, ‘Kuth’ which is a herb, to Kolcuta. The region where they inhabits remain geographically isolated and in winter season due to snow, the region gets cut-off from the outside world.

== Society ==
Their society is ramified in upper castes, consisting of Brahmin and Rajput (Thakur), and lower castes consisting of artisan groups such as Badhi (musicians), Lohar (ironsmiths), Hali (tanners)and Chanals (fishermen). The community has a caste division, in which the majority of land and consolidation of political power remains with the Thakurs. Marriage in the same clan and outside of caste group is not allowed among the Lahaule tribal community. Just like many other tribal communities of the whole of the Indian subcontinent, they are oriented to religious customs and beliefs. Most of the people of this community are the followers of Hinduism and Buddhism, where the Hinduism is more prevalent among the Aryan Lahauls and Buddhism among those with Mongoloid genetics. Trilokinath temple is the holy site for both communities. Majority of Lahaulas are Thakurs and are divided into two groups, namely Arya Lahulas (those who profess Hinduism) and Boudh Rajputs (who follows Buddhism and resides in upper part of the valley).

They prefer to wear colourful attires and ornaments which are a major part of their costumes. Their house design and structure is unique in comparison to neighbouring communities as they do not have slanting roof due to low rainfall in the region. Their lifestyle is similar to the Bhots in many sphere such as marriage, dress and cuisine. They have distinct system of Polyandry, where the bride marries groom and his brothers, though with the time and modernisation the practice is rarely observed.

== Social status ==
Lahaula are recognized as Scheduled Tribe in state of Himachal Pradesh under the Indian government's reservation program of positive discrimination. Though many members of the community, belonging to the lower castes communities such as Hessis, Chanal, Halis, Lohars, Kolis and Dagis identifies them as Scheduled Castes.
