= Vilma Rose Hunt =

American scientist

Vilma Hunt
- Born: Vilma Dalton-Webb; November 15, 1926; Sydney, New South Wales, Australia
- Died: December 29, 2012 (aged 86); Gloucester, Massachusetts, United States
- Education: University of Sydney; Radcliffe Institute
- Spouse: Edward Eyre Hunt Jr.
- Children: Margaret Hunt; William Hunt; Louise Rounds; Kitty Hunt; Martine Lebret

Vilma Rose Hunt (November 15, 1926 – December 29, 2012) was a scientist noted for research into radiation and workplace safety for women. After beginning a dentistry career in Australia and New Zealand, Hunt traveled to the United States where she earned her A.M. in Physical Anthropology at Radcliffe College and began researching public health and radiation biology. In 1964, Hunt discovered that polonium 210 is a natural contaminant of tobacco, providing additional evidence for the link between smoking and bronchial cancer. In 1974, she wrote a 121-page report on workplace hazards for pregnant women, which made the front page of the New York Times. She published a book, Work and the Health of Women, in 1979. From 1979 to 1981, Hunt served as an administrator for the United States Environmental Protection Agency, enacting public health solutions to environmental contamination at sites like Love Canal, New York, and Three Mile Island Nuclear Generating Station, Pennsylvania. Hunt retired in Gloucester in 1985, though she served as an environmental consultant and visiting lecturer until her death.

== Personal life ==
Vilma Hunt was born in Sydney on November 15, 1926. She is the daughter of Margaret Rose (Lynch) Dalton-Webb and William Dalton-Webb, an electrician. When Vilma was seven years old, the Dalton-Webb family moved to Kempsey, New South Wales. She attended public school and graduated from high school in 1942. After graduation, during World War II, she enlisted in the women's auxiliary branch of the Royal Australian Air Force.

In 1952, Vilma travelled to Boston to study dentistry. She met Edward Eyre Hunt Jr. at the Forsyth Dental Infirmary. They married in 1952, moved to Gloucester, Massachusetts, and had four children: Margaret, William, Louise, Catherine and Martine (a foster daughter). Margaret would later become the chair of the women and gender studies department at Amherst College. Vilma and Edward retired in 1985.

== Career ==
=== Dentistry ===
Vilma Hunt began her career as a dentist. She earned her Bachelor of Dental Surgery at the University of Sydney in 1950, and served as a Junior Dental Officer with the New Zealand Department of Health from 1950 to 1952. She accepted a scholarship to study dentistry at Harvard University in 1952.

=== Anthropology and public health ===
After studying, interning, and lecturing on dentistry for several years, Hunt began studying anthropology. She earned her A.M. in Physical Anthropology from Radcliffe College in 1958 and began to conduct research with the Radcliffe Institute for Independent Study, from 1961 to 1963, and the Harvard School of Public Health, from 1962 to 1966. She received additional training in radiation biology from the Argonne National Laboratory, in Illinois, in the summer of 1963.

While at HSPH, Hunt tested a cigarette butt for radiation, on a hunch. She discovered high levels of Polonium-210, a radioactive element, and launched an investigation alongside colleague Edward P. Radford. The pair published their findings, titled "Polonium-210: A Volatile Radioelement in Cigarettes" in Science. The article came out on January 17, 1964—just six days after the surgeon general's report on the dangers of smoking was released. In 1964, Hunt was elected to Phi Beta Kappa.

=== Academia ===
Hunt taught and lectured for over three decades. From 1967 to 1969, she served as assistant professor of Environmental Health at the Yale University School of Medicine. From 1969 to 1972, she served as Assistant and associate professor of Environmental Health at Pennsylvania State University, where she was granted tenure in 1972. She would return to become Professor of Environmental Health from 1982 to 1985 before leaving to become a Mellon Research Fellow at the Massachusetts Institute of Technology in 1984. She received the National Endowment for the Humanities award in 1985.

=== Advocacy for Women ===
Outside of the classroom, Hunt conducted research into chemical hazards in the workplace, particularly in relation to reproductive health. On April 30, 1974, she published a 121-page report for the Department of Health, Education, and Welfare titled "Occupational Problems of Pregnant Women." Within the report, she wrote "We are all responsible for the health of future generations and we can no longer ignore a fact of life—reproduction and work are women's lot."

Elsewhere, she details the poor working conditions and hazardous exposures present in factories and shows their correlation to high infant mortality rates, birth defects, and miscarriages. Differing from previous research on the subject, she also includes male fertility in her research, demonstrating that high levels of radiation negatively affect male sperm count. Her report was read across the nation, and on March 14, 1976, it made the front page of New York Times.

A few years later, in 1979, Hunt published A Brief History of Women Workers and Hazards in the Workplace. In it, she discussed changing attitudes towards women's health concerns and the treatment of women in factories, and called for labor regulations to protect women from benzene, a toxic chemical. She commented on how quickly the presence of women in lead factories declined, after it was revealed that lead had disastrous effects on children and the reproductive system. Hunt attributed the slow-changing pace of laws around benzene factories to the lack of definitive research on whether benzene affects the fetus. Hunt criticized the government's slow action and called for the improvement of factory conditions, rather than the removal of women from the industry.

=== Environmental protection ===
Hunt also worked in conservation. She served on the Science Advisory Board of the United States Environmental Protection Agency from 1978 to 1979, where she was tasked with investigating and explaining chemical poisoning and radiation at environmental contamination sites, including the now-infamous Love Canal, NY, and Three Mile, PA.

=== Retirement ===
After she retired in 1985, Hunt became active in Gloucester local government, and served as a curator at the Magnolia Historical Society. She researched the history of uranium, and with the help of Harvard student Melissa Inouye, she began a book on the topic. At the time of Hunt's death in 2012, the text was incomplete.
