= Chulli =

Indian alcoholic beverage

Chulli is an alcoholic drink produced in Himachal Pradesh, India. It is a sweet and fruity alcoholic drink made from apples and apricots. It is also known as Ghanti or Kinnauri Ghanti. It is smooth and a very mild drink and can be considered a substitute for vodka. It can be consumed with water or any other cold drink. The consumption of Chulli helps to relieve cold and cough. It also has some healing properties. Dried wild apricots and apples are used to prepare the transparent Chulli. It is a popular beverage among the Kinnauri tribe of Himachal Pradesh.

== See also ==
- Lugdi
- Chuak
- List of Indian drinks
