= Pattani language =

Sino-Tibetan language spoken in India

Pattani
- Hendubhashe
- Native to: India
- Region: Himachal Pradesh
- Ethnicity: 20,000 (2002)
- Native speakers: 8,439 (2011 census); L2 speakers: 5,000 (1997)
- Language family: Sino-Tibetan: Tibeto-Kanauri ?; West Himalayish; Lahaulic; Pattani

Language codes
- ISO 639-3: lae
- Glottolog: patt1248
- ELP: Pattani

Pattani, also known as Manchad, is an endangered Sino-Tibetan language spoken in the Indian state of Himachal Pradesh

== Names ==
The language has a variety of names, the most prominent being Manchati, Manchad kad, Patani, Mellog kad, Chamba Lahuli, Swangla, Songloboli or Changsapa Boli. Its native name is Hendubhashe. The Indian census erroneously includes the language as a dialect of Gujarati.

== Distribution ==
Pattani is spoken in the Lahul Valley, Pattan, Chamba-Lahul, and lower Mayar valleys. There are also some speakers in Kullu and Manali cities, and in Kishtwar district, Jammu and Kashmir.

== General information ==
There are about 10,000 people in the western Himalayas who speak the Pattani Language. Pattani Language has several names. One of them is Manchad, which was given by the Tod valley people who live in the area where Manchad was originated. The religious belief of Manchad speakers is either Hinduism or Buddhism. Almost all of them can speak Hindi and Manchad is being increasingly restricted to home use only. Because there is no written tradition in Manchad, the article resources and stories of Manchad are usually recorded in Hindi or Tibetan orthography.

== Grammar ==
1. The three-way contrast in number: singular, dual and plural.
2. Gender is not grammatical and is lexically based.
3. The verbal agreement system: person-number elements are indicated in verbs.
4. The sentence structure: simple, compound and complex sentences.
5. Pattani Language has complex pronominalisation and a complex verbal system.

== Syntax ==
Pattani word order is subject–object–verb (SOV)

== Dialects ==
Ethnologue lists three Pattani dialects.

- Chamba-Lahuli (Western Pattani)
- Eastern Pattani
- Central Pattani
