= Hubert Walter (anthropologist) =

German anthropologist (1930–2008)

- Born: April 14, 1930; Charlottenburg, Berlin, Germany
- Died: December 6, 2008 (aged 78)
- Occupation: Anthropologist
- Spouse: Heide Krüger
- Children: Erk (born 1955); Kai (born 1959); Jörn (born 1960); Vibeke (born 1966)
- Parents: Hilde Walter (mother); Helmut Walter (father)

Academic background
- Education: Doctor of Philosophy
- Alma mater: University of Kiel (Ph.D.)
- Thesis: Investigations into the Inheritance of the Above-average or Below-average Height of Small and School Children (Ph.D.) (1953)
- Doctoral advisor: Hans Weinert

Academic work
- Discipline: Anthropology; Human Biology
- Institutions: Former professor of anthropology and human biology, University of Bremen
- Main interests: General anthropology Social Anthropology; Population Biology; Population Genetics; Serology; History of Science

Hubert Walter (April 14, 1930 — December 6, 2008) was a German anthropologist and human biologist.

Born in Berlin, he did a Ph.D. from the University of Kiel in 1953 and worked at various positions at the University of Münster, University of Mainz and University of Bremen. He taught anthropology at the University of Mainz from 1962 to 1974. From 1974 to until his retirement in 1995, he was a professor of anthropology and human biology at the University of Bremen. He received several honors and honorary memberships from various universities and anthropological organizations, including an honorary doctorate from the University of Athens in 1998 and an honorary membership from the European Anthropological Association in 2008. Along with anthropology, genetics and serology, his research interests also included the history of science.

He died at the age of 78 years because of the consequential complications from a stroke that had occurred to him 11 months earlier from his death.

== Early life and family ==
Walter was born to Hilde and Helmut Walter on 14 April 1930 at Charlottenburg in Berlin, Germany. His father was a painter. In 1934, the family moved to Einbeck, where at the Goethe School in 1950, he completed his Abitur. He married Heide Krüger in 1954. She was his former schoolmate, and she died in 1995. They had 3 sons and 1 daughter, namely Erk, Kai, Jörn and Vibeke.

== Education and academic career ==
From 1950 to 1953, Walter studied anthropology, biology, pre and early history, and psychology at the University of Kiel. On 18 July 1953, he completed his Ph.D. from the University of Kiel under the supervision of Hans Weinert. The subject of his doctoral dissertation was "Investigations Into the Inheritance of the Above-average or Below-average Height of Small and School Children". From 1955 to 1958, he worked at the University of Münster's Institute of Human Genetics as a guest assistant. In 1958, he became a research assistant of Egon Freiherr von Eickstedt at the University of Mainz's Institute for Anthropology. In 1962, he qualified for professorship from the university's Faculty of Natural Sciences for his social anthropological study on the populace of Ruhr.

He worked at the Faculty of Natural Sciences of the University of Mainz as an associate professor from 23 August 1966 to 29 April 1971 and as a professor from 30 April 1971 to 1973. From 1971 to 1973, he was also designated as a scientific councilor at the university, and from 1973 to 1974, he served as the head of the university's Department of Anthropology.

He went to India twice as a visiting fellow at the Andhra University and the University of Delhi in 1972 and 1982, respectively. From 1974 to 1995, he worked at the University of Bremen as a professor of anthropology and human biology, and retired in 1995. From 1977 to 2008, he was the editor of Anthropologischer Anzeiger and had also served as the editor-in-chief of the journal.

== Research ==
The prime areas of focus for his studies had been general anthropology, social anthropology, population biology, population genetics, serology, and history of science.

He also did research on the Indian peoples' genetic variability with respect to the country's ethno–social, regional, and linguistic structure.

== Honors and memberships ==
He received a fellowship from the Indian Anthropological Association in 1982. In 1990, the József Attila University gave him the Lajos Bartucz Medal. In 1991, the Slovak Association of Anthropology granted him an honorary membership, and in 1993, The Asiatic Society gave him a medal named after Thomas Nelson Annandale. He was given a "golden medal" by the Comenius University in 1994. In 1998, he was esteemed with an honorary doctorate by the University of Athens's Faculty of Medicine. In 2005 and 2008, he received honorary memberships from the German Association of Anthropology and European Anthropological Association, respectively.

In 2013, the German Anthropological Society gave an award named after Hubert Walter to Jan Novacek, a biological anthropologist and an anatomist, for his "outstanding performance in the field of physical anthropology".

== Death ==
On 2 January 2008, Walter had a stroke and later on 6 December 2008, he died due to the complications that had resulted from that stroke.

== Works ==
=== Books ===
- Walter, Hubert; Bhasin, Mohinder Kumar (2001). Genetics of Castes and Tribes of India. Peoples of Indian Region. Delhi, India: Kamla–Raj Enterprises. ISBN 978-8185264264. LCCN 2001436336. OCLC 237571063.
- Walter, Hubert (1998). Populationsgenetik der Blutgruppensysteme des Menschen [Population Genetics of the Human Blood Group Systems] (in German). Stuttgart, Germany: E. Schweizerbart'sche Verlagsbuchhandlung.
- Walter, Hubert; Bhasin, Mohinder Kumar; Danker-Hopfe, Heidi (1992). Distribution of Genetical, Morphological, and Behavioural Traits Among the Peoples of Indian Region: Bangladesh, Bhutan, India, Maldives, Nepal, Pakistan, Sri Lanka. Biology of the Peoples of Indian Region. Delhi, India: Kamla–Raj Enterprises. ISBN 978-8185264059. LCCN 92909647. OCLC 231621299.
- Walter, Hubert (1978). Sexual– und Entwicklungsbiologie des Menschen [Human Sexual and Developmental Biology]. Wissenschaftliche Reihe (in German). Munich, Germany: Deutscher Taschenbuch Verlag. LCCN 78380351. OCLC 721967064.
- Walter, Hubert (1970). Grundriß der Anthropologie. Mit 117 Abb [Outline of Anthropology. With 117 fig]. Moderne Biologie (in German). Munich, Germany; Basel, Switzerland; Vienna, Austria: BLV Verlag. LCCN 72574903. OCLC 652300690.
- Walter, Hubert; Schwidetzky, Ilse (1967). Untersuchungen zur Anthropologischen Gliederung Westfalens [Studies on the Anthropological Structure of Westphalia] (in German). Münster, Germany: Aschendorff. doi:10.1002/ajpa.1330280225. OCLC 829662991.

=== Selected papers ===
- Walter, Hubert; Rickards, Olga; Biondi, Gianfranco; De Stefano, Gian Franco; et al. (April 1992). "Genetic structure of the population of Sicily". American Journal of Physical Anthropology. 87 (4): 395–406. doi:10.1002/ajpa.1330870403. PMID 1533751.
- Walter, H.; Das, B. M.; Gilbert, K.; Lindenberg, P.; et al. (December 1987). "Genetic variation of five blood group polymorphisms in ten populations of Assam, India". International Journal of Anthropology. 2 (4). Springer: 325–340. doi:10.1007/BF02443992. S2CID 83775262.
- Walter, Hubert; Pálsson, J.O.P.; Bajatzadeh, Mansur (1970). "Sero–genetical Studies in Ireland". Human Heredity. 20 (2). Basel, Switzerland: Karger: 231–239. doi:10.1159/000152315. PMID 4099118.
- Walter, Hubert; Bajatzadeh, Mansur (July 1968). "Serumprotein Polymorphisms in Iran". Humangenetik. 6 (1). Springer: 40–54. doi:10.1007/BF00287153. PMID 5699893. S2CID 12910813.
- Walter, H.; Bhasin, M. K.; Chahal, S. M. S.; Bhardwaj, Veena; et al. (December 1986). "Biology of the People of Sikkim, India: 1. Studies on the Variability of Genetic Markers". Zeitschrift für Morphologie und Anthropologie. 77 (1). E. Schweizerbart'sche Verlagsbuchhandlung: 49–86. JSTOR 25757214. PMID 3471011.
- Walter, Hubert; Bajatzadeh, Mansur (September 1969). "Investigations on the Distribution of Blood and Serum Groups in Iran". Human Biology. 41 (3). Wayne State University Press: 401–415. JSTOR 41435780. PMID 5372296.

== See also ==
- Edward Eyre Hunt Jr.
