= Raulane festival =

Indian dance festival

Participants in traditional attire during the Raulane festival in Kinnaur, Himachal Pradesh, India.

The Raulane festival is a sacred and ritualistic dance festival held annually in Kinnaur valley in Himachal Pradesh, India. It is celebrated to mark the end of the winter season and as a farewell to the mythical mountain fairies, called Saunis and considered guardian spirits, for protecting lower lands before returning to upper meadows (called Kanda) at the beginning of spring.

The tradition is believed to be 5,000 years old. It features two men portraying Raula and Raulane as groom and bride respectively who wear handcrafted masks and perform devotional dances to honor the saunis.

While the festival is typically an annual tradition, it is suspended during times of drought.

== Regional variations and observance ==
The Raulane ritual is associated primarily with Kalpa in the Kinnaur district of Himachal Pradesh. Accounts of the festival also describe village-specific variations in its observance, including differences in timing and local ritual practices. The ceremony generally takes place in late winter or early spring, although its date is not fixed across all villages. The Raula and Raulane are traditionally represented as a ceremonial groom and bride, with both roles performed by men.
