= Edward Eyre Hunt Jr. =

American anthropologist and human biologist

- Born: 1922; Springfield, Ohio, US
- Died: 1991 (aged 68–69); Magnolia, Massachusetts, US
- Other name: Ed Hunt
- Occupations: Anthropologist; Human biologist
- Spouse: Vilma Rose Hunt
- Children: Margaret Hunt; William Hunt; Louise Rounds; Catherine Hunt; Martine Lebret
- Parents: Edward Eyre Hunt (father); Virginia Lloyd Hunt (mother)

Academic background
- Education: Doctor of Philosophy
- Alma mater: Harvard College
- Doctoral advisor: Earnest Albert Hooton

Academic work
- Discipline: Anthropology, Human biology
- Sub-discipline: Biological anthropology
- Influenced: Carleton S. Coon, Stanley M. Garn, Paul T. Baker

Edward Eyre Hunt Jr. (1922 — 1991) (also known as Ed Hunt) was an American physical anthropologist and human biologist. He did bachelor's, master's and a Ph.D. from the Harvard University in 1942, 1949 and 1951, respectively. He worked at several academic institutions including the Harvard University, City University of New York, Yale University and Pennsylvania State University until his retirement in 1985.

He was a co-founder of the United States' Dental Anthropological Association, and is viewed by some academics as one of the founders of applied medical anthropology. He died at the age of nearly 69 years because of an embolism that was developed after he underwent a gallbladder surgery. He was married to Vilma Rose Hunt.

== Family ==
Hunt was born in 1922 at Springfield, Ohio to Edward Eyre Hunt (Sr.) and Virginia Lloyd Fox Hunt. Edward Hunt (Sr.) (1885–1953) was an economist and war correspondent who had worked in the administrations of Warren Harding, Herbert Hoover, and Franklin Delano Roosevelt. Virginia Hunt (1888–1977) was an editor, goldsmith, painter and writer.

He was married to Vilma Rose Hunt. In 1952, Vilma traveled to Boston to study dentistry. She met Ed Hunt at the Forsyth Dental Infirmary. They married in 1952, moved to Gloucester, Massachusetts, and had four children: Margaret, William, Louise Rounds, and Catherine. They also fostered a daughter, Martine Lebret. Margaret became the chair of the women and gender studies department at Amherst College. Vilma and Ed Hunt retired in 1985.

== Education and academic career ==
Ed Hunt completed his B.A. from the Harvard College in 1942. After completing his bachelor's, he served in the United States military as a "psychology statistician" for the "Flying Safety Branch" of the United States Army Air Corps for a period of four years. He rejoined Harvard in 1946, and started his graduate work in the subject of physical anthropology. He did an anthropological study on the "depopulation of Yap" in Micronesia which was sponsored by the United States Navy. He utilized the data from the study to complete his M.A. and Ph.D. at the Harvard University in 1949 and 1951, respectively. His doctoral advisor was Earnest Albert Hooton.

From 1951 to 1966, Hunt worked at the Harvard University as "statistics instructor" at Harvard's Forsyth Dental Infirmary in Boston and as a lecturer of anthropology, with the exception of 1956. In 1956, he worked as a visiting lecturer at the University of Melbourne's Department of Anatomy under the Fulbright Scholar Program. Between 1966 and 1969, he served at the City University of New York as a professor of anthropology and at the Yale Medical School as an assistant professor. From 1969 to until his retirement in 1985, he served as a professor of anthropology at the Pennsylvania State University. In 1986, he co-founded the Dental Anthropological Association (US).

== Research ==
Ed Hunt was a member of several research focused organizations which included the American Anthropology Association, American Eugenics Society, and American Society of Human Genetics. His prime area of research were the "evolutionary aspects of dental and skeletal morphogenesis, and human growth and development". His research subjects included body composition, demography, dermatoglyphics, history of anthropology, primate behavior, and somatology. He also investigated the ideas which contradicted the conventional scientific beliefs. He had done a through research on Bigfoot's "possible existence" and concluded that there was not adequate proof for Bigfoot's existence.

Hunt wanted the focal point of the whole field of biological anthropology to be "causes" instead of "descriptions". Binghamton University's Gary D. James noted that Hunt's suggested studying approach that growth studies should focus on "causes for individual and population variability" contributed in "changing the study of growth from a largely descriptive science to one focused on variation". According to Paul T. Baker, he played a key role in changing "physical anthropology from a descriptive science into one with a Darwinian and problem-solving orientation". According to the anthropologists Marcha Flint and Leslie Sue Lieberman, he promoted the bio-cultural perspective in the field of human biology and he was one of the originators of applied medical anthropology. Binghamton University's Gary D. James noted that the research work of some of his contemporary scholars including Carleton S. Coon, Stanley M. Garn and Paul T. Baker was "strongly influenced" by Hunt. Hunt was versed in the use of statistics. According to Flint and Lieberman, he pioneered the application of statistics to the fields of physical anthropology and human biology.

== Death ==
Hunt died in 1991 at Magnolia, Massachusetts. He had undergone a surgery of the gallbladder. However, after the surgery, an embolism occurred, resulting in his death. In his youth, he had also had Hodgkin's disease, but that was completely cured.

== Works ==
=== Books ===
- Logan, Michael H.; Hunt, Edward E. (1978). Logan, Michael H. (ed.). Health and the Human Condition: Perspectives on Medical Anthropology. North Scituate, Massachusetts, USA: Duxbury Press. ISBN 978-0878721405. LCCN 77022936. OCLC 715153690.
- Coon, Carleton S.; Hunt, Edward E. (1974). The Living Races of Man (5th ed.). New York, USA: Knopf. OCLC 1070340323.
- Hunt, Edward E. (1949). The Micronesians of Yap and Their Depopulation: Report of the Peabody Museum Expedition to Yap Island, Micronesia, 1947–1948. Coordinated Investigation of Micronesian Anthropology, Report No. 24. Cambridge, Massachusetts, USA: Peabody Museum of Archaeology and Ethnology, Harvard University. LCCN 56001473. OCLC 3441050.

=== Selected papers ===
- Hunt, Edward E.; Moorrees, Coenraad F. A.; Fanning, Elizabeth A. (November 1, 1963). "Age Variation of Formation Stages for Ten Permanent Teeth". Journal of Dental Research. 42 (6). Sage Journals: 1490–1502. doi:10.1177/00220345630420062701. PMID 14081973. S2CID 13883597.
- Hunt, Edward E.; Moorrees, Coenraad F. A.; Fanning, Elizabeth A. (June 1963). "Formation and Resorption of Three Deciduous Teeth in Children". American Journal of Physical Anthropology. 21 (2). Wiley: 205–213. doi:10.1002/ajpa.1330210212. PMID 14110696.
- Hunt, Edward E.; Gleiser, Izaac (June 1955). "The Permanent Mandibular First Molar: Its Calcification, Eruption and Decay". American Journal of Physical Anthropology. 13 (2). Wiley: 253–283. doi:10.1002/ajpa.1330130206. PMID 13258780.
- Hunt, Edward E.; Škerlj, Božo; Brožek, Josef; Chen, Kung–Pei; et al. (December 1953). "Subcutaneous Fat and Age Changes in Body Build and Body Form in Women". American Journal of Physical Anthropology. 11 (4). Wiley: 577–600. doi:10.1002/ajpa.1330110406. PMID 13124473.
- Hunt, Edward E.; Brace, C. Loring; Brown, T.; Townsend, G. C.; et al. (April 1980). "Australian Tooth–Size Clines and the Death of a Stereotype [and Comments and Reply]". Current Anthropology. 21 (2). University of Chicago Press: 141–164. doi:10.1086/202426. S2CID 59496676.
- Hunt, Edward E.; Teleki, G.; Pfifferling, J. H. (November 1976). "Demographic Observations (1963–1973) on the Chimpanzees of Gombe National Park, Tanzania". Journal of Human Evolution. 5 (6). Elsevier: 559–598. Bibcode:1976JHumE...5..559T. doi:10.1016/0047-2484(76)90004-X. S2CID 83900066.

== See also ==
- Hubert Walter (anthropologist)
