= Gaddis =

Indian community

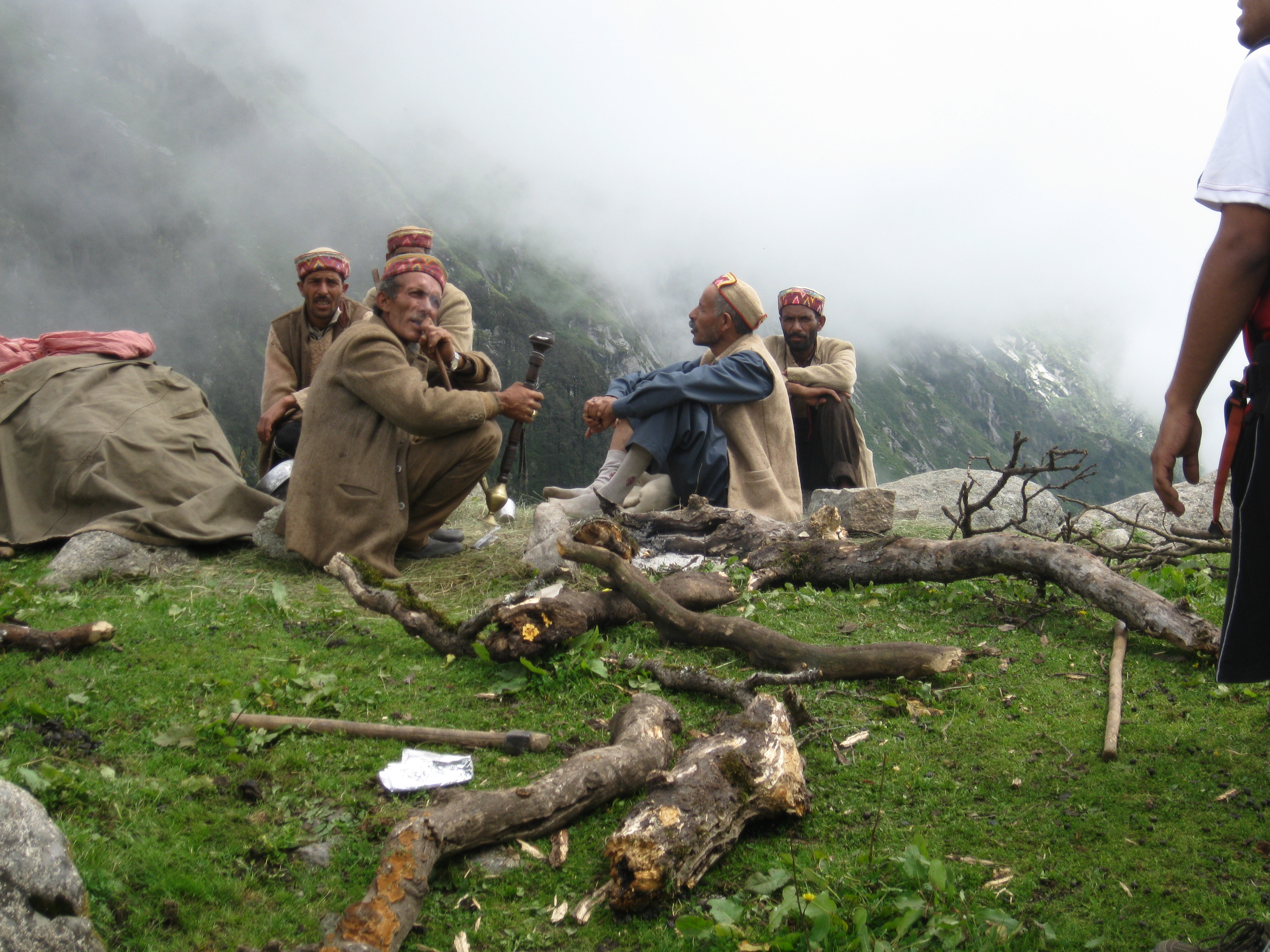
- A group of Gaddi shepherds.

Total population
- 226,119

Regions with significant populations
- Himachal Pradesh: 178,130
- Jammu and Kashmir: 46,489
- Nepal: c. 1,500

Languages
- Gaddi

Related ethnic groups
- Himachali Gurjars, Pangwals, Hattee, other Indo-Aryans

The Gaddi is a semi-pastoral community living mainly in the high remote areas of Himachal Pradesh and Jammu and Kashmir in India.

== Population ==
According to the 2011 Census of India, the Gaddi population was 178,130 in Himachal Pradesh and 46,489 in Jammu Kashmir. The Gaddis of Himachal Pradesh had an adult sex ratio of 1014 and a literacy rate of 73.3, whereas those of Jammu and Kashmir had a sex ratio of 953 and a literacy rate of 53.5. reservation system. There is a small Gaddi community in Nepal of around 1,500.

== Classification ==
The Gaddi community includes people from multiple castes. The castes within the community are variously categorised as Scheduled Tribes, Scheduled Castes and Other Backward Classes by the Government of Himachal Pradesh. The castes that are not listed as Scheduled Tribe, especially the Brahmins, Rajputs and Khatris, fall under Other Backward Classes, with the remaining lower castes, including the Sippy, Halli, Dhogri, Daggi, Rhadey and Baddi, fall within Scheduled Castes category. The Gaddis are dominant in the districts of Kangra, Chamba and Una districts, having significant hold on the local politics.

== Tradition ==
Gaddis' traditional practices and habits are changing rapidly with India's modernisation. In 2024, an exhibit "Journey across the Himalayas" was held in New Delhi, sharing about Gaddis' way of life and modernity.

== Gallery ==
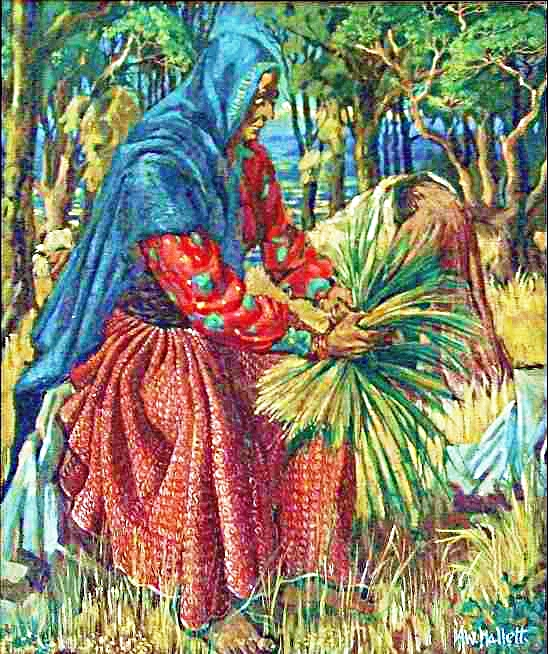
Gaddi woman mowing, Alfred Hallett c. 1980

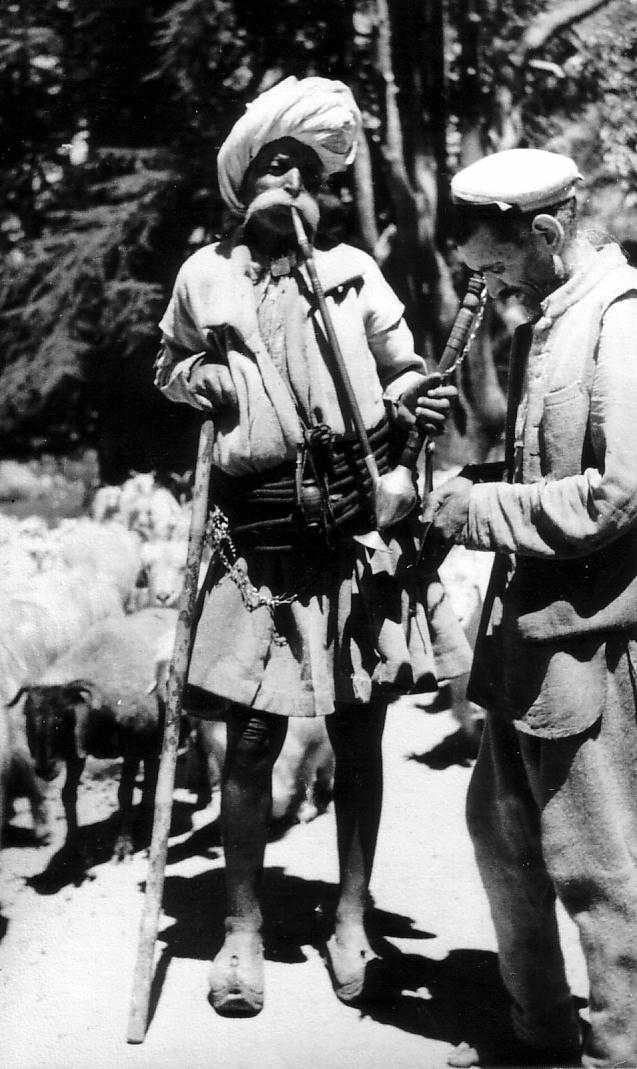
Gaddi men near Dharamshala, 1980

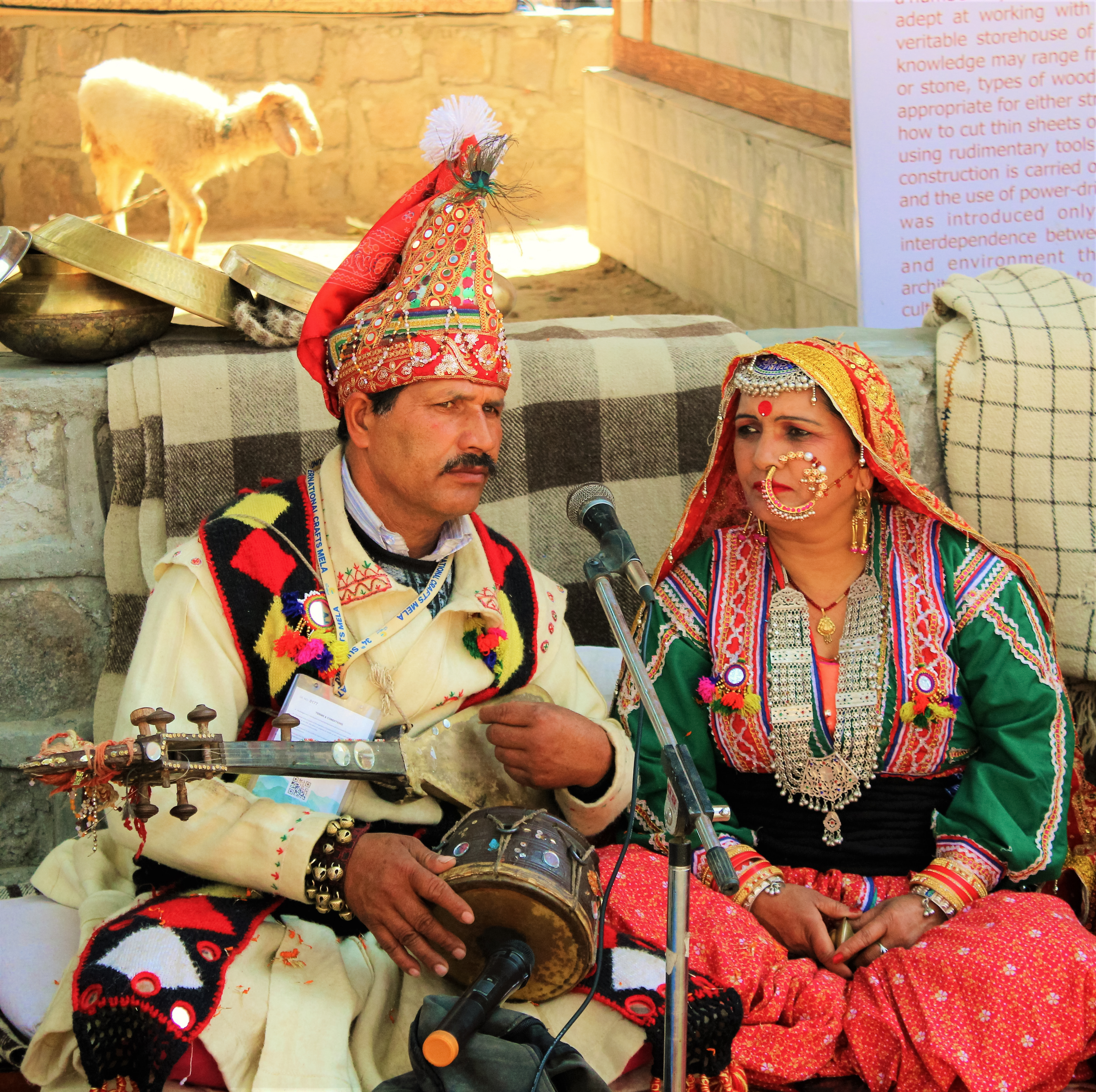
Gaddi artisans at Suraj Kund fest

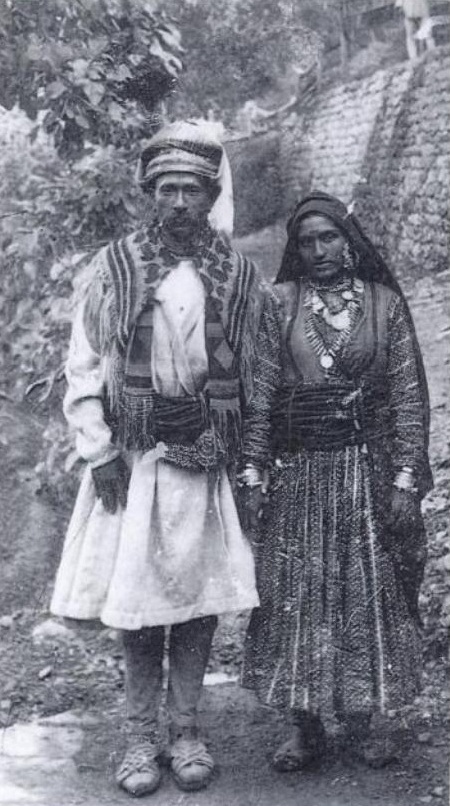
Gaddi Couple
