= Pangwala people =

Tribal Community in Himachal Pradesh

Pangwala
𑚞𑚫𑚌𑚦𑚭𑚪𑚯
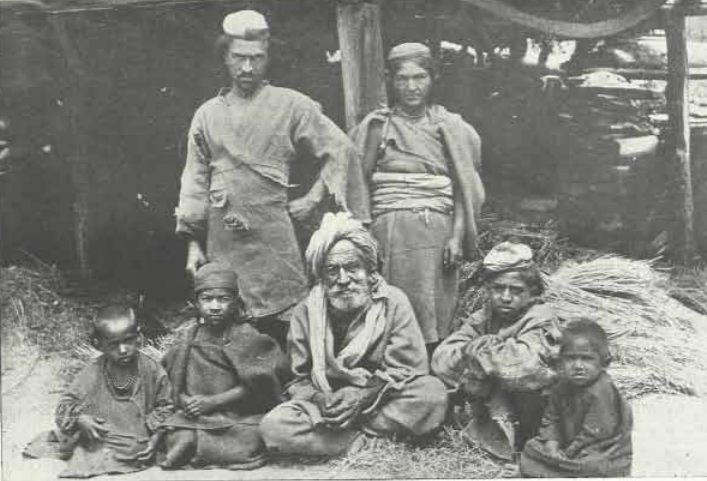
- A Pangwala family of Salhi village in Pangi Valley.

Total population
- 17,562 (2011)

Regions with significant populations
- Pangi Valley (Himachal Pradesh)

Languages
- Pangwali

Religion
- Hinduism

Related ethnic groups
- Gaddis, Bhot

Pangwala people (Pangwal or Pangwale) are an indigenous community primarily inhabiting the Pangi Valley of Chamba district in the Indian state of Himachal Pradesh. They possess a distinct cultural identity, language, and traditions that have developed in the geographically isolated Himalayan region.

== Geography ==
The Pangwala people are concentrated in the Pangi Valley, a remote mountainous region in the northwestern Himalayas. The valley is characterized by rugged terrain, high-altitude settlements, and seasonal connectivity with the rest of Himachal Pradesh, which has historically influenced the community's way of life and cultural development.

== History ==
The Pangwala people are regarded as the traditional inhabitants of the Pangi Valley. They might have migrated to Pangi valley from areas like Kashmir, Chamba, and Lahaul. Though there have been other theories regarding the origins of the community, one of which is an oral tradition which states that in the earlier times, those individuals and persons who were given capital punishment during the reign of Chamba State were banished and incarcerete to the Pangi valley because of the geographical isolation. With the time people living in the region formed their community of their own and due to their history being closely associated with the region's geographical isolation, it has contributed to the preservation of their unique customs, social organization, language, and traditional occupations. Over time, improved transportation and administrative integration have increased interaction with neighboring regions, while many aspects of their cultural heritage continue to be maintained.

== Culture ==
=== Society ===
The Pangwalas are not a singular tribe, instead a cluster of castes and communities inhabiting the Pangi Valley region and the historical isolation with the outside world has shaped them as a unique group. They are recognized as a singular tribe, yet they have a internalized division of caste in their society. The community consists of upper caste Thakurs and Brahmins, who were landlords and artisans groups which includes Scheduled Castes communities such as Lohars, Chanals and Halis. The caste system is not rigid with no traces of organized discrimination or untouchability against the scheduled castes, with freedom to Scheduled Castes to interact with upper castes and playing important role in social and religious activities.

=== Language ===
The native language of Pangwalas is Pangwali. While Pangwali does not possess a written literature, the community maintains a rich oral tradition composed of traditional folk songs and stories passed down through generations. In local terms, the language is called Pangi and is different from other language of the Chamba. Despite being historical interactions with the Bhots, majority Pangwals do not understand Bhotia language and neither it has any influence on the Pangi language.

== Scheduled tribe status ==
Owing to its geographical isolation, seasonal inaccessibility, economic underdevelopment, and distinct cultural characteristics, the Pangwalas were recognized as a Scheduled Tribe in 1966, and Pangi tehsil was subsequently notified as a Scheduled Area under the Scheduled Areas (Himachal Pradesh) Order, 1975.

As of 2011 census, their population in Himachal Pradesh was 17,562.
