= Bodh people =

Ethnic group of Himachal Pradesh, India

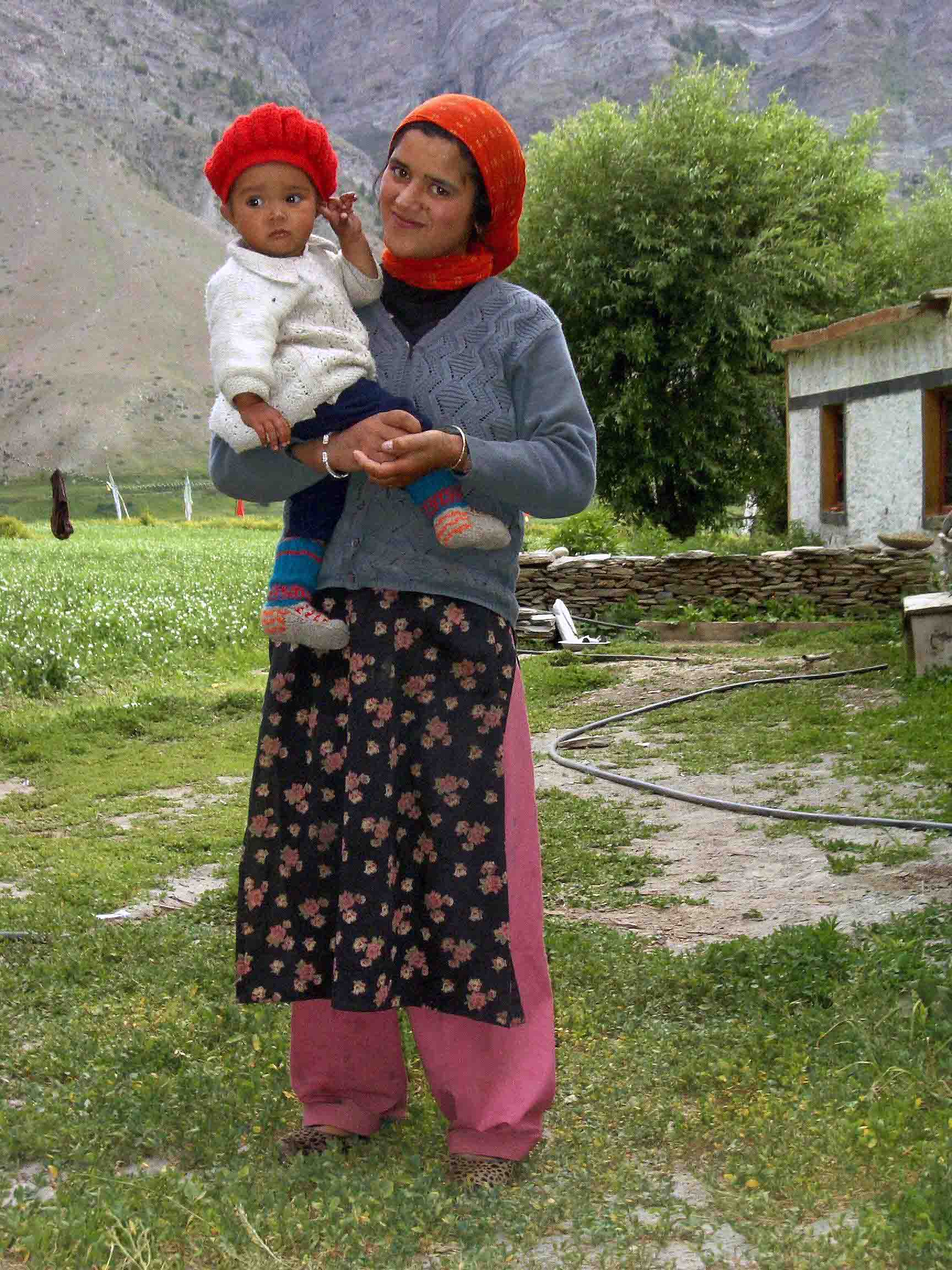
Bodh mother and child near Gandhola Monastery

The Bodh people, also known as Khas Bhodi, are an ethnic group of Himachal Pradesh, India. They are found in Lahaul tehsil, Lahaul and Spiti district, predominantly in the Bhaga and Chandra valleys, but also to a lesser extent in Pattani valley, Miyar Valley, in the upper reaches of Pangi, Himachal Pradesh and Paddar valley, Jammu and Kashmir. Their religion is predominantly Buddhism with animistic and shaivite practices. Caste wise, they are identified as Rajput, Thakur or Kshetri although caste rules are not as rigid as in the plains. Historically, 3-4 prominent families of the area were accorded the titles of Rana, Wazir or Thakur by the kings of Chamba, Kullu or Ladakh for the purpose of general administration and revenue collection. They have a mix of martial traditions alongside shamanistic and lamaistic beliefs. Certain families/clans used to be significant zamindars/jagirdars. There is a significant cultural and ethnic mixing due to the region passing under the hegemony of rulers of Ladakh, Kullu and Chamba over the last many centuries. The language spoken differs from valley to valley with some dialects being very close to Kumaoni, while others are mixed with Chambyali and Dari. They are progressive, enterprising, honest and were involved in the centuries old India-Tibet-Nepal trading routes. Organized into family groups/clans with clan names ending in the suffix "-pa" (eg - Barpa, Karpa, Tholakpa, Cherjipa, Gerumshingpa, Khingopa) similar to the "-ta" suffix (eg- Khimta, Zinta, Brakta, Bragta, etc.)found in the family/clan names of the Simla area.

They use a native tree, Corylus jacquemontii as fuel source (house fires), fodder (for livestock) and timber but the trees also yield edible nuts. They can be used with parched rice.

== Art and craft in Himachal ==
The art and craft of any region is a reflection of its environment, people and traditions. This statement is apt for Negi and Bodh tribes of Himachal Pradesh, which borrows elements from its scenic surroundings to create “pahari” jewellery, breathing a sense of rigour and sturdiness.

While some communities have unique traditions, some ornaments are common to all. These include neck ornaments like hansli or small pendants called toke and the most cherished necklaces called coin necklaces.

== See also ==
- Bhoti Kinnauri

== Bibliography ==
- Bhasin, M. K.; Singh, Indera P.; Walter, H.; Bhardwaj, Veena (1983). "Genetic study of five population groups of Lahaul-Spiti and Kulu districts, Himachal Pradesh". Zeitschrift für Morphologie und Anthropologie. 74 (1): 13–38. doi:10.1127/zma/74/1983/13. ISSN 0044-314X. JSTOR 25756637. PMID 6858303.
- Singh, Kanwaljit; Bhasin, MK; Singh, IP (2008). "Age changes in biological variables among high altitude Bodh males of Lahaul Tehsil, Lahaul-spiti District, Himachal Pradesh, India". Anthropologist. 10 (3): 193–202. doi:10.1080/09720073.2008.11891046. S2CID 79747107.
