= Swangla =

Tribal community in Lahaul and Spiti, Himachal Pradesh, India

The Swangla is a tribal community found in Lahaul and Spiti district of Himachal Pradesh, India. They are primarily settled in the Pattan region of the Lahaul sub-division. As per Census of India, the population of Swangla Tribe stood at 9,630 (Males 4829 and females 4801).

== Social status ==
As of 2001, the Swangla were classified as a Scheduled Tribe under the Indian government's reservation program of positive discrimination.
