= Kareri Lake =

Lake in Kangra district, Himachal Pradesh, India

- Kumarwah Lake
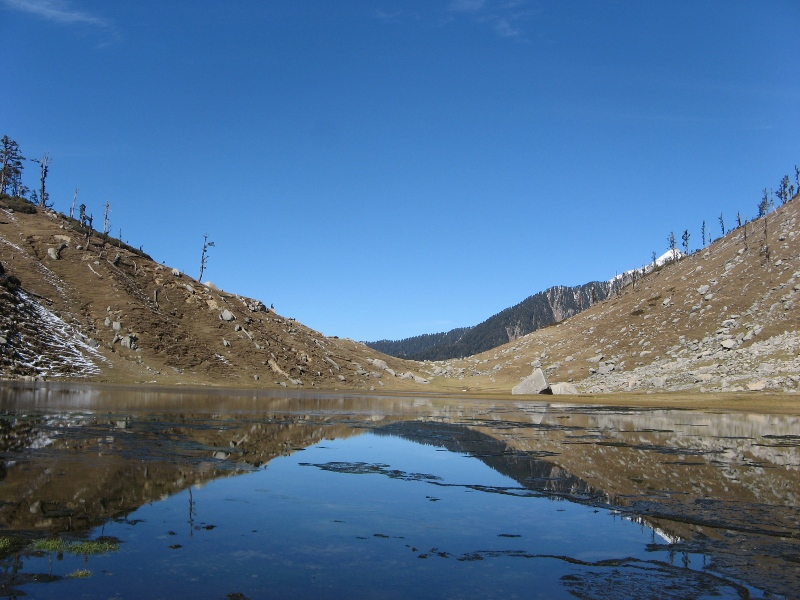
- Kareri Lake

- Location within Himachal Pradesh Location within India
- Location: Kangra district
- Coordinates: 32°19′32″N 76°16′25″E
- Lake type: High elevation lake
- Primary inflows: Mankiani Peak
- Primary outflows: Nyund Stream
- Basin countries: India
- Surface elevation: 2,934 m (9,626 ft)
- References: Himachal Pradesh Tourism Dep.

Kareri Lake is a shallow high elevation fresh water lake located on the southern spur of the Dhauladhar range approximately 9 km northwest of Dharamsala in Kangra district, Himachal Pradesh, India.

== Geography ==
Kareri Lake is at elevation 2,934 metres (9,626 ft) above the sea level. Snow melting from the Dhauladhar range serves as the source of the lake and a stream, Nyund is the outflow. Since the source is fresh melting snow and the lake is shallow, water visibility is very high and in most places, the lake bed can be seen. The lake remains frozen from early December to March–April. Kareri Lake water drains into Niyund stream, which later on drains into interconnected local water channels that subsequently drain into Maharana Pratap Sagar Reservoir situated on Pong Dam over the River Beas.

== Tourism ==
Kareri lake is best known for being a trekking destination in the Dhauladhars. Kareri Lake Trek is a 13 km moderate to tough trek covering 5 km forest area including mixed pine and broadleaf forests followed by grasslands interspersed with pine and deodar in the second half of the trail carved into granite rocks. There is a temple dedicated to Lord Shiva and Shakti on a hilltop overlooking the lake. A few Gaddi kothis are present on the other side of the lake, an area which is used by the gaddis as a grazing ground for their animals. Kareri Lake serves as a base for trekking further into the Dhauladhar and onward to Chamba and Bharmour via the Minkiani Pass (4250m) and Baleni Pass (3710m). It also acts as a base camp for the popular Seven Lake Trek to the seven high elevation lakes of Dhauladhar Ranges. Lam Dal Lake is also accessible from the Kareri through Mannkiani Pass.

== Etymology ==
Kareri Lake is named after the nearby Gaddi village of Kareri, situated 9 km south east of the lake. Kareri Lake is one of seven high elevation sacred lakes of Dhauladhar Ranges dedicated to the Hindu God Shiva. Other sacred lakes after Kareri are Nag Dal Lake, KaliKund Lake, Nag Chhatri Dal lake, Chandrakup Lake, Dam Ghodi Tal Lake and Lam Dal Lake.

== Seven Lake Trek ==
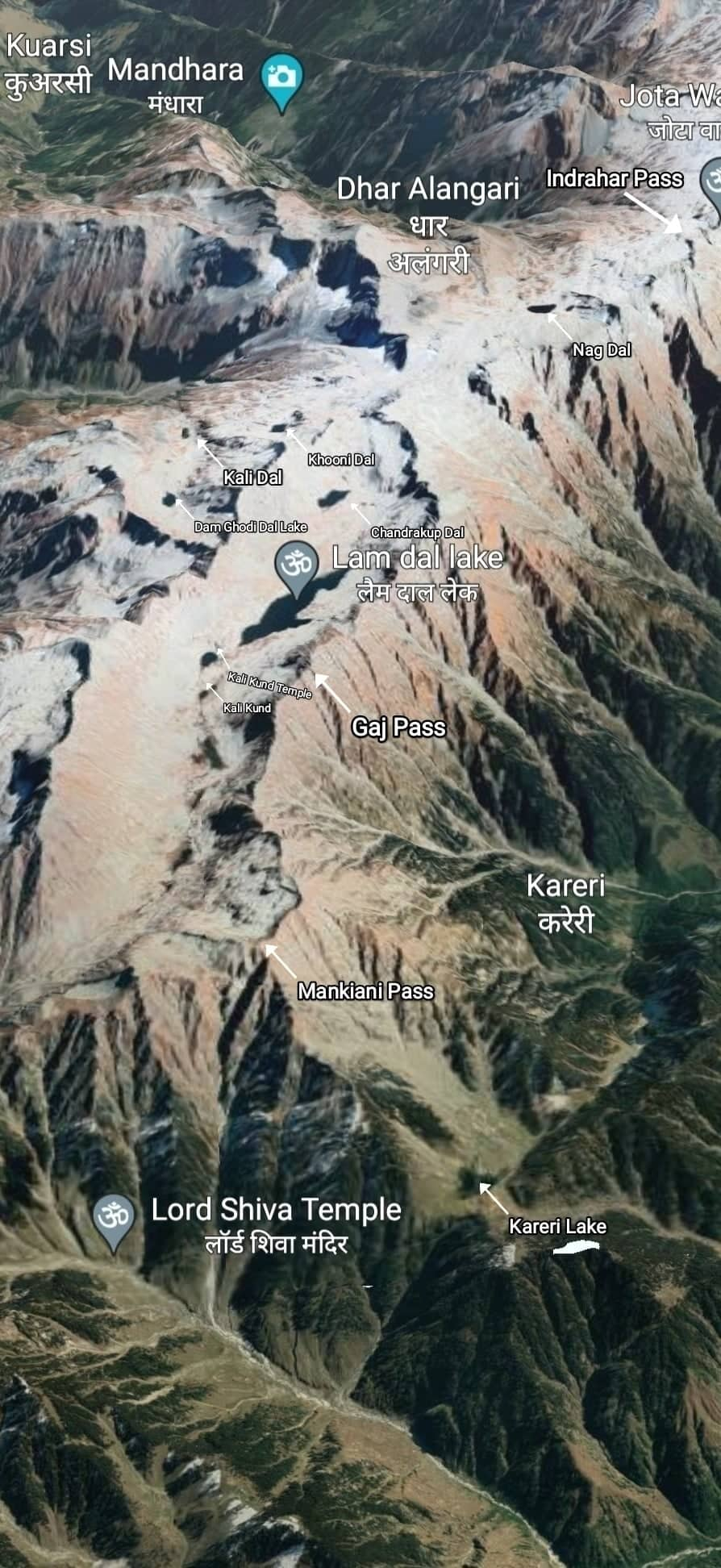
Kareri Lake serves as the base camp for all the seven sacred high elevation glacial lakes situated at the Dhauladhar Ranges.

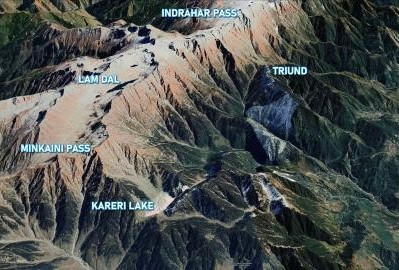
Route of the Seven Lake Trek including Kareri Lake acting as the first checkpoint and Triund as the last checkpoint (or vice versa).

Kareri Lake also serves as a base camp for the popular Seven Lake Trek of the Dhauladhar. Although there are more than 22 high elevation lakes in the Dhauladhar Ranges, seven among these are popular among trekkers in this region. All of the lakes are considered sacred and attributed to Lord Shiva. The Seven Lake Trek is a 5–7 day moderate-to-difficult level trek comprising trekking among the high elevation passes such as Indrahar Pass (4342m), Mankiani Pass (4250m) and Gaj Pass (4140m) and the seven high elevation glacial lakes of Dhauladhar, namely Nag Dal, Kali Kund/Kali Dal Lake, Nag Chhatri Lake, Chandrakup Lake, Dam Ghodi Tal Lake and Lam Dal with Kareri Lake acting as the base camp for the trek as well as the first point of the trek with Triund acting as its last checkpoint.

== Gallery ==
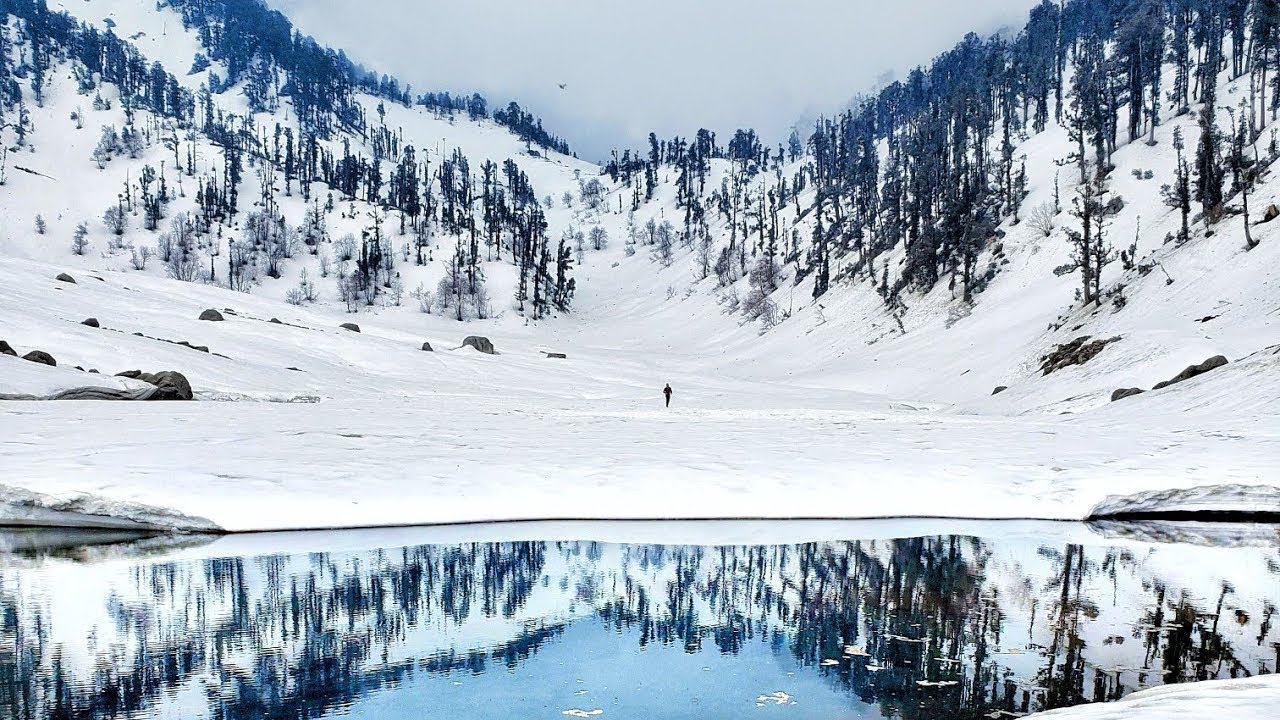
The Kareri Lake receives very high snowfall during winter

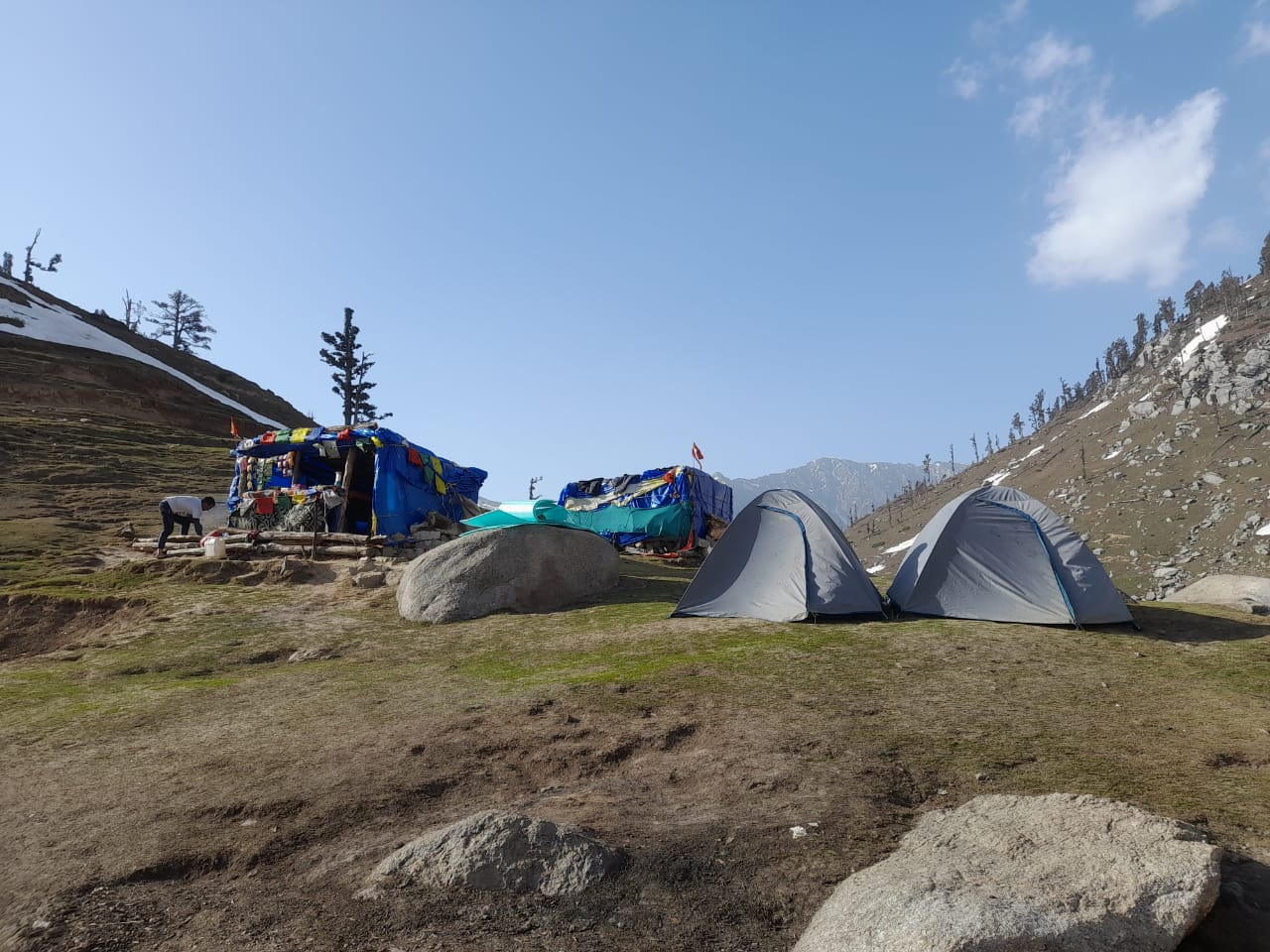
Camps at Kareri Lake

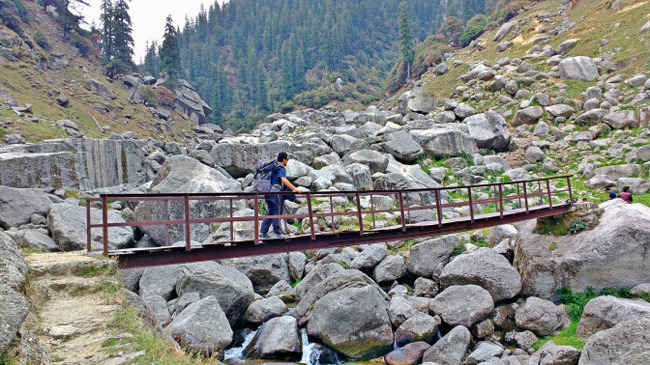
Reyoti Bridge acts as a mid point between the Kareri Village and Kareri Lake in the trek. Here the 5 km section of forest ends and 7 km mountainous terrain starts.

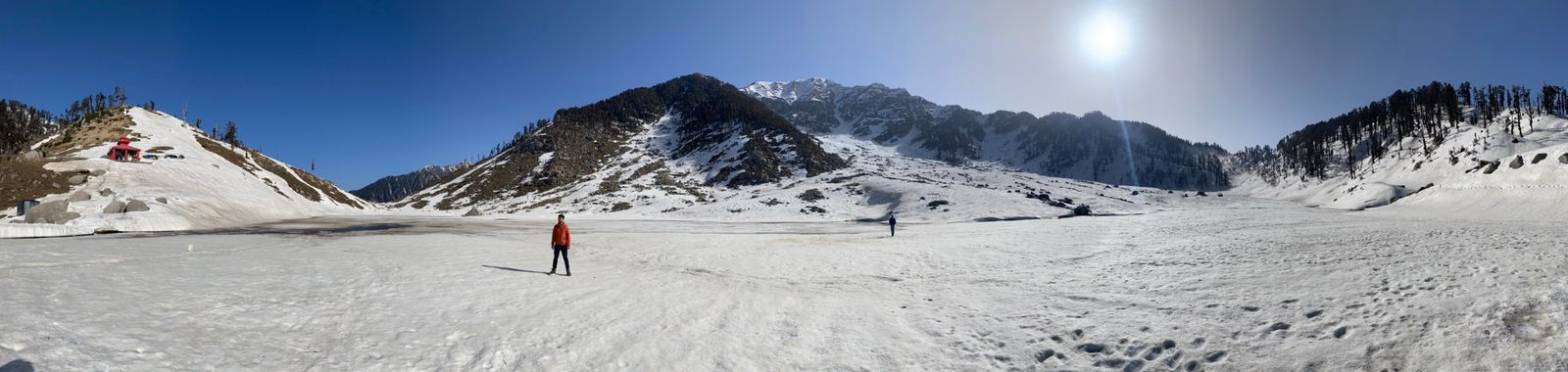
Frozen Kareri Lake: Kareri Lake freezes in winter at subzero temperatures

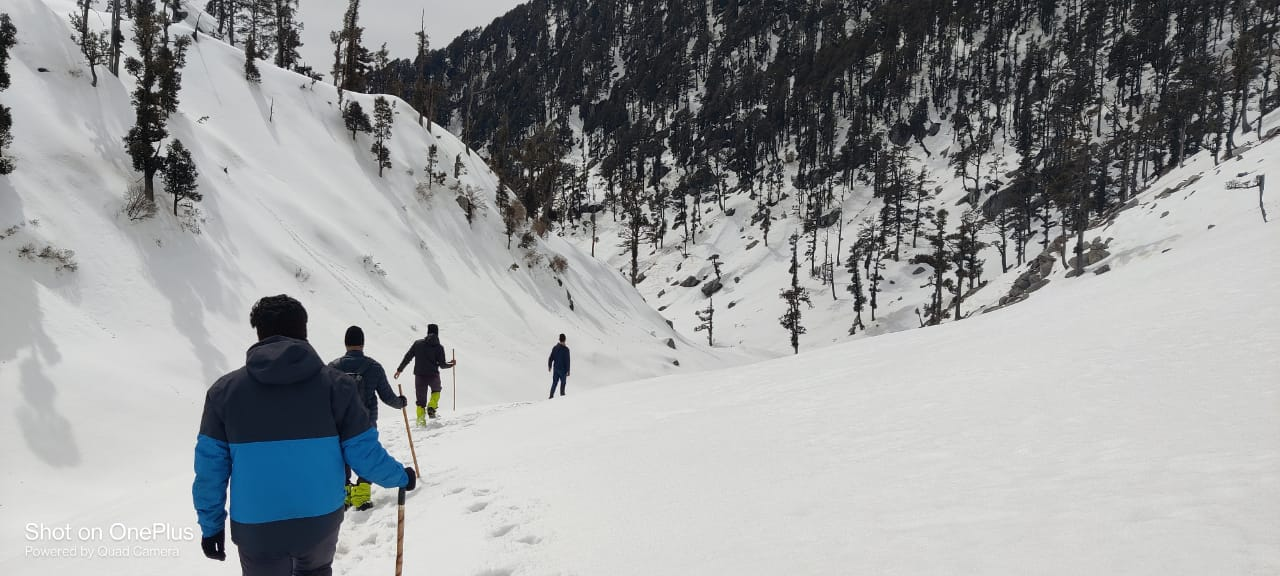
Winter trekking in Kareri

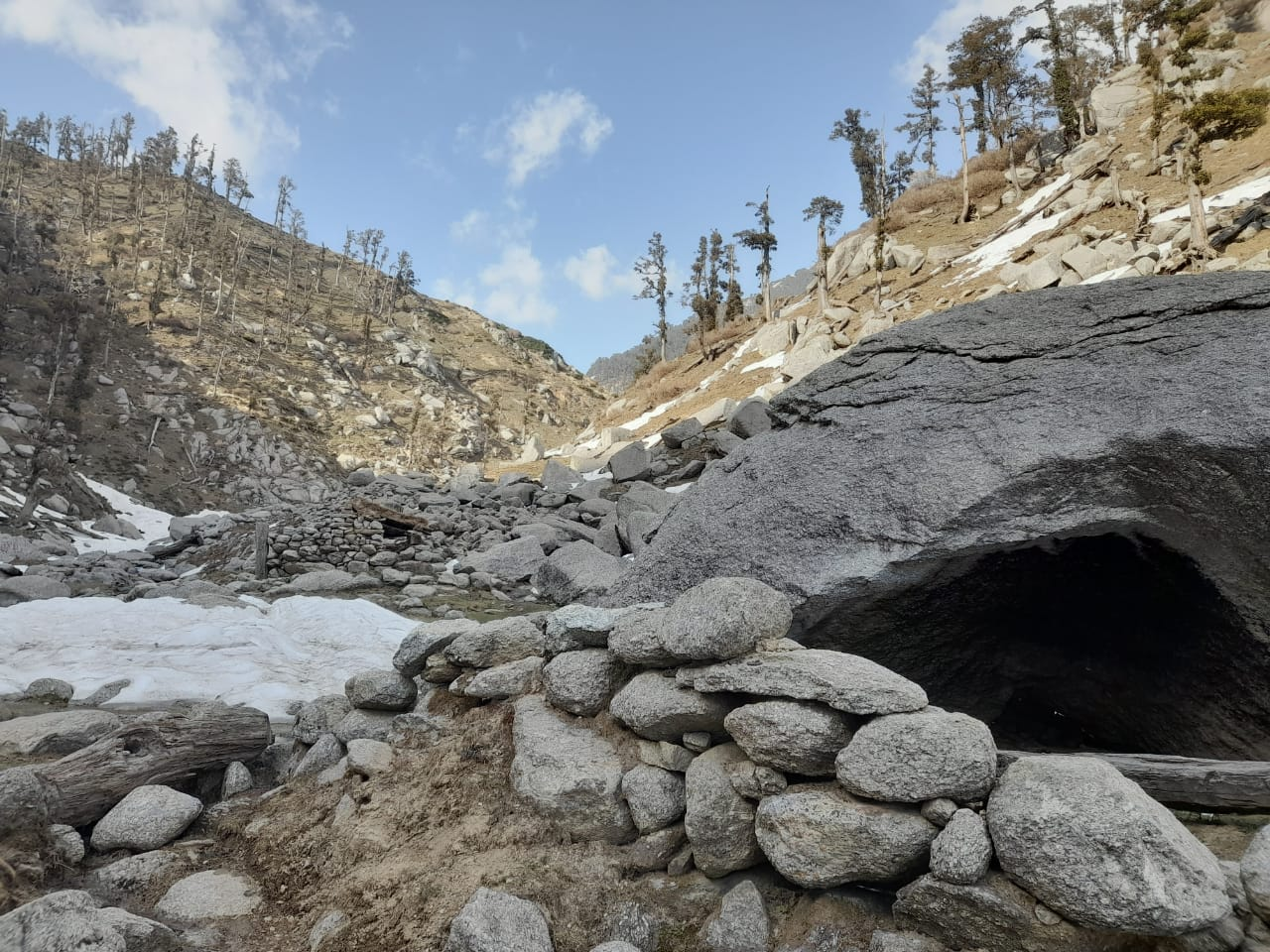
Gaddi Kothi near the lake: The Local Gaddi Tribe graze their cattle in the summer in the vicinity of Kareri and set up temporary shelter under rock caves. In the Winter they trek downhill.

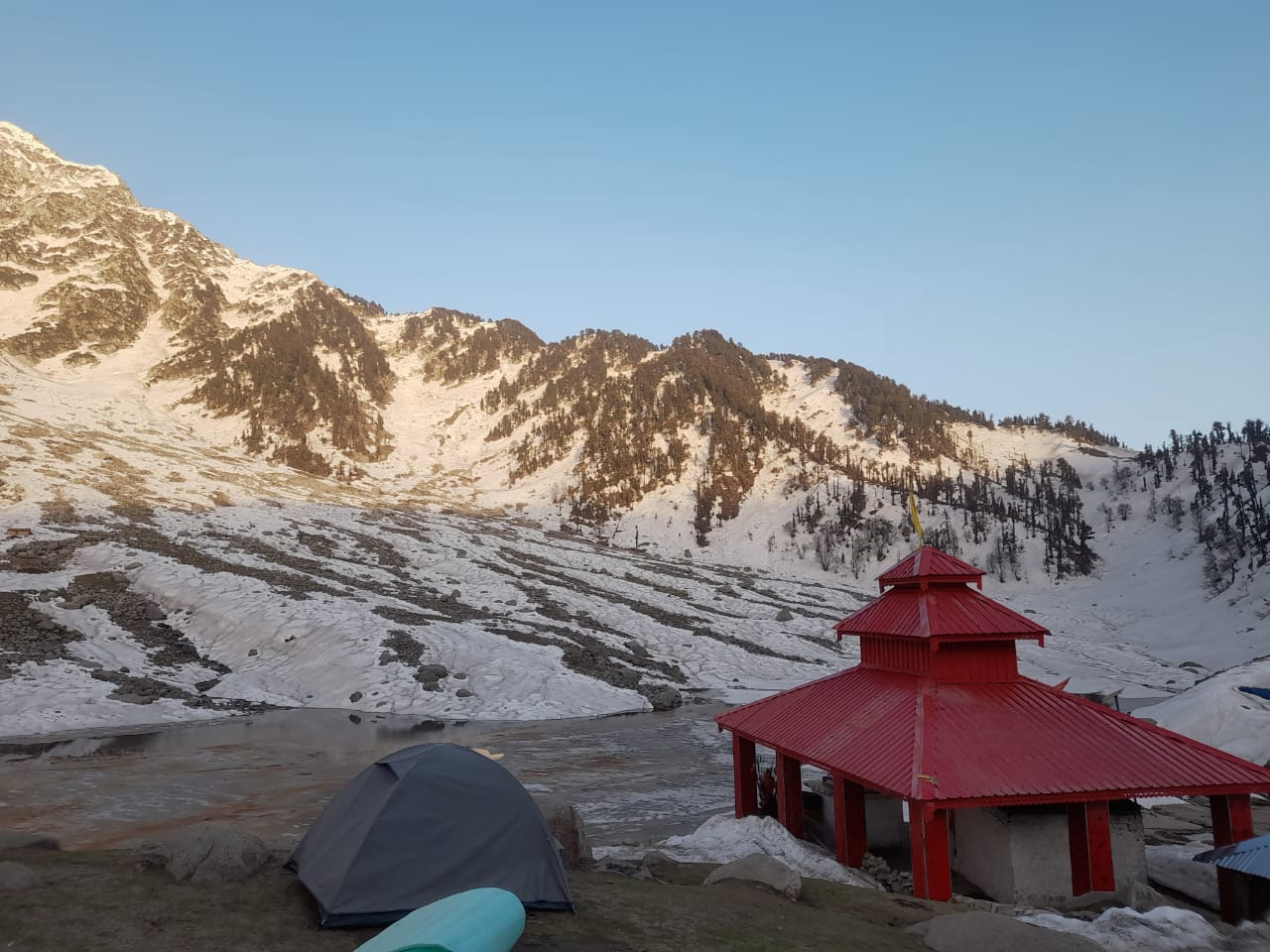
Shiva Mandir at Kareri Lake
