= Kuhl irrigation (Himachal Pradesh) =

Kuhls are traditional systems of community managed, interconnected gravity flow irrigation systems of Kangra Valley in the western Himachal Pradesh region of India.

The Kangra Valley is composed of forested alluvial plains sloping away from the base of the Dhauladhar mountain range falling largely within the sub districts of Kangra and Palampur. It is crisscrossed by small streams called nalas and perennial rivers fed by glacial melts called khad, that originate in the Dhauladhar and eventually join the Beas River. The Kuls of Spiti and Guls of Kashmir are similar water management systems, helping in proper water supply.

== History ==
The kulhs have a history that is 300 years old. They are believed to have started during the rule of the Katoch family who is said to have sponsored the largest kuhl systems. The names of these kuhls often find their origins in 'raja' (king) and 'rani' (queen) after the royalty who sponsored the construction of the kuhls. Since all communities benefited from the kuhls, its construction can be seen as an exercise to garner political power and acceptance.The kuhl management fell under the purview of a family appointed by the ruler, and was often a hereditary post. Upon this appointed Kohli falls the prime responsibility of managing the system of kuhls, ensuring that the distribution of water is fair and leading the maintenance of the kuhls....

Colonial rule saw support extended to the kuhls for economic reasons. This included generating revenues and averting famines. Baker in the opening of his book highlights how the British government was aware of the importance of the Kuhl system to the socio-economic fabric of the valley. The response of the British rulers to the earthquake of 1905 that happened preceding the rice planting season, illustrates the awareness of the government of the importance of the kuhl system to the socio-economic fabric of the valley. The earthquake resulted in the complete destruction of the irrigation canals. A troupe of soldiers in the military engineering units were mobilized immediately to work on the repair of the canal and a potential famine, from the failure of the paddy crop, was averted.

The British also codified the existing system and its customary laws in a document called the Riwaj-I-Abpashi which mentions the names, histories and locations of the kuhls, its water sharing rules, and the measures needed to be taken to resolve conflicts.

Post-independence saw a change in the system of kuhl management. There was a bureaucratization of the earlier system of hereditarily appointed kohlis. A new system of elected kuhl committees headed by a Kohli was put in place. These committees work in liaison with the government for tasks including managing the grants needed for the maintenance of kuhl and facilitating the relationship with the companies that built small hydro-power projects in the rivers of the valley. These committees are still exclusively organised by men as women have been traditionally excluded from any processes related to the kuhls.

The government also used a number of International Development Assistance programmes to bring in resources to maintain and change the nature of kuhals and their management. Since this was done through IPH department, which was primarily an irrigation assets construction and maintenance entity made of civil engineers, many of whom being local residents and knowing the history and customary kuhal management systems, assisted a process of centralised and bureaucratized version of kuhal management which further alienated this centuries old resilient and community driven water commons. The study of Lower Baijnath Kuhal (see reference documents), shows how this process unfolded and with what consequences.

== Functions ==
Irrigation is the primary function of the kuhls. As of 2002, it irrigated about 30,000 hectares of the valley. The Riwaj-I-Abpashi in 1918 notes that there were around 715 major and over 2500 minor kuhls in the valley. Unsurprisingly, the irrigation through the Kuhls along with rain patterns heavily affect the cropping patterns of Kangra. Dependence on the Kuhl waters peaks twice a year, right before the sowing of the kharif (summer) and rabi (winter) crops.

Water from the river is diverted through canals that are made out digging land and pitching stones. This rubble masonry is called Danga. Dangas are not permanent structures. This makes it easier to channel water for new and additional needs like someone starting to farm a new piece of land. Diversions are made of grass, stones or sticks. It keeps the cost of maintaining the system negligible. Intensive maintenance work on the Dangas happens during spring as the glacial melt and winter storms usually cause damage to the structures. Traditionally, under the leadership of the Kohli, the community comes together to repair it every year. This is called Khana.

Since these canals are unlined they also recharge underground water through the areas it flows through seepage. They also support the growth of riparian ecosystems along its course. The water from the Kuhls is also used to wash dishes, clothes and livestock and in instances when the tap water runs dry it is used for drinking purposes too. However, domestic dependence of the Kuhls have reduced considerably since the availability of tap water.

It also caters to other livelihoods to the communities and families that run the watermills (Gherats) and the shepherds (Gaddis). Since the water mills run without electric power and operate with the force of water, the community gets to grind grains at a really low cost. Systems of informality are prevalent here and often the Gherats are paid in grain when the families don't have money to pay for the services of the water mills .

== Present Day ==
Changes in the past few decades have posed a challenge to the functioning of the kuhls. This includes a sharp decline in dependence on agriculture and out-migration. This has resulted in the fall in available collective labor to perform annual maintenance tasks and the general interest in the maintenance of the kuhls.

In the recent years, the government has started to manage these structures and construct them out of concrete. Apart from making the repairs to damages costlier and unaffordable to the people of the valley, it has made it difficult to divert the canal according to changing needs. The cementing on the kuhl is executed through MNREGA program. The villagers participate in this for the wages, despite being in disagreement with the cementing of the kuhls. In many villages, the Department of Irrigation and Public manages the kulhs. All of these changes can be seen as a complete perversion of the earlier systems of management and community ownership that surrounded the kuhl.

509 Small Hydro Electric Projects (up to 5 MW capacity) with an aggregate capacity of 1299 MW have been allotted in Himachal Pradesh till March 2011. These proposed projects that are now in various stages of development in most river systems of Himachal Pradesh are affecting the river basins and the communities dependent on it. Studies have shown that the new projects are affecting kuhls of the Kangra Valley too. It has been noted that there has been significant decline in the flow of water and soil moisture which has affected the remaining agricultural fields of the valley. Kuhls are now seen to be running dry, when the water is stored in the weir and flooded, when the water is released when generating hydro-power

== Kuhls as Commons ==
The persistence of the kuhl regime while many other community managed irrigation systems in India have collapsed under socio-economic changes, destroyed under environmental disturbances or been privatized, is a rich field in understanding theories including commons management

The organisation of the kuhl system and its management can be understood using Elinor Ostrom’s concept of self organizing system of a common-pool resource (CPRs). Ostrom’s work is posited against Garret Hardin’s ‘tragedy of the commons’ which argues that individuals are rational economic actors whose actions propelled by their self interest can inflict damage and deteriorate the common good. Hardin ignores that these commons are situated within communities where access and management of it are negotiated.

Ostrom elaborates 8 design principles for self governing institutions that manage resources. It highlights the importance of the need for the institution to be fair, flexible and accountable. The functioning of the kuhls resonate with this theory of self-organizing systems.

But it needs to be highlighted that these systems often operate outside of rational incentives. They are sites where prestige, power and memory are played out. Additionally conceptions of state and market and the role that they play in facilitating/ hindering the persistence of a CPR also need to be understood
