= Bhagsu =

- Village
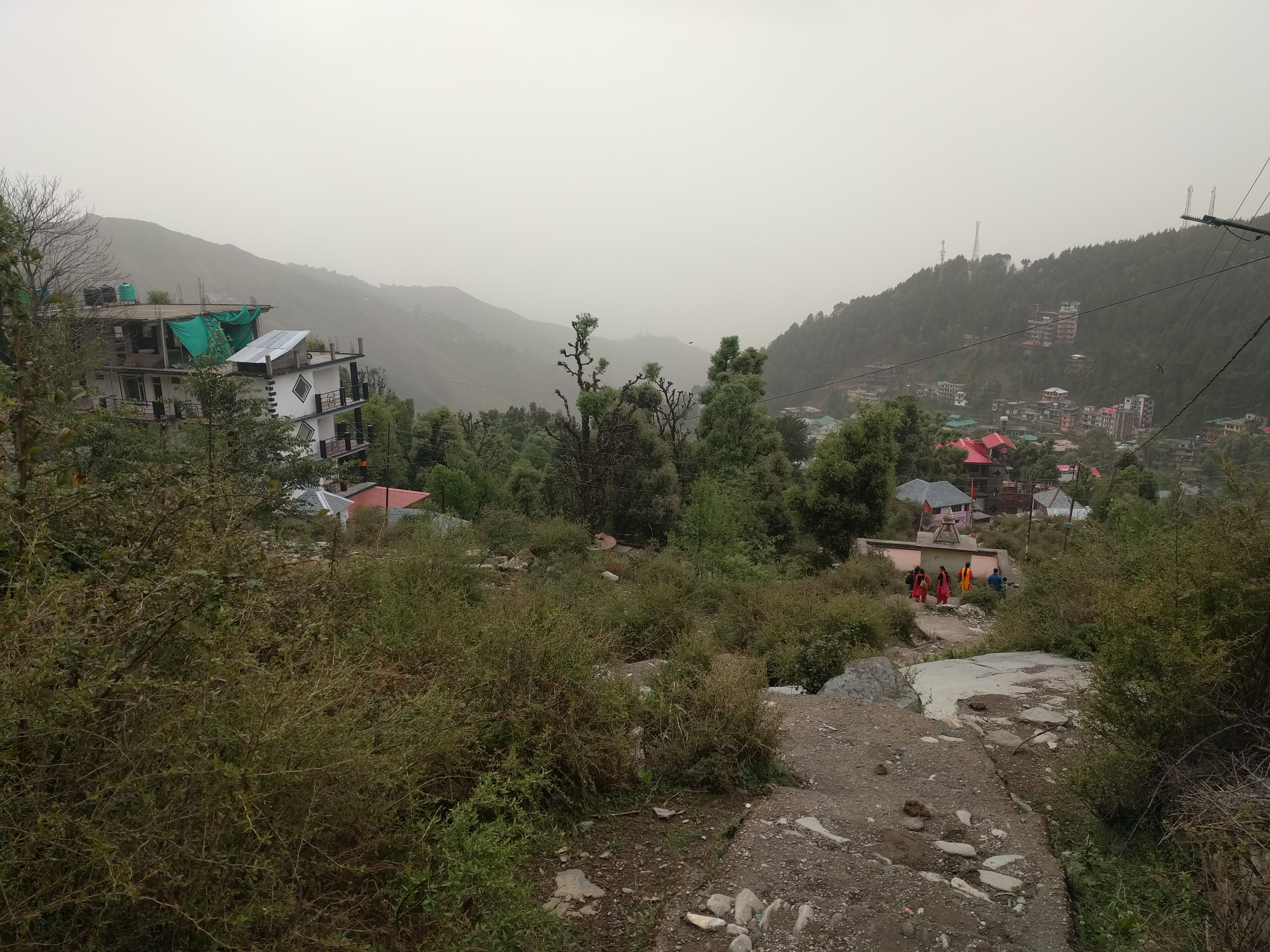
- Interactive map of Bhagsu
- Country: India
- State: Himachal Pradesh
- District: Kangra
- Mandal: Dharamshala
- Time zone: UTC+5:30 (IST)

Bhagsu/Bhaksu (also known as Bhagsunag or Bhagsunath) is a village near McLeod Ganj in Dharamshala, in the Kangra district of Himachal Pradesh, India. The village is the site of Bhagsunag waterfall and the ancient Bhagsunag Temple.

In the early 18th century, the Gorkhas came to Bhagsu with the British to settle, and they formed the 1st Gorkha Rifles in 1815. Bhagsu is named after the Bhagsunag temple currently in McLeod Ganj station.

== History ==
In Indian mythology, the snake god, Nagdevata, got into a battle with King Bhagsu, who had stolen water from the sacred NagDal Lake. King Bhagsu was defeated and eventually forgiven, and the site was consecrated as Bhagsu Nag.

== Legend ==
Bhagsunag is a very ancient place of Shiva. Its story has been narrated in ancient texts as follows. In the middle period of Dwapar Yuga, the capital of the demon king Bhagsu was in Ajmer country. It is said that once there was a terrible drought in the state of King Bhagsu due to a lack of rain for a long time. The people were in distress, so they requested King Bhagsu to immediately arrange for water from somewhere. If this could not be done, then they said they would leave this place and go somewhere else. The protector of the people, King Bhagsu, assured everyone to stay there, and while searching for water, they reached this state of the snakes. At a Dhauladhar mountain peak, 18,000 feet (5.49 km) high, King Bhagsu saw a lake flowing, known as Nagdal. The illusionist Bhagsu filled the water of the secluded lake in a water pot by his magic and returned. When the snakes saw that their lake was empty, they searched for Bhagsu. Then, at the village, a fierce battle took place between the snakes and Bhagsu. In that battle, the water of the water pot fell, and since then, water has been flowing continuously in the form of streams. The snakes defeated Bhagsu in the battle. He understood that the snake is also a form of Lord Shankar, or Shiva. Accepting his defeat, Bhagsu told Nagdev Shankar that his death is the punishment for stealing the water. Bhagsu asked for forgiveness, and Nagdev Shankar became calm and wanted to know about his wish. Asurraj Bhagsu said that if Shiva is kind to him, then my last wish is that water reaches Bhagsu's kingdom so that the people there can be protected, and he has been liberated by his hands. Saying this, Bhagsu gave up his life. After this, Nagdev rained in his kingdom and made many sources of water flow. Then, adding his name to his name gave him immortality forever. Nagdev appeared here in the form of his beloved Shiva. His self-manifested linga was situated in this temple by the name of Bhageshwar. Swayambhu means one who has appeared by himself. Later, Lord Bhageshwar informed the king of this place, Dharamchand, about his presence here in his dream. This city is named Dharamshala after the name of King Dharamchand. Dharmkot village is also present at some distance from Bhagsunag in the name of Raja Dharm Chand, and Dharm Chand built a temple here and established Bhageshwar properly.

== Tourism ==
There are a number of hotels in Bhagsu. Tourist attractions include Bhagsu Waterfall, the Triund Trek, and Dharamkot.
