= Dharamsala Days, Dharamsala Nights =

Non-Fiction Book

Dharamsala Days, Dharamsala Nights by Pauline Macdonald is a non-fiction work set in Mcloed Ganj, India, in a Tibetan refugee camp. The book depicts the life Tibetan new arrivals experience in India.
