= Hanuman Tibba =

Mountain peak in Himachal Pradesh, India

Coordinates: 32.336°N 77.051°E

Hanuman Tibba is the highest mountain peak in Kangra district and lies on Dhauladhar Range in Himachal Pradesh, India, with an altitude of 5,982 metres (19,626 ft) above sea level. It lies to the Northwest of Manali and to the East of Solang. To the north of Hanuman Tibba, lies the Taintuka Pass and to the south lies Manali Pass. These Passes form the district boundary between the Kangra District and Kullu District. It is a well known local peak, partly due to it resembling a steep pyramid, with its noted feature of steep vertical rise from its base camp site. Its west face has been a recent site to many attempts to climb through the “west spur”, a steep, technical, sustained rocky feature often exposed to winds and gnarly ice flutings. The Diretissima through this face and the north face- overall, is still unclimbed. In a noted recent attempt by the Alpine Club of the Greater Himalayas, 4 alpinists tried climbing through this very spur, but were defeated by rotten ice conditions, high at 5,720 m (18,770 ft).

Some controversy initially surrounded Werner Merkel Roth and fellow members (Mr.A.Azer Mr. Mir. H) reports of climbing an approximately 58-metre rock shelf (VI+) at nearly 5,500 m (18,000 ft), a claim which was later to be accepted when an Austrian climbing party reported and verified the same.
