= Indrahar Pass =

Mountain pass in the Himalayas

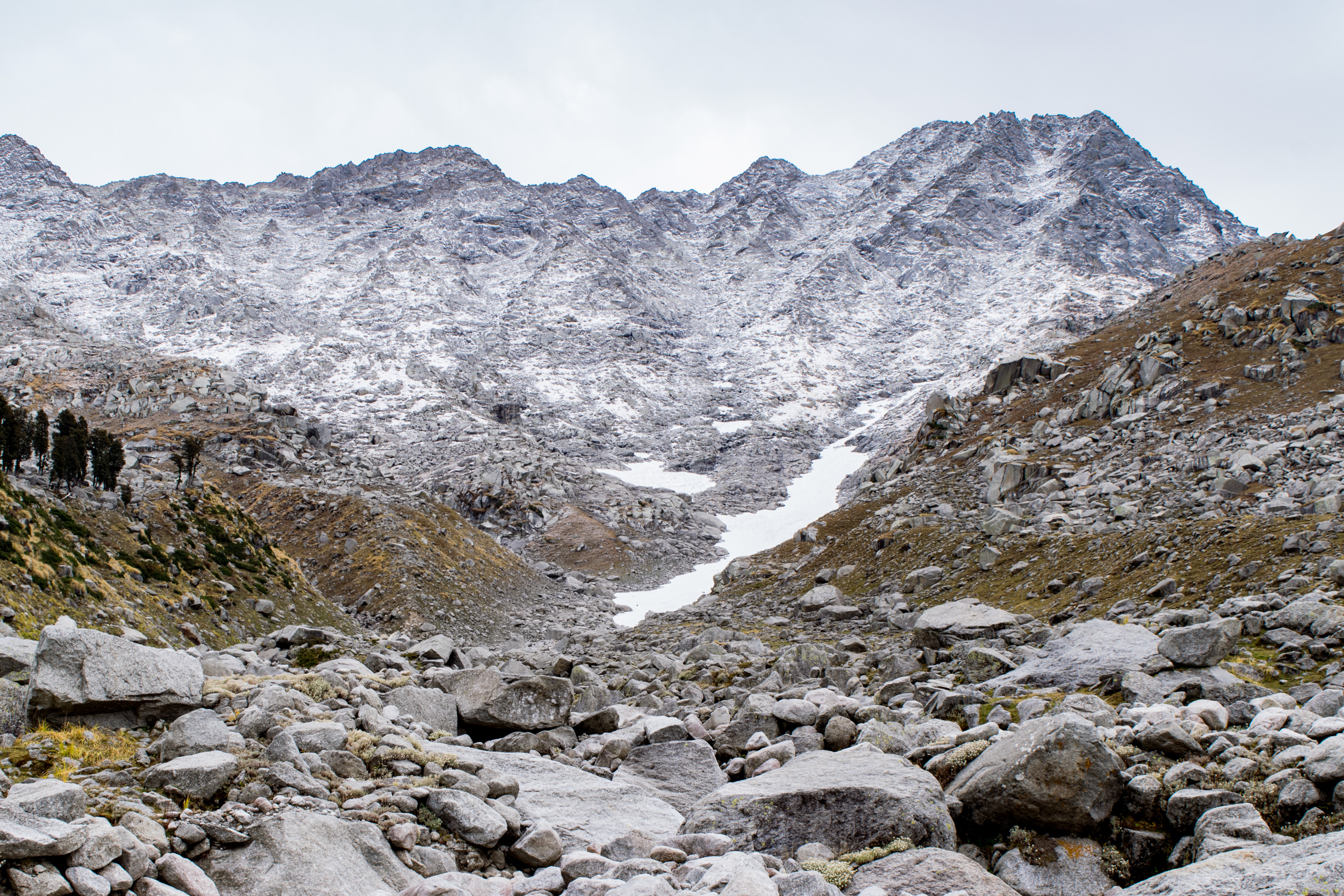
Indrahar Pass, as seen from a lower elevation.

Indrahar (इन्द्रहार) Pass is a mountain pass in the Dhauladhar range of the Himalayas. Located at 32°17.852′N 76°22.872′E and an altitude of 4,342 metres (14,245 ft) above mean sea level, near the tourist town of Dharamshala in Himachal Pradesh, Indrahar pass forms the border between Kangra and Chamba districts. It is part of a very popular trekking route from Dharamshala. It attracts substantial tourist traffic during the trekking season between April – October.

== Indrahar Pass Trail ==
The trekking trail to Indrahar pass starts from Galu Devi temple above Dharamkot village near Dharamsala and passes through the camping ground of Triund, Ilaqua/Laka Got, and Lahesh Caves. On the other side of the pass, the camping sites include Chhata caves at 3242 metres and Kuarsi village in Chamba at 2,260 metres.

The trek starts from McLeod Ganj and continues as follows:

- McLeod Ganj main market (1750m) to Galu Devi temple at Upper Dharamkot (2100m) | 2 km | 1-2 hour walk OR a 45-minute cab ride
- Galu Devi temple (2100m) to Triund (2825m) | 2-3.5 hrs walk (mix of easy and uphill)
- Triund (2825m) to Snowline Cafe | 1-2 hour uphill walk
- Snowline Cafe to Ilaqua Got (grazing grounds) | 1 hour easy walk (mostly flat/downhill)
- Ilaqua to Lahesh cave (3300 m) 2-3 hours.
- Lahesh Cave to Indrahar Pass (4300m) | 2–6 hours of a steep climb

== See also ==
- List of mountain passes of India
