= Kuarsi, India =

Village in district Chamba of Himachal Pradesh, India

Kuarsi
- Village
- Location in Himachal Pradesh, India Kuarsi (Himachal Pradesh)
- Coordinates: 32.367°N 76.450°E
- Country: India
- State: Himachal Pradesh
- District: Chamba district

Area
  - Total: 343 ha (850 acres)
- Elevation: 2,260 m (7,410 ft)

Population (2011)
  - Total: 192

Languages
  - Official: Hindi
- Time zone: UTC+5:30 (IST)

Kuarsi is a village and municipality located in Himachal Pradesh, India.

It is located approximately 683 km (424 mi) from New Delhi. It is situated approximately 10.6 km (6.6 mi) away from the peak of Dhauladhar. Other surrounding towns in the area include: Lamu, Dharamshala, and Chhatrari. Kuarsi is administrated by a Sarpanch, who is the elected representative of the village.
