= Kangra Valley =

River valley in Himachal Pradesh, India

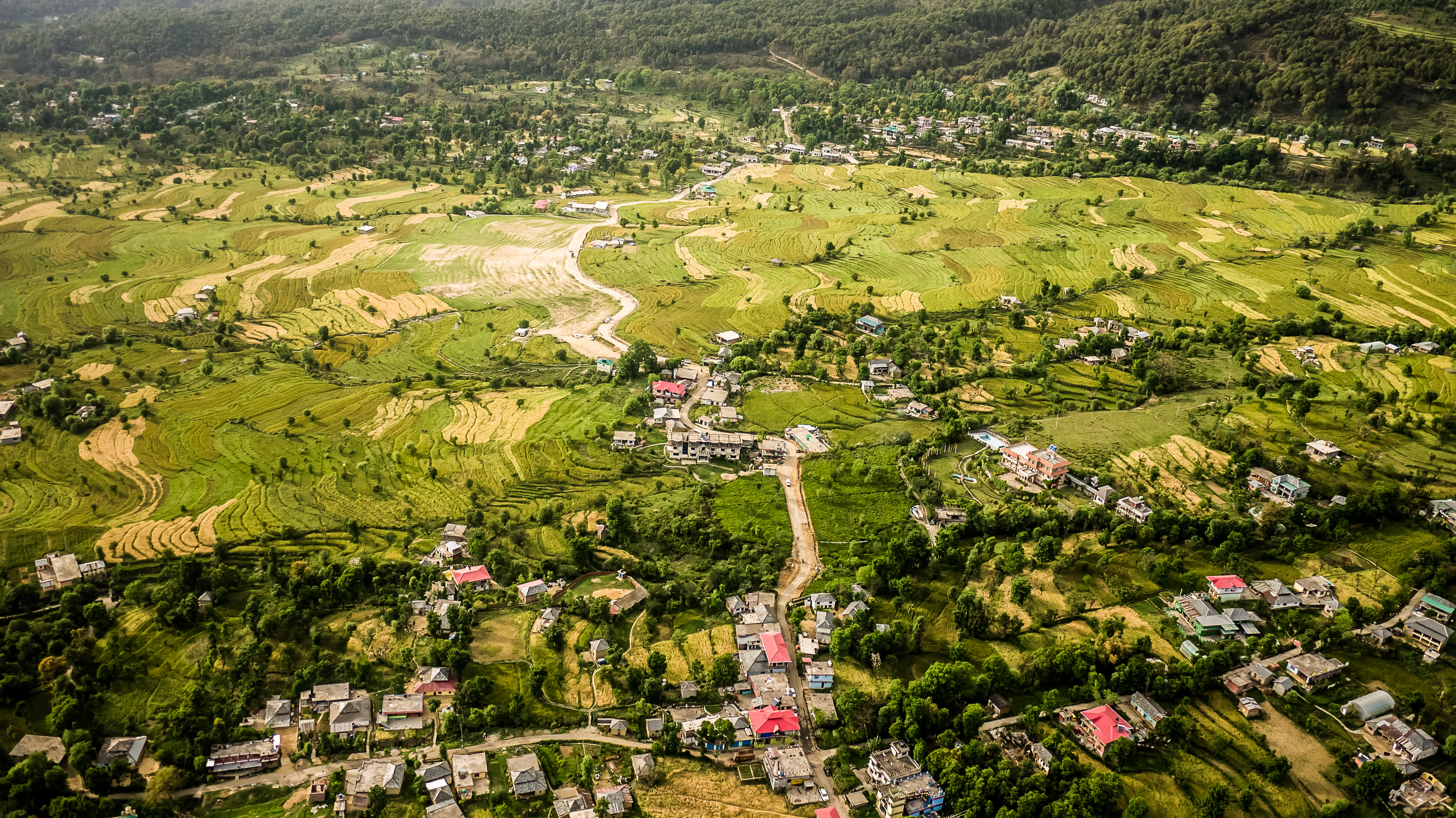
- An aerial view of Bir in Kangra valley
- Floor elevation: 2,000 ft (610 m)

Geology
- Type: River Valley

Geography
- Location: Himachal Pradesh, India
- Population centers: Baijnath, Dharamshala, Kangra, McLeodGanj, Palampur, Bhawarna, Sidhbari
- Coordinates: 32°05′11″N 76°15′12″E
- Rivers: Beas River
- Interactive map of Kangra Valley

Kangra Valley is a river valley situated in the Western Himalayas. It lies in the state of Himachal Pradesh in India, and is a popular tourist destination. The Kangri language is spoken there. Dharamshala, the headquarters of Kangra district and the main city of the valley, lies on the southern spur (lateral ridge) of Dhauladhar.

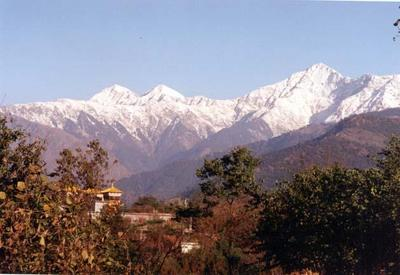
Dhauladhar range of the Himalayas from Kangra Valley

== History ==
Kangra was for centuries an independent kingdom, ruled by the Katoch dynasty. Its king, Sansar Chand sought assistance of Sikh maharaja of Punjab, Ranjit Singh, in 1808 against the expanding Gorkha kingdom. The Nepal–Sikh war brought Kangra Valley under the Sikh suzerainty, later being annexed by Ranjit Singh in 1828. After 1846, it was annexed by the British from the Sikh Empire and Kangra became a district of Punjab Province. The valley witnessed a devastating 7.8 magnitude earthquake at 6:19 am on 4 April 1905, as a result of which about 19,800 people were killed and thousands were injured in the Kangra area. Most buildings in towns of Kangra, Mcleodganj and Dharamshala were destroyed. the Tedha Mandir, in Jawalamukhi is also a victim of Earthquake 1905.

== Geography ==
The valley is filled with numerous perennial streams, which irrigate the valley, and the river Beas flows through this valley. The valley has an average elevation of 2000 ft. Kangra Valley is a strike valley and extends from the foot of the Dhauladhar range to the south of river Beas. The highest peak on the Dhauladhar, White Mountain, marks the boundary between the valley and Chamba, and reaches 15,956 ft (4,863 m). The peaks of the range are approximately 13,000 ft (4,000 m) above the valley floor, rising sharply from its base with no low hills in between.

=== Climate ===
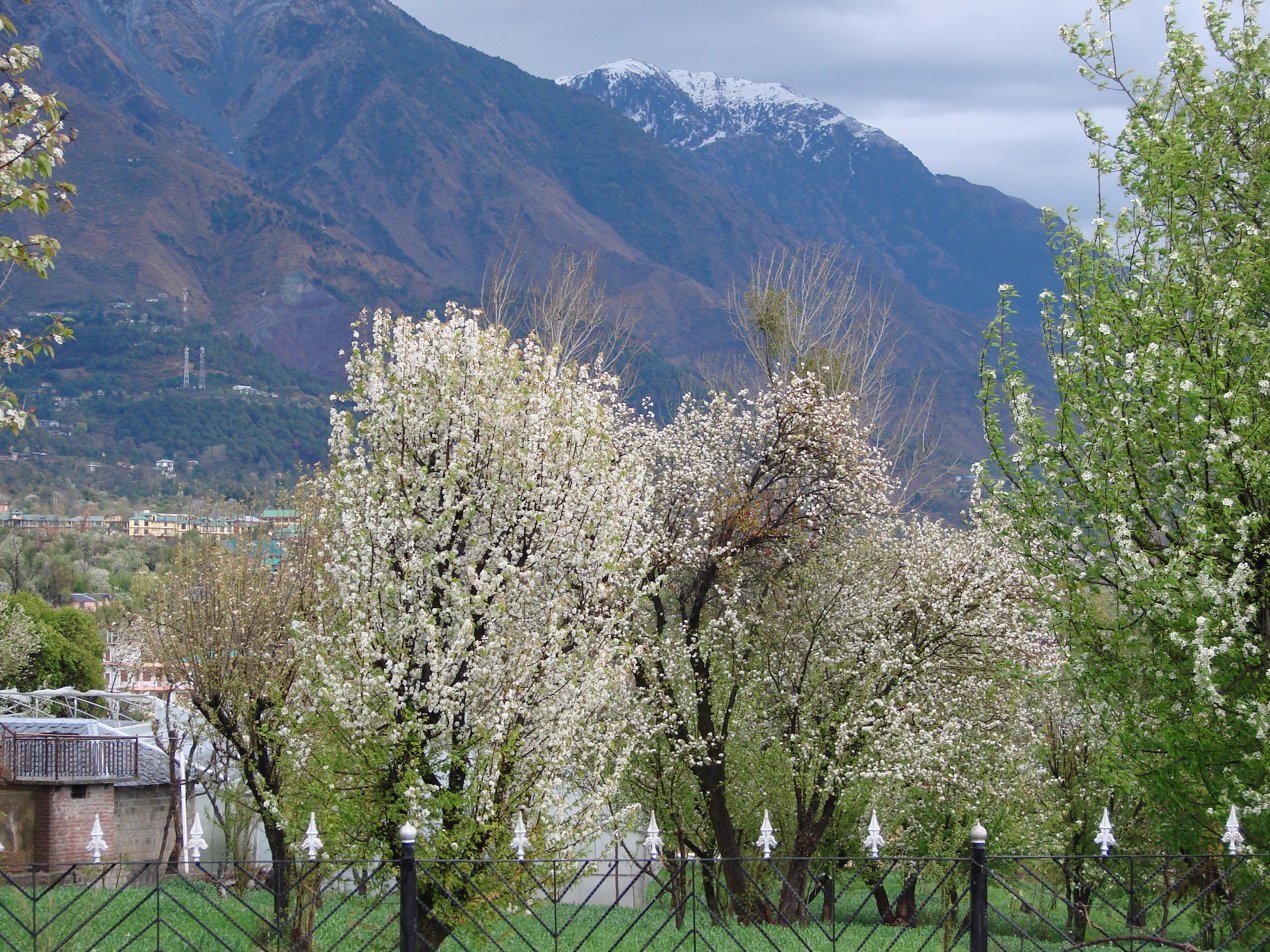
Spring in Kangra valley

Most of the valley has a humid subtropical climate (Cwa). Summer starts in early April and peaks in May. From June to mid-September is the monsoon season, when the valley receives very high amounts of rainfall. Autumn is mild and lasts from October to the end of November. Winters are cold and last till late February. Snowfall is common in the hills and higher reaches of the valley during this time. Snow in the lower elevations of the valley is rare, but has been recorded occasionally. Western disturbances cause winter precipitation. Winters are followed by a short, pleasant spring.

Climate data for Dharamshala (1991–2020 normals, extremes 1951–present)
Month	Jan	Feb	Mar	Apr	May	Jun	Jul	Aug	Sep	Oct	Nov	Dec	Year
Record high °C (°F)	24.7 (76.5)	28.0 (82.4)	33.4 (92.1)	36.2 (97.2)	38.6 (101.5)	38.6 (101.5)	42.7 (108.9)	37.8 (100.0)	34.8 (94.6)	34.6 (94.3)	28.6 (83.5)	27.2 (81.0)	42.7 (108.9)
Mean daily maximum °C (°F)	16.0 (60.8)	17.8 (64.0)	22.5 (72.5)	26.9 (80.4)	30.8 (87.4)	30.9 (87.6)	27.5 (81.5)	26.6 (79.9)	26.8 (80.2)	25.6 (78.1)	22.0 (71.6)	18.4 (65.1)	24.4 (75.9)
Mean daily minimum °C (°F)	5.9 (42.6)	7.3 (45.1)	10.7 (51.3)	14.8 (58.6)	19.0 (66.2)	20.5 (68.9)	19.7 (67.5)	19.2 (66.6)	17.8 (64.0)	14.2 (57.6)	10.2 (50.4)	7.1 (44.8)	13.9 (57.0)
Record low °C (°F)	−1.9 (28.6)	−1.6 (29.1)	2.4 (36.3)	7.3 (45.1)	8.4 (47.1)	12.6 (54.7)	14.3 (57.7)	14.1 (57.4)	11.2 (52.2)	8.0 (46.4)	4.8 (40.6)	−1.0 (30.2)	−1.9 (28.6)
Average rainfall mm (inches)	83.6 (3.29)	128.3 (5.05)	111.3 (4.38)	65.7 (2.59)	72.4 (2.85)	279.0 (10.98)	859.0 (33.82)	942.3 (37.10)	377.7 (14.87)	52.6 (2.07)	18.8 (0.74)	36.6 (1.44)	3,027.3 (119.19)
Average rainy days	4.5	6.2	6.1	5.1	4.8	10.7	22.0	23.0	13.9	2.6	1.2	2.2	102.3
Average relative humidity (%) (at 17:30 IST)	67	67	58	55	50	59	81	85	78	65	64	66	66
Source: India Meteorological Department

== Language ==
A distinct regional dialect of Punjabi named Kangri is spoken in Kangra valley.

== Important towns ==
- Baijnath
- Dharamshala
- Kangra
- Palampur
- Nagrota Bagwan
- Yol

== Transport ==
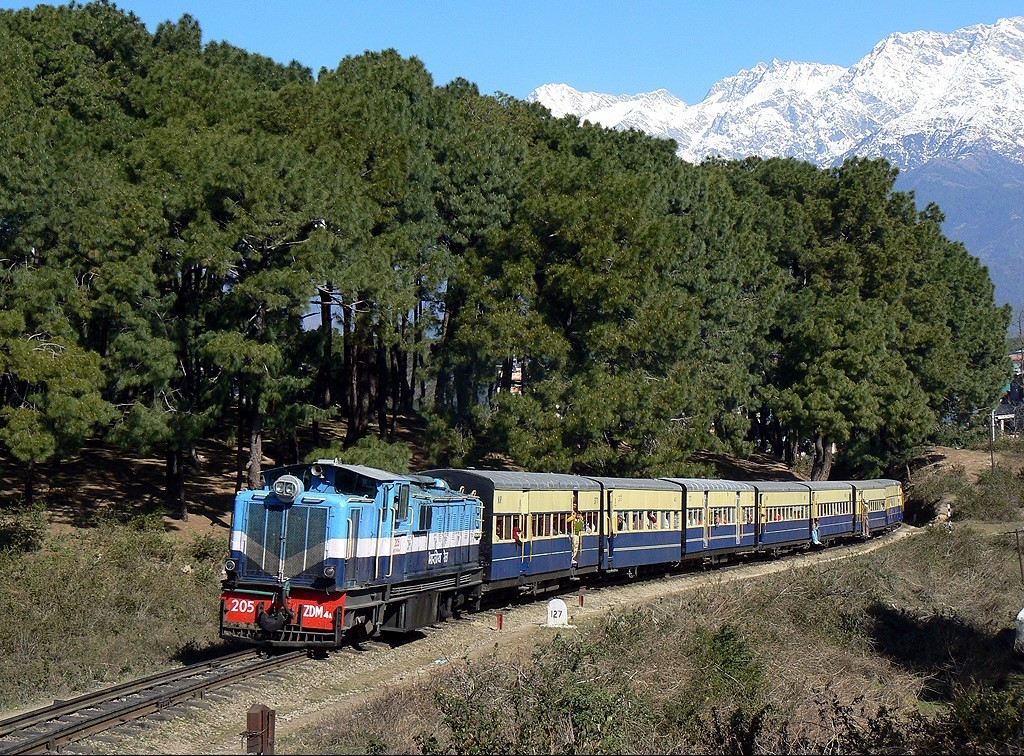
A train in the Kangra valley

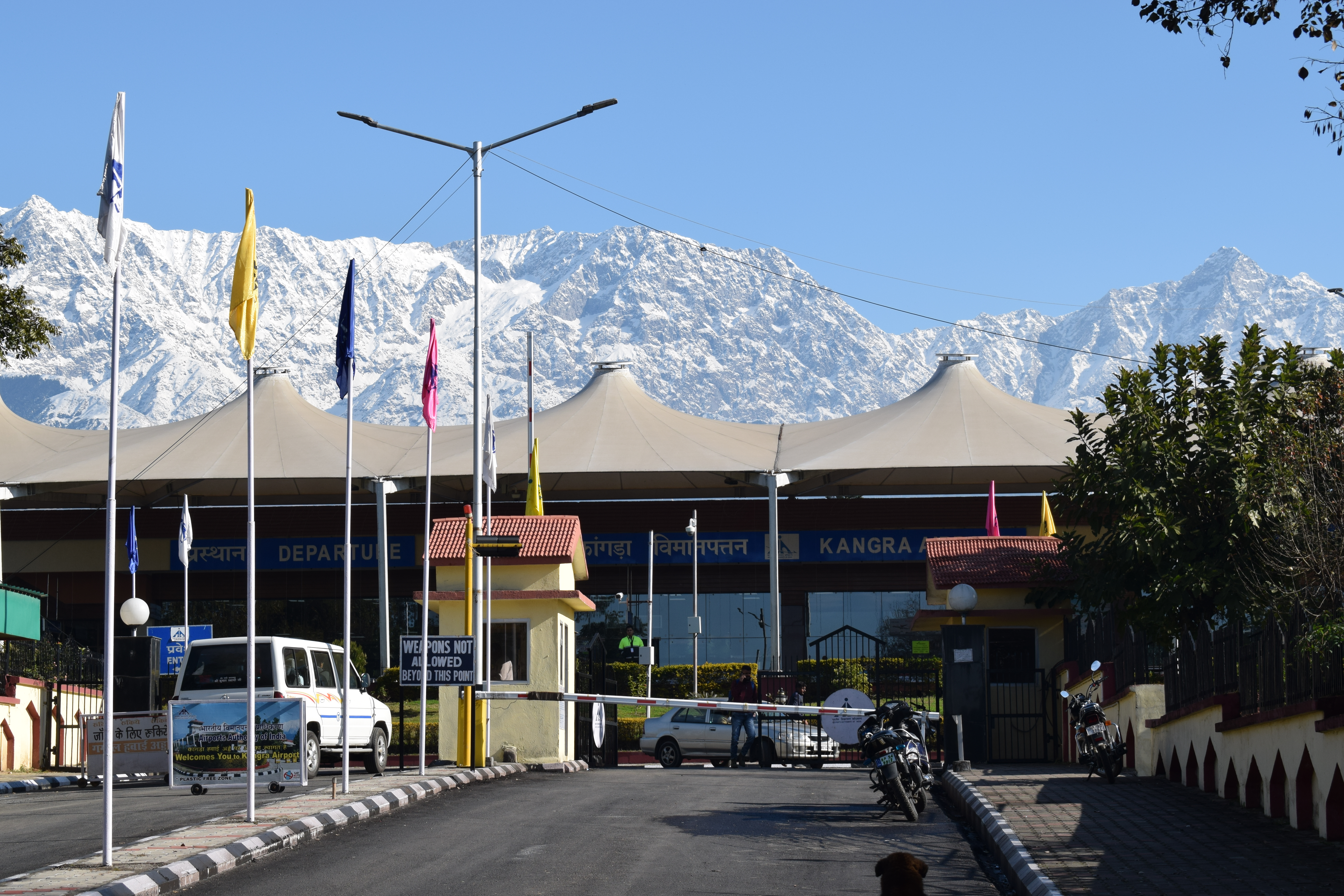
Gaggal Airport

=== Road ===
National highways 154 and 503 are the national highways that pass through the valley, connecting it with other parts of Himachal Pradesh and the neighbouring state of Punjab. Several state highways also connect the valley.

=== Railway ===
Kangra Valley Railway is a 164 km long narrow gauge railway line that connects the valley with Pathankot, the nearest railhead on 5 ft 6 in (1,676 mm) broad gauge railway network.

=== Airport ===
Gaggal Airport, alternatively known as Kangra Airport or Dharamsala-Kangra Airport, is an airport located at Gaggal in Kangra Valley. It is located 14 km southwest of Dharamshala.

== Tourism ==
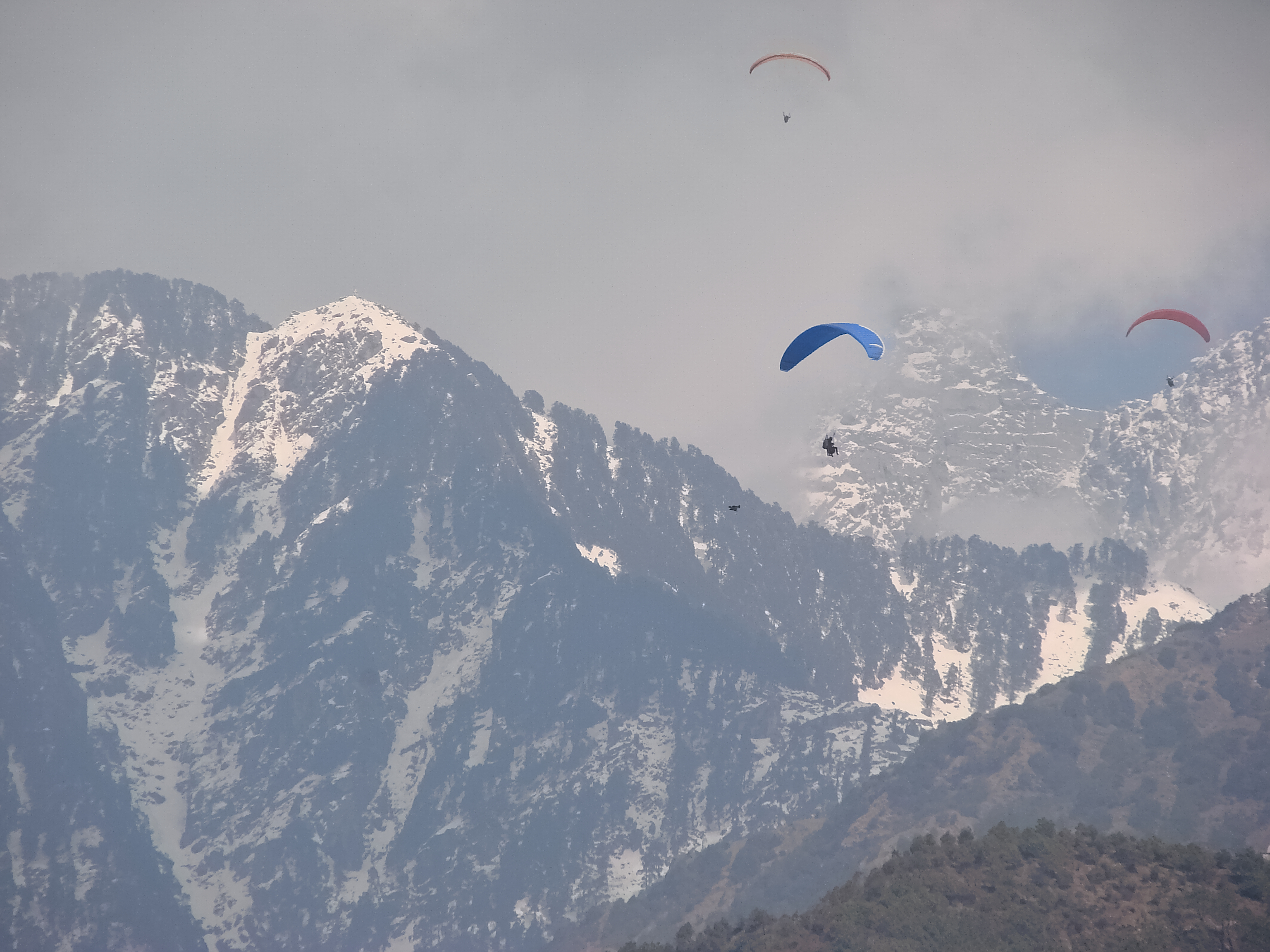
Paragliding in Bir

The main town in the valley and the capital of the district, Dharamshala, is one of the most visited hill stations in Himachal Pradesh and India. It also acts as a base for several Himalayan treks in the Dhauladhars, including Triund which is one of the most famous treks in India. Mcleodganj is the current residence of the Dalai Lama and the centre of Tibetan community in exile in India, and draws tourists from all over the world. Palampur and Dharamshala are also famous for their tea gardens where Kangra tea is grown. Bir is well known for adventure sports, particularly paragliding.
