= Lama Dal =

Lake in Himachal Pradesh, India

Lam Dal
- Laam Dal
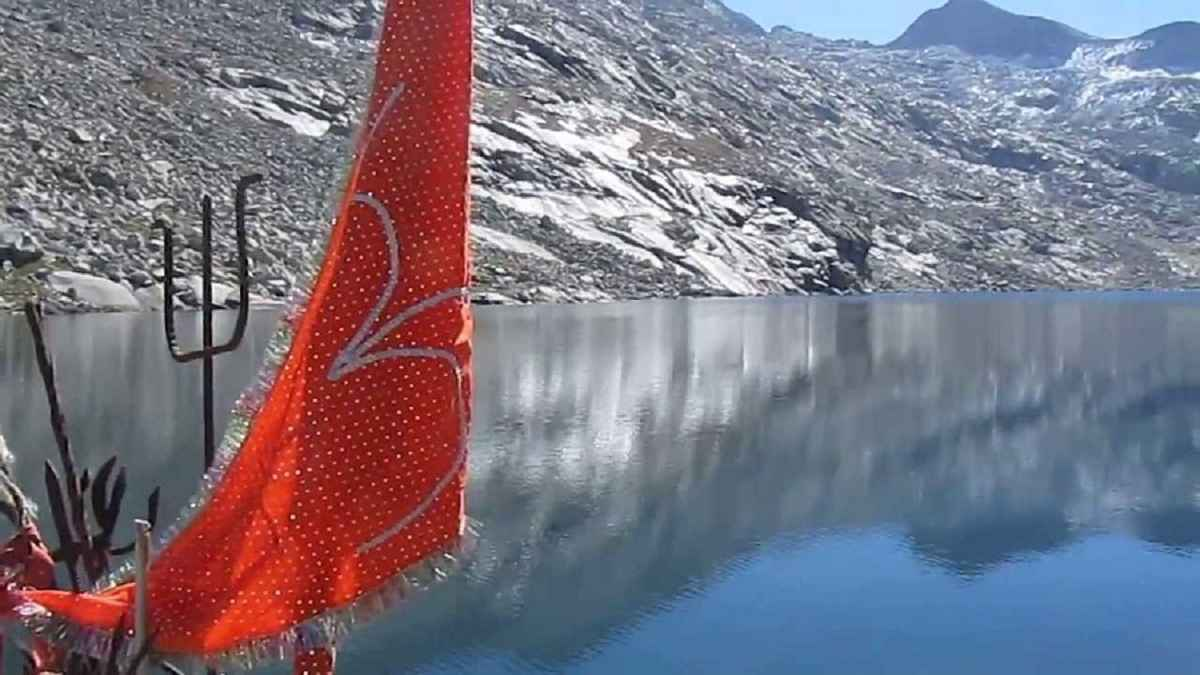
- Shiva Trishula at the Lama Dal lake

- Location within Himachal Pradesh Location within India
- Location: Chamba district
- Coordinates: 32°20′12″N 76°19′51″E
- Lake type: High altitude lake
- Basin countries: India
- Surface elevation: 3,960 m (12,990 ft)
- References: Himachal Pradesh Tourism Dep.

Lam Dal or Laam Dal is a high altitude lake located in Piura Dhar of Chamba district in Himachal Pradesh, India. It is situated 45 km from the town of Chamba at an elevation of about 3,960 metres (12,990 ft) above the sea level.

== History ==
Lama Dal lake is held sacred to Lord Shiva. It is part of holy pilgrimage that is held in July/August based on Hindu calendar. Kareri Lake is situated just 3 km (air distance) south west. This lake is a moderate/advance trekking destination accessible via Ghera (road accessible) - Kareri - Kareri Lake and also via Mcleod Gung (road accessible) - Truid - Bagga trail.
