= McLeod Ganj =

Hill station and suburb in Himachal Pradesh, India

McLeod Ganj McLeodganj
- Hill station
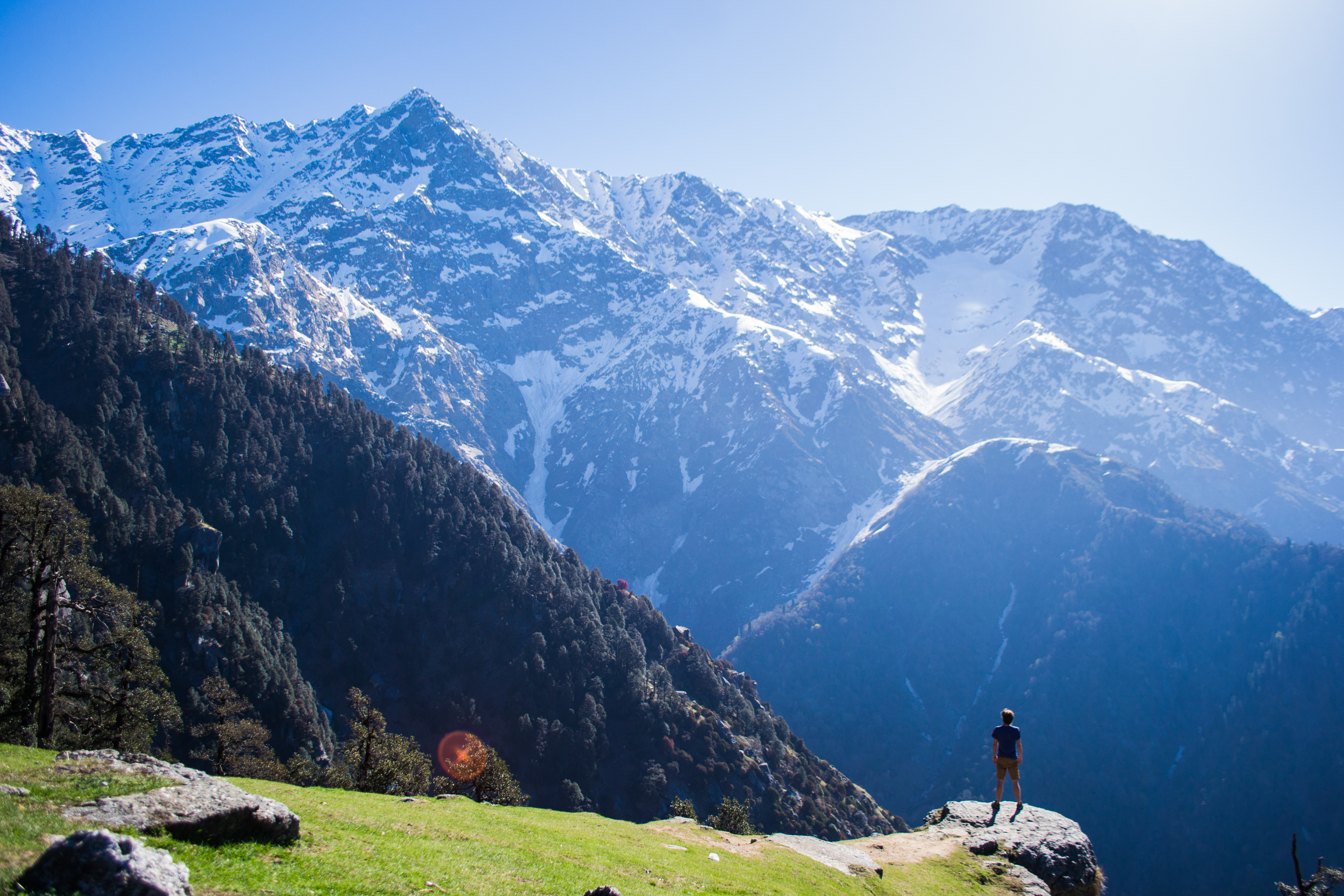
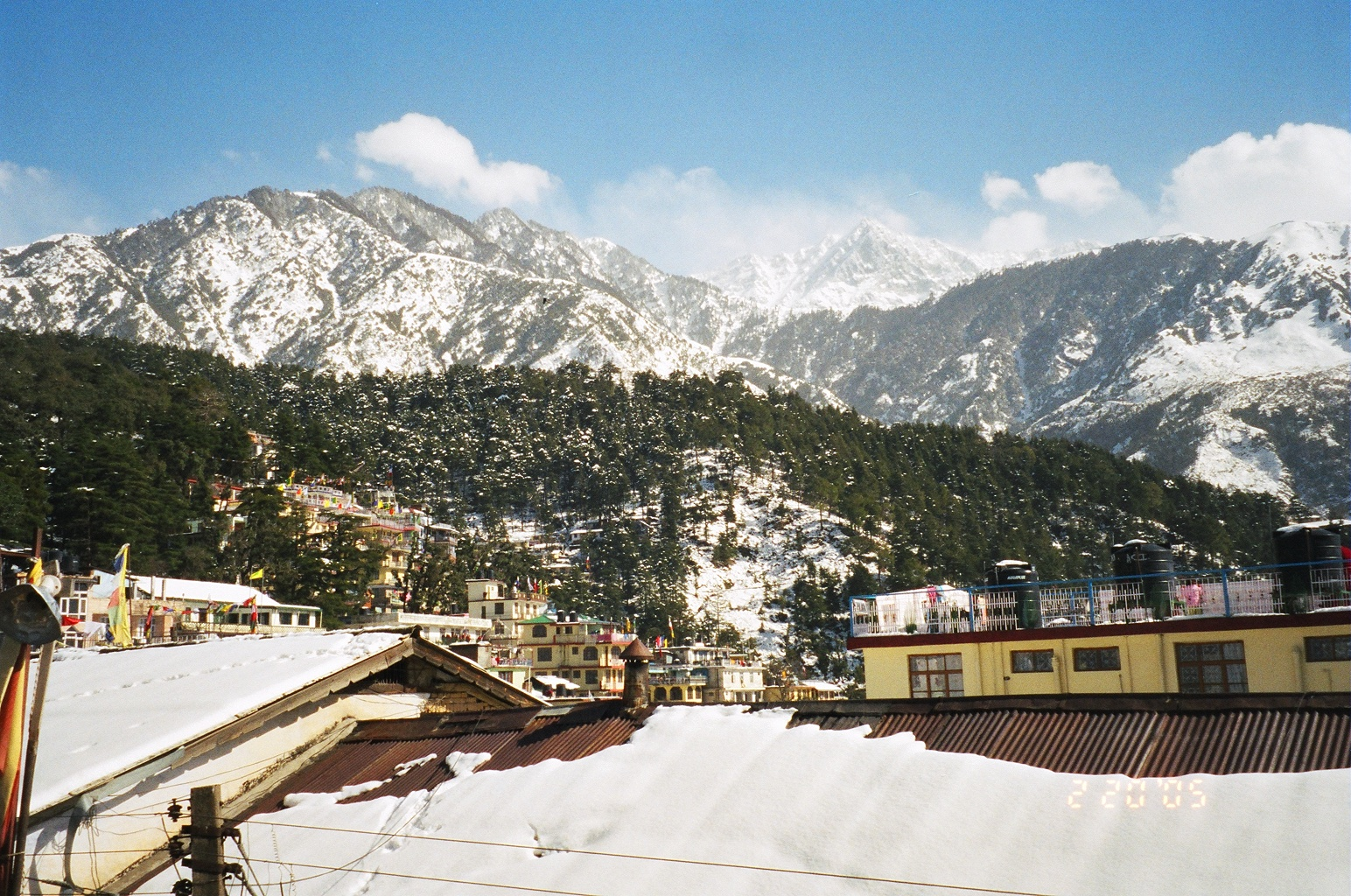
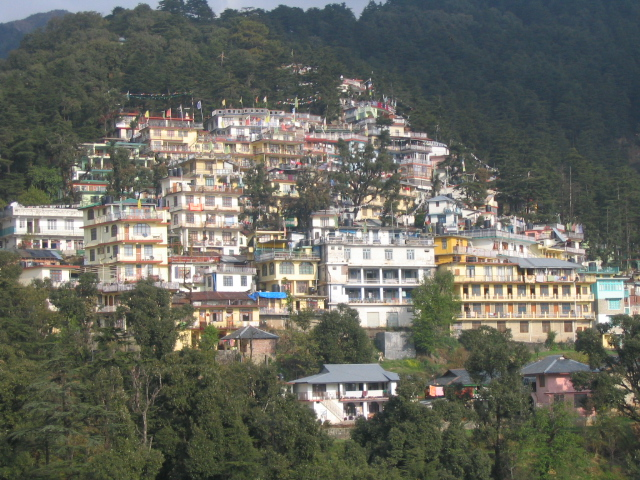
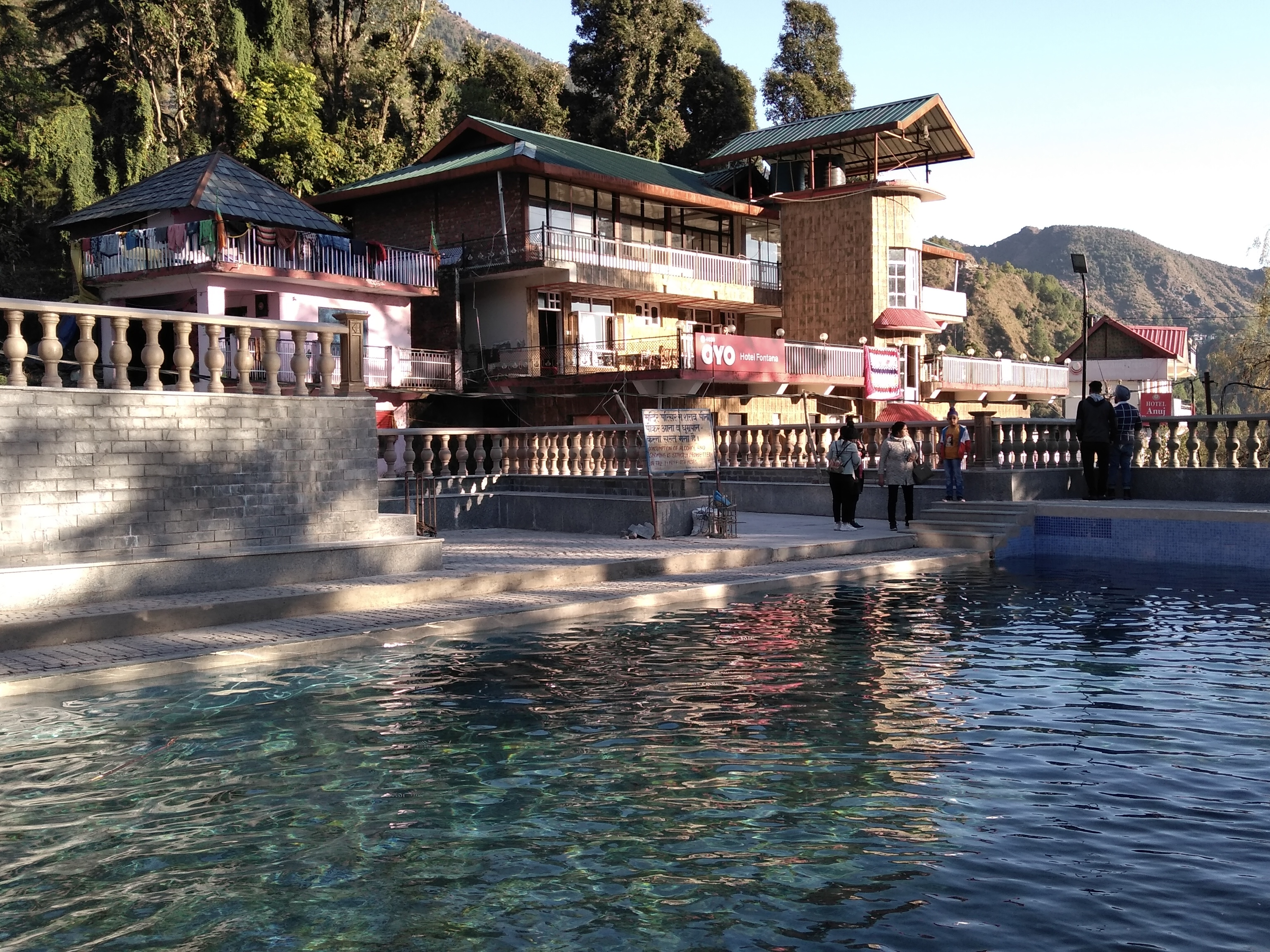
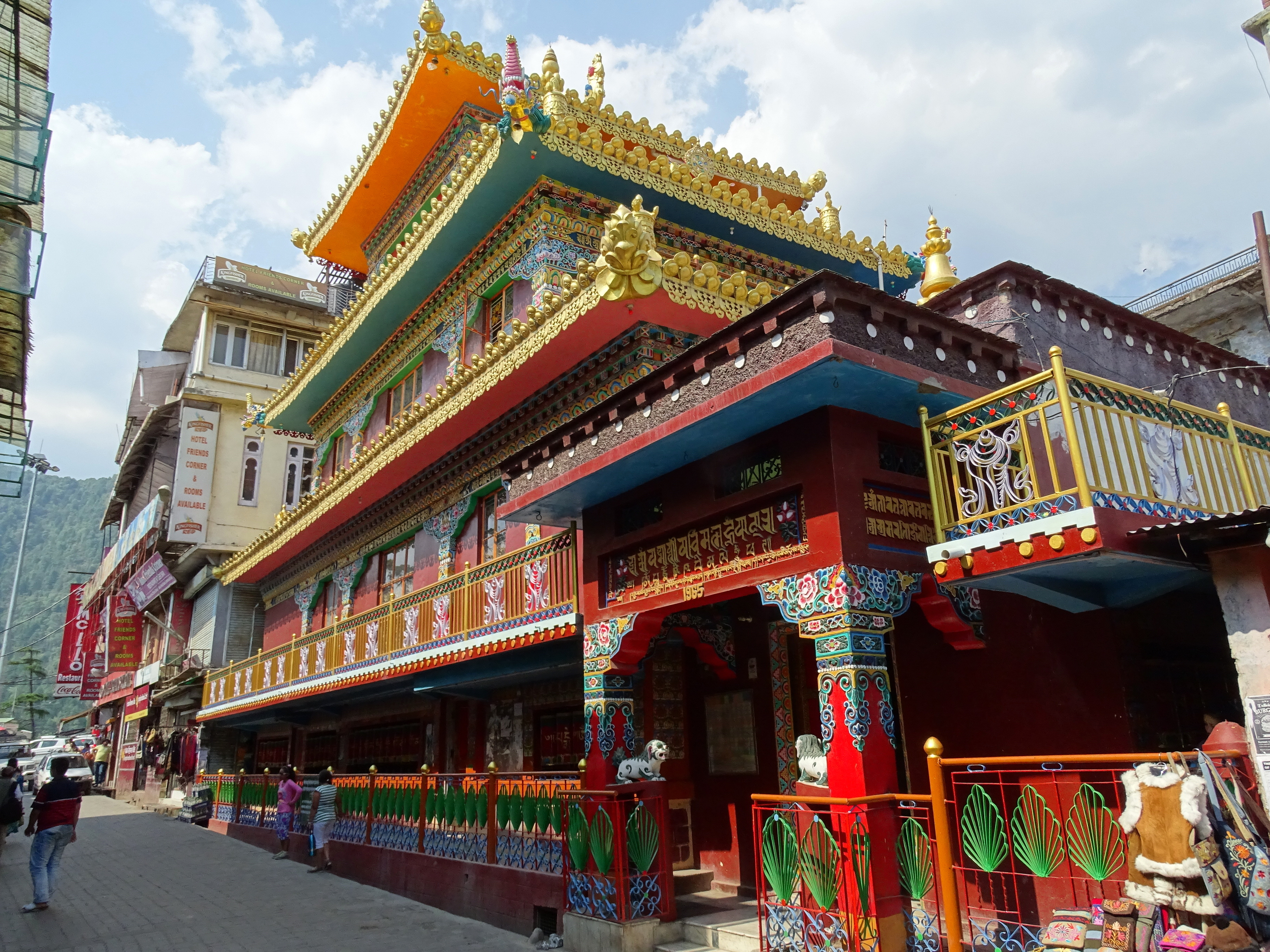
- From top, left to right: Triund, Mcleodganj during winter skyline of Mcleod ganj, Bhagsunag Temple, Kalachakra Temple
- Nicknames: Little Lhasa, or Dhasa charchit
- Location in Himachal Pradesh, India McLeod Ganj (India)
- Coordinates: 32°14′19″N 76°19′25″E
- Country: India
- State: Himachal Pradesh
- District: Kangra
- Named for: Donald Friell McLeod
- Elevation: 2,082 m (6,831 ft)

Population
  - Total: 11,000 (approx.)

Languages
  - Official: Hindi
  - Native: Pahari (Palampuri Kangri)
- Time zone: UTC+5:30 (IST)
- PIN: 176215
- Telephone Code: 01892

McLeod Ganj or McLeodganj (pronounced /məˈklaʊd ˌɡʌndʒ/) is a suburb of Dharamshala town, in the Kangra district, Himachal Pradesh, India. It is known as "Little Lhasa" as the Tibetan government-in-exile is headquartered there, and the region has a significant population of Tibetans.

== Etymology ==
McLeod Ganj was named after Sir Donald Friell McLeod, a Lieutenant Governor of Punjab during British colonial rule in India; the suffix ganj is a common Persian word used for "neighbourhood".

== History ==
=== Early history ===
The region is mentioned in ancient Hindu scriptures such as the Rig Veda and Mahabharata. There are mentions of the region by Pāṇini in 4th century BC and by Chinese traveler Heun Tsang during the reign of king Harshavardhana in 7th century AD. The indigenous people of the Dharamshala area (and the surrounding region) are the Gaddis, a predominantly Hindu group who traditionally lived a nomadic or semi-nomadic transhumant lifestyle.

The region was attacked by Mahmud of Ghazni in 1009 and Firuz Shah Tughlaq in 1360. In 1566, Akbar captured the region and brought it under the Mughal rule. As Mughal rule disintegrated, Sikh chieftain Jai Singh brought the region under his control and gave it to Sansar Chand of the Katoch dynasty in 1785. Gurkhas invaded and captured the region in 1806 before being defeated by Ranjit Singh in 1809. The Katoch dynasty was reduced to the status of jagirdars under the treaty of Jawalamukhi signed by Chand and Singh in 1810. After Chand died, Ranjit Singh annexed the region into the Sikh empire.

=== British rule ===
The British captured the region after the First Anglo-Sikh War of 1846. Under the British Raj, the region was part of undivided province of Punjab, and was ruled by the governors of Punjab from Lahore. In 1860, the 66th Gurkha Light Infantry was moved from Kangra to Dharamshala, which was at first made a subsidiary cantonment. The Battalion was later renamed 1st Gurkha Rifles. Dharamshala became a popular hill station during the Raj. In 1905, a major earthquake in the Kangra Valley destroyed much of the cantonment and killed nearly 20,000 people, including 1,625 at Dharmasala.

=== Post independence ===
After Indian Independence in 1947, McLeod Ganj remained a small hill station. On 29 April 1959, the 14th Dalai Lama established the Tibetan exile administration in Mussoorie when he had to flee Tibet. In May 1960, the Central Tibetan Administration was moved to Dharamshala when Jawaharlal Nehru, then Prime Minister of India, allowed the Dalai Lama and his followers to settle in McLeod Ganj. There they established the "government-in-exile" in 1960 and the Namgyal Monastery. In 1970, the Dalai Lama opened the Library of Tibetan Works and Archives, one of the most important institutions for Tibetology.

Several thousand Tibetan exiles have settled in the area. Monasteries, temples, and schools have been built. McLeod Ganj has become an important tourist destination, with many hotels and restaurants. In 2017, Dharamshala was made Himachal Pradesh's winter capital, with the legislative assembly at Sidhbari.

== Geography ==
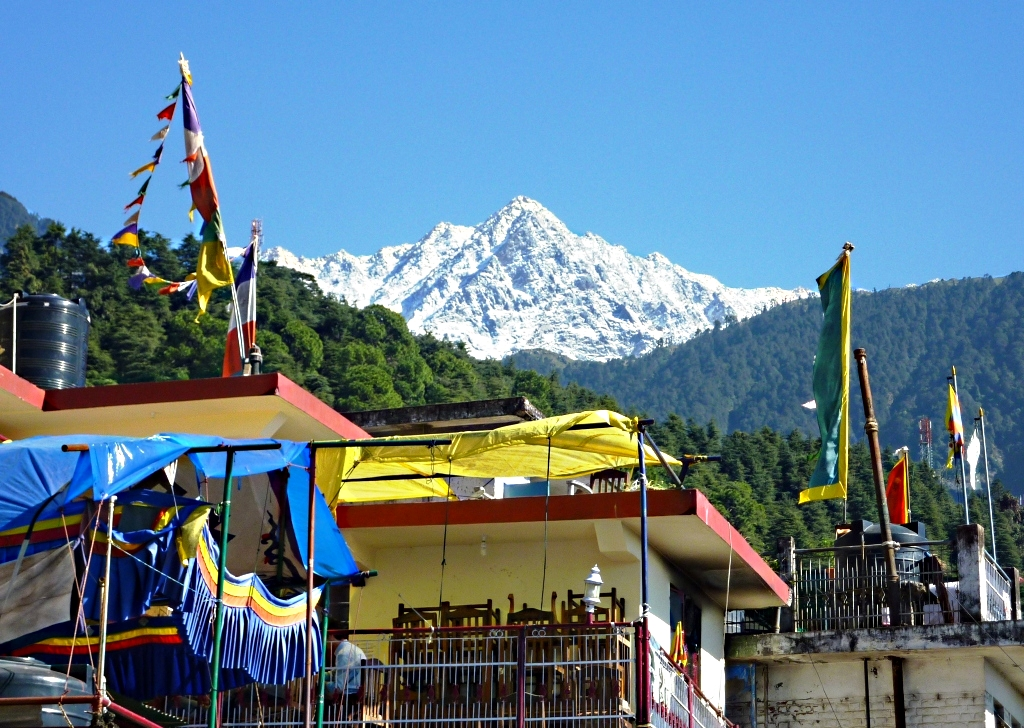
Moon Peak in the Dhauladhar mountain range, viewed from McLeod Ganj

McLeod Ganj has an average elevation of 2,082 m (6,831 ft). It is in the Kangra Valley, in the shadow of the Dhauladhar mountains, and is part of the town of Dharamshala.

== Transport ==
=== Road ===
NH 503 starts from Dharmashala and connects the town to Hoshiarpur in Punjab via Kangra. State highways link the town with NH 154 running from Pathankot to Mandi, Himachal Pradesh. Buses connect the town with other major locations nearby.

=== Air ===
The region is served by Kangra Ghaggal airport, about 12 km to the town's south.

=== Rail ===
Pathankot, 90 km away, is the nearest major rail head. The Kangra Valley Railway is a 2 ft 6 in (762 mm) gauge railway that runs from Pathankot, Punjab, to Jogindernagar through the Kangra Valley. The nearest station to Dharamshala is Chamunda Marg, about 22 km (14 mi) southeast.

=== Ropeway ===
A 1.8 km long ropeway connecting Dharamshala and McLeod Ganj via cable car was inaugurated in 2022.

== Economy ==
The region is a major hill station and spiritual centre. It hosts a number of trekking trails across the Himalayas into the upper Ravi Valley and Chamba district. Major trekking trails include hikes to Toral Pass (4575m), Bhimghasutri Pass (4580m), Dharamshala–Bleni Pass (3710m), Kareri lake and Triund. It is a major centre of Tibetan Buddhism and known for its Tibetan handicrafts, thangkas, Tibetan carpets, garments, and other souvenirs.

Tsuglag Khang, the Dalai Lama's temple, has statues of Shakyamuni, Avalokiteśvara, and Padmasambhava. Other Buddhist and Tibetan sites include the Namgyal Monastery, Gompa Dip Tse-Chok Ling monastery, Library of Tibetan Works and Archives, Gangchen Kyishong (Tibetan government-in-exile), Mani Lakhang Stupa, Nechung Monastery, and Norbulingka Institute. The Tibet Museum, established in 1998, has a collection of Tibetan artifacts and photographs showing Tibetans' struggle and way of life. Ogyen Trinley Dorje, the 17th Karmapa, lives near Dharamshala in Gyuto monastery in Sidhbari. St. John in the Wilderness is an Anglican church near Forsyth Ganj. The neo-Gothic stone building was constructed in 1852 and hosts a graveyard and a memorial to the British Viceroy Lord Elgin. Dal Lake is a small lake about 3 km from McLeod Ganj, next to one of the Tibetan Children's Villages schools. An annual fair is held there and there is a small spring and an old temple near the lake. Bhagsu is an area with a temple dedicated to Bhagsu Nath (Lord Shiva). Bhagsu falls is a waterfall about 20 metres tall near the temple. The Dharamshala International Film Festival (DIFF) is held annually.

The Manimahesh trek is a popular pilgrimage route in Himachal Pradesh.

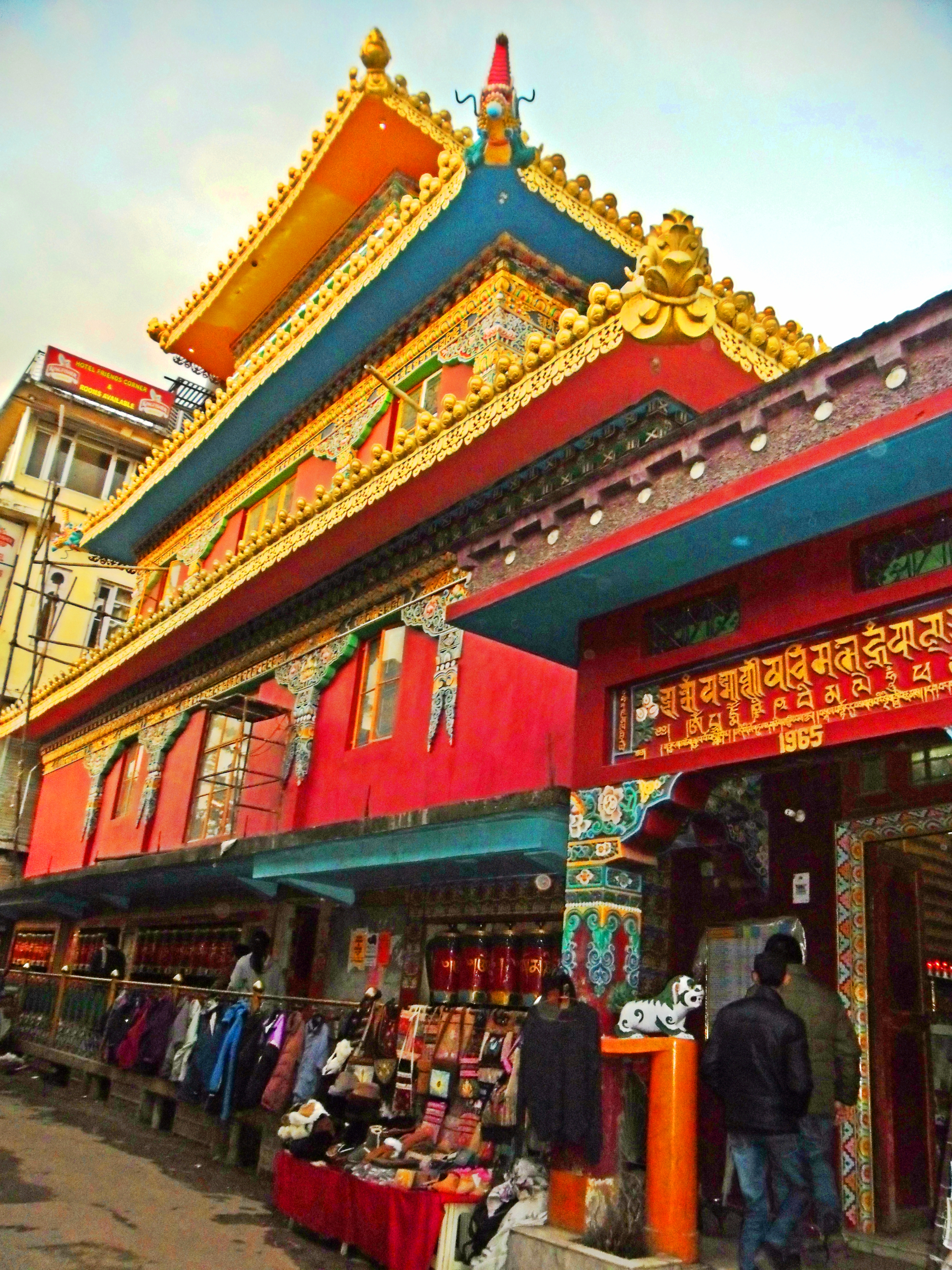
Kalachakra Temple in the main street of Mcleod Ganj

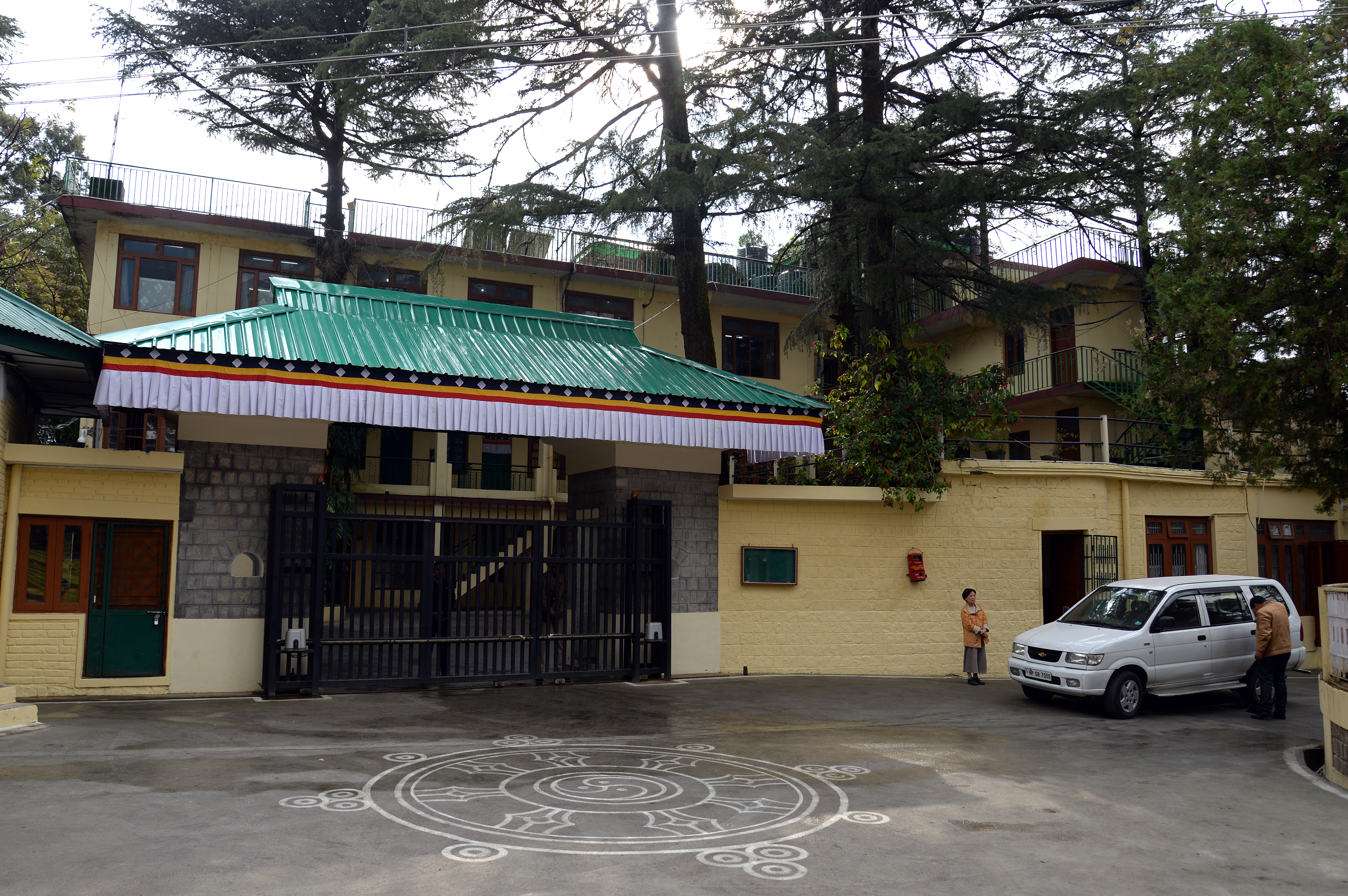
Residence of the Dalai Lama
