= Triund =

- Interactive map of Triund
- Coordinates: 32.2496°N 76.3339°E
- Country: India
- State: Himachal Pradesh
- District: Kangra
- Elevation: 2,850 m (9,350 ft)

Hindi, English
- Time zone: UTC+5:30 (IST)
- Area code: +91-01892

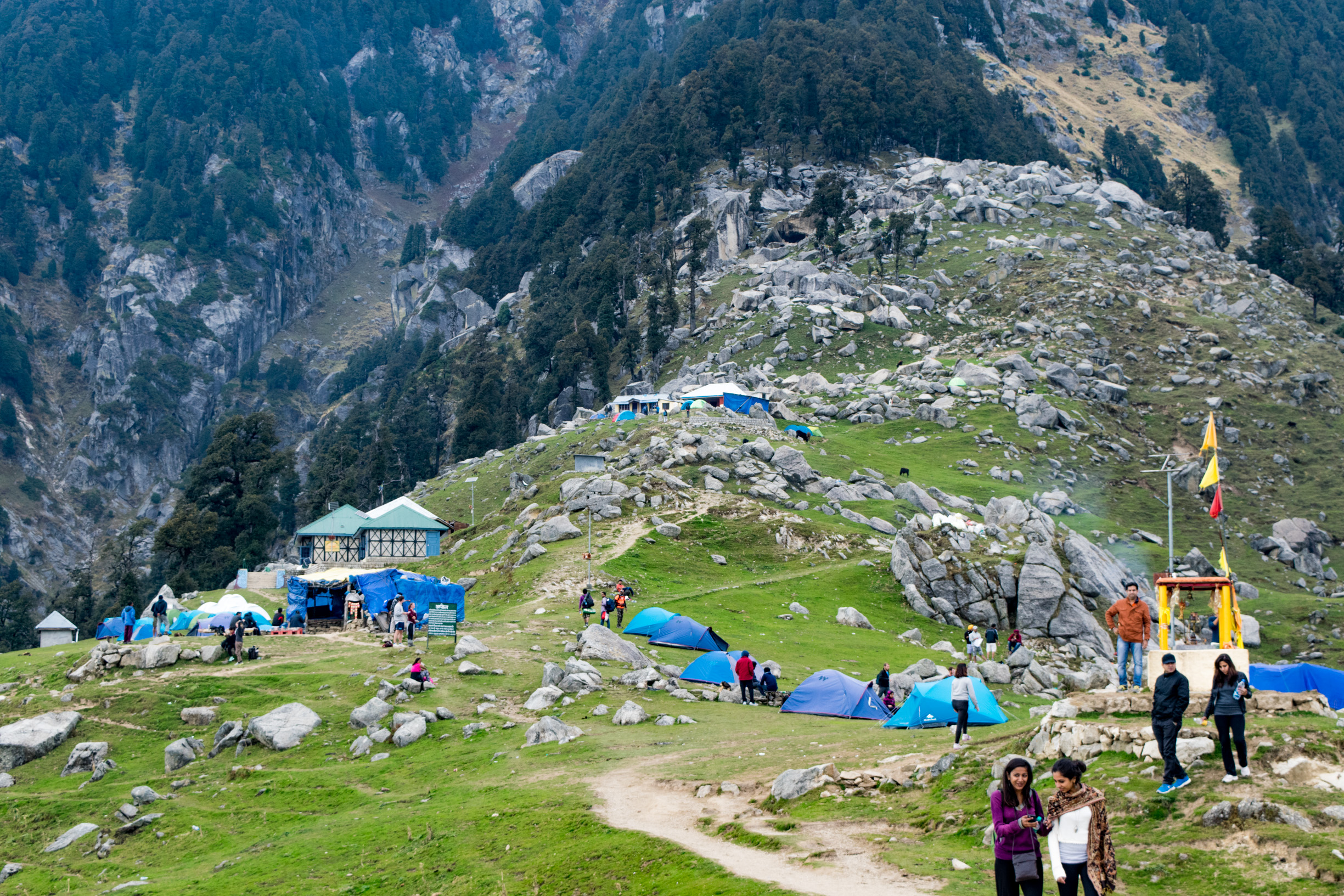
The Triund meadow. The Forest Rest House is visible to the left.

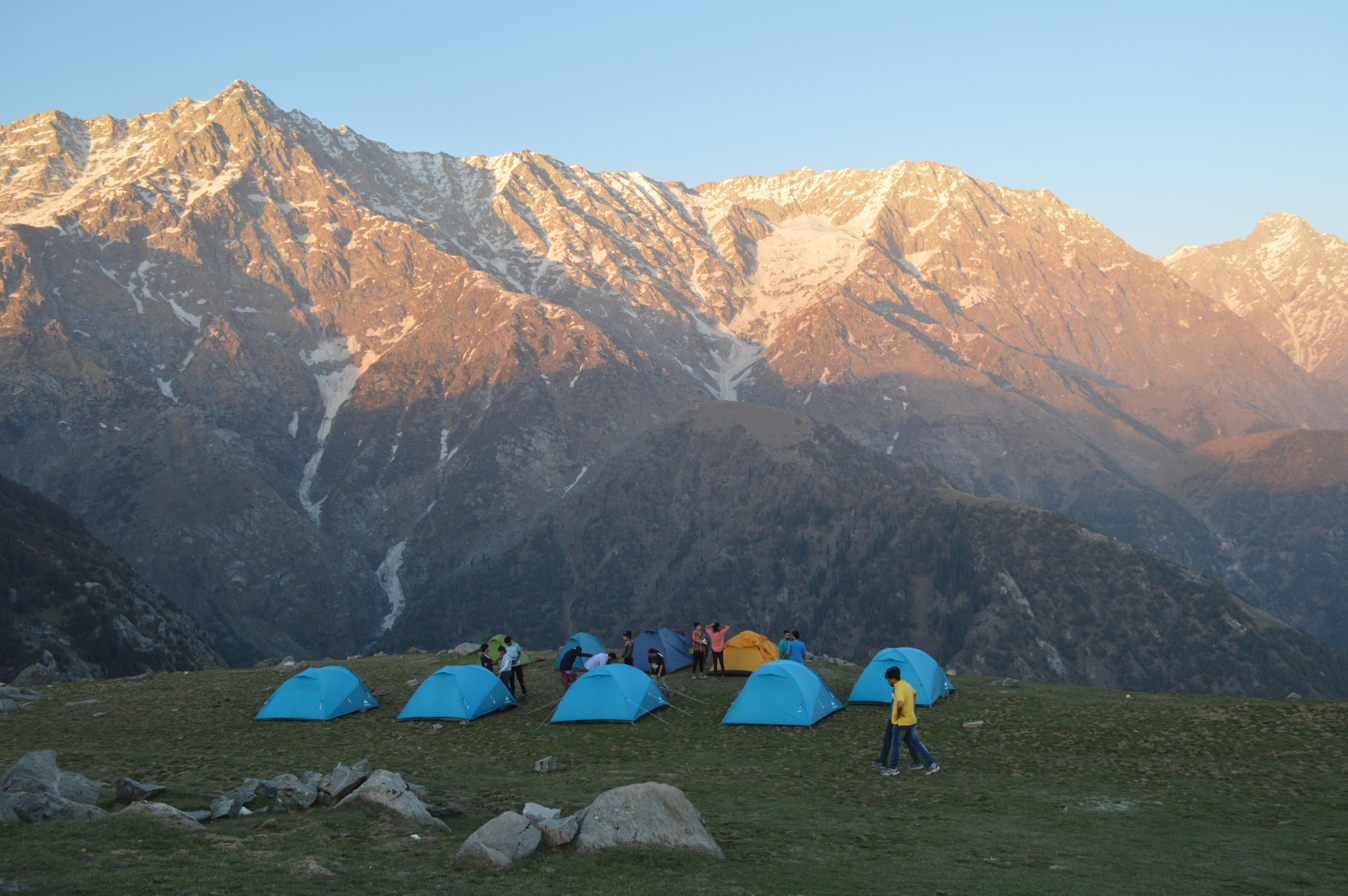
A view of the Dhauladhar range from Triund.

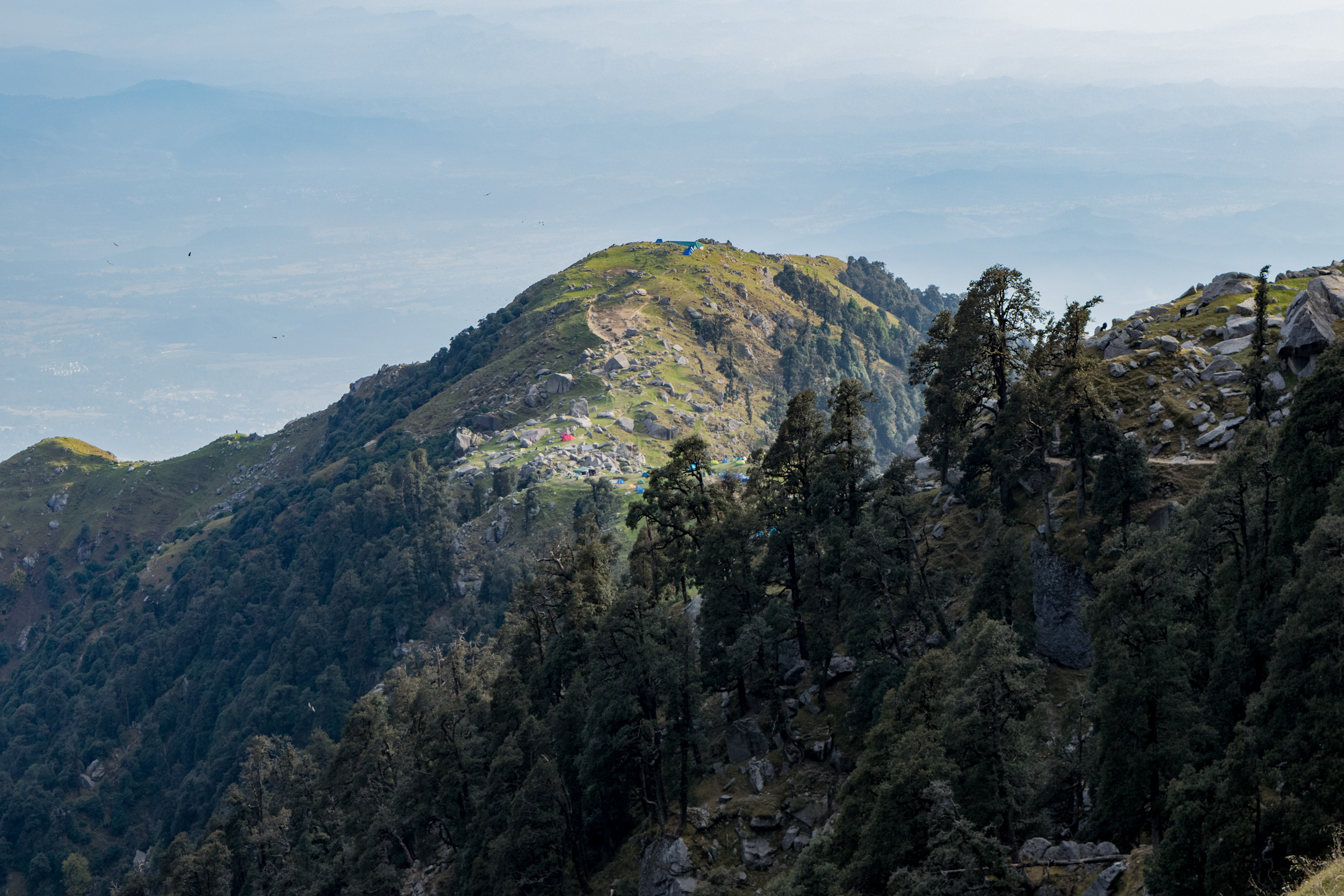
Triund meadow from above.

Triund is a meadow in the mountains above McLeodganj, in the Kangra district of Himachal Pradesh, India. Triund is located on a spur along the southern aspect of the Dhauladhar range, and is at a height of about 2,800-2,900 m. It is known as a scenic spot, the end point of a popular trek, and a stage in climbing mountains and passes of the Dhauladhar range.

== History ==
=== Pastoralism ===
For many generations, Triund has been an important meadow and halting point for Gaddi herders and their flocks of goats and sheep en route Dhauladhar range's Indrahar pass.

=== Forest Rest House ===
The British colonial government first built a forest rest house at Triund over 1899-1900, at the cost of Rs. 980 at that time. It was destroyed in the Kangra earthquake of 1905.

The forest rest house had been rebuilt by the 1920s. One website mentions that the rest house at Triund was built in 1913-14, but does not cite any reference. In any case, this rebuilt rest house was again destroyed at some point towards the end of the 1920s - this time by an accidental fire - and was proposed to be replaced by 1930-31.

The first post-Independence mention of the forest rest house at Triund comes from 1951, from an Italian geography research paper on the topography and toponomy of Kangra valley. The paper mentions a 'current building' of the forest rest house at Triund, as well as the perimeter of the older destroyed building a few metres away, without mentioning when the 'current building' was built.

In May 2011, lightening struck the forest rest house at Triund, causing a major fire. At the time, 31 students and their teachers from a school in Punjab were staying at the rest house. They narrowly escaped unscathed.

=== Trekking and climbing ===
The British used Triund as a camping spot en route climbs of the Indrahar pass, Mon Peak, Slab Peak, and other points in the Dhauladhar range.

== The Triund Trek ==
Trekkers can walk or drive from McLeodganj to the Galu temple above Dharamkot. From the Galu temple, a well-marked trail leads to the Triund meadow. It passes through a forest of oak and rhododendron. Most of the trail ascends gradually. But the final section before arriving at the Triund meadow is steep, through a number of zigzags. The Triund area is rich in wildlife, including black bear, monal, leopard, and a large variety of birds. Triund provides a panoramic view of the Kangra valley to the south and of the Dhauladhar range to the north. Triund is popular among bird-watchers and star-gazers, and as a scenic day hike.

== See also ==
- Dhauladhar
- Dharamshala
- McLeodGanj
- Kangra district

== Other websites ==
Media related to Triund at Wikimedia Commons
