= Dhauladhar =

Himalayan mountain range in India

Coordinates: 32°29′10″N 76°05′50″E

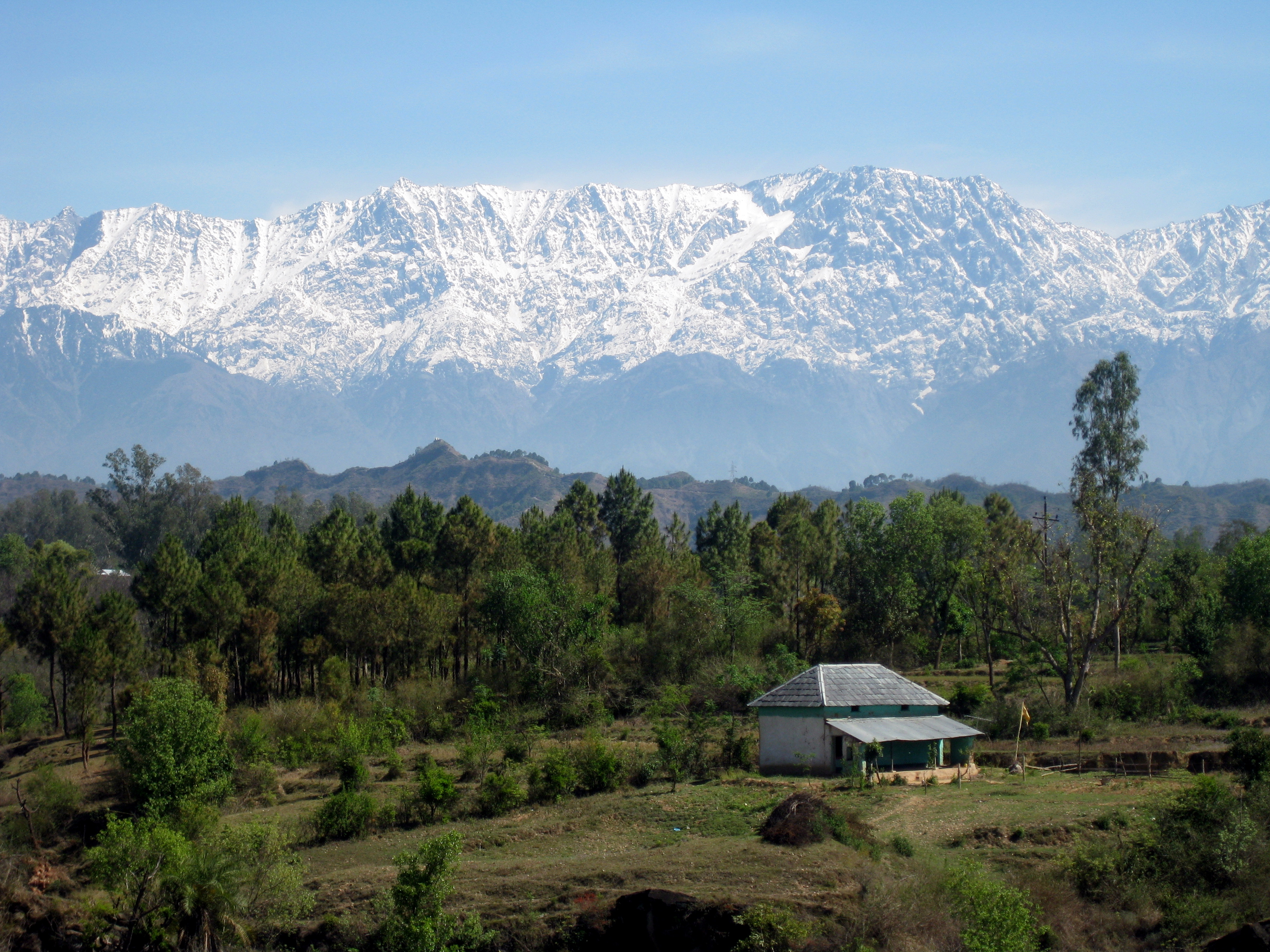
A cottage in the laps of Dhauladhar ranges in the Kangra valley.

Dhauladhar (Hindi: धौलाधार) (lit. 'The White Range') (Note: The word “Dhaula” धौला means absolutely pure, clear, nirmal (clean), and dhar धार means range.) is a mountain range which is part of a lesser Himalayan chain of mountains in northern India. It rises from the Shivalik hills, to the north of Kangra and Mandi. Dharamsala, the headquarters of Kangra district and the winter capital of the state of Himachal Pradesh, lies on its southern spur in the Kangra Valley. Chamba lies to the North of this range.

== Overview ==
The Dhauladhar range is one of the ranges of the Middle Himalayas. They begin from near Dalhousie at the northwest end of Himachal Pradesh and pass through the state to the vicinity of the bank of the Beas River in the Kulu district of Himachal Pradesh. They begin to merge with the Pir Panjal near Manali. They are entirely in Himachal Pradesh. They are distinctive in their typical dark granite rocky formations with a remarkably steep rise culminating in sharp streaks of snow and ice at the top of their crested peaks. This distinctive profile is best seen from the Kangra Valley from where they seem to shoot up almost vertically. The range begins near Dalhousie and passes through the state to the vicinity of the bank of the Beas River. In the Mandi district, the range is notable for the Uhl River valley, which is a major tributary of the Beas and home to the historic Shanan Power House. The Dhauladhar eventually begins to merge with the Pir Panjal near Manali.

The elevation of the Dhauladhars ranges widely from 3,500 m to nearly 6,056 m. The highest peak in the range is the Hanuman Tibba, 5,982 metres (19,626 ft) above sea level. There are several peaks which are close to 5500 m (17,000 ft). From the banks of the Beas River in Kulu, the range curves towards the town of Mandi, Himachal Pradesh, India. Then, running north, it passes through Bada Bhangal, joins the Pir Panjal Range and moves into Chamba.

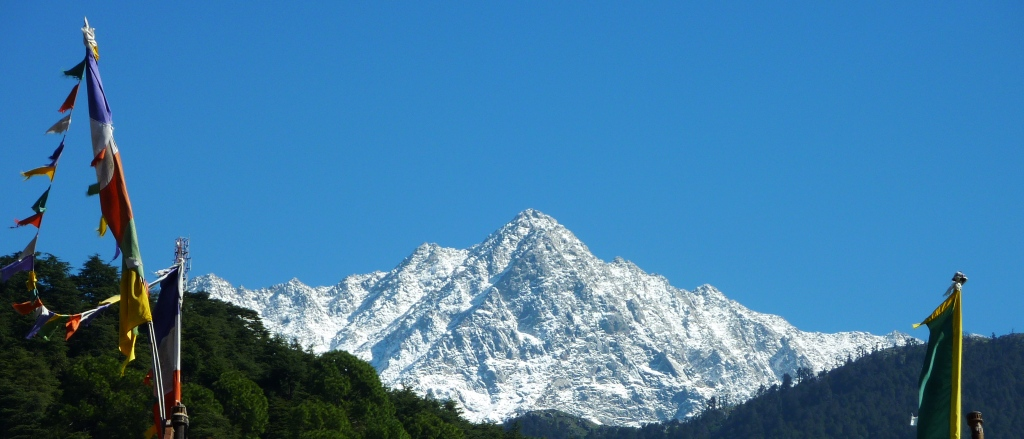
Moon Peak (4,650 metres) in the Dhauladhar range from McLeod Ganj.

The Dhauladhars have a peculiar topography. Although mostly composed of granite, the flanks of the range exhibit frequent formations of slate (often used for the roofs of houses in the region), limestone and sandstone. Ascending from any side is difficult, given the near vertical incline. This calls for highly technical trekking and mountaineering. There is very little habitation on the range given the harsh conditions. But meadows abound near the crest providing rich pastures for grazing where large numbers of Gaddi shepherds take their flocks. The top of the crest is buried under vast expanses of thick snow. Triund, approached from the hill station of McLeod Ganj, is the nearest and most accessible snow line in the Indian Himalayas. The range has rich flora and fauna.

Peaks, virgin and scaled, have drawn mountaineers from all over the world. Some of the well-known ones are Mun (4610 m) near Dharamshala, Manimahesh Kailash (मणिमहेश कैलाश) (5653 m) in the sacred Manimahesh region, Gauri Junda (4946 m), near the Talang pass, which is commonly referred to as the 'Dhauladhar Matterhorn', Christmas (4581 m), Toral (4686 m), Dromedary (4553 m), Riflehorn (4400 m), Lantern (5100 m), Arthur's Seat (4525 m), Camel (4520 m), Slab (4570 m), and several other named and unnamed peaks. Due to the position of the range it receives two monsoons a year with heavy rains; where the mountains have not been heavily logged, there are dense pine and Deodar forests.

There are glacial lakes in the Dhauladhars. Prominent among them is the Lam Dal which is the biggest with a circumference of about 2.5 km. It is a very sacred lake and considered to be the abode of Lord Shiva alongside Manimahesh Lake. Each year pilgrims take a holy dip in August and September just when the Manimahesh yatra begins. There are other very sacred lakes like the Nag Dal/Nag Chattri Dal. This lake owes its history to the Bhagsunag Temple and is considered sacred. It is dedicated to the Nag Devta or the Lord King Cobra. The other beautiful lakes are the Chanderkup Dal above the Lam Dal, Kareri Lake below the Minkaini Pass, Dehnasar Lake across the Sari Pass and the very sacred Kali Kund just 150 m below the Lam Dal at an elevation of 3900 m and approachable from Minkiani Pass (4250 metres).

One of the major passes across this range is the Indrahar Pass. At an altitude of 4,342 metres (14,245 ft) above mean sea level, near the tourist town of Dharamshala in Himachal Pradesh, Indrahar Pass forms the border between Kangra and Chamba districts. It is part of a popular trekking route from Dharamshala Including Triund Trek, Mun Peak Expedition from the Indrahar Pass, Seven Lake Trek Lake starting from Kareri Lake, Kareri Lake Trek, Lam Dal Lake Trek increases substantial tourist traffic during the trekking season between April and October.

The Dhauladhar mountain range became visible after 30 years in Jalandhar, Punjab, less than 200 km away, after pollution levels came down amidst the COVID-19 lockdown in March 2020.

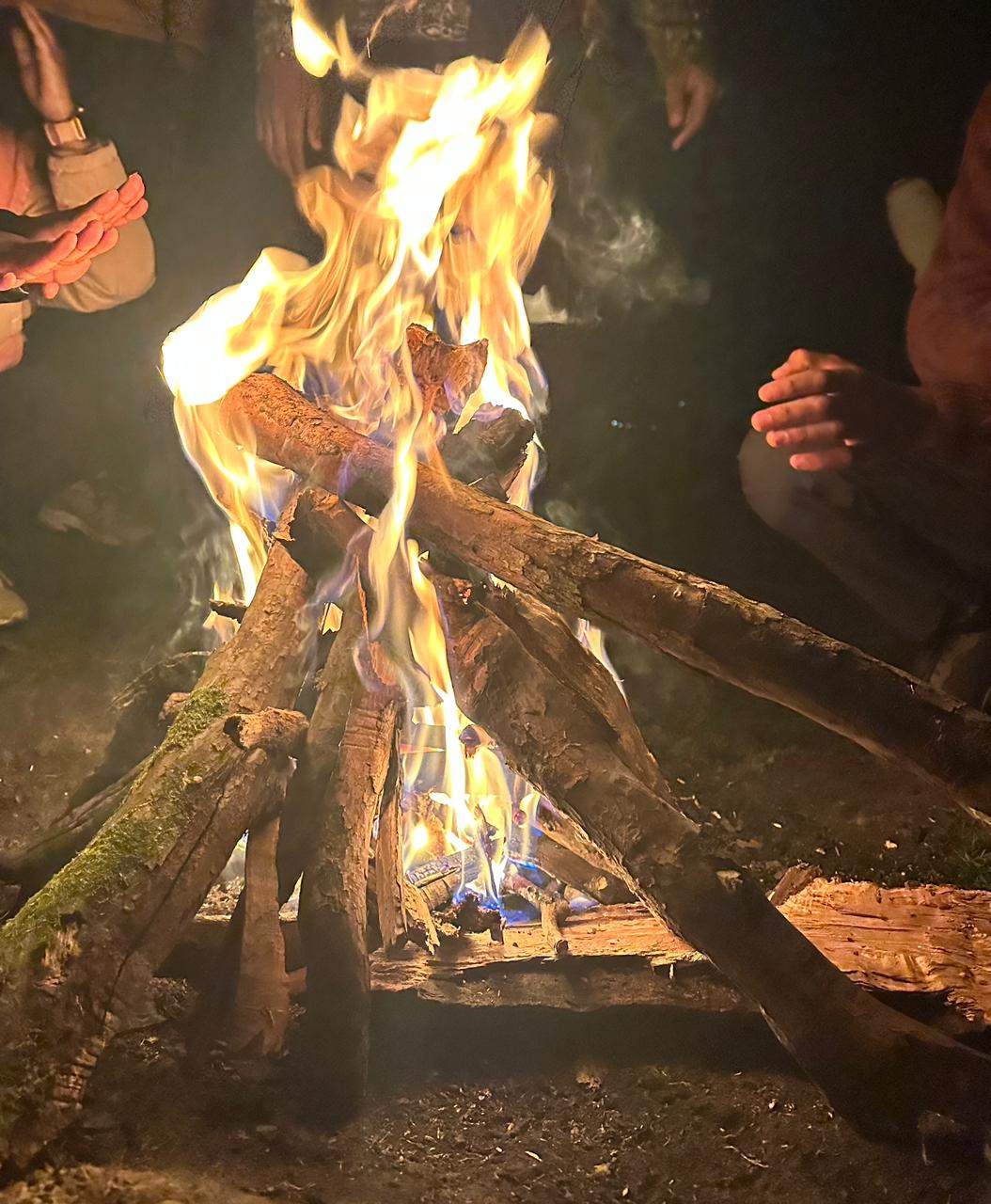

== Gallery ==
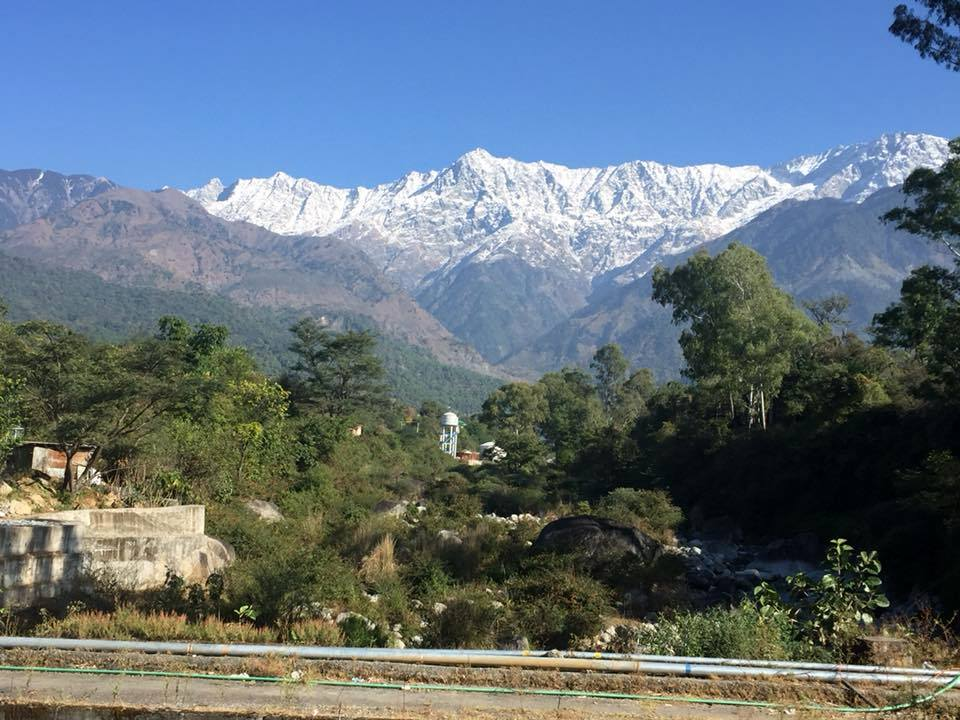
Dhauladhar mountain ranges, view from Dharamshala

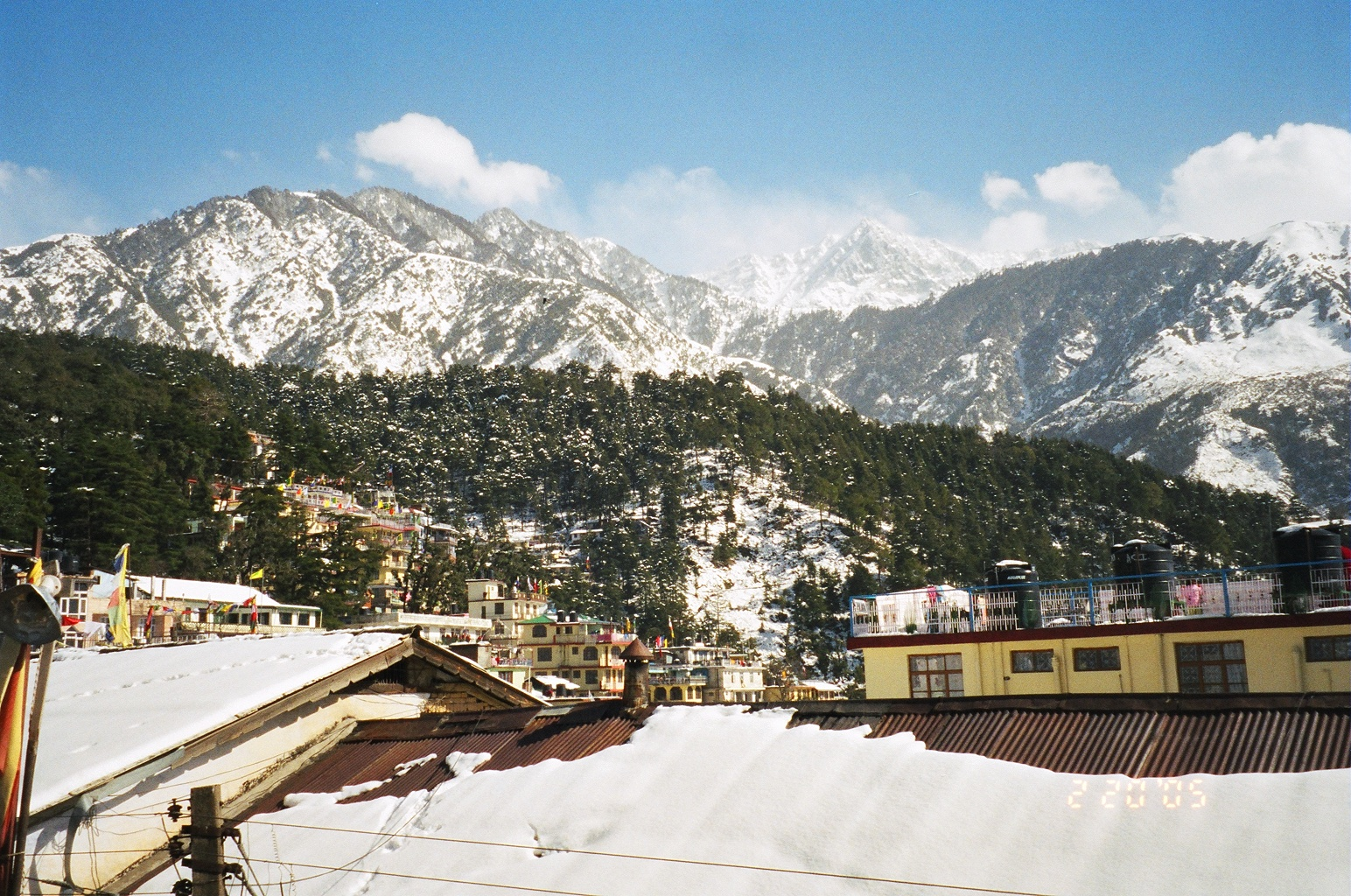

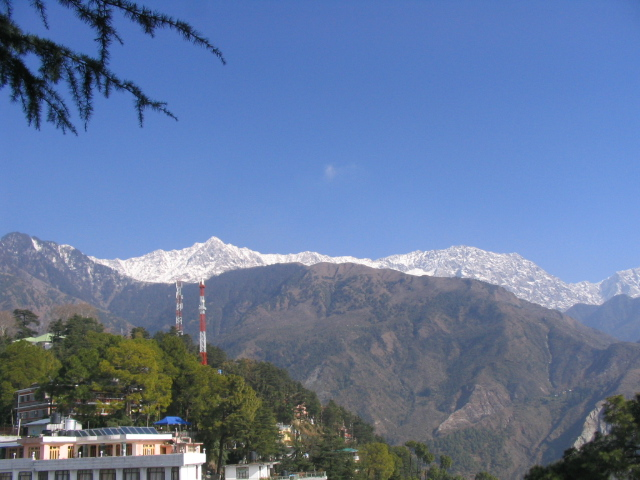
Dhauladhar from Dharamsala

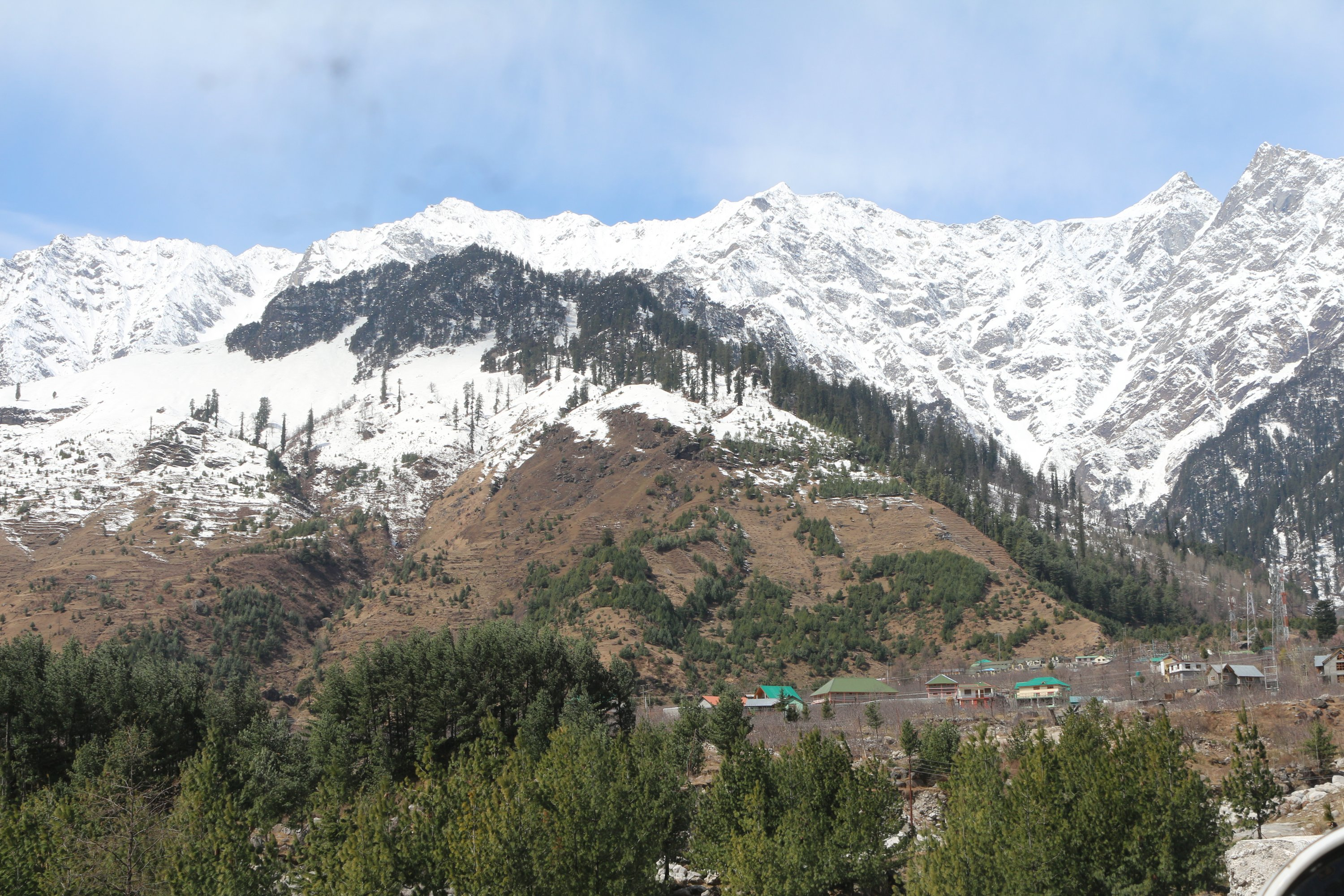

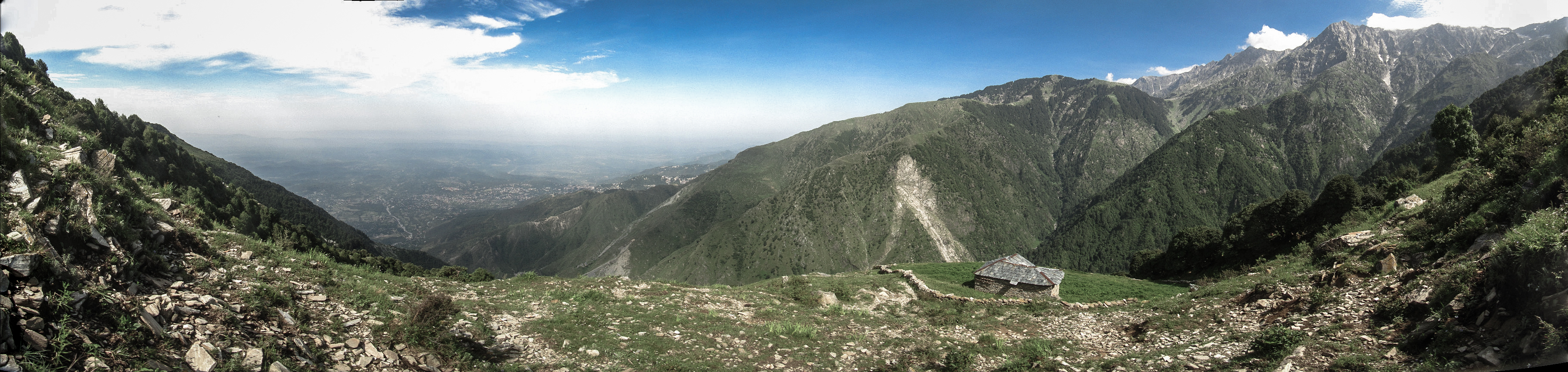
A panoramic view of the Dhauladhar range showing its ascent from Dari(1100m) in the Kangra Valley to Kundli Pass(4550m)

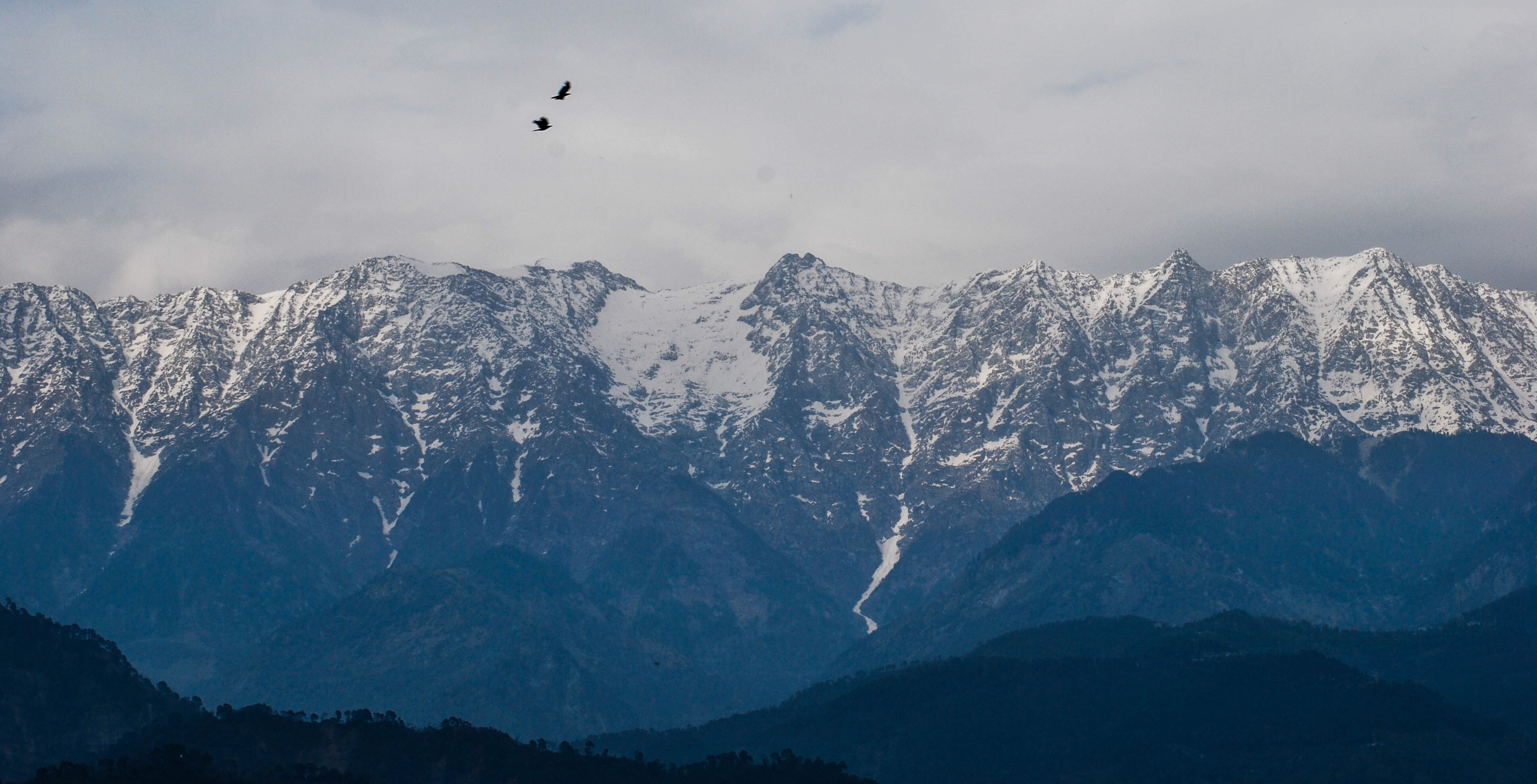
Dhauladhar range

== See also ==
- Rupin Pass
- Indrahar Pass
- Kundli Pass
- Jalsu Pass
- Minkiani Pass
- Thamsar Pass
