= List of Padma Bhushan award recipients (1960–1969) =

List of recipients of a civilian award in India

Padma Bhushan
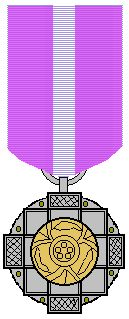
- Type: National Civilian
- Country: India
- Presented by: Government of India
- Ribbon
- Obverse: A centrally located lotus flower is embossed and the text "Padma" written in Devanagari script is placed above and the text "Bhushan" is placed below the lotus.
- Reverse: A platinum State Emblem of India placed in the centre with the national motto of India, "Satyameva Jayate" (Truth alone triumphs) in Devanagari Script
- Established: 1954
- First award: 1954

Highlights
- Total: 200
- Website: http://www.padmaawards.gov.in/

Precedence
- Next (higher): Padma Vibhushan

- Next (lower): Padma Shri

The Padma Bhushan is the third-highest civilian award of the Republic of India. Instituted on 2 January 1954, the award is given for "distinguished service of a high order", without distinction of race, occupation, position, or sex. The recipients receive a Sanad, a certificate signed by the President of India and a circular-shaped medallion with no monetary association. The recipients are announced every year on Republic Day (26 January) and registered in The Gazette of India—a publication used for official government notices and released weekly by the Department of Publication, under the Ministry of Urban Development. The conferral of the award is not considered official without its publication in the Gazette. The name of recipient, whose award have been revoked or restored, both of which require the authority of the President, is archived and they are required to surrender their medal when their name is struck from the register; none of the conferments of Padma Bhushan during 1960–1969 have been revoked or restored. The recommendations are received from all the state and the union territory governments, as well as from Ministries of the Government of India, the Bharat Ratna and the Padma Vibhushan awardees, the Institutes of Excellence, the Ministers, the Chief Ministers and the Governors of State, and the Members of Parliament including private individuals.

When instituted in 1954, the Padma Bhushan was classified as "Dusra Varg" (Class II) under the three-tier Padma Vibhushan awards, which were preceded by the Bharat Ratna in hierarchy. On 15 January 1955, the Padma Vibhushan was reclassified into three different awards as the Padma Vibhushan, the Padma Bhushan and the Padma Shri. The criteria included "distinguished service of a high order in any field including service rendered by Government servants", but excluded those working with the public sector undertakings with the exception of doctors and scientists. The 1954 statutes did not allow posthumous awards; this was subsequently modified in the January 1955 statute. The design was also changed to the form that is currently in use; it portrays a circular-shaped toned bronze medallion 1 3/4 inches (44 mm) in diameter and 1/8 inch (3.2 mm) thick. The centrally placed pattern made of outer lines of a square of 1 3/16 inches (30 mm) side is embossed with a knob carved within each of the outer angles of the pattern. A raised circular space of diameter 1 1/16 inches (27 mm) is placed at the centre of the decoration. A centrally located lotus flower is embossed on the obverse side of the medal and the text "Padma" is placed above and the text "Bhushan" is placed below the lotus written in Devanagari script. The State Emblem of India is displayed in the centre of the reverse side, together with the national motto of India, "Satyameva Jayate" (Truth alone triumphs) in Devanagari script, which is inscribed on the lower edge. The rim, the edges and all embossing on either side is of standard gold with the text "Padma Bhushan" of gold gilt. The medal is suspended by a pink riband 1 1/4 inches (32 mm) in width with a broad white stripe in the middle. It is ranked fifth in the order of precedence of wearing of medals and decorations of the Indian civilian and military awards. (Note: The order of precedence is: Bharat Ratna, Param Vir Chakra, Ashoka Chakra, Padma Vibhushan and Padma Bhushan.)

A total of 200 awards were presented in the 1960s – ten in 1960, followed by thirteen in 1961, twenty-seven in 1962, twelve in 1963, eighteen in 1964, twenty-five in 1965, fourteen in 1966, twenty-four in 1967, twenty-eight in 1968, and twenty-nine in 1969. The Padma Bhushan in the 1960s was also conferred upon five foreign recipients – two from the United States and one each from Canada, Russia, and the United Kingdom. Individuals from nine different fields were awarded, which includes sixty-nine from literature and education, thirty-two from medicine, twenty-two from civil services, seventeen artists, sixteen from public affairs, fifteen from science and engineering, fourteen from social work, ten from trade and industry, and five sportspersons. Journalist Manikonda Chalapathi Rau and Kannada writer K. Shivaram Karanth returned their 1968 awards, while Sitar player Vilayat Khan refused to accept it, with him stating that "the selection committees were incompetent to judge [his] music". (Note: Vilayat Khan had earlier refused Padma Shri (1964) and later also refused Padma Vibhushan (2000).)

== Overview ==
Award recipients by year
Year	Number of recipients
1960	10
1961	13
1962	27
1963	12
1964	18
1965	25
1966	14
1967	24
1968	28
1969	29

Award recipients by field
Field	Number of recipients
Arts	17
Civil Service	22
Literature & Education	69
Medicine	32
Public Affairs	16
Science & Engineering	15
Social Work	14
Sports	5
Trade & Industry	10

== Recipients ==
List of Padma Bhushan award recipients (1954–1959)
Year	Image	Laureates	Field	State / country
1960		Haridas Siddhanta Bagish	Literature and Education	West Bengal
1960		Rabindra Nath Chaudhuri	Medicine	West Bengal
1960		Nilakantha Das	Public Affairs	Orissa
1960		Rajeshwar Shastri Dravid	Literature and Education	Uttar Pradesh
1960		Kazi Nazrul Islam	Literature and Education	West Bengal (Note: Kazi Nazrul Islam was accorded the citizenship of Bangladesh in January 1976.)
1960		Hafiz Ali Khan	Arts	Madhya Pradesh
1960		Bal Krishna Sharma Naveen	Literature and Education	Delhi
1960		Ayyadevara Kaleswara Rao	Public Affairs	Andhra Pradesh
1960		Acharya Shivpujan Sahay	Literature and Education	Bihar
1960		Vithal Nagesh Shirodkar	Medicine	Maharashtra
1961		Tridib Nath Banerjee	Medicine	West Bengal
1961		Rustomji Bomanji Billimoria	Medicine	Maharashtra
1961		Seth Govind Das	Literature and Education	Madhya Pradesh
1961		Verrier Elwin*	Science and Engineering	United Kingdom
1961		Niranjan Das Gulhati	Civil Service	Delhi
1961		L. Venkatakrishna Iyer	Civil Service	Tamil Nadu
1961		Rai Krishnadasa	Literature and Education	Uttar Pradesh
1961		Sumitranandan Pant	Literature and Education	Uttar Pradesh
1961		Svetoslav Roerich*	Arts	Soviet Union
1961		Bhagwan Sahay	Civil Service	Uttar Pradesh
1961		Bindeshwari Prasad Verma	Public Affairs	Bihar
1961		K. Venkataraman	Trade and Industry	Maharashtra
1961		Ardeshir Ruttonji Wadia	Literature and Education	Maharashtra
1962		Ramaswamy Duraiswamy Ayyar	Medicine	Delhi
1962		Gyanesh Chandra Chatterjee	Literature and Education	Delhi
1962		Ramchandra Narayan Dandekar	Literature and Education	Maharashtra
1962		Prem Chandra Dhanda	Medicine	Punjab
1962		Asaf Ali Asghar Fyzee	Literature and Education	Jammu and Kashmir
1962		Bade Ghulam Ali Khan	Arts	Maharashtra
1962		Jafar Ali Khan	Literature and Education	Uttar Pradesh
1962		Daulat Singh Kothari	Civil Service	Delhi
1962		Mithan Jamshed Lam	Public Affairs	Maharashtra
1962		Sudhansu Sobhan Maitra	Medicine	West Bengal
1962		Sisir Kumar Mitra	Literature and Education	West Bengal
1962		Tarabai Modak	Social Work	Maharashtra
1962		Radhakamal Mukerjee	Science and Engineering	Uttar Pradesh
1962		Sudhindra Nath Mukerjee	Public Affairs	West Bengal
1962		Niaz Fatehpuri	Literature and Education	Uttar Pradesh
1962		Jal R. Patel	Medicine	Maharashtra
1962		Narayan Sitaram Phadke	Literature and Education	Maharashtra
1962		V. Raghavan	Literature and Education	Tamil Nadu
1962		Dukhan Ram	Medicine	Bihar
1962		T. S. Soundram	Social Work	Tamil Nadu
1962		Mahankali Seetharama Rao	Medicine	Andhra Pradesh
1962		Raghunath Saran	Medicine	Bihar
1962		Moturi Satyanarayana	Public Affairs	Tamil Nadu
1962		Sitaram Seksaria	Social Work	Assam
1962		Santosh Kumar Sen	Medicine	West Bengal
1962		Tarlok Singh	Civil Service	Punjab
1962		Raja Radhika Raman Sinha	Literature and Education	Bihar
1963		Narendra Nath Bery	Medicine	Punjab
1963		Makhanlal Chaturvedi	Literature and Education	Madhya Pradesh
1963		Omeo Kumar Das	Social Work	Assam
1963		Nitish Chandra Laharry	Social Work	West Bengal
1963		Badri Nath Prasad	Literature and Education	Uttar Pradesh
1963		Kanuri Lakshmana Rao	Civil Service	Delhi
1963		Rahul Sankrityayan	Literature and Education	Uttar Pradesh
1963		Ramanlal Gokaldas Saraiya	Public Affairs	Maharashtra
1963		T. R. Seshadri	Literature and Education	Tamil Nadu
1963		Sardar Harnarain Singh	Civil Service	Punjab
1963		M. L. Soni	Medicine	Delhi
1963		Ramkumar Verma	Literature and Education	Uttar Pradesh
1964		Sheikh Abdullah	Literature and Education	Uttar Pradesh
1964		Nuruddin Ahmed	Public Affairs	Delhi
1964		Rafiuddin Ahmed	Medicine	West Bengal
1964		Jacob Chandy	Medicine	Kerala
1964		Kunji Lal Dubey	Public Affairs	Madhya Pradesh
1964		Tushar Kanti Ghosh	Literature and Education	West Bengal
1964		Anil Bandhu Guha	Civil Service	West Bengal
1964		Mohd. Abdul Hai	Medicine	Bihar
1964		Dara Nusserwanji Khurody	Trade and Industry	Madhya Pradesh
1964		Anukul Chandra Mukherjee	Literature and Education	Uttar Pradesh
1964		Jnanendra Nath Mukherjee	Science and Engineering	West Bengal
1964		Bhola Nath Mullik	Civil Service	Delhi
1964		R. K. Narayan	Literature and Education	Karnataka
1964		Chintaman Govind Pandit	Medicine	Maharashtra
1964		Tribhuvandas Kishibhai Patel	Social Work	Gujarat
1964		Bal Gandharva	Arts	Maharashtra
1964		T. Narayanayajwa Ramachandran	Science and Engineering	Tamil Nadu
1964		Khushwant Lal Wig	Medicine	Punjab
1965		Krishnaswami Balasubramania Iyer	Public Affairs	Tamil Nadu
1965		Jogesh Chandra Banerjee	Medicine	West Bengal
1965		Joginder Singh Dhillon	Civil Service	Punjab
1965		Appasaheb Patwardhan	Public Affairs	Maharashtra
1965		Bhalchandra Babaji Dikshit	Medicine	Maharashtra
1965		Patrick Dunn	Civil Service	Maharashtra
1965		Narasinh Narayan Godbole	Literature and Education	Maharashtra
1965		Nawang Gombu	Sports	West Bengal
1965		Sonam Gyatso	Sports	Sikkim
1965		Kashmir Singh Katoch	Civil Service	Punjab
1965		Akbar Ali Khan	Public Affairs	Telangana
1965		Shantanu Lakshman Kirloskar	Trade and Industry	Maharashtra
1965		Mohan Singh Kohli	Sports	Delhi
1965		Pratap Chandra Lal	Civil Service	Punjab
1965		Mohammad Mujeeb	Literature and Education	Delhi
1965		Jayant Narlikar	Science and Engineering	Maharashtra
1965		Ramaswamy Rajaram	Civil Service	Tamil Nadu
1965		K. R. Ramanathan	Science and Engineering	Tamil Nadu
1965		Satyajit Ray	Arts	West Bengal
1965		Triguna Sen	Literature and Education	West Bengal
1965		Santu Shahaney	Civil Service	West Bengal
1965		Shiv Sharma	Medicine	Uttar Pradesh
1965		Harbaksh Singh	Civil Service	Delhi
1965		Vrindavan Lal Verma	Literature and Education	Uttar Pradesh
1965		Manikya Lal Verma	Social Work	Rajasthan
1966		T. S. Ramaswami Aiyer	Public Affairs	Tamil Nadu
1966		Babubhai Maneklal Chinai	Trade and Industry	Maharashtra
1966		Puliyur Krishnaswamy Duraiswami	Medicine	Delhi
1966		Verghese Kurien	Trade and Industry	Gujarat
1966		Zubin Mehta*	Arts	Canada
1966		K. P. Kesava Menon	Public Affairs	Kerala
1966		Bhabani Charan Mukharji	Civil Service	West Bengal
1966		Mannathu Padmanabha Pillai	Social Work	Kerala
1966		K. Shankar Pillai	Arts	Delhi
1966		Vikram Sarabhai	Science and Engineering	Gujarat
1966		Vinayak Sitaram Sarwate	Literature and Education	Madhya Pradesh
1966		Homi Sethna	Civil Service	Maharashtra
1966		Jodh Singh	Literature and Education	Punjab
1966		Haribhau Upadhyaya	Literature and Education	Uttar Pradesh
1967		Mulk Raj Anand	Literature and Education	Maharashtra
1967		Tara Cherian	Social Work	Tamil Nadu
1967		Mulk Raj Chopra	Civil Service	Uttar Pradesh
1967		Tulsi Das	Medicine	Punjab
1967		Krishna Kanta Handique	Literature and Education	Assam
1967		Akshay Kumar Jain	Literature and Education	Delhi
1967		Pupul Jayakar	Social Work	Delhi
1967		Ali Akbar Khan	Arts	West Bengal
1967		D. P. Kohli	Civil Service	Punjab
1967		Ramanathan Krishnan	Sports	Tamil Nadu
1967		C. Kottieth Lakshmanan	Medicine	Tamil Nadu
1967		T. M. Ponnambalam Mahadevan	Literature and Education	Tamil Nadu
1967		Kalyanji Vithalbhai Mehta	Literature and Education	Gujarat
1967		S. I. Padmavati	Medicine	Delhi
1967		Vasantrao Bandoji Patil	Trade and Industry	Maharashtra
1967		D. C. Pavate	Literature and Education	Karnataka
1967		Datto Vaman Potdar	Literature and Education	Maharashtra
1967		B. Shiva Rao	Literature and Education	Delhi
1967		Khwaja Ghulam Saiyidain	Literature and Education	Uttar Pradesh
1967		Ashok Kumar Sarkar	Literature and Education	West Bengal
1967		Mihir Sen	Sports	West Bengal
1967		Ravi Shankar	Arts	Uttar Pradesh
1967		Kaikhushru Ruttonji Shroff	Public Affairs	Maharashtra
1967		M. L. Vasanthakumari	Arts	Andhra Pradesh
1968		Acharya Vishva Bandhu	Literature and Education	Uttar Pradesh
1968		Prabhu Lal Bhatnagar	Science and Engineering	Karnataka
1968		Sudhir Ranjan Sengupta	Literature and Education	West Bengal
1968		Mary Clubwala Jadhav	Social Work	Maharashtra
1968		K. Shivaram Karanth (Note: K. Shivaram Karanth returned the award to protest against the Emergency declared in the country in 1975.)	Literature and Education	Karnataka
1968		Bismillah Khan	Arts	Uttar Pradesh
1968		Vishnu Sakharam Khandekar	Literature and Education	Maharashtra
1968		Sam Manekshaw	Civil Service	Maharashtra
1968		Mansukhlal Atmaram Master	Public Affairs	Maharashtra
1968		M. G. K. Menon	Medicine	Delhi
1968		Waman Bapuji Metre	Science and Engineering	Maharashtra
1968		Gujarmal Modi	Trade and Industry	Uttar Pradesh
1968		Murugappa Channaveerappa Modi	Medicine	Karnataka
1968		Gopalan Narasimhan	Literature and Education	Tamil Nadu
1968		Benjamin Peary Pal	Science and Engineering	Punjab
1968		Brahm Prakash	Science and Engineering	Punjab
1968		Manikonda Chalapathi Rau (Note: Manikonda Chalapathi Rau returned the award.)	Literature and Education	Andhra Pradesh
1968		C. R. Rao	Science and Engineering	Delhi (Note: C. R. Rao was accorded the citizenship of the United States in 1995.)
1968		Radhanath Rath	Literature and Education	Odisha
1968		Jyotish Chandra Ray	Medicine	West Bengal
1968		Mariadas Ruthnaswamy	Literature and Education	Tamil Nadu
1968		Raghupati Sahay	Literature and Education	Uttar Pradesh
1968		Shripad Damodar Satwalekar	Literature and Education	Maharashtra
1968		G. Sankara Kurup	Literature and Education	Kerala
1968		Periyasaamy Thooran	Literature and Education	Tamil Nadu
1968		Sarda Prasad Varma	Civil Service	Bihar
1968		Shamaprasad Rupshanker Vasavada	Social Work	Gujarat
1968		Mamidipudi Venkatarangayya	Literature and Education	Andhra Pradesh
1969		Tarasankar Bandyopadhyay	Literature and Education	West Bengal
1969		Krishna Chandar	Literature and Education	Maharashtra
1969		Rahim-ud-in Khan Dagar	Arts	Delhi
1969		Mohanlal Lallubhai Dantwala	Science and Engineering	Maharashtra
1969		Keshavrao Krishnarao Datey	Medicine	Maharashtra
1969		Keshav Prasad Goenka	Trade and Industry	West Bengal
1969		Semmangudi Srinivasa Iyer	Arts	Tamil Nadu
1969		Vithalbhai Jhaveri	Literature and Education	Maharashtra
1969		Prithviraj Kapoor	Arts	Punjab
1969		Kesarbai Kerkar	Arts	Maharashtra
1969		Krishna Ramchand Kriplani	Literature and Education	Delhi
1969		Adinath Lahiri	Science and Engineering	West Bengal
1969		Gobind Behari Lal*	Literature and Education	United States
1969		Kasturbhai Lalbhai	Trade and Industry	Gujarat
1969		Lata Mangeshkar	Arts	Maharashtra
1969		V. K. Narayana Menon	Science and Engineering	Kerala
1969		Raman Madhavan Nair	Literature and Education	Chandigarh
1969		Samad Yar Khan Saghar Nizami	Literature and Education	Uttar Pradesh
1969		Nanasaheb Parulekar	Literature and Education	Maharashtra
1969		Yashwant Dinkar Pendharkar	Literature and Education	Maharashtra
1969		Vitthal Laxman Phadke	Social Work	Gujarat
1969		Raja Rao*	Literature and Education	United States
1969		Niharranjan Ray	Literature and Education	West Bengal
1969		P. K. Sen	Medicine	Maharashtra
1969		Vallabhadas Vithaldas Shah	Medicine	Maharashtra
1969		Haroon Khan Sherwani	Literature and Education	Andhra Pradesh
1969		Kasturiswami Sreenivasan	Trade and Industry	Tamil Nadu
1969		Naval Tata	Social Work	Maharashtra
1969		S. S. Vasan	Arts	Tamil Nadu

== Explanatory notes ==
Non-citizen recipients
