= Chinmaya Vidyalayas =

School in Vasant Vihar

- Chinmaya Vidyalaya Emblem
- Formation: 1965
- Type: Group of Schools
- Purpose: To offer children a value-based and holistic education
- Headquarters: Coimbatore
- Location: India
- Region served: Mainly India. Also Trinidad
- Headed By: Swami Swaroopananda
- Director: Swamini Vimalananda
- Main organ: CCMT Education Cell
- Parent organisation: Chinmaya Mission
- Website: chinmayamission.com

Chinmaya Vidyalayas are a group of schools operated by the Central Chinmaya Mission Trust (CCMT), founded by Swami Chinmayananda and currently headed by Swami Tejomayananda. There are more than 80 Chinmaya Vidyalayas across 12 states in India and one in Trinidad that teach scriptures.

== CCMT Education Cell ==
The CCMT(Central Chinmaya Mission Trust) Education Cell is the governing body of the Chinmaya Education Movement. It is headquartered at Chinmaya Garden, Coimbatore, India. It was created to streamline and facilitate the efficient and effective maintenance and growth of all Chinmaya Educational Institutions.

== History ==
=== Founding ===
Swami Chinmayananda was on his first global tour. The queen of Vengunad, Radha Devi, was the president of Chinmaya Mission, Kollengode in Kerala. There was a request to start a school.

A part of the palace was offered and so the Chinmaya Education Movement (CEM) was started with the inauguration of a nursery school on 20 May 1965, with royal patronage by K.P.S. Menon (ex-ambassador to Russia). The Chinmaya nursery school grew and Swami Chinmayananda inaugurated the primary school on 17 June 1969, in a separate building near the palace. It has over time become a higher secondary school, with 555 students, a staff of 37, and structure and infrastructure.

=== Growth and controversies over the years ===
In 1966, Swami Chinmayananda first mentioned in a casual conversation that Chennai should have a Chinmaya Vidyalaya; the first of the seven Chinmaya Vidyalayas was inaugurated in October 1968 by the famous Bharatanatyam dancer Rukmini Devi Arundale. These Vidyalayas are considered amongst the best in this metropolitan city and are headed by Swami Tejomayananda who succeeded Swami Chinmayananda as the chancellor for all the Vidyalayas across Chennai and later India.

In the next 25 years (between mid-60 to 1980), 24 more Vidyalayas were established all over India, with 11 in Kerala, five Tamil Nadu, two each in Karnataka, Jharkhand and Odisha, one in Andhra Pradesh, and one in the metropolitan city of New Delhi.

Constructed in 1979, CV Delhi educated its first students in a small building, shifting later to its present site of nearly four acres in the sophisticated South Delhi suburb of Vasant Vihar. Swami Jyotirmayananda of Chinmaya Mission Delhi brought together man and material and forded through the political corridors of Delhi to give concrete shape to this Chinmaya Vidyalaya.

Between the years 1980 to 2013, more than 50 Vidyalayas were set up all over India. A notable one is the Chinmaya Hari Har Vidyalaya, Ellayapalle, in Andhra Pradesh. Started by Swamini Sharadapriyananda (a dynamic lawyer, Gandhian, and freedom-fighter turned sannyasin and one of the senior-most disciples of Swami Chinmayananda) her passion was to serve the poorest of poor, giving them material succor and spiritual solace. As of 2012 there were over 80 Chinmaya Vidyalayas with over 75,000 students all over India.

Although there were many notable achievements by Chinmaya Vidyalaya; they also had some reports of toxic behavior by students and verbally abusing by teachers and employees like Institutional Controversies: Chinmaya Vidyalaya Chinmaya Vidyalaya has faced severe reputational damage following high-profile cases of negligence and legal misconduct. The most notable incident occurred in Coimbatore (2021), where a 17-year-old student died by suicide after alleging sexual assault by a teacher. The school’s principal was arrested under the POCSO Act for failing to report the student's prior complaints, leading to allegations of a systemic cover-up and sparking national outrage over student safety. In New Delhi (2024), the Vasant Vihar branch faced a magisterial probe following the death of a 12-year-old student during a classroom scuffle. CCTV footage showed a lack of teacher supervision during the incident, leading to intense protests by parents regarding the school's safety protocols. Furthermore, the same branch was embroiled in a 2014 sexual harassment case where a teacher accused the principal and management of intimidation, raising questions about the school’s internal grievance mechanisms. These recurring issues of administrative negligence and failure to protect students and staff have significantly impacted the institution's public standing.

=== In Trinidad ===
Swami Chinmayananda first visited Trinidad in May 1965. A Chinmaya Mission centre was established by Swami Prakashananda (a native of Trinidad) in 1997. The first Chinmaya Vidyalaya outside India was inaugurated in 2003.
