= Kshama Metre =

Indian pediatrician (born 1950)

- Born: 25 June 1950; Nagpur, Maharashtra, India
- Occupations: Rural Development Leader, and Pediatrician
- Known for: Chinmaya Organization for Rural Development (CORD)
- Parent(s): Waman Bapuji Metre; Shantabai Metre
- Awards: Padma Shri; Guardian International Development Achievement Award; Nina Sibal Award; Sadguru Ganananda Award; National Women Commission Award; The Week Women of the Year; Ojaswani Shikhar Sewa Alankaran Award

Kshama Metre, popularly known as Doctor Didi, is an Indian rural development leader, and a pediatrician, who has led the Chinmaya Organization for Rural Development (CORD) since the founding of its predecessor organization in 1985, and she leads the organization as its National Director. The organization serves the rural areas of India with its unique approach for sustainable and comprehensive community driven integrated development program, under the aegis of the Chinmaya Mission. While holding the directorship of CORD India, she also serves as an adviser to CORD USA, the US wing of the Organization. A recipient of several awards including the Guardian International Development Achievement Award of 2012, she was selected as the Woman of the Year by The Week magazine, in 1993. The Government of India awarded her the fourth highest civilian honor of the Padma Shri, in 2008, for her contributions to society.

== Biography ==
All men consider their religion sacred and revere it. When all religions together endorse and validate the right to Paediatric Palliative Care of all eligible children, the impetus to the cause hitherto ignored to a large extent will be immense and will in due time bring about the desired structural changes in health policies and mandates of different counties nationally and internationally, says Kshama Metre.

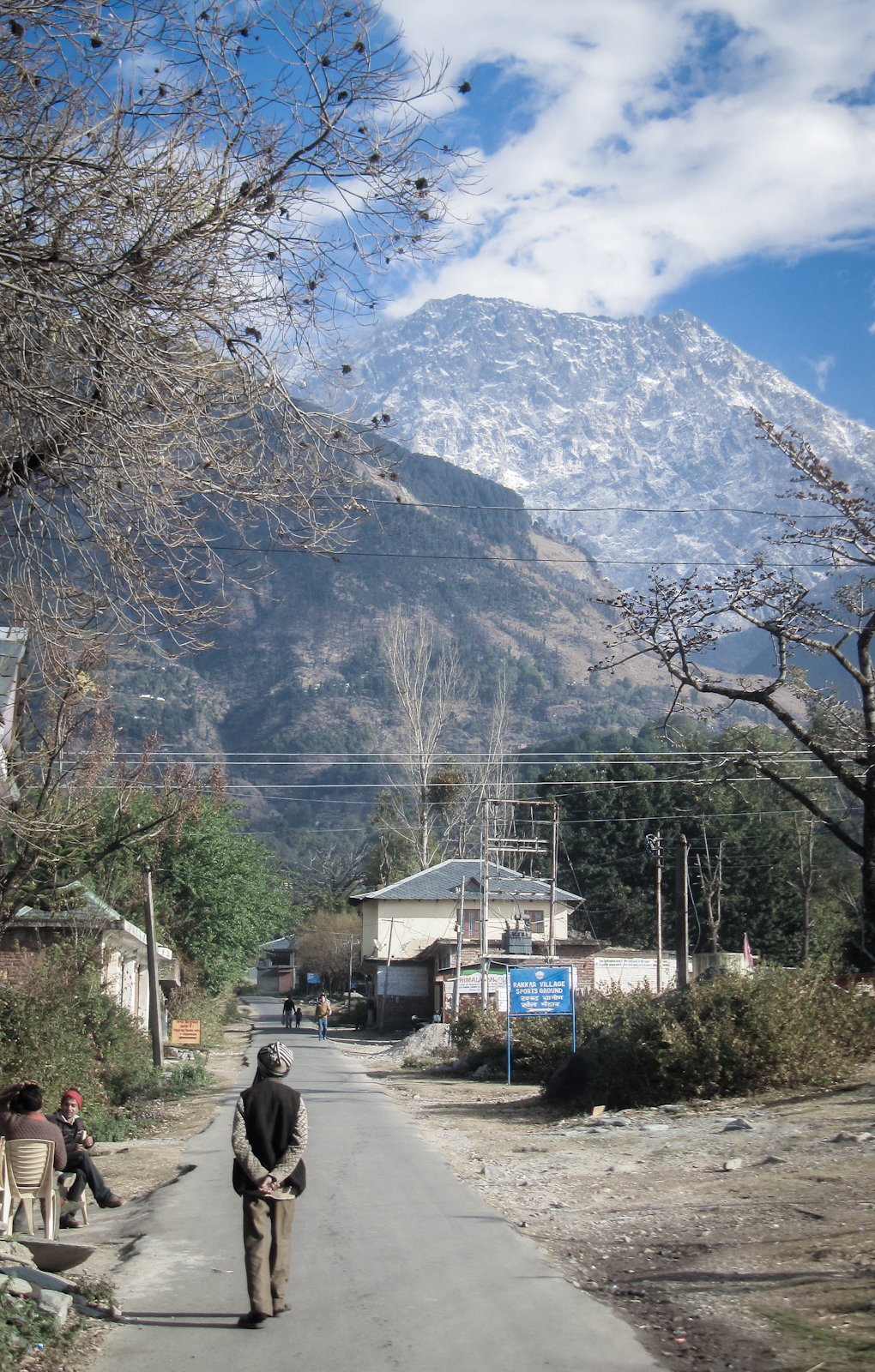
Sidhbari village, Himachal Pradesh

Metre was born on 25 June 1950 to geologist Wamanrao Bapuji Metre and Shantabai Metre at Nagpur in the western Indian state of Maharashtra but spent her early years in Assam. Moving to Delhi, she did her schooling at The Frank Anthony Public School before graduating in medicine (MBBS) from Maulana Azad Medical College and secured her post graduate degree (MD) in pediatrics from the same institution. Later, she did her senior residency at Lok Nayak Jai Prakash Narayan Hospital, Delhi and set up her practice in the city. It was during this time, she met Chinmayananda Saraswati, a spiritual leader and educationist; the meeting is reported to have influenced her to abandon medical practice and join the Chinmaya Mission to assist in their work in the rural areas of the country.

In 1985, leaving behind her life in New Delhi, she went to Sidhbari, a village in Himachal Pradesh, and set up six health centres for women and children and a community health training centre for nurses. The movement gathered momentum in due course and evolved into Chinmaya Organisation of Rural Development (CORD), with Metre becoming the founding National Director of the organization. Under her leadership, CORD operates in over 900 villages and has formed self-help groups (Mahila Mandals) and introduced microfinancing facilities through the groups.

In 2003, Chinmaya Mission's rural development activities were combined under the umbrella of CORD.

The organization has had a strong focus on Kangra district of Himachal Pradesh, where it started, along with some presence in the neighboring districts. To leverage its long term in-depth experience in its core area of operation, starting 2005, it expanded its activities with satellite units in the states of Odisha, Tamil Nadu, Andhra Pradesh, Punjab and Uttarakhand. She has also focused on social issues like HIV/AIDS, substance abuse and discriminative treatment of women and her efforts are reported behind setting up of social forums where law and order issues could be settled without the interference of Police.

Metre's activities have been supported by the National Bank for Agriculture and Rural Development (NABARD) which extended finance for the microfinancing of the Mahila Mandals. The system initiated by her covers 1490 self-help groups, 75 children's groups, 220 men's groups and several girls' groups and is active in community health programs, rehabilitation programs for disabled people, legal aid programs, and livelihood support programs. Her efforts gained her a nomination to the now defunct Planning Commission of India in 2007 for a five-year term that lasted till 2012 where she was a member of the work group which focused on primary healthcare. She has written several articles on rural healthcare and development; some of them getting accepted by Changemakers, a networking platform for social entrepreneurship.

Her group of volunteers have trained over 40,000 people in the management of rural development, representing government and banking institutions, non government organizations and self-help group (SHG) members. In 2015, with the increasing demand for such training, a new facility for CORD Training Center was opened in Sidhbari.

== Awards and honours ==
In 1993, The Week magazine selected Metre as the Woman of the Year. This was followed by Ojaswani Shikhar Sewa Alankaran Award of the Times Group in 2000, and the Women's Empowerment Award of the National Commission for Women in 2002. Two years later, Prophets of India, a 2004 publication, listed her as one of the protagonists and she received the Sadguru Ganananda Award for social service in 2005. She was awarded the Nina Sibal Award in 2006 by the All India Women's Education Fund Association (AIWEFA) for her leadership of CORD and the organization's contribution towards Integrated Community Based Rehabilitation work for differently abled person. The Government of India included her in the 2008 Republic Day honours list for the civilian award of the Padma Shri. The Guardian, the British national daily, chose her for the International Achievement Award in 2012, for her exceptional work to alleviate poverty in the developing world. In 2017, she was chosen for the Savitribai Jyotirao Phule award.

== See also ==
- The Frank Anthony Public School, New Delhi
