= Chinmayanand (disambiguation) =

Chinmayananda Saraswati, or Swami Chinmayananda (1916–1993), an Indian Hindu spiritual leader and teacher.

Chinmayanand may also refer to:

- Chinmayanand (politician), or Swami Chinmayanand, a former member of parliament in India
- Chinmaya Mission, religious organization founded by Chinmayananda Saraswati
