= Upanishad Ganga =

- Genre: Indian philosophy
- Created by: Chandraprakash Dwivedi
- Inspired by: Swami Chinmayananda Saraswati
- Developed by: Chinmaya Mission
- Directed by: Chandraprakash Dwivedi
- Opening theme: Hiranmayena Patrena
- Country of origin: India
- Original language: Hindi
- No. of seasons: 1
- No. of episodes: 52

Production
- Executive producer: Swami Tejomayananda Saraswati
- Producer: Chinmaya Mission
- Production location: Varanasi
- Running time: 45 minutes
- Production company: Chinmaya Mission
- Budget: 25 Crore INR

Original release
- Network: DD National
- Release: 11 March 2012 – 24 March 2013

Upanishad Ganga is an Indian television series based on the wisdom and knowledge of the ancient hindu text Upanishads. The 52 episode series was directed by Chandraprakash Dwivedi and produced by Chinmaya Mission with guidance by Swami Tejomayananda Saraswati. It aired on DD National from 11 March 2012 to 24 March 2013. It is the first ever series based on the Upanishads and dramatised its central teachings. The show explains the wisdom and knowledge of Indian philosophy in a very easy and simple manner. It is heavily inspired by the teachings of Swami Chinmayananda Saraswati. It gives a comparative study of Advaita Vedanta with other branches of Vedanta like Bhedabheda, Dvaitadvaita Vedanta, Dvaita Vedanta, Vishishtadvaita, Achintya Bheda Abheda and Shuddhadvaita.

== Plot ==
The series is set in modern day Varanasi, where a Sanskrit scholar and his playwright son stage theatrical renditions teachings of knowledge and wisdom of Upanishads and Indian philosophy. Each episode features a dramatisation of key figures such as Valmiki, Dara Shikoh, Ashtavakra, Mirabai, Nachiketa, Tulsidas, Eknath and Yajnavalkya tying ancient wisdom to relevant life lessons, to make knowledge and wisdom accessible to a modern audience.

== Episodes ==
The series comprises 52 episodes. It begins with foundational teachings and gradually unfolds through short dramatizations.

- Episodes 1–4: Introduction to Vedic concepts and self discovery.
- Episodes 5–22: Stories of Valmiki, Dara Shikoh, Ashtavakra.
- Episodes 23–42: Focusing on Tulsidas, Nachiketa, Yajnavalkya.
- Episodes 43–51: Practical spiritual applications via Meera Bai, Eknath.
- Episode 52: A finale centred on gratitude and reflection.

== Cast ==
The series had a large ensemble cast, each playing multiple roles over the course of the series. Abhimanyu Singh played 33 different roles.

- Abhimanyu Singh as Sutradhar
- Ravi Khanvilkar as Sutradhar
- Sandeep Mohan
- Auroshikha Dey
- Jaya Bhattacharya as Ratnavali and Jabala
- Mukesh Tiwari
- Rasika Dugal
- Vrajesh Hirjee as Ashtavakra
- Sai Deodhar
- Zakir Hussain
- Gagan Malik
- Manju Mugdale
- Vineet Kumar Singh
- Huma Qureshi as Wife of Yuvraj

== Production ==
The concept was conceived by Tejomayananda, the then head of Chinmaya Mission, and was produced at a cost of US $1.6 million, under the direction of Chandraprakash Dwivedi, known for his historical serial Chanakya. The screenplay was written jointly by Dwivedi and Farid Khan after four years of research with Chinmaya Mission. The series were shot over a period of four years and the production cost crossed over 25 crores, before being aired. At the time, it was one of the most expensive serials on television.

== Reception ==
According to Express News Asia admin, the series received widespread appreciation from the audience and was acclaimed. Hinduism Today described the series as highly professional, with excellent writing, staging, acting and cinematography.

== Distribution ==
In 2013, it was released as a Home video DVD series by Shemaroo Entertainment. Chinmaya Mission official YouTube channel also released a show playlist.

== Legacy ==
During the COVID-19 pandemic in 2020, it was re-aired by the DD Bharati & DD National channel of the state run Doordarshan. In January 2025, Chinmaya Mission and Sanatana Seva Sangham translated and released the series in Tamil, Telugu, Malayalam, Kannada, & English languages respectively.
