= Chinmaya Organization for Rural Development =

- Abbreviation: CORD
- Formation: 2003; 23 years ago
- Founder: Dr. Kshama Metre
- Website: www.chinmayamission.com/what-we-do/cord-chinmaya-organisation-for-rural-development/, cordusa.org

The Chinmaya Organization for Rural Development, known as CORD, is an organization that helps with rural development throughout India and South Asia. It is the service wing of Chinmaya Mission. CORD aims to promote sustainable development in India through activities such as empowering women, helping with microfinancing, and forming Mahila Mandals or self-help groups. Rather than just giving aid, CORD focuses on helping people by teaching them necessary skills to be self-sufficient and independent.

== History ==
The beginnings of CORD came from the service efforts of Dr. Kshama Metre, who worked as a doctor in India. Her experience with meeting Swami Chinmayananda inspired her to leave her medical practice and join the Chinmaya Mission to assist in their work in the rural areas of the country. Metre set up health centres for women and children in the village of Sidhbhari, Himachal Pradesh. In 2003, the service efforts of Chinmaya Mission were merged into the organization CORD, so CORD was born.
