= Prakashananda (Chinmaya Mission) =

Swami Prakashananda
- Born: California, Trinidad and Tobago
- Other name: Brahmachari Prem Chaitanya
- Known for: Chinmaya Mission

Swami Prakashananda (Sanskrit: स्वामी प्रकाशानंद:) is the founder and Acharya of Chinmaya Mission of Trinidad and Tobago.

== Background ==
Swami Prakashananda was born in California, Trinidad and Tobago. While studying for a bachelor's degree in political science and philosophy from York University in Toronto, he met Swami Chinmayananda during Chinmaya Mission's jnana yajna. He soon joined Chinmaya Mission started studying the scriptures at Mumbai in 1991.

Upon completion of his studies he was named Brahmachari Prem Chaitanya in 1994 and was assigned to give discourses at various Mission centers in India and Nepal. Prem returned to Trinidad in 1997 and started Chinmaya Mission Trinidad and Tobago on October 2nd 1997. Swami Tejomayananda initiated Premji into Sanyasa as Swami Prakashananda on Mahashivaratri in 2005.

In 2012, PrakashanandaJi was awarded the Chaconia Medal - Gold, the nation's second highest award, in recognition of long and meritorious service to promote national welfare or community spirit.

As of October 2025, Swami PrakashanandaJi has conducted four residential Vedanta Courses at Chinmaya Mission Trinidad and Tobago, guiding students through the sacred Vedic scriptures, in a traditional Gurukul setting.

Swami Prakashananda travels extensively in Trinidad, the Caribbean, the U.S., Canada, and the United Kingdom for spiritual discourses. His itinerary is available online.
