= Swami Prakashananda =

Swami Prakashananda may refer to:

- Swami Prakashananda (Chinmaya Mission), Acharya of Chinmaya Mission of Trinidad and Tobago
- Swami Prakashananda (Sushil Maharaj) (1874–1927), monk of the Ramakrishna Order
