= Ramanlal =

Ramanlal is a given name and middle name. People with the name include:

- Ramanlal Patkar
- Ramanlal Vora
- Ramanlal Gokaldas Saraiya
- Ramanlal Joshi
- Ramanlal Soni
- Ramanlal Maneklal Kantawala
- Ramanlal C. Mehta
- Ramanlal Nilkanth Hasya Paritoshik
- Ketan Ramanlal Bulsara
- Jitendrakumar Ramanlal Patel
- Akshay Ramanlal Desai

== See also ==
- Meanings of minor-planet names: 20001–21000#m837, for 20837 Ramanlal
