= Niranjan Das Gulhati =

Indian civil engineer

- Born: 4 November 1904; India
- Died: India
- Occupations: Civil engineer Water resources consultant Writer
- Known for: Indus Waters Treaty
- Spouse: Shakuntala
- Children: 3
- Awards: Padma Bhushan

Niranjan Das Gulhati was an Indian civil engineer, water resources consultant and writer, known for his mediation in the Indus Waters Treaty of 1960 between India and Pakistan. His contributions were reported in the formation of the International Commission on Irrigation and Drainage (ICID), a non governmental organization that promotes transfer of water sharing technologies between countries.

== Early life and education ==
An Alumnus of the Thomason College of Engineering (present-day Indian Institute of Technology, Roorkee), he was associated with the World Bank, International Development Association and United Nations Economic and Social Commission for Asia and the Pacific. He was the author of two books, Indus Waters Treaty: An Exercise in International Mediation and Data Of High Dams In India. The Government of India awarded him the third highest civilian honour of the Padma Bhushan, in 1961, for his contributions to society.

His life story has been documented in a book, The Untiring Indian - Lifestory of Mr. N. D. Gulhati - A Visionary Water Resources Engineer, published in 2011. The International Commission on Irrigation and Drainage has instituted an annual oration, N.D. Gulhati Memorial Lecture for International Cooperation in Irrigation and Drainage in his honor.

== See also ==
- Indus Waters Treaty
- International Commission on Irrigation and Drainage
