= Didi Contractor =

American architect (1929–2021)

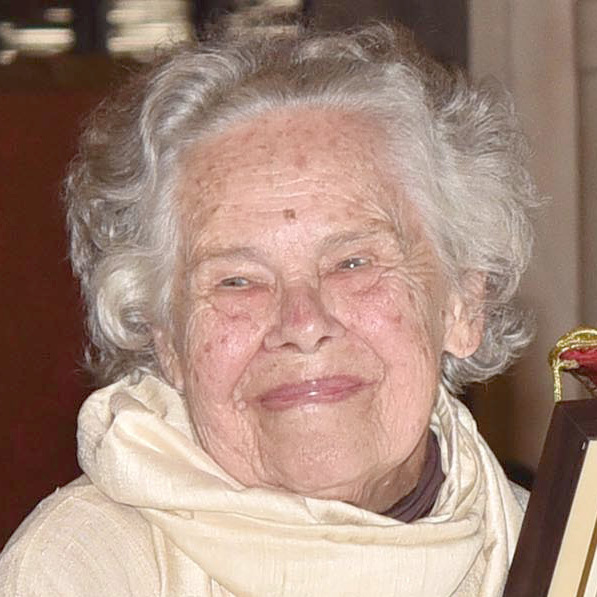
- Contractor in 2019
- Born: Delia Kinzinger; October 11, 1929; Minneapolis, Minnesota, U.S.
- Died: July 5, 2021 (aged 91); Sidhbari, India
- Education: University of Colorado Boulder & self-taught Architect and natural builder
- Occupation: Natural builder
- Known for: Sustainable building in India
- Spouse: Narayan Contractor
- Children: Maya Narayan, Devendra Contractor, late Rahoul Contractor, Kirin Narayan
- Parent(s): Edmund & Alice Fish Kinzinger

Delia Narayan "Didi" Contractor (née Kinzinger; 1929 – July 5, 2021) was an American artist and builder. A self-taught architect, she is known for her work on the vernacular traditions in India, using adobe, bamboo and stone for materials. She was a recipient of the Nari Shakti Puraskar, India's highest civilian award for recognising the achievements and contributions of women.

== Life ==
Born Delia Kinzinger in Minneapolis, she was the daughter of expressionist painters Edmund Kinzinger and Alice Fish Kinzinger, both associated with the Bauhaus movement. Her father was German, from Pforzheim, Grand Duchy of Baden. Her mother was American. Her parents married in Germany in 1927, and moved to Minneapolis where her father worked as an exchange teacher. They returned to Germany, but left it for Paris in 1933. They moved to Waco, Texas in 1935, where her father was first assistant professor, later professor and finally head of the Art Department of Baylor University.

She grew up in New Mexico and Texas, and took a year off from school to work in theatre, She was first trained in art by her father and Hans Hofmann in New York, and then studied art at the University of Colorado Boulder, where she met her husband, Narayan Contractor. They moved to Nashik in the 1950s, and to Mumbai in the 1960s, raising four children. After separating from her husband she moved to Andretta, an artists’ village established by Norah Richards in the Kangra Valley of Himachal Pradesh in the 1970s.

Contractor's eldest daughter, Maya Narayan is a retired clinical psychologist. Over the years she has cared a lot for her mother. Contractor's youngest daughter is author and academic Kirin Narayan. Narayan has written about the Contractor household in Mumbai, in a beachside compound in Juhu which Contractor ran as a combination youth hostel and literary salon, in her memoir My Family and Other Saints. Her son Devendra Contractor trained as an architect and practices in Santa Fe, New Mexico. The children studied in the U.S.

Contractor died at home in Sidhbari on July 5, 2021, at age 91.

== Buildings ==
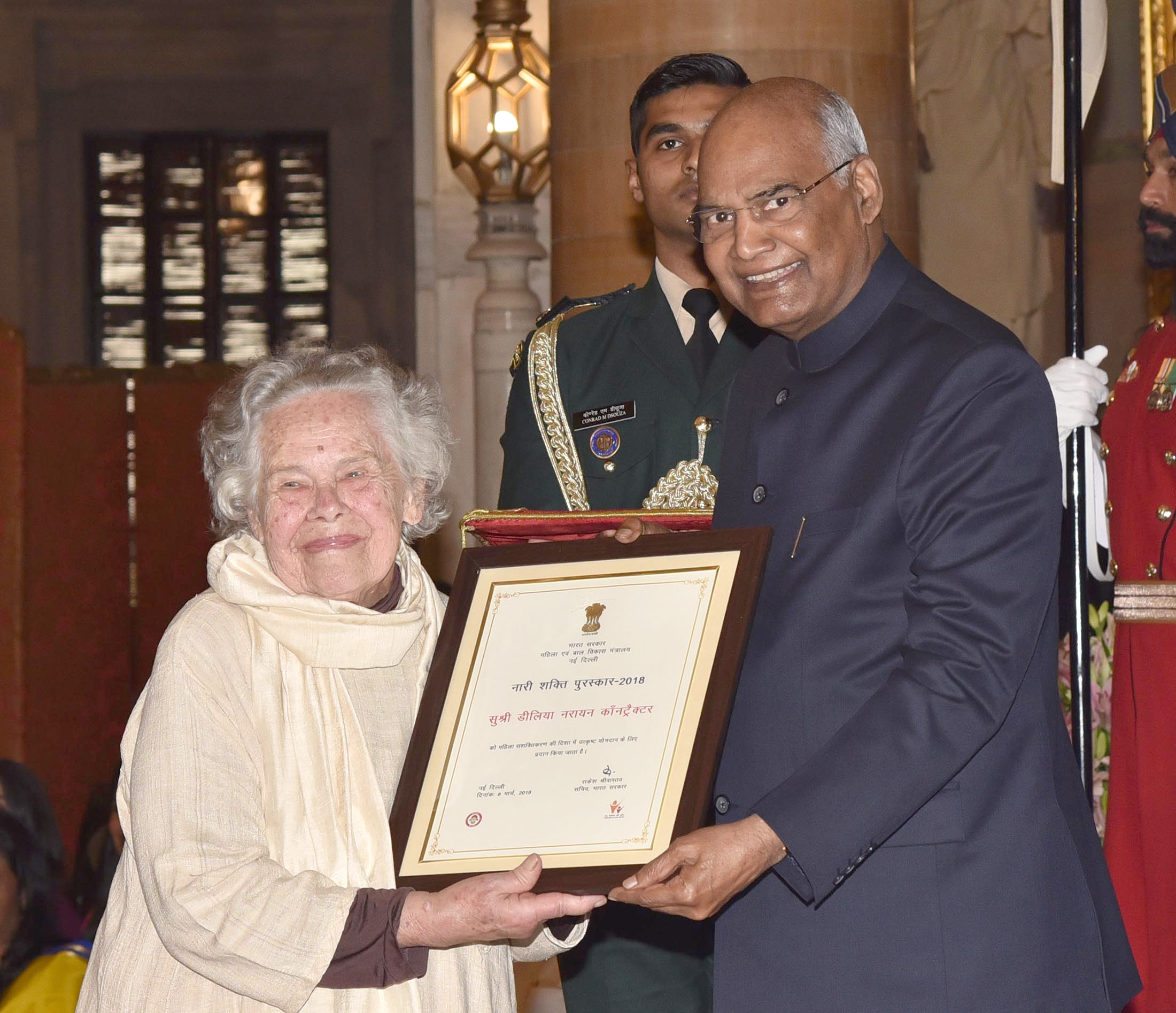
President Ram Nath Kovind presenting the Nari Shakti Puruskar to Didi Contractor in 2019

Contractor was self-taught in architecture and was inspired as a child by a talk by Frank Lloyd Wright. She specialised in buildings that fit into, rather than contrast with, the landscape, and are made of natural local materials: mainly mud, bamboo, and stone, with small amounts of deodar wood. They also include frequent use of staircases as a design element. They can be found in the area around Dharamsala, and include over 15 homes and three institutions, including the Nishtha Rural Health, Education and Environment Center in Sidhbari, the Sambhaavnaa Institute of Public Policy and Politics in Palampur, and the Dharmalaya Institute in Bir.

Contractor developed some of her construction methods after studying the use of sun-dried mud bricks, bamboo and slate in Andretta during the 1970s. For a community clinic begun in 1995, she experimented with rice husk and pine in mud plaster to improve insulation and reused discarded tyres inside earth berms. These methods formed part of the low-waste approach associated with her buildings. Accounts of her institutional projects have also noted their social and economic purposes and her efforts to pass locally based construction knowledge to younger builders.

== Recognition ==
Contractor was the subject of two feature films, Earth Crusader (2016), and Didi Contractor: Marrying the Earth to the Building (2017). She was the 2017 winner of the Women Artists, Architects and Designers (WADe) Asia Life Time Achievement Award.

In 2019 the president of India gave her the Nari Shakti Puraskar, India's highest civilian award for recognising the achievements and contributions of women.
