= Sidhbari =

- Suburb
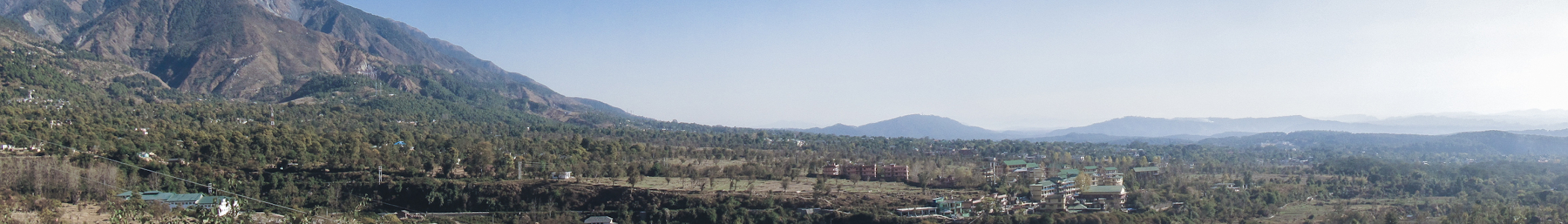
- Overview of Sidhbari and Fatehpur in the Kangra Valley

- Location in Himachal Pradesh, India Sidhbari (India)
- Coordinates: 32.1793901°N 76.3779831°E
- Country: India
- State: Himachal Pradesh
- District: Kangra

Languages
  - Official: Hindi
  - Regional: Pahari
- Time zone: UTC+5:30 (IST)

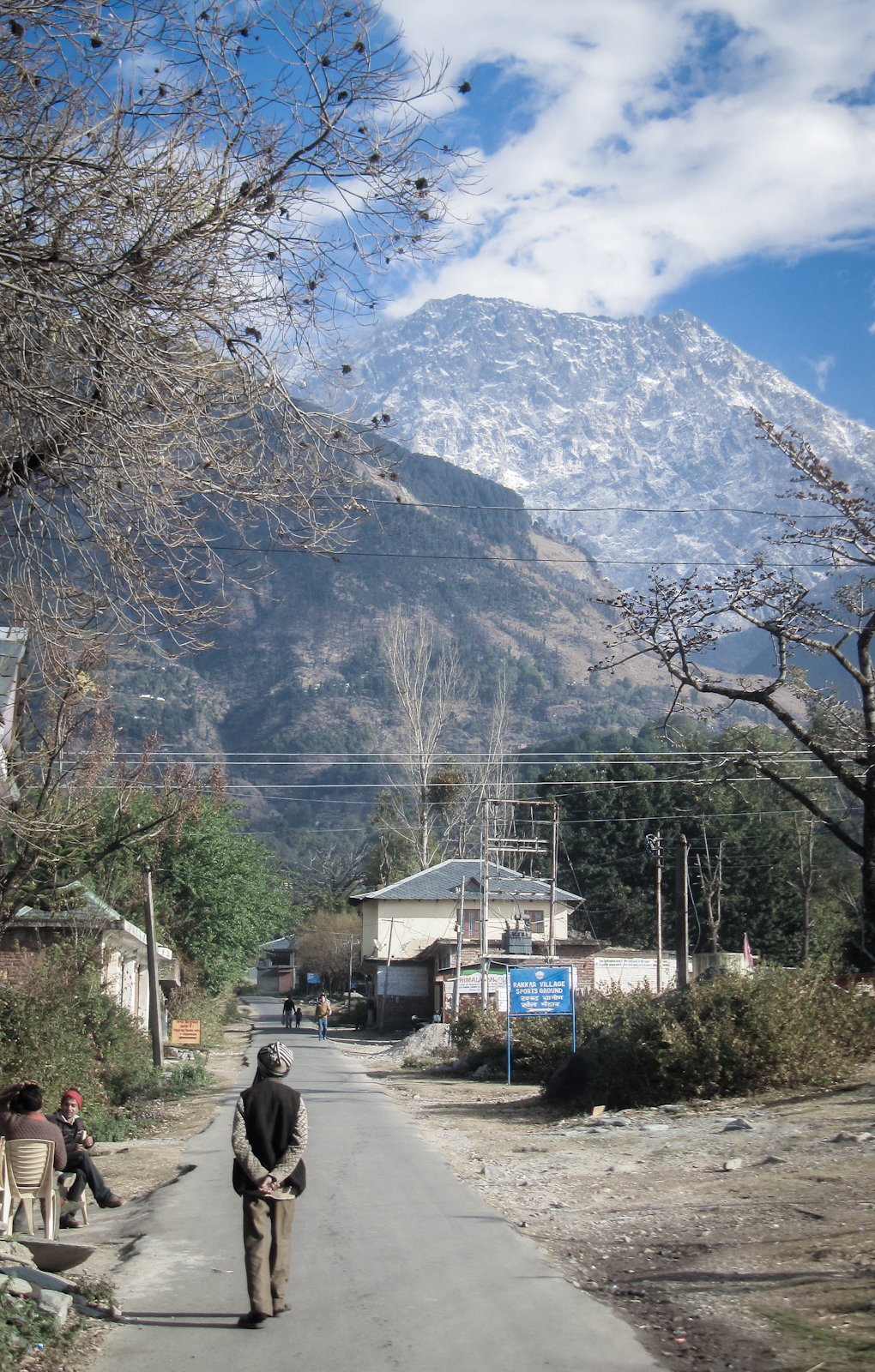
A view of the Dhauladhars from Rakkar, Upper Sidhbari

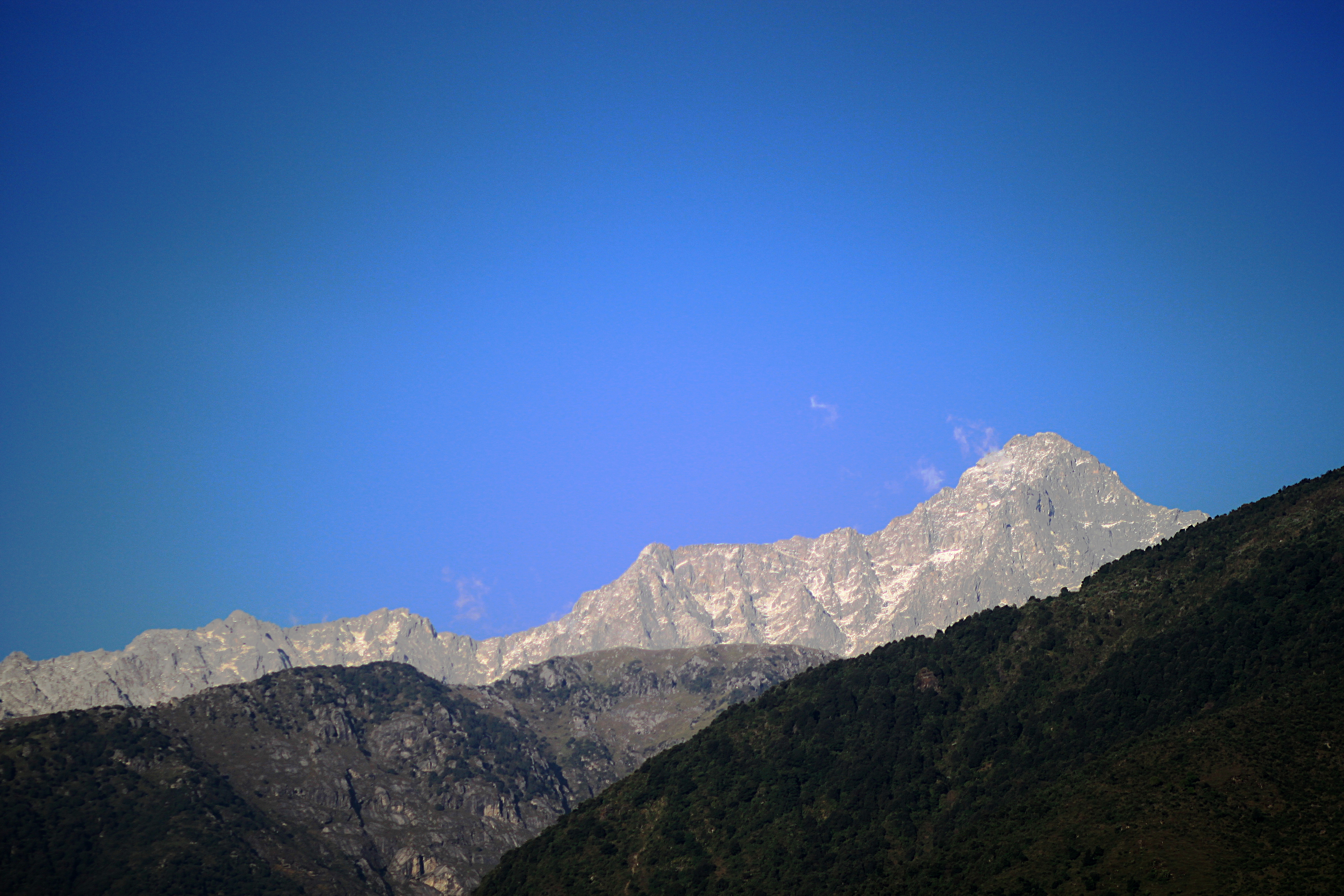
Another view of the Dhauladhars from Rakkar, Upper Sidhbari

Sidhbari is a suburb of Dharamshala town, situated in the foothills of Dhauladhar mountains, in Kangra district of the state of Himachal Pradesh, India. The Samadhi (final resting place) of Sri Chinmayananda is located here.

== Overview ==
Sidhbari derives its name from a sage, Baba Sidh. Locals believe that the dhuni (burning piece of wood) here has been burning for centuries and has never been extinguished even once. Hence the vibhuti (ash) is said to have the sacred blessings of the Sidh Baba.

Since 2000, Sidhbari has also been associated as the temporary residence of the Karmapa (Ogyen Trinley Dorje). The place is called Gyuto Monastery and is believed to be a teaching place for tantra vidya.

Himachal Pradesh Vidhan Sabha is also situated here.

== Places of interest ==
The small town of Sidhbari is bustling with activity due to several local attractions.

- Very near to the village is Chinmaya Ashram or Sandeepany Himalayas. In this Ashram is the Samadhi (resting place) of Pujya Gurudev Swami Chinmayananda, founder of Chinmaya Mission.
- In the village of Sidhbari, near Dharamshala in Himachal Pradesh, lies what is commonly regarded as the meditation spot of Kapila. The sage who lived there is locally regarded as Sidh Baba due to his mystic powers, and hence the name of the village Sidhbari.
- Sidhbari is also the temporary residence of the Tibetan buddhist leader 17th Karmapa(Ogyen Trinley Dorje), at Gyuto Monastery. Sidhbari is about six kilometers from Dharamshala, and about 15 kilometers from McLeod Ganj, where the 14th Dalai Lama lives.
- One attraction for tourists in Sidhbari is the Naam Art Gallery, exhibiting paintings by European artists Elsbeth Buschmann and Alfred W. Hallett.
- Another attraction is the earthen architectural works of Didi Contractor, including several homes made of adobe and bamboo.
- Vidhan Sabha: The winter session of assembly meetings happen here in Sidhbari.
- The hamlets of Rakkar and Sokni Da Kot in Upper Sidhbari is inhabited by the Gaddi community and offers visitors authentic homestay options in traditional mud houses.
- The Manuni Nallah flows through Sidhbari and is revered as a holy stream with various temples along the riverbank. The Aganjar Mahadev Temple at Khaniyara is the most famous and is located at Khaniyara, 2 km from Sidhbari.
- Nishtha – Rural Health, Education and Environment Center.

== See also ==
- McLeod Ganj
- Dharamshala
- Dharamkot
- Dhanotu
