= Ira Singhal =

Indian civil servant

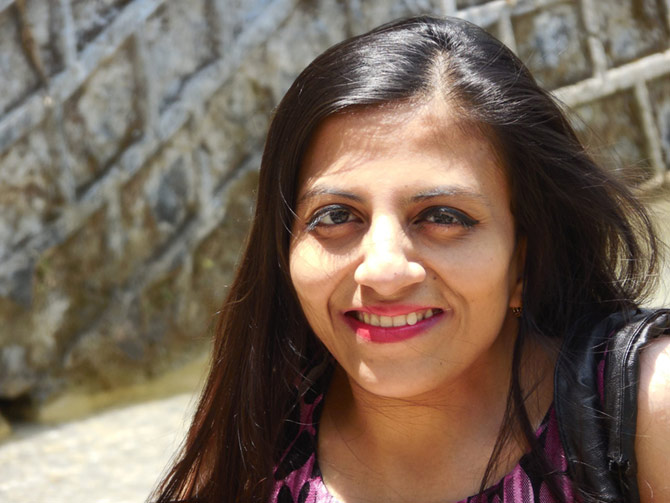

Assistant Collector Government of Delhi
- In office June 2016 – Present

Personal details
- Born: 31 August 1983 (age 43) Meerut, India
- Education: BE, MBA
- Alma mater: Netaji Subhas University of Technology; University of Delhi
- Occupation: IAS
- Known for: All India Topper in CSE 2014
- Employer: Government of India
- Organization: Government of Delhi

Ira Singhal is an Indian Administrative Service officer and computer science engineer. She was the highest-scoring individual in the UPSC's Civil Services Examination for the year 2014. She completed her BE from Netaji Subhas Institute of Technology, University of Delhi and MBA from FMS, University of Delhi. Singhal topped the exam in her fourth attempt, to become the first disabled woman to top the civil services exam.

== Early life and education ==
Singhal was born in Meerut to Rajendra Singhal and Anita Singhal. Her father is an engineer and mother is an insurance advisor. She was among the toppers at Sophia Girls School, Meerut and Loreto Convent School, Delhi.

Ira has scoliosis, a spine-related disorder, which disrupts her arm movement. She completed her schooling from the Army Public School, Dhaula Kuan and studied BE in Computer Engineering from Netaji Subhas Institute of Technology (now Netaji Subhas University of Technology) and received Dual MBA in Marketing & Finance from Faculty of Management Studies, University of Delhi. She scored 1,082 marks out of a total 2,025 and secured 53.43% in UPSC Exam 2014–2015.

== Career ==
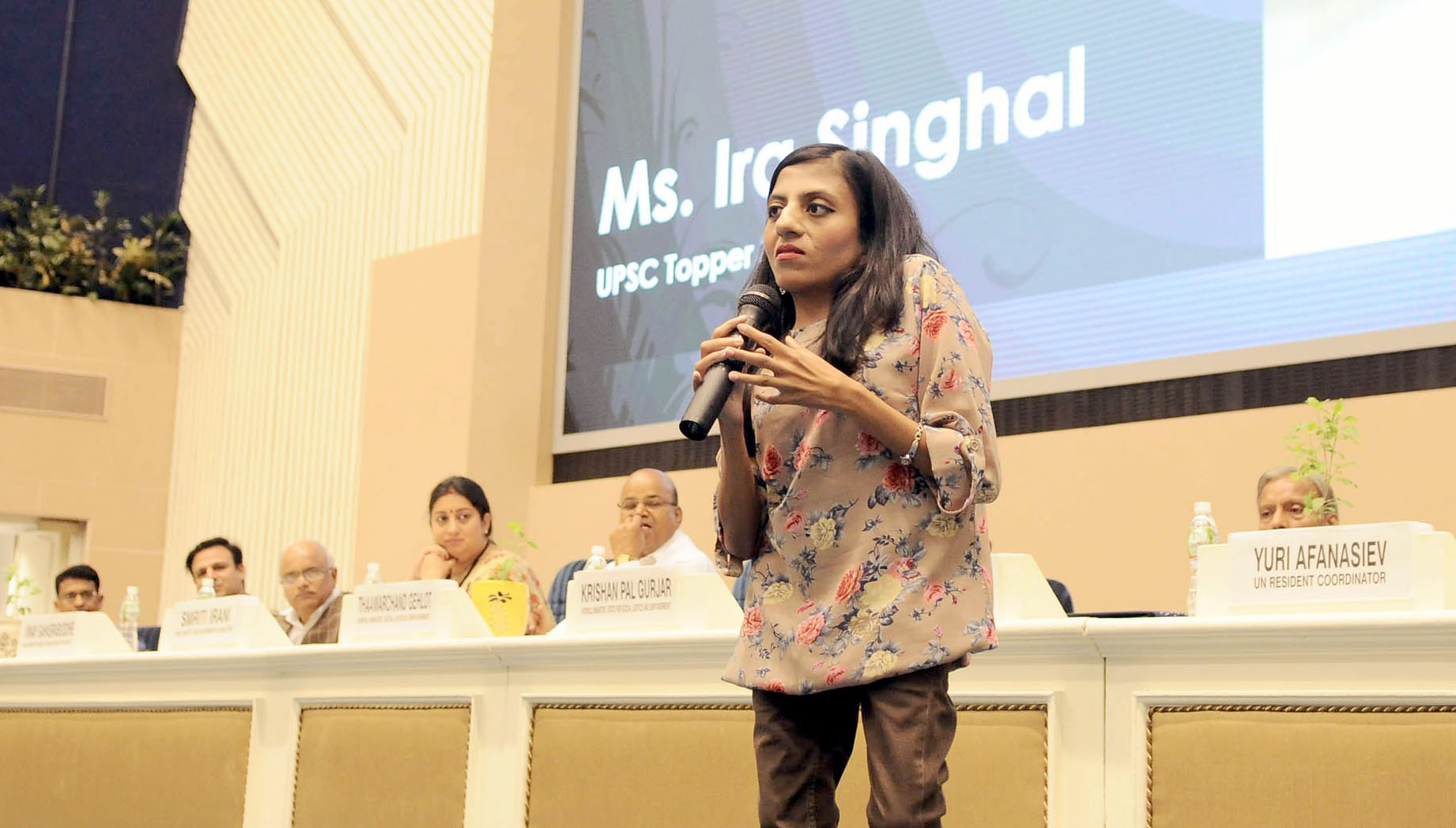
Singhal addressing the 2017 Inclusive India Summit

Despite clearing the exam in her very first attempt, Singhal was not allowed to take the position in office due to her physical disability as authorities cited her inability to push, pull and lift. She was refused a posting because she has scoliosis. In 2012 she filed a case in the Central Administrative Tribunal (CAT) and won after four years, after which she was given a posting as Assistant Commissioner in Indian Revenue Service (C&CE). Singhal gave the civil service examination in 2010, 2011, 2013 and 2014 and in the first three attempts she got Indian Revenue Service whereas in 2015 she got Indian Administrative Service (IAS).

After MBA, before appearing for Civil Services Examination in 2010, she worked as a Strategy Manager in Cadbury India and as marketing intern at the Coca-Cola Company. She has also taught Spanish for a year. She is posted as Assistant Collector (trainee) in the Government of Delhi since June 2016.

She is the Brand Ambassador for Department of Disability, Ministry of Social Justice and Empowerment, Government of India. She is also one of the brand ambassadors for Ministry of Women and Child Development & NITI Aayog and is on the National Panel for Accessible Elections, Election Commission of India. She has also been a part of the Designing of Central Board of Secondary Education (CBSE) Examination Policy with regard to children with disabilities. Her awards include India Today’s Woman of the Year 2015, President's Gold Medal for Topping the IAS Training, First Ladies of India Award by the Ministry of Women and Child Development, Government of India. She rescued around 340 child and bonded labourers and restored them to their families, within 1 year in her first posting as SDM (Sub-Divisional Magistrate), Alipur in North Delhi district. She is also the first person to give a job to a transgender person full-time employment in a government office in Delhi.

She is currently serving as Special Secretary, Education, in Arunachal Pradesh.
