= Jaiveer Shergill =

Indian lawyer and politician (born 1983)

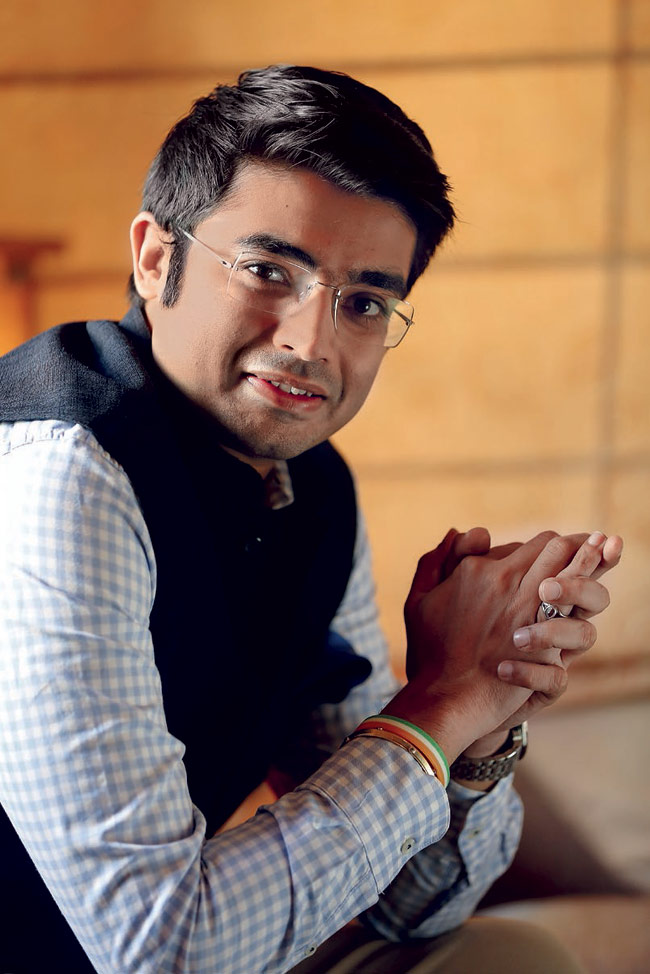
- Jaiveer Shergill in 2015

National Spokesperson of Bharatiya Janata Party
- In office 2022

Personal details
- Born: 28 June 1983 (age 43) Jalandhar, Punjab, India
- Party: Indian National Congress (2012-2022); Bharatiya Janata Party (2022-present)
- Spouse: Divyata Shergill
- Education: West Bengal National University of Juridical Sciences; University of California, Berkeley, (LLM)
- Occupation: National Spokesperson of Bharatiya Janata Party; Lawyer Supreme Court of India
- Website: jaiveershergill.com

Jaiveer Shergill (born 28 June 1983) is a practising lawyer in the Supreme Court of India and a politician. Since December 2022, Shergill has been the national spokesperson of the Bharatiya Janata Party. Before that, he was in the same position in Congress.

A graduate in law from UC Berkeley School of Law, Shergill has been writing regularly on national and international socio-political issues, and represented India as one of the 25 Munich Young Leaders at the Munich Security Conference in 2018.

Earlier, Shergill started his political career with the Indian National Congress in 2012, and became one of its youngest spokesperson before quitting the party in August 2022.

== Education and personal life ==
Jaiveer was born in Jalandhar, Punjab, to Rajeshwar Singh Shergill and Karamjeet Shergill. His father has been a prominent lawyer who specialises in cases relating to money laundering. Shergill did his schooling in Punjab, studying at St. Joseph's Boys School, Jalandhar, and APJ School, Jalandhar.

Coming from a lawyer family, Shergill enrolled to study law at the West Bengal National University of Juridical Sciences (Kolkata), graduating in 2006 with a bachelor's degree in law. During his stint at the law school, Jaiveer participated in various extra-curricular activities, and was elected President of the Student Union. After practicing law for a few years in Delhi, Jaiveer went to the UC Berkeley School of Law, University of California, United States, and did a master's degree in law.

== Legal career ==
In 2006, after graduating from law school, Jaiveer enrolled in the Delhi Bar and began his career as a law associate with "Economic Laws Practice," a reputed law firm specialising in tax and commercial cases. In 2008, Jaiveer was accepted into the Chambers of Abhishek Singhvi, who is a Senior Advocate, a Rajya Sabha MP, and a spokesman of the Indian National Congress party.

As a practising advocate at the Supreme Court of India, Jaiveer has been involved in various high-profile cases. He has been on the panel of lawyers representing Vodafone India in its celebrated case against the Income Tax department, (highest tax liability of US$2.2 billion), where the company refused to pay a tax demand of Rs. 2000 crore (US$330 million), insisting that the transaction of shares in an overseas tax haven, (Mauritius), had the effect of transferring (i.e. selling) all its assets in India from one party to another, with absolutely no tax liability in India on the sale, whether of sales tax or capital gains tax or any other tax.

Shergill served as the Young India representative for the International Bar Association, one of the most prestigious lawyer organisations in the world, for a period of two years (2008–09).

Jaiveer has also represented one of the two sides in a controversial dispute regarding the offering of prayers at a site claimed by two religious communities in Karnataka state. Recently, Jaiveer represented the new airline venture Vistara, a joint venture of the Tata group and Singapore Airlines, in the Supreme Court and the Delhi High Court in a petition challenging the entry of foreign airlines into India. He also has a client base spanning India, Dubai, Australia and USA.

== Political career ==
Shergill started his political career with the Indian National Congress in 2012. He was among the youngest national Media panelist of the Indian National Congress. He was also one of the youngest spokespersons of the Congress Party for Punjab (Punjab Pradesh Congress Committee) and also the youngest person to be appointed as the co-chairman of the Congress Legal Cell for Punjab. Jaiveer was instrumental in voicing various economic and social issues in the media including but not limited to foreign direct investment, depleted conditions of schools in Punjab, alarming drug use, women safety etc.

In 2018, Jaiveer was named as one of the 25 Munich Young Leaders to take part in the Munich Security Conference in Germany to discuss international security issues, including the resurgence of Taliban in Afghanistan, the nuclear flashpoint between the US and North Korea, and China's growing presence in the Indo-Pacific

In 2022, several Punjab Congress leaders, including former Chief Minister Captain Amarinder Singh and former Punjab party chief Sunil Jakhar left the Indian National Congress and joined the BJP, and subsequently Jaiveer Shergill also resigned from the Congress party in August 2022, alleging sycophancy in the party.

Shergill joined BJP on 2 December 2022, and was made its national spokesperson. After attending the 2023 BJP National Executive meet, Shergill said that the professionalism in BJP was in stark contrast to the feudal, “high command” culture in the Congress party; and noted that "focus on organizational strength, communication, and awareness, along with the commitment to deliver, has undoubtedly made PM Modi the people's No. 1 choice for good governance"
