= Kirin Narayan =

Indian-born US anthropologist & writer

Kirin Narayan (born November 1959) is an Indian-born American anthropologist, folklorist and writer.

== Early life, education, and career ==
Narayan is the daughter of Narayan Ramji Contractor, a civil engineer from Nashik, and Didi Kinzinger, a German-American "artist, decorator, and builder of sustainable housing". Narayan was born in Bombay, attended school in India and came to the United States in 1976.

Narayan received a BA in creative writing from Sarah Lawrence College and went on to post-graduate studies in anthropology at the University of California, Berkeley, receiving her PhD in 1987. She taught anthropology and South Asian studies at the University of Wisconsin–Madison. In 1993 she was named a Guggenheim Fellow in the field of anthropology and cultural studies. She is a professor in the College of Asia and the Pacific at the Australian National University.

== Books ==
In 1989, Narayan published Storytellers, Saints, and Scoundrels: Folk Narrative in Hindu Religious Teaching. It received the Victor Turner Prize from the Society for Humanistic Anthropology and was co-winner of the Elsie Clews Prize for Folklore from the American Folklore Society.

In 1994, she published the novel Love, Stars and All That. Reviewing the novel, Indian poet and editor Dom Moraes praised the work, saying:

"This is a novel well received and achieved: it is also intelligent, excellently written, and revelatory of what it is like to be an American born in India. It makes one feel Narayan is that very rare bird, a born writer, and that she may fly far."

Narayan published Mondays on the Dark Night of the Moon: Himalayan Foothill Folktales in 1997. In 2002 a new edition of the first collection of Indian folk tales in English, Mary Frere's Old Deccan Days, was published with an introduction by Narayan. In 2007, she published a memoir My Family and Other Saints. An autobiographical work in which "Gods, gurus and eccentric relatives compete for primacy", The New York Times described the work as an "enchanting memoir". Its title is a reference to Gerald Durrell's My Family and Other Animals, a childhood inspiration to Narayan.

In her 2012 work Alive in the Writing: Crafting Ethnography in the Company of Chekhov, Narayan used Anton Chekhov's Sakhalin Island as inspiration for an exploration of ethnographic writing. James Wood, writing of his 'Books of the Year' in The New Yorker, described it as a "brief and brilliant book" that he read "with huge pleasure". In 2016 Narayan published Everyday Creativity: Singing Goddesses in the Himalayan Foothills, about women's traditions of singing in the Kangra Valley.

In 2024, Narayan published Cave of My Ancestors: Vishwakarma and the Artisans of Ellora.
