= Waman Bapuji Metre =

Indian geologist (1906–1970)

Waman "Dādā" Bapuji Metre (14 February 1906 – 21 November 1970) was the doyen of Indian petroleum geologists. He was awarded India's third-highest civilian award, the Padma Bhushan in 1968, for his contribution to petroleum exploration and development in India and for his 'significant contribution to the growth of the oil industry in the country'.

Resident of Kalamb

Padmabhushan Wamanrao Bapuji Metre is originally a resident of Kalamb and his family still lives in Kalamb, district- Yavatmal, Maharashtra state, Pin code 445401. Kalamb is the taluka place and is 21 kilometers from the district headquarters Yavatmal on Nagpur road and 130 kilometers from Nagpur on Yavatmal road. In this same Kalamb village, Padmabhushan Wamanrao Bapuji Metre completed his education up to class VII in the Zilla Parishad Kendra School, Kalamb.

== Biography ==
Metre was born on 14 February 1906, in Kalamb, Yavatmal, Maharashtra, India. He graduated from Indian School of Mines, Dhanbad in 1930. He joined Assam Oil Company (AOC) in Digboi, Assam, in 1930 and was the first Indian Geologist to head its exploration activity. After Burmah Oil, the parent of AOC, formed Oil India as a joint venture with the Government of India, he moved to New Delhi in 1961 as its Chief Technical Advisor and was concurrently Member (part-time), Oil and Natural Gas Commission (ONGC)

He was elected to the membership of Indian National Science Academy (INSA) in 1956. He was a fellow of Geological Society of London, and served as the President (Geology section) of the 1961 Indian Science Congress Association.

Kshama Metre, Indian rural development leader and pediatrician, is his daughter. Since she also won a Padma award, the two represent a very rare case of Padma award conferred to a father and daughter. List_of_parents-children_who_won_Padma_awards

== See also ==
- List of Padma Bhushan award recipients (1960–1969)
