= V. Ishwaraiah =

Indian pharmacologist (1898–1983)

- Born: 1898
- Died: 1983 (aged 84–85)
- Education: Andhra University
- Scientific career
- Fields: Pharmacology and Therapeutics
- Workplaces: Andhra Medical College, Madras Medical College and Stanley Medical College

V. Ishwaraiah MBBS, MRCP, FRFPS (1898–1983) was an Indian pharmacologist.

He received his M.R.C.P (Edin) with Pharmacology as special subject and F.R.F.P.S (Glasgow). He worked as lecturer in pharmacology, Andhra Medical College to succeed Dr. B. B. Dikshit (later the Director of AIIMS). He was promoted as Professor in 1943. He was transferred to Madras as Professor of Pharmacology for both Madras Medical College and Stanley Medical College.

He was very insistent that Pharmacologists be involved in Therapeutics (Clinics). He was instrumental in introducing M.D. in Pharmacology and Therapeutics in Andhra University with two examiners in Pharmacology and two in Medicine with a Practicals in Pharmacology and Clinical examination in Medicine. During that period, Professors of Pharmacology like Dr. Hardikar and Dr. M.Y. Ansari at Hyderabad and Dr. Ojha at Cuttack had clinical wards under their control. Dr. R.N. Chopra and his successors at the Calcutta School of Tropical Medicine had clinical responsibilities for Research.

He was one of the authors of Textbook of Pharmacology and Pharmacotherapeutics by David JC, Ishwaraiah V and Guruswami MN in 1972.

== Publications ==
- Study of a Group of Synthetic 3-Methyl Iso-quinilones for Their Spasmolytic Properties—V.Ishwaraiah and V.S.Venkatasubbu, Indian Academy of Sciences, 1952. 20: 131–133.
- An experimental investigation into the action of Indian cobra (Naja-naja triperdians). Chopra, R. N., and Ishwariah, V. Indian J. Med. Sciences. 1931. 18:1113-1125.
- Thiodicarb, 97-week dietary carcinogenicity study in mice with 52 week interim kill. Atkinson, C., Perry, C., Hudson, P., Snodgrass, E. & Ishwariah, V. (1993) Unpublished report no. IRI 7749 Project No. 439056 from Inveresk Research International. Submitted to WHO by Rhone-Poulenc, Inc., Research Triangle Park, North Carolina, USA (GLP).
- Thiodicarb, 104-week dietary carcinogenicity study in rats with 52 week interim kill. Results after 52 weeks. Atkinson, C., Hudson, P. & Ishwariah, V. (1994a) Unpublished report no. IRI 7881 Project No. 450441 from Inveresk Research International. Submitted to WHO by Rhone-Poulenc, Inc., Research Triangle Park, North Carolina, USA (GLP).
- Thiodicarb, 104-week dietary carcinogenicity study in rats. Atkinson, C., Hudson, P., Willerton, J. & Ishwariah, V. (1994b) Unpublished report no. IRI 11026 Project No. 450441 from Inveresk Research International. Submitted to WHO by Rhone-Poulenc, Inc., Research Triangle Park, North Carolina, USA (GLP).
