= Sudhansu Sobhan Maitra =

Indian physician

- Born: India
- Occupation: Physician
- Awards: 1962 Padma Bhushan

Sudhansu Sobhan Maitra was an Indian physician and a faculty member of Willingdon Hospital (present-day Ram Manohar Lohia Hospital). He was a graduate of Patna University and a World War II veteran for which he received a War Medal in 1944. The Government of India awarded him Padma Bhushan, the third highest Indian civilian award, in 1962. The Royal College of Physicians of Edinburgh elected him as a fellow in 1964.
