= Vitthal Laxman Phadke =

Indian social worker

- Born: Maharashtra, British India
- Other name: Mamasaheb Phadke
- Occupation: Social worker
- Awards: Padma Bhushan

Vitthal Laxman Phadke, better known as Mamasaheb Phadke, was an Indian social worker, writer and Gandhian, known for his sanitation services to the rural areas in British India. He was one among the leaders of the Sanitation Brigade, comprising 1200 volunteers, set up by the 1938 Haripura session of the Indian National Congress. The Government of India awarded him its third-highest civilian honour, the Padma Bhushan, in 1969, for his contributions to society.

Phadke wrote an autobiography, Mari Jeevan Katha (The Story of My Life), published by Navajivan Trust, a publishing house founded by Mahatma Gandhi.
