= Mansukhlal Atmaram Master =

Indian shipping professional

- Born: 1884; India
- Died: 1970 (aged 85–86)
- Occupations: Shipping professional Author; Lawyer
- Known for: Scindia Steam Navigation Company
- Awards: Padma Bhushan

Mansukhlal Atmaram Master (1884–1970) was an Indian shipping professional, writer and the general manager of Scindia Steam Navigation Company, one of the oldest shipping companies in India. Born in 1884 and a lawyer by profession, he was reported to have been a trusted associate of Walchand Hirachand, the founder of the company. He was one of the delegates who represented the Government of India at the Safety of Life at Sea international convention which prescribed safety measures for the maritime industry and was an elected plenipotentiary at the convention. He was the Vice- President of the All-India Organisation of Industrial Employers and was the author of several publications on shipping and economy, including Resources for the Third Plan and So I Rest on My Oars. The Government of India awarded him the third highest civilian honour of the Padma Bhushan, in 1968, for his contributions to Indian shipping industry.

== See also ==
- Scindia Steam Navigation Company Ltd.
