= Tapovan Maharaj =

Hindu sage and Vedanta scholar

Swami Tapovan Maharaj

Personal life
- Born: Subrahmanyan Nair; 3 December 1889 kerala
- Died: 16 January 1957 (aged 67)

Religious life
- Religion: Hinduism
- Philosophy: Vedanta

Religious career
- Disciples: Chinmayananda Saraswati

Tapovan Maharaj (1889–1957) was a Hindu sage and Vedanta scholar.

== Life ==
Swami Tapovan Maharaj is one of the most renowned saints of the 20th century. He was a contemporary of Swami Sivananda Maharaj who was the Guru of Swami Chinmayananda Maharaj.

Swami Tapovan Maharaj was born in 1889 on the Suklapaksha Ekadashi day of Mārgasirsa month. His mother, Kunjamma, belonged to an ancient aristocratic Nair Hindu family at Mudappallur in Palghat Taluk of Kerala. His father, Achutan, belonged to Kotuvayur in Kerala.

Based on his date of birth, the infant's horoscope, cast in accordance with family tradition, revealed "unusually contrary indications of huge prosperity and abject poverty".

Born with purvashrama name Subrahmanyan, he authored two books on his travels through the Himalayas: "Wanderings in the Himalayas" (Himagiri Viharam) and "Kailasa Yatra." Tapovan Maharaj exhibited a deep love for nature and his accounts of his travels demonstrate such. His autobiography, written in Sanskrit is titled "Ishvara Darshana". He died in the early hours of 16 January 1957, which was the day of Pausha Purnima according to Hindu calendar.

== See also ==
- Swami Sundaranand
