= Ekatmata Yatras =

Political-based pilgrimages

The Ekatmata Yatras were a series of pilgrimages and political strategies used to promote Hindu Polity or Hindutva. The strategy involved the mobilization of large pilgrimages (Yatras) to gather support for pro-Hindu political positions. The concept of the Ekatmata Yatra was formulated by the Vishva Hindu Parishad in the early 1980s.

== Description ==
During the 1960s, the rise of Hindu nationalism in Indian politics resulted in several Hindu-supportive political parties and organizations growing in size and influence. One of these organisations was Vishva Hindu Parishad (VHP), a right-wing organization which mobilized support for Hindu politicians and policies. In 1983, VHP decided to organize a widespread series of political pilgrimages across India; these Yatras were intended to galvanize public support for causes that VHP supported. In particular, the pilgrimages were organized in such a way as to be Pan-Hindu, allowing members of all castes to participate; this was in keeping with one of VHP's long-held opinions that the caste system should be suppressed. The march was also focused around that idea that, by reigniting interest in Hindu religious rights, Hindus would be less susceptible to conversion attempts by Christians and Muslims.

The first pilgrimage (later referred to as the First Ekatmata Yatra, translatable to "Pilgrimage of One Soulness") began in November 1983, and involved thousands of Hindus undertaking a pilgrimage to various holy sites. The pilgrims formed three processions; one from Kathmandu to Rameshwaram, a second from Gangasagar to Somnath temple, and a third from Haridwar to Kanyakumari. These three main pilgrim parties were supplemented by dozens of smaller groups, and carried relics and idols with them. Many pilgrims carried water from the sacred Ganges river during the journey, and the columns of travellers often stopped at Hindu temples and holy sites to gather more sacred water. All of the pilgrimage parties eventually congregated in Nagpur. The event involved Hindus from Burma, Nepal, India, Bhutan, and Bangladesh.

The first of the Ekatmata Yatras was well-received by many practitioners of Hinduism, and as such the prestige of the VHP was increased. Soon after the end of the marches, the organization was able to use the influence its high-profile pilgrimage had garnered to involve the organization in the ongoing Ayodhya dispute. VHP organized the Second Ekatmata Yatra in 1995, and the organization led two further pilgrimages (known as the 1996 Amarnath Yatra and the Baba Buddha Amarnath Yatra) in 1996 and 2005.
