= Sardar Harnarain Singh =

Indian army personnel

- Born: Phillaur, India
- Occupation: Army personnel
- Awards: Padma Bhushan

Sardar Harnarain Singh was an Indian army officer who held the rank of major general in the Indian Armed Forces. He was the head of the Rajput Regiment in early 1950s and served as the military secretary to Rajendra Prasad, the first president of India, and accompanied Prasad in his official visits.

== Awards ==
The Government of India awarded him the third highest civilian honour of the Padma Bhushan, in 1963, for his contributions to Indian Armed Forces.

== See also ==
- Rajendra Prasad
