= International Commission on Irrigation and Drainage =

- Formation: 1950
- Type: Non-for-profit international organization
- Purpose: Irrigation; drainage; flood management; agricultural water management
- Location: India (New Delhi - Headquarters)
- Key people: Dr. Marco Arcieri, President; Dr. Rakesh Gupta, Secretary General
- Website: icid.org

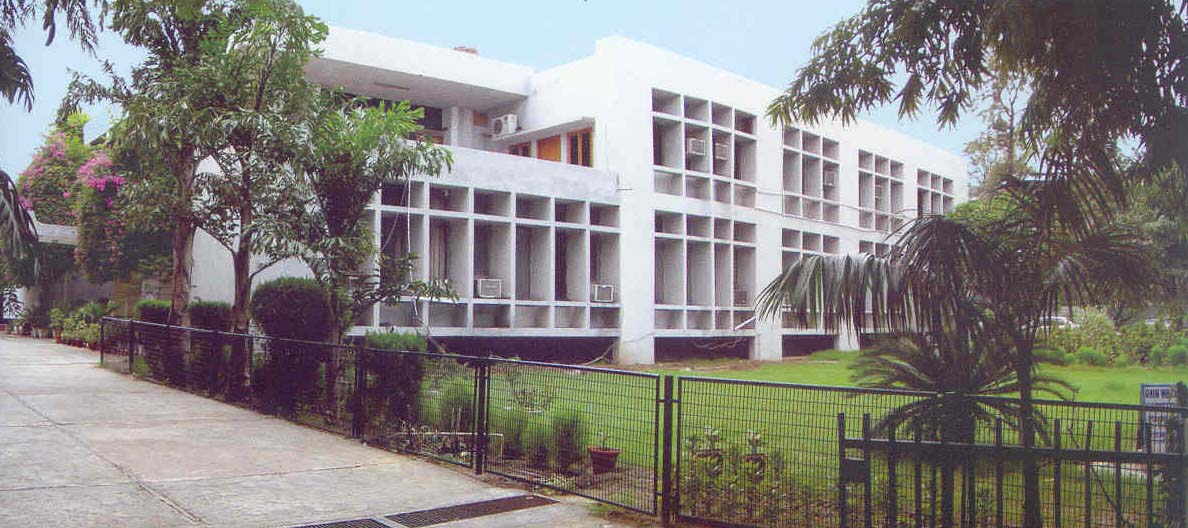
Central office building of ICID in New Delhi.

The International Commission on Irrigation and Drainage (ICID), established in 1950, is a global organization concerned with irrigation and drainage.

== Events ==
At the annual International Executive Council, various technical working groups organize meetings on the key focus areas as part of their Annual Meeting during the IEC. ICID organizes the triennial World Irrigation and Drainage Congress and World Irrigation Forum. Regional Conferences, Micro-irrigation Conference and Drainage Workshops are also organized to address and discuss issues of global/regional importance.
