= Mahankali Seetharama Rao =

Indian physician (1906–1977)

Colonel Mahankali Seetharama Rao FRCP

Personal details
- Born: 1906 India
- Died: 1977 (aged 70–71)

Mahankali Seetharama Rao (1906–1977) was an Indian physician best remembered for his services as chief physician to Indian Prime Minister Jawaharlal Nehru and honorary physician to Indian President Rajendra Prasad.

Born to a poor family, Rao completed his secondary schooling at Muthialpet Boys School in Chennai whereupon he matriculated to Madras Medical College. He qualified for his MBBS in 1929 and was admitted as a Member of the Royal College of Physicians a few years later. Rao received his first commission to the Indian Army in 1936, and served during World War II as a medical specialist in India’s Persia-Iraq force.

In 1954, Rao left the military to serve as Head of Medicine at New Delhi’s Safdarjang Hospital while also acting as a faculty of Medicine at the University of Delhi. From 1952-1964 he was personal physician to Prime Minister Nehru and Honorary Physician to the President of India from 1962.

In 1962, Col. Rao was awarded India's Padma Bhushan award for distinguished service in the field of medicine. In 1964, he relocated to London after being appointed medical adviser to Britain’s High Commissioner for India. The following year he was awarded Fellowship in the Royal College of Physicians.

He later returned to New Delhi upon retirement, where he provided free medical services to the needy until his death.
