= Ramanlal Gokaldas Saraiya =

Indian educationist

- Born: India
- Occupation: Educationist
- Awards: 1963 Padma Bhushan

Ramanlal Gokaldas Saraiya was an Indian educationist and a former president of Sarvajanik Education Society, Surat, a philanthropic society which manages several educational institutions including Sarvajanik College of Engineering and Technology. The Government of India awarded him Padma Bhushan, the third highest Indian civilian award, in 1963.
