= Tejomayananda =

Indian Hindu spiritual leader

H.H. Swami Tejomayananda Saraswati (Pujya Guruji)
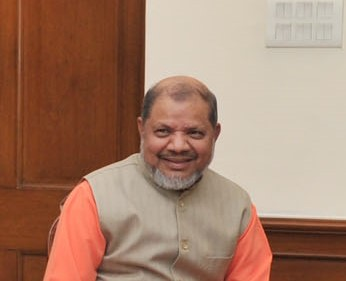

Personal life
- Born: Sudhakar Kaitwade; 30 June 1950 (age 75) Madhya Pradesh, India

Religious life
- Religion: Hinduism

Religious career
- Teacher: Chinmayananda Saraswati

Swami Tejomayananda Saraswati (born 30 June 1950), also known as Pujya Guruji and born Sudhakar Kaitwade, is an Indian spiritual leader. He was head of Chinmaya Mission from 1994 to 2017, until he was succeeded by Swami Swaroopananda in 2017.

== Initiation and disciplehood ==
In 1970, Sudhakar Kaitwade was a physics student at Bhopal, when he was about to complete his master's degree in physics. After attending couple of talks of Swami Chinmayananda on Bhagavad Gita, Sudhakar Kaitwade was inspired to join Chinmaya Mission's residential Vedanta course at Sandeepany Sadhanalaya in Mumbai. Upon completing the course in 1975, he was initiated as Brahmachari Vivek Chaitanya and also studied under Swami Dayananda Saraswati (Arsha Vidya) who was conducting the long-term resident course.

On 21 October 1983, Swami Chinmayananda initiated him into sannyasa, bestowing upon him the name Swami Tejomayananda.

== Missionary work ==
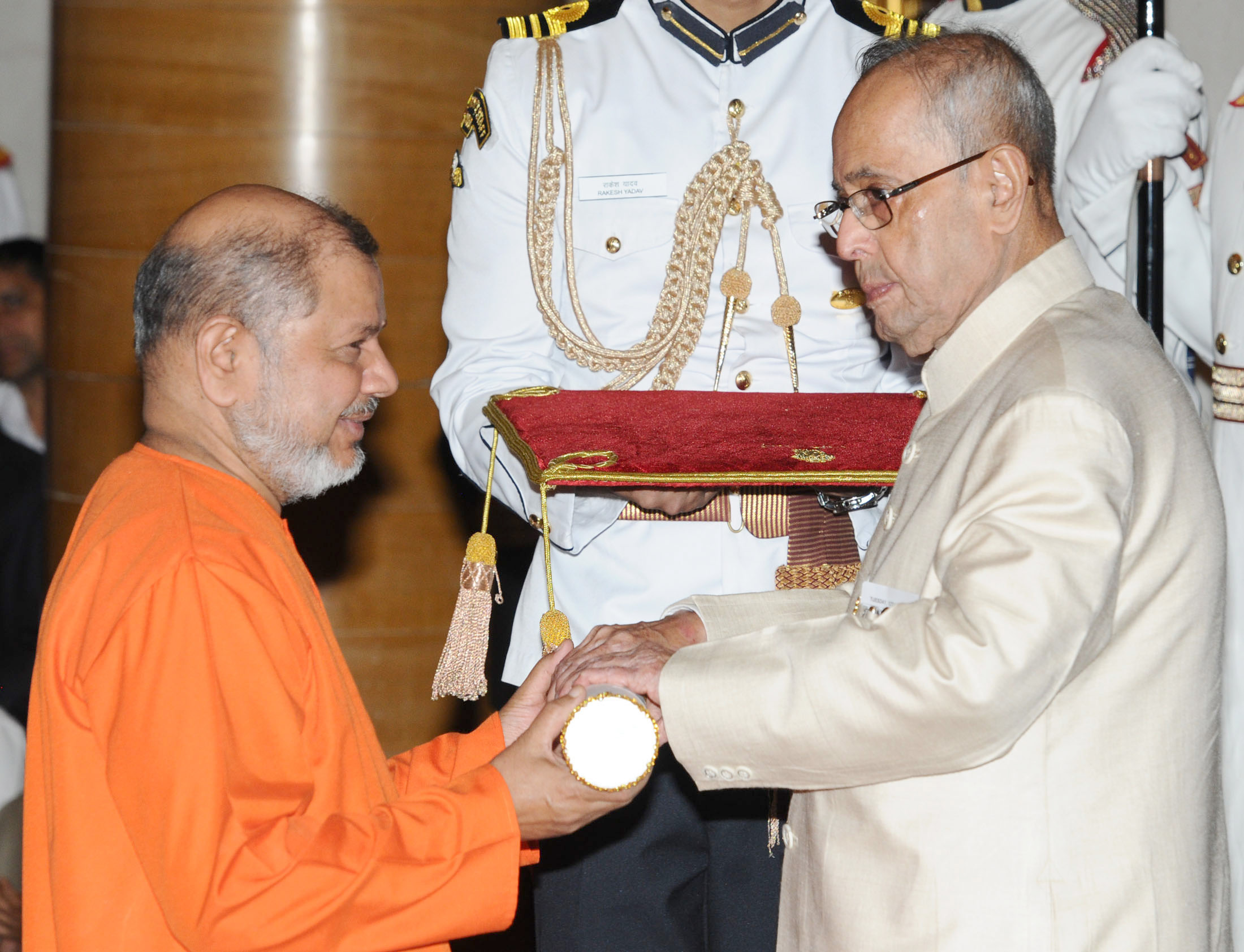
The President, Shri Pranab Mukherjee presenting the Padma Bhushan Award to Swami Tejomayananda, on April 12, 2016

As the Head of Chinmaya Mission Worldwide, Swami Tejomayananda – known in the Mission as Pujya Guruji – has been involved in several projects, including the Chinmaya International Residential School in Coimbatore, the Chinmaya Centre of World Understanding in New Delhi, the Chinmaya International Foundation near Cochin, the Chinmaya Heritage Centre in Chennai, the expansion of the Chinmaya Mission Hospital in Bangalore and the Chinmaya Vibhooti Vision Centre near Pune.

He has travelled internationally extensively. Throughout his travels, he conducts jnana yajnas (3-7 day Vedanta lecture series) in different cities and various countries every week.

== Roles ==
Swami Tejomayananda has served several roles in Chinmaya Mission, including

- Acharya of the Sandeepany Sadhanalaya ashram in Mumbai, India (1983–1989)
- Acharya of Chinmaya Mission's center at San Jose, California, USA (1989–1993)
- Head of Chinmaya Mission Worldwide (1993–2017)

== Awards ==
- Swami Tejomayananda was awarded the Padma Bhushan, the third highest civilian award in the Republic of India, in 2016.

== Works ==
Swami Tejomayananda has published more than 100 books on Vedanta. He is also a prolific composer and poet, amidst his fluency in four languages - English, Hindi, Marathi, and Sanskrit. His poetry describing Vedantic concepts are also renowned.
