= Chinmaya Mission =

Religious organization

- Logo
- Formation: 1951
- Founder: Chinmayananda Saraswati
- Type: Spiritual organization
- Legal status: Trust
- Purpose: Spirituality, Vedanta
- Headquarters: Mumbai, Maharashtra, India
- Location: International
- Region served: Worldwide
- Headed By: Swaroopananda
- Main organ: Central Chinmaya Mission Trust
- Website: chinmayamission.com

The Chinmaya Mission (Sanskrit: चिन्मया मिशन्) is an international Hindu organisation that spreads "Vedantic wisdom" through "spiritual retreats, cultural programmes, service initiatives, and educational institutions." Followers of Chinmayananda Saraswati established the Chinmaya Mission in India in 1953.

The mission operates over 300 mission centres. It is currently administered by Central Chinmaya Mission Trust (CCMT) in Mumbai, India, headed by Swaroopananda.

== History ==
=== Foundation ===
Chinmayananda Saraswati (born Balakrishna Menon), the founder of Chinmaya Mission, was born in the city of Ernakulam in present-day Kerala, India. Menon met Sivananda of the Divine Life Society, who became his spiritual teacher and then placed him under the tutelage of Tapovan Maharaj. He later became a teacher himself and changed his name to Chinmayananda.

=== After Chinmayananda ===
After Chinmayananda died in 1993, his disciple Tejomayananda (known as Pujya Guruji and previously known as "Sudhakarbhai Kaitwadeji") became the global head of Chinmaya Mission. Under Tejomayananda, projects such as the Chinmaya International Foundation and the Chinmaya International Residential School were launched.

In January 2017, Tejomayananda abdicated his leadership position to Swaroopananda.

In 2026, Chinmaya Mission celebrated its 75th anniversary through the Chinmaya Amrit Mahotsav, a series of events including dialogues with spiritual teachers, Vedic Chanting by Brahmacharis, and a conclave on non-dualism for world understanding. This culminated in a Global Sammelan(Conference) at Bharat Mandapam, New Delhi from 23–25 October 2026.

== Activities ==

=== Youth Activities ===
Bala Vihar is a program in which children from age five to eighteen meet on a weekly basis to learn about Hindu culture, customs, and philosophy. Some centers also have a version called Sishu Vihar, which is meant infants. Bal Vihar clases include singing bhajans, recounting stories and values of Hindu tradition, Arti, and prasad.

The Chinmaya Yuva Kendra (CHYK) serves as the Chinmaya Mission's youth organization. It conducts camps and educational programmes. In a National Youth Convention in 2025, around 750 participants took part in cultural programmes and discussions about education.

=== Religious Media ===
The mission has produced material on Hindu philosophy and scriptures through publications and other programmes. It aired the television series Upanishad Ganga, which was first broadcast in Hindi on Doordarshan and then later released in Tamil, Malayalam, Telugu and Kannada in 2025. This series highlights teachings from the Upanishads.

=== Healthcare and social service ===
Chinmaya Mission has participated in healthcare and social service activities through its local centres. The Chinmaya Mission Hospital in Bengaluru was established in 1960 and expanded by 1970, since its establishment, the hospital has provided medical services. During COVID-19 pandemic, 84 beds were reserved for COVID-19 patients with over 80 patients being treated there in September 2020.

The Chinmaya Mission Diagnostic Centre provides affordable medical and diagnostic services in Mumbai.

Chinmaya Mission's local centres have also organised medical camps for disadvantaged communities. It has helped by providing medical supplies, equipment and protective gears during the COVID-19 pandemic.

=== Education ===
Chinmaya Institute of Nursing was established in 1986 under the Karnataka Chinmaya Seva Trust. The Institute's motto is "service to mankind is service to God."

The Central Chinmaya Mission Trust (CCMT) administers over 88 schools and colleges.

== See also ==
- List of Hindu organisations
- Chinmayananda Saraswati
- Swami Sivananda
- Swami Dayananda
