= Chinmayananda Saraswati =

Indian Hindu spiritual leader

Chinmayananda
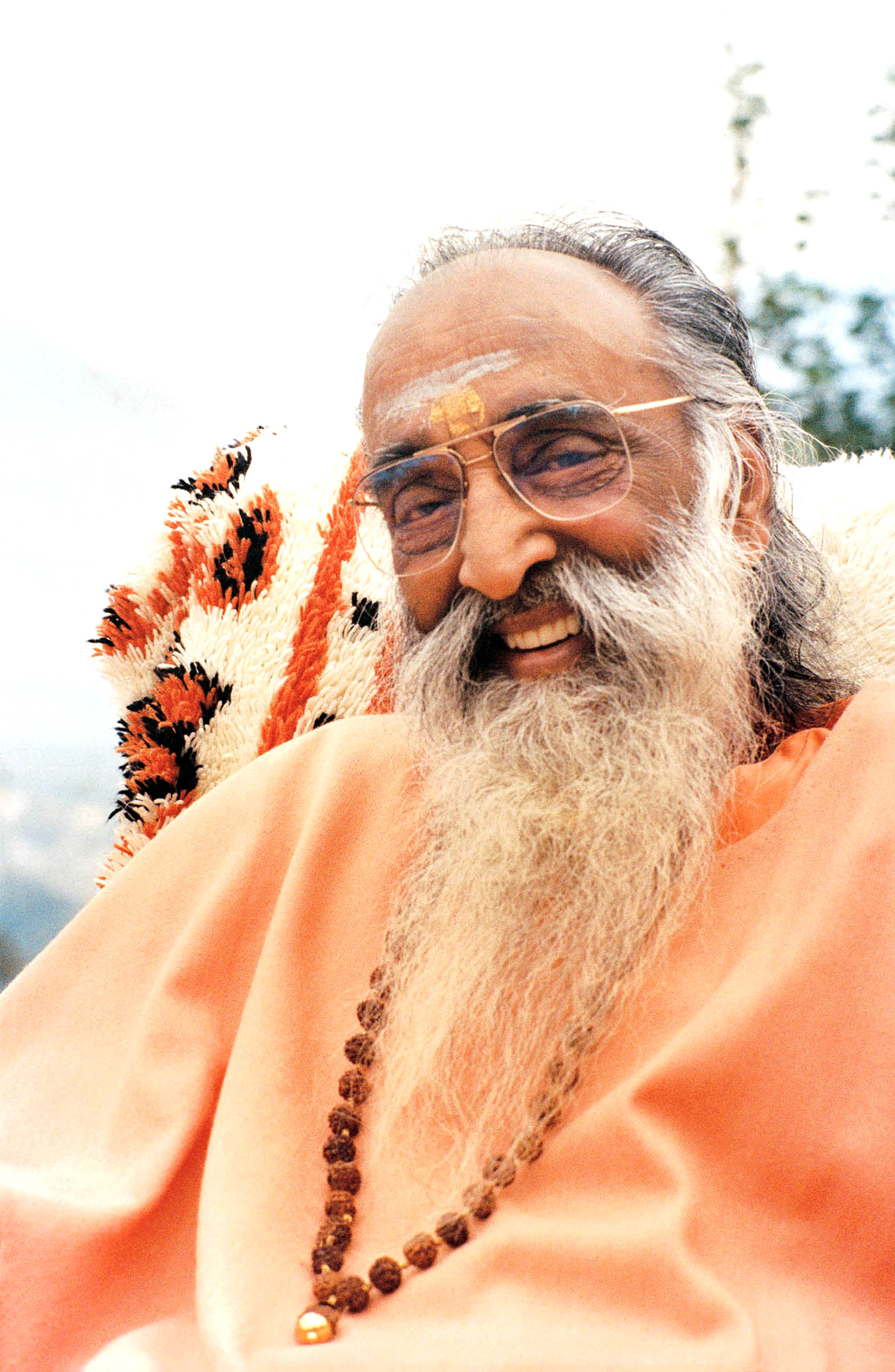
- A portrait of Chinmayananda in 1990

Personal life
- Born: Balakrishna Menon; 8 May 1916 Ernakulam, Cochin Princely State, British India (present-day Kerala)
- Died: 3 August 1993 (aged 77) San Diego, California, U.S. Resting place: Sidhbari
- Notable work(s): The Holy Geeta and many others

Religious life
- Religion: Hinduism
- Founder of: Chinmaya Mission; Vishva Hindu Parishad
- Philosophy: Advaita Vedanta

Religious career
- Teacher: Sivananda Saraswati; Tapovan Maharaj
- Disciples: Swami Tejomayananda Swami Swaroopananda Swami Dayananda

Quotation

- "The tragedy of human history is that there is decreasing happiness in the midst of increasing comforts."
- "The real guru is the pure intellect within; and the purified, deeply aspiring mind is the disciple."
- "We may often give without love, but we can never love without giving."

Swami Chinmayananda Saraswati (IAST: Svāmī Cinmayānanda Sarasvatī), also known as Pujya Gurudev Swami Chinmayananda Saraswati (born Balakrishna Menon; 8 May 1916 – 3 August 1993), was a Hindu spiritual leader and teacher. In 1953, he founded Chinmaya Mission, a worldwide nonprofit organisation, in order to spread the knowledge of Advaita Vedanta as well as the Bhagavad Gita, the Upanishads, and other ancient Hindu scriptures. Through the Mission, Swami Chinmayananda spearheaded a global Hindu spiritual and cultural renaissance that popularised these spiritual texts and values to English speaking audiences across India and globally.

Swami Chinmayananda was originally a journalist and participated in the Indian independence movement. Under the tutelage of Swami Sivananda and later Tapovan Maharaj, he began studying Vedanta and took the vow of sannyasa. He gave his first jñāna yajña, or lecture series about Hindu spirituality, in 1951, starting the work of the Mission. Today, Chinmaya Mission encompasses more than 300 centres in India and internationally and conducts educational, spiritual, and charitable activities.

Swami Chinmayananda's approach was characterised by an appeal to the English-educated Indian middle class and Indian diaspora; he gave lectures and published books in English. Swami Chinmayananda also helped found the Vishva Hindu Parishad (VHP), an Indian right-wing Hindu organisation that is considered a member of the Sangh Parivar. In 1964, he convened delegates to create the VHP at Sandeepany ashram and served as the organisation's first president. He aimed to "awake(n) the Hindus and to make them conscious of their proud place in the comity of nations," saying that, "Let us convert Hindus to Hinduism, then everything will be all right."

Swami Chinmayananda authored 95 publications, including commentaries on the major Upanishads and Bhagavad Gita. He was a visiting professor of Indian philosophy at several American and Asian universities, and he conducted university lecture tours in many countries.

== Biography ==
=== Early life and education (1916–1942) ===
Balakrishna Menon, who later became known as Swami Chinmayananda, was born in the city of Ernakulam in Kerala, India, on 8 May 1916, as the eldest son of a prominent judge, Kutta Menon, who was the nephew of the Maharaja of Cochin. His mother, Paru Kutty, fondly called 'Manku', died while giving birth to her third child. Consequently, Balakrishna was raised by his mother's eldest sister, Kochunarayani.

He completed his formal schooling in Sree Rama Varma High School, Kochi (1921–1928) and Vivekodayam School, Thrissur (1928–1932). He completed his FA (Fellow of Arts) at the Maharaja's College, Ernakulam (1932–1934), and his BA (Bachelor of Arts) at the St. Thomas College, Trichur (1935–1937). He went on to Lucknow University (1940–1943) to earn postgraduate degrees in English literature and law, while completing courses in journalism.

=== Indian independence movement and imprisonment ===
Approaching August 1942, in the midst of a wide-scale attempt by Indian activists to make the British "Quit India," Balan was one of the students to join in writing and distributing leaflets to stir up national pride. A warrant was issued for his arrest. When word of this reached him, he went undercover spending the next year moving around in the state of Abbottabad, out of range of British officials, and then moved to Delhi.

In 1944, almost two years after the British had issued his arrest warrant, believing his case was long forgotten, Balan arrived in Punjab and associated himself with several freedom groups. He advised students on distributing leaflets and organising public strikes but was arrested and imprisoned.

=== Career in journalism ===
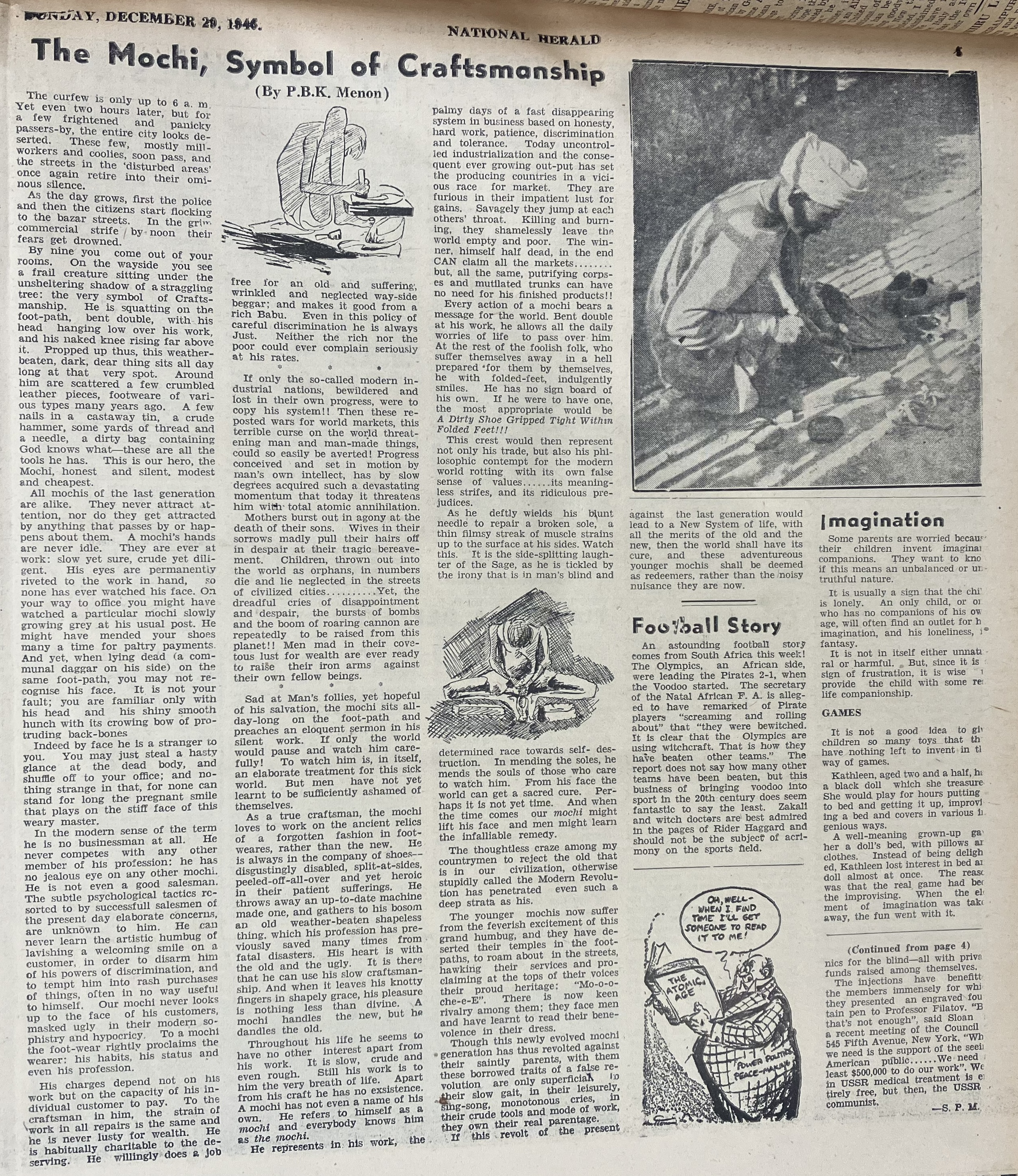
Balan's article "The Mochi, Symbol of Craftmanship," published in the National Herald on 20 December 1946.

Balan slowly recovered his health. K. Rama Rao gave Balan his first job, as a journalist at The National Herald, a young newspaper that had been founded a few years back by Jawaharlal Nehru. He wrote a series of articles on the imperative of socialism in a society where the vast majority of people were poor. He covered subjects ranging from history and culture to social and political issues. Articles such as "In Praise of the Postman," and "The Mochi—Symbol of Craftsmanship," gained him a reputation as a controversial character. In 1947, he began a new series of articles for The Commonweal.

=== Study of Vedanta ===
It was while working as a journalist that he travelled to Sivananda's ashram in Rishikesh for the purpose of writing an exposé of the sadhus. He later said, "I went not to gain knowledge, but to find out how the swamis were keeping up the bluff among the masses." In the summer of 1947, Balan arrived in Rishikesh, by the banks of the Ganges and made the one-mile hike to the Divine Life Society, the ashram of Swami Sivananda. Swami Sivananda’s radiance, laughter, compassion, and simple directness completely disarmed him. Balakrishnan felt something he had never felt before; A sense of inner stillness a peace that did not depend on outer circumstances and a joy that seemed effortless. The sages opened his eyes. Balan extended his stay from a week to a month, then more and more. At the age of 31, he went from being a sceptic to an enthusiast, finally becoming a renunciate monk. He began reading more about Hindu scriptures and reviewing spiritual books. Sivananda recognised Balan's latent talents and entrusted him to organise a Gita Committee. Having returned to the Divine Life Society ashram, on 25 February 1949, the holy day of Mahashivratri, Balan was initiated into sannyasa (Hindu vow of renunciation) by Sivananda, who gave him the name Swami Chinmayananda, or "bliss of pure Consciousness."

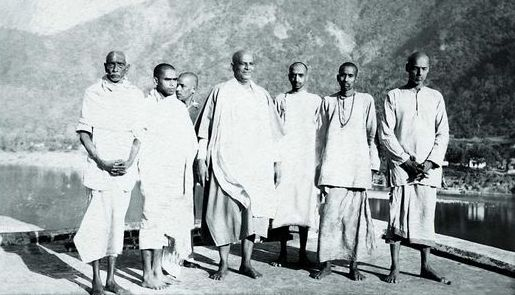
Chinmayananda on the day of his Sannyas initiation, standing on the right of Sivananda Saraswati and other disciples, 25 February 1949, Maha Shivratri Day, Rishikesh.

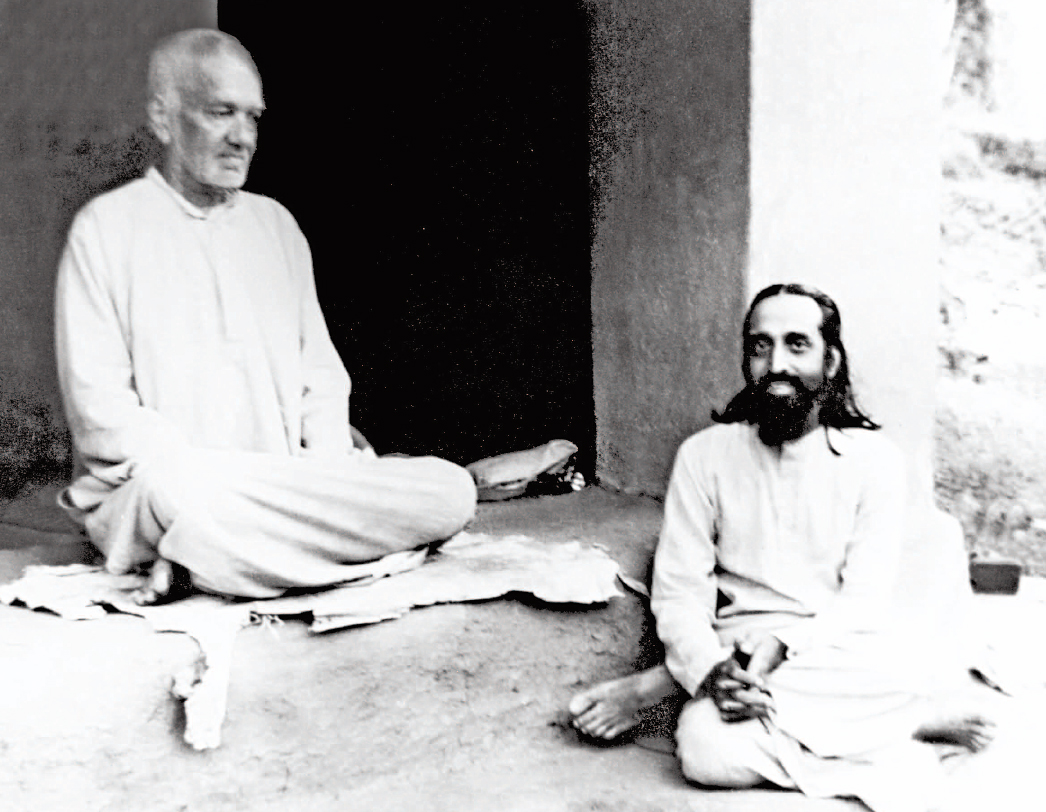
Swami Tapovan Maharaj and Swami Chinmayananda at Uttarkashi, 1956

With Sivananda's blessing, Swami Chinmayananda sought out one of the greatest Vedantic masters of his time, Tapovan Maharaj of Uttarkashi, and devoted the next few years of his life to an intensive study of Vedanta under his tutelage.

=== Launch of spiritual movement ===
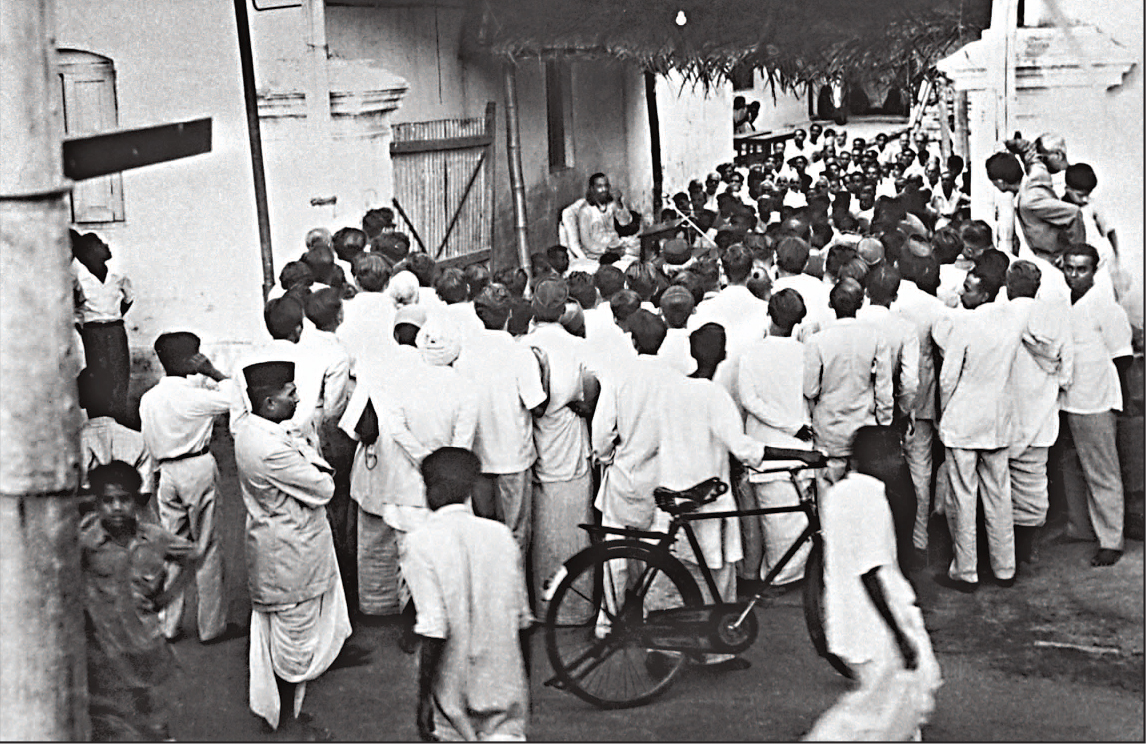
Swami Chinmayananda's impromptu satsang in an alley

In 1951, flying in the face of orthodox Hindu traditions but with the blessings of his guru, Swami Chinmayananda decided to bring the teachings of Vedanta to the masses. In May of that year, he left the Himalayas with a plan to set out on an all-India tour and to visit places of worship to see how Hindu religious heritage was being handed down. He said of that time: "I was miserably disillusioned and disappointed about ... the stuff doled out as the best in Hinduism. ... My experiences during those five months of roaming only strengthened my conviction that I must execute ... Upanishad Jñāna Yajña sessions (lecture series) all over India, in all the great cities."

Swami Chinmayananda held his first lecture series at a Ganesha temple in the city of Pune in December 1951. His audiences soon swelled from a handful into thousands. Army officers from the Southern Command attended and the audience overflowed into the lanes near the temple. Everyone in the audience, man and woman, across all social strata, was asked to participate in the rituals.

=== Chinmaya Mission ===
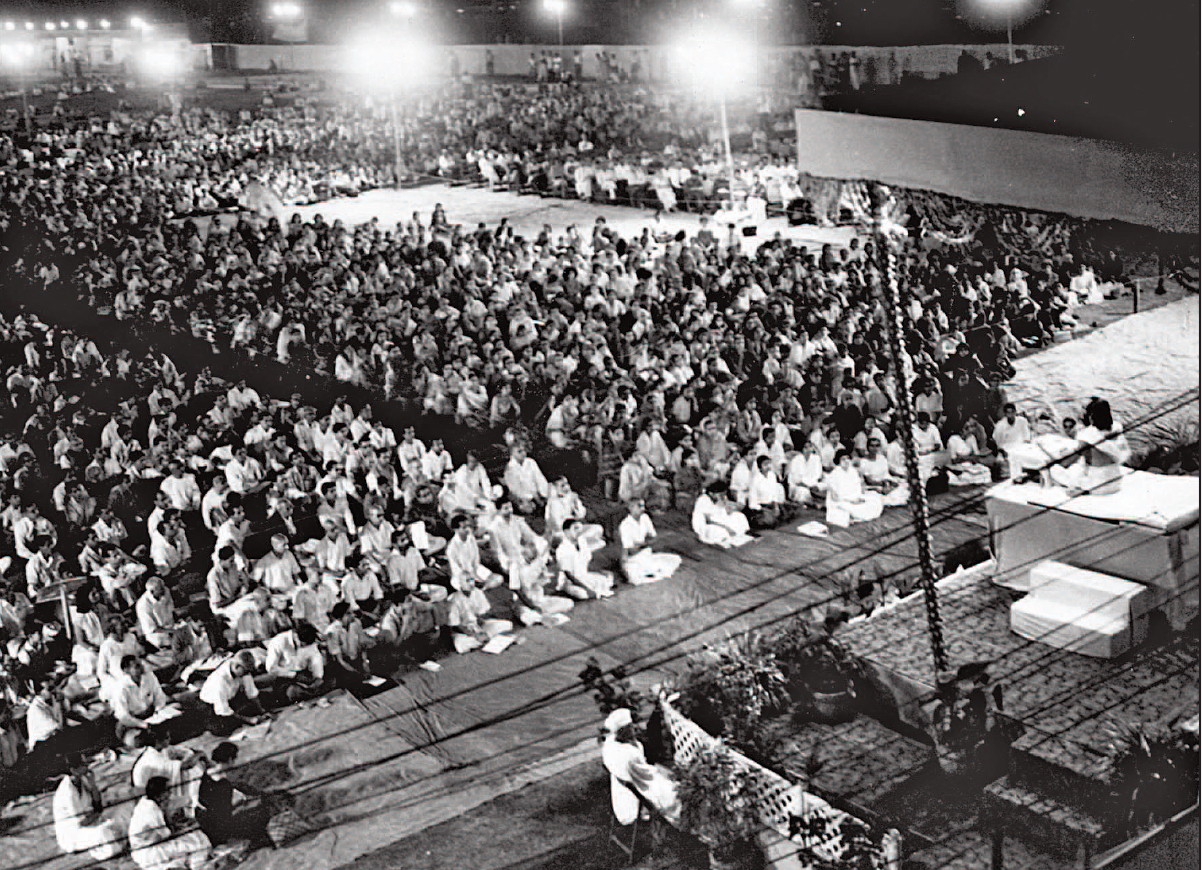
Audience at a jñāna yajña by Swami Chinmayananda in South India

At the end of the second jñāna yajña in Madras in 1953, a handful of people expressed the desire to create a forum for the study and discussion of Vedanta. Swami Chinmayananda agreed in principle, but he said, "Don't start any organisation in my name. I have not come here to be institutionalised. I have come here to give the message of our ancient sages, which has benefited me. If it has benefited you, pass it on."

The Madras group insisted that the best way to "pass it on" was through the support of a forum. They wrote back pointing out that the word "Chinmaya" did not have to indicate Swami Chinmayananda's name, since, in Sanskrit, the word itself means "pure Knowledge", which they were seeking. He conceded. On 8 August 1953, the Chinmaya Mission was formed.

Before long, hundreds of study groups were set up all over the country for people to get together in small batches to study religion and philosophy in a systematic manner. Devi groups were organised for women to take up regular spiritual study and social work.

In 1956, the 23rd jñāna yajña in Delhi was inaugurated by the President of India, Rajendra Prasad. He spoke highly of the work Swami Chinmayananda was doing to restore India's cultural glory. In a span of five years, Swami Chinmayananda had instructed over 50,000 of his countrymen through 25 jñāna yajñas across the country.

On 6 March 1965, Swami Chinmayananda set out on his first global teaching tour, covering 39 cities in 18 countries: Thailand, Hong Kong, Japan, Malaysia, United States, Mexico, Spain, United Kingdom, Belgium, the Netherlands, Sweden, Germany, Denmark, France, Switzerland, Italy, Greece and Lebanon. Over the next 28 years, he continued these international discourses, staying only a week or so in each place, delivering a minimum of two lectures a day, and handling numerous meetings, interviews, discussions, and programs. He wrote scores of letters a day.

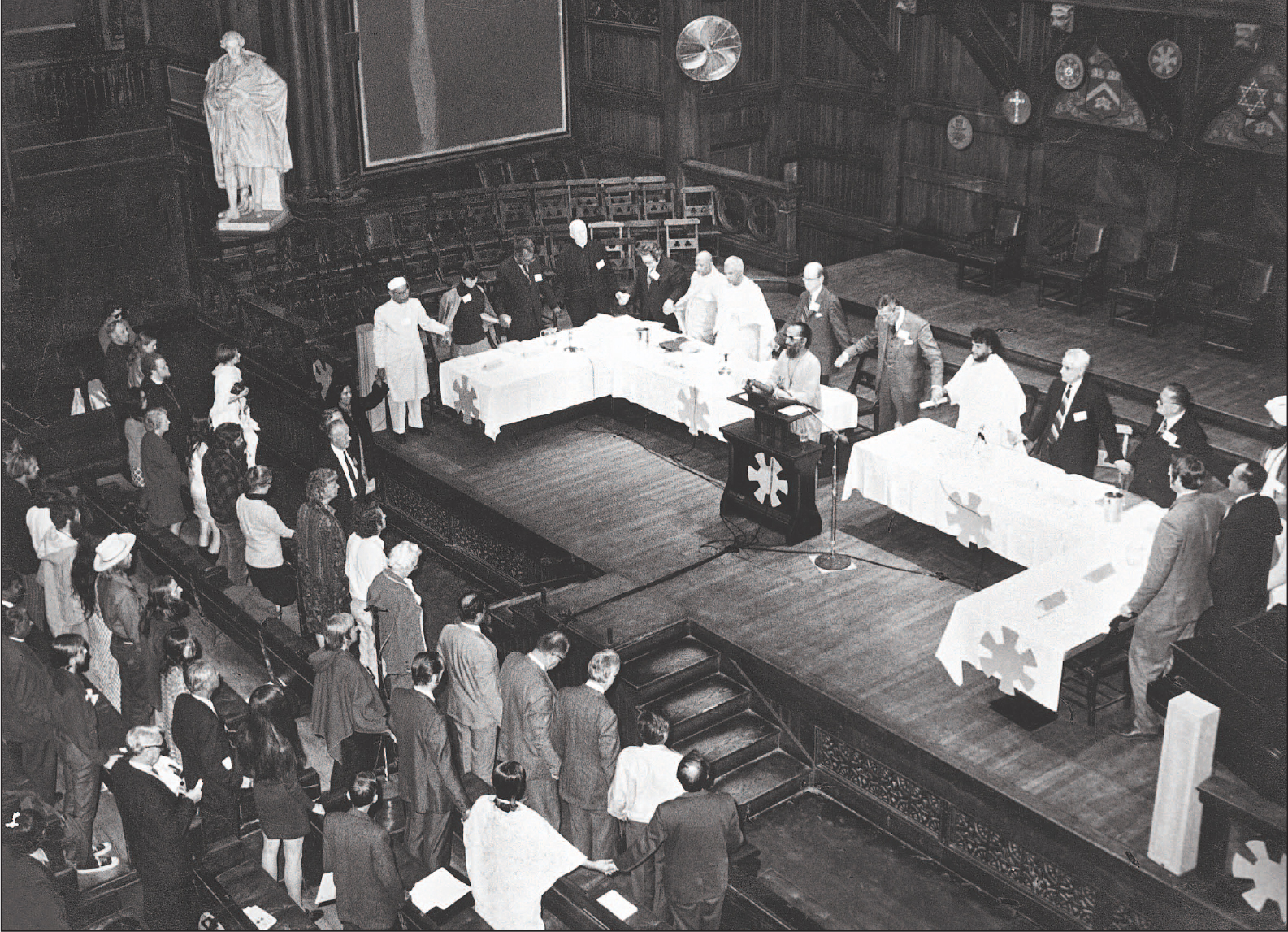
Swami Chinmayananda leading the prayer at an interfaith seminar, Harvard University, Massachusetts, 1971

It soon became necessary to co-ordinate the growing spiritual movement in the United States. Chinmaya Mission West was formed in 1975 for this purpose.

Swami Chinmayananda's message resonated with heads of other faiths. One of his yajñas in Bombay was inaugurated by Cardinal Valerian Gracias, a prominent Catholic archbishop of the time. The Dalai Lama, head of the Tibetan Buddhist order, visited with him at the Chinmaya Mission ashram in Sidhbari in 1981. Swami Chinmayananda was a supporter of interfaith dialogue and participated in many interfaith events.

In 1992, he undertook a lecture tour of twelve US universities to establish an international library and research center, the Chinmaya International Foundation, in Kerala, India.

=== Vishva Hindu Parishad ===
In 1963, Swami Chinmayananda wrote an article airing the idea of calling for a World Hindu Council, inviting delegates from throughout the world to discuss the difficulties and needs concerning the "survival and development of Hindu culture." This attracted the attention of RSS pracharak S. S. Apte, who was airing similar ideas at that time.

In the same year, Chinmaya Mission collected ₹10,000 to fund the construction of the Vivekananda Rock Memorial, which the RSS was building at the time in Kanyakumari. Additionally, in August 1964, the Pope announced that the International Eucharistic Conference would be held in November in Bombay, and stated that a specific number of Hindus would be converted to Christianity; Swami Chinmayananda announced in response that he would convert an even greater number of people to Hinduism.

Apte and Swami Chinmayananda jointly organised such a conference at the Sandeepany ashram in August 1964, which resulted in the founding of the Vishva Hindu Parishad. Swami Chinmayananda was elected as president and Apte as general secretary of the new organisation.

According to Chinmayananda, the VHP was founded in order to

awake(n) the Hindus and to make them conscious of their proud place in the comity of nations. Once we have made every Hindu conscious of his own identity, the Parishad has done its job and we shall feel fully rewarded... ...

Let us convert Hindus to Hinduism, then everything will be all right.

He also believed that the VHP should be focused on educating members of the Hindu diaspora and their children about knowledge of their "cultural duties and spiritual values" and give them the opportunity to "learn, to appreciate and involve themselves in our tradition". In the 1980s, Swami Chinmayananda also supported the VHP's Ekatmata Yatras, stating that those who oppose the yatras "have no respect for national unity and suffer from alienation from the country."

In 1992, Swami Chinmayananda attended the Vishwa Hindu Parishad's 5th European Hindu Conference in Frankfurt, Germany, where the ongoing Ayodhya dispute was a major topic of discussion. During the conference, he stated that the 14 pillars of the Babri Masjid that were identifiable as Hindu temple pillars should be turned over to the Hindus. The mosque was illegally destroyed by VHP activists later that year in an escalation of the Ayodhya dispute.

In January 1993, he gave an interview to Ram Madhav in which he discussed the demolition of the Babri Masjid. Comparing it to the fall of the Berlin Wall, he asserted that "pulling down that structure is nothing wrong" because it was not really used as a mosque. "First let us have this Rama Temple," he said, after which there were "two more monuments which are built upon our Krishna’s birth place and Kashi Viswanath." He stated that enthusiasm for the Ram Temple today was not enough, asking Hindus, "Are we ready to live Rama’s life?"

At the time of his death,Swami Chinmayananda was to have been a featured speaker at the World Vision 2000 Global Conference in Washington, D.C., from 6 to 8 August, staged by the VHP to mark the centenary of Swami Vivekananda's 1893 address to the Parliament of World Religions. On 8 August, five days after Swami Chinmayananda died, conference delegates observed a moment of silence in tribute to him.

=== Illness and death ===
Swami Chinmayananda had many illnesses, including diabetes, hypertension and heart disease. He had his first heart attack in 1969, when his treatment at the newly opened Chinmaya Mission Hospital in Bangalore made him its first patient. In the summer of 1980, when he was in the United States for a series of jnana yajnas, he had to undergo multiple heart bypass surgeries in Texas.

On 26 July 1993, he suffered breathing problems in San Diego, California, while staying at a family devotee's house for the day before a yagna camp that was supposed to take place in Los Angeles, the next day. Taken to Scripps Memorial Hospital in La Jolla, he was later transferred to Sharp Memorial Hospital, where he had a quintuple bypass surgery on 29 July. But his condition continued to be critical and he was put on a life-support system. He died five days later at 5:45 pm on 3 August 1993, aged 77. His followers mark the date as the occasion of Mahasamadhi Day.

On 7 August 1993, thousands of people were at Indira Gandhi International Airport in New Delhi when his body returned to India. It was transported to Sidhbari, Himachal Pradesh, where it was finally laid to rest in accordance with Vedic ritual. A mahasamadhi shrine has been built there.

At the time of his death, Swami Chinmayananda was to have spoke at the VHP's World Vision 2000 Global Conference in Washington, D.C., and led the Hindu delegation for the 1993 Parliament of World's Religions, both events which took place later that August.

=== Tribute ===
Forty years after his first jñāna yajña, on 24 December 1991, in the Leela Kempinski Hotel, in Bombay, Swami Chinmayananda's devotees gathered in Mumbai to offer him an amount of gold equal to his body weight, presented to him on a tula (ceremonial balance scale) in an age-old ritual called suvarņa tulābhāram. The funds generated were used to support the myriad service projects and programs of Chinmaya Mission.

== Legacy ==
=== Chinmaya Mission ===
Chinmayananda established ashrams around the world as places for spiritual retreat, study, and practice.

There are numerous and diverse devotional, spiritual, cultural, and social projects that the Chinmaya Mission continues to administer and conduct in Chinmayananda's memory, including the Bala Vihar, the Chinmaya Yuva Kendra (CHYK, the global youth wing of Chinmaya Mission), and Chinmaya Study Groups for adults, which are also known as Devi Groups. The Mission has also constructed over 58 temples in India and abroad and it operates the Chinmaya Organisation for Rural Development (CORD), which was founded by Chinmayananda to facilitate integrated sustainable development for the poor through self-empowerment.

=== Chinmaya International Foundation ===
He established the Chinmaya International Foundation at the Tharavad house of Adi Shankara which the foundation bought – in the village Veliyanad in Eranakulam District in Kerala.

=== Nursery school ===
From its beginnings in 1965 at a nursery school inaugurated by Chinmayananda in Kollengode, Kerala (India), today there are over 76 Chinmaya Vidyalayas (schools), seven Chinmaya colleges, and the Chinmaya International Residential School in India, and the first Chinmaya Vidyalaya outside India's borders, in Trinidad, West Indies.

=== Medical facilities ===
Chinmayananda inaugurated the Chinmaya Mission Hospital in 1970. The facility has grown into a modern, fully equipped 200-bed hospital in Bangalore in Karnataka, India.

In the late 1970s, Chinmayananda established rural health care services in Sidhbari, Himachal Pradesh, India.

=== Publications ===
Chinmayananda authored 95 publications in his lifetime, including forty commentaries on classical scriptural texts, eight compilations, 13 co-authored works and 34 original works. Over the years, luxury hotels in India started keeping a copy of his commentary on the Bhagavad-gita in all their guest rooms. His books, written in English, have been translated into numerous regional Indian languages, including Hindi, Tamil, Malayalam, Marathi, Telugu, Kannada, Odia, Bengali, Sindhi, and Urdu and in one European language, French. His birth centenary has been celebrated with publication of Chinmaya Birth Centenary Series. A series of 12 books were being published. The last in the series is on the teachings of Swami Chinmayananda, through the analogy of tennis, which he always loved. The book is named as 'Final Score – Love All'.

=== BMI chart ===
The BMI (Body Mind Intellect) Chart is a teaching tool innovated by Chinmayananda that became one of his hallmarks. It categorises the totality of human experience, according to the science of Vedanta, by drawing on 11 characters of the English and Devanagari alphabets.

=== Honours and recognition ===
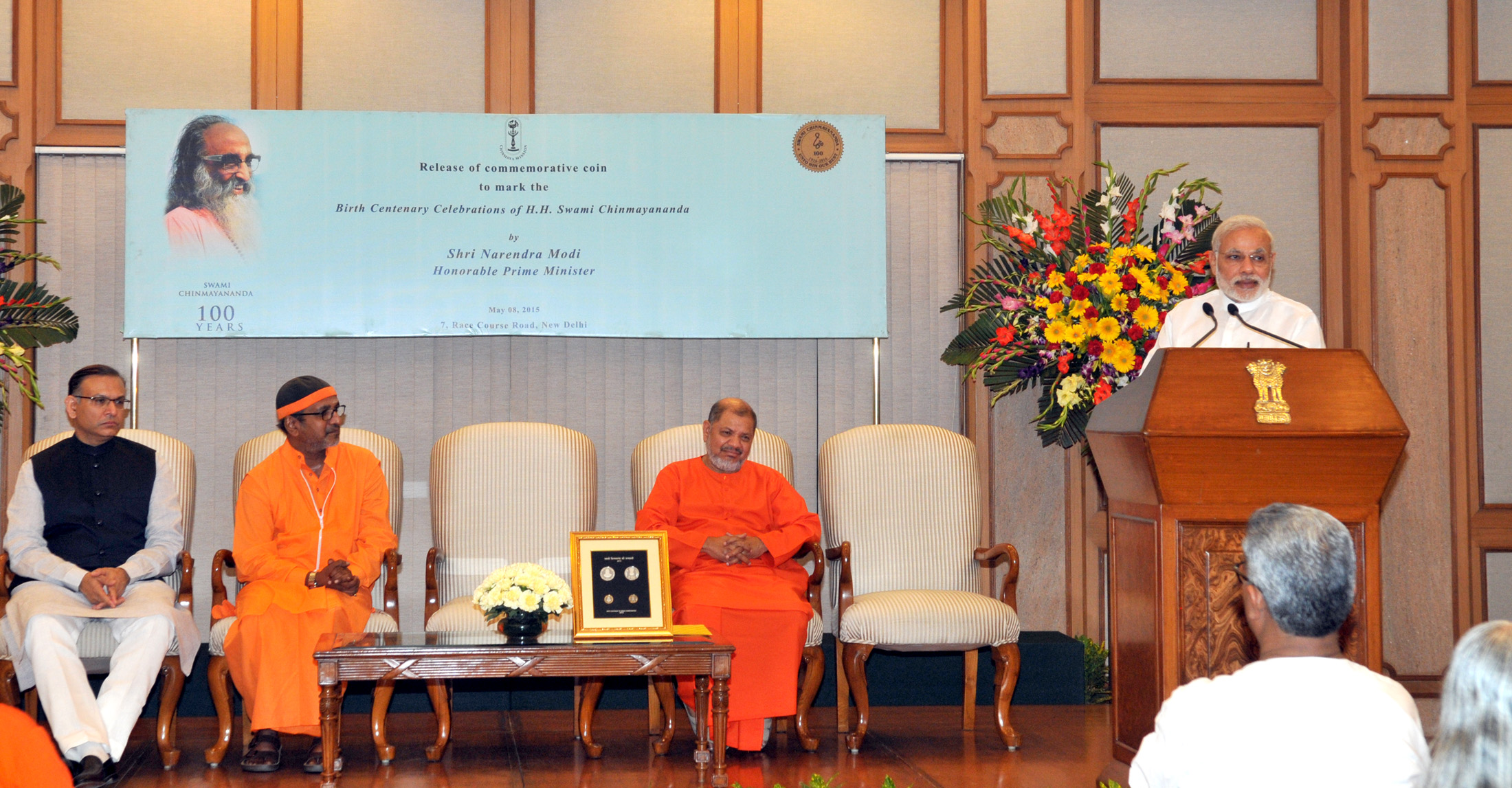
Prime Minister Modi addresses the audience at the release of a commemorative coin to mark the birth centenary of Swami Chinmayananda, in New Delhi on 8 May 2015.

On 2 December 1992, Chinmayananda addressed the United Nations and the talk was titled "Planet in Crisis."

The US magazine, Hinduism Today, conferred him with its Hindu Renaissance Award and the title of "Hindu of the Year" in 1992.

In 1993, he was selected as "President of Hindu Religion" for the Centennial Conference of the Parliament of the World's Religions in Chicago, where Swami Vivekananda had given his address one hundred years previously. He was also to be honoured for his selfless service to humanity in Washington, DC at "World Vision 2000," a conference of religious leaders organised by Vishva Hindu Parishad on 6–8 August 1993. He did not attend either of the latter two functions, as he attained Mahasamadhi, in San Diego, on 3 August 1993.

On 8 May 2015, Indian Prime Minister Narendra Modi released a commemorative ₹20 coin to mark his birth centenary.

=== Biopic ===
In 2014, On a Quest, an English-language biopic featuring the life and works of Chinmayananda, was released. In June 2022, the movie was released to the public on YouTube in English, Hindi and Sanskrit languages. In August 2022, the movie was released in Tamil, Telugu, and Malayalam languages.

== See also ==
- Official page of Swami Chinmayananda
- Dayananda Saraswati (Arsha Vidya)
- Avula Parthasarathy
- Tejomayananda
