= Jama Mosque, Dharamshala =

Mosque in Dharamshala, Himachal Pradesh, India

Jama Mosque
- Arabic: مسجد الجمعة درمشلله
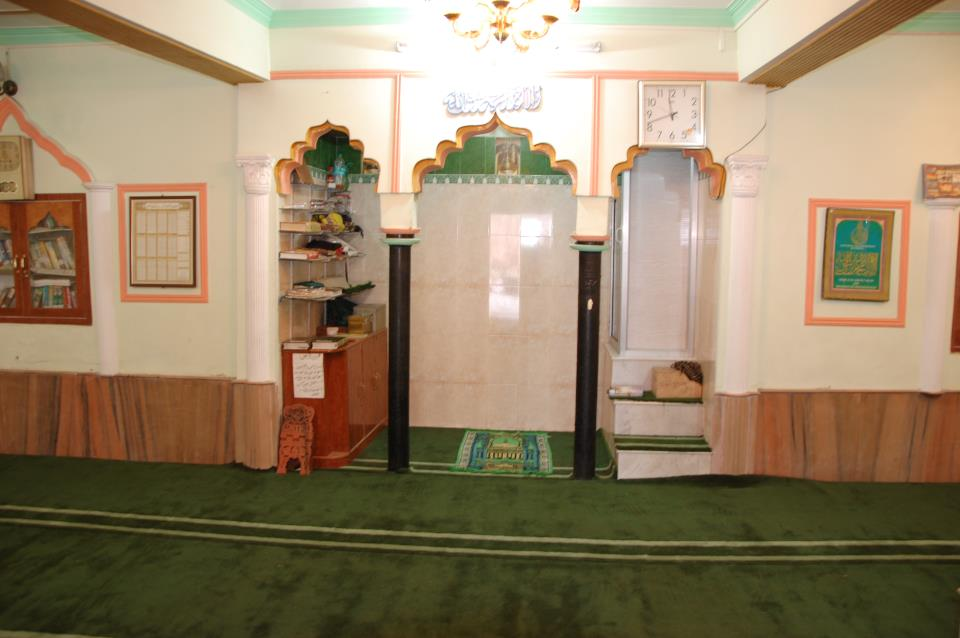
- Interior of the mosque

- Location of the mosque in Himachal Pradesh

Religion
- Affiliation: Islam
- Ecclesiastical or organizational status: Mosque
- Leadership: Muhammad Kamil Jamie (Imam)
- Status: Active

Location
- Location: Kotwali Bazar Road, Dharamshala, Himachal Pradesh
- Country: India
- Interactive map of Jama Mosque
- Coordinates: 32°13′11″N 76°19′08″E

Architecture
- Type: Mosque architecture
- Founder: Janab Ghulam Rasool
- Established: 1719
- Dome: One

The Jama Mosque (Arabic: مسجد الجمعة درمشالله) is a Friday mosque, located in Kotwali Bazar, Dharamshala, in the state of Himachal Pradesh, India.

== History ==
The Jama Masjid in Dharamshala was built by Janab Ghulam Rasool in the year 1719 CE. The 1905 Kangra earthquake damaged the mosque and its dome. At that time, Ahle Islam committee took charge and renovated the damaged part of the mosque and people started offering prayers regularly.

Between 1947 and 1995, there was only one mosque in the Yol cantonment where Salat-ul-jumuah (community prayer offered once a week at noon on every Friday) and Salatul Eieden prayers were organised. In 1995, the mosque Aman-e-Awam Welfare Committee was established and salah (obligatory five times prayer) continued in Jama Masjid. In the same year, Imam Muhammad Kamil Jamie Sb was appointed and he continues to be the imam of the mosque.

== See also ==
- Islam in India
- List of mosques in India
