= Naddi =

Village in Himachal Pradesh, India

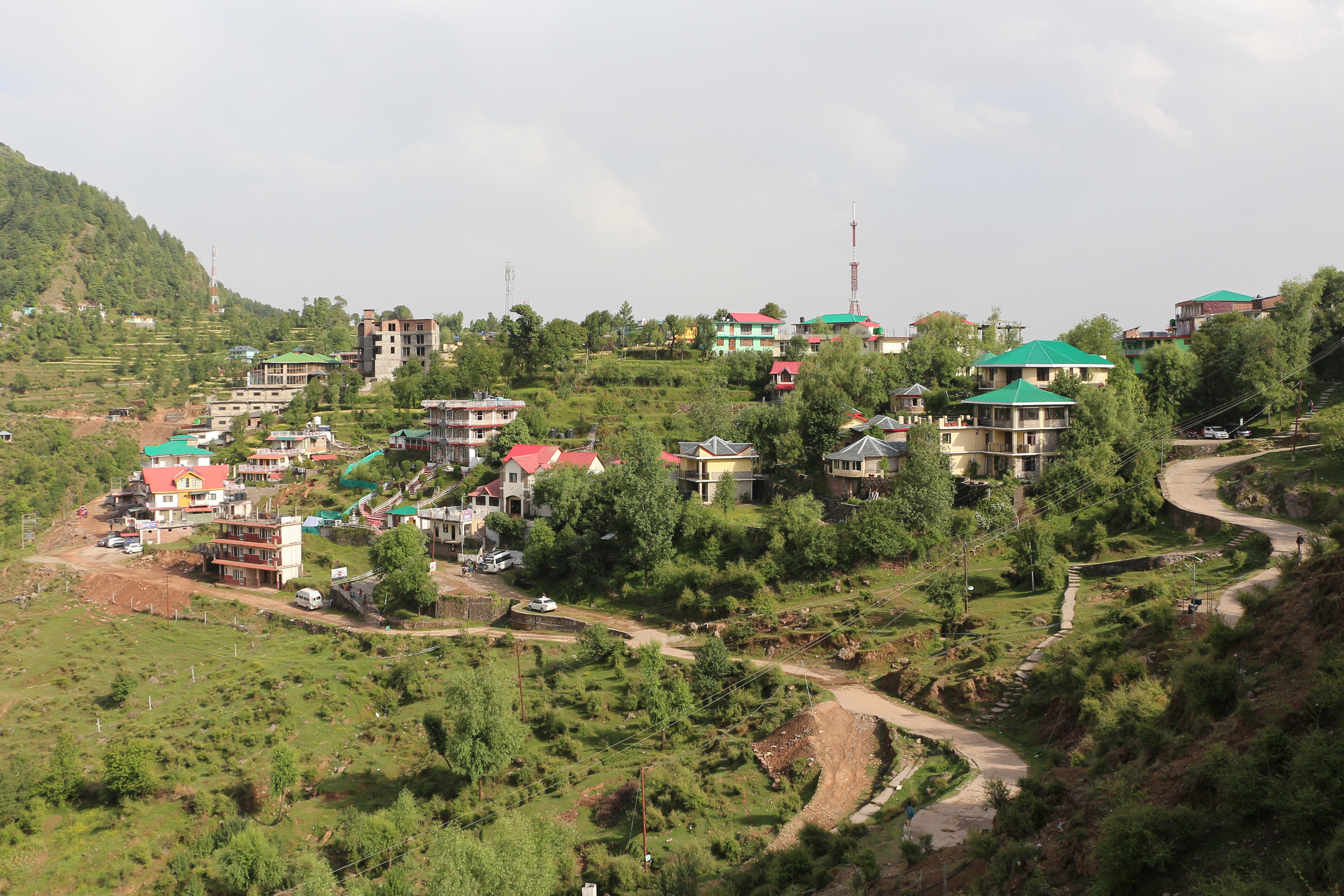
Village of Naddi

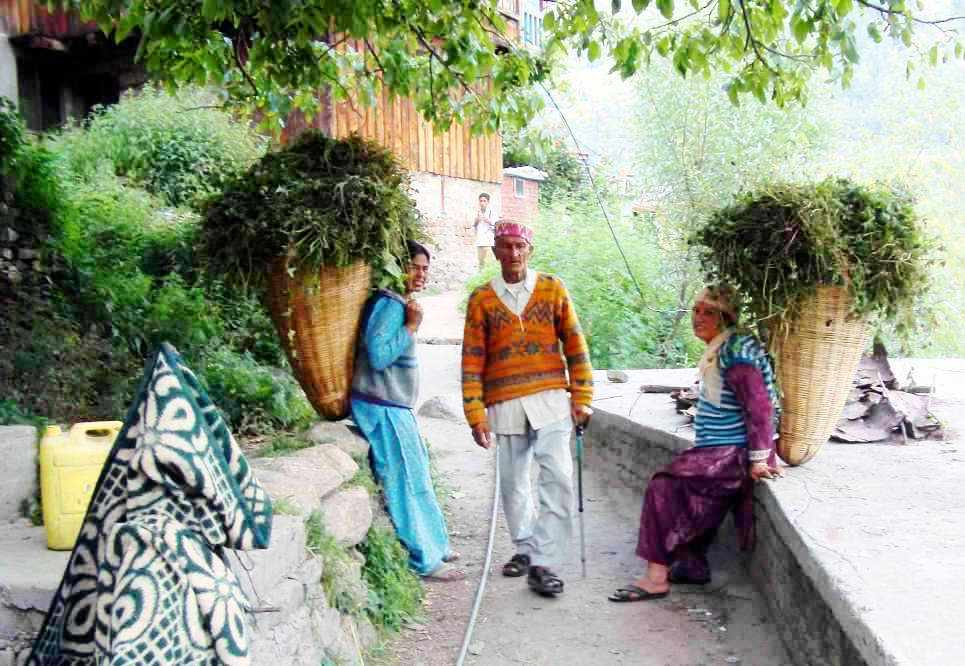
Gaddi people. Naddi Village, Dharamsala, HP

Naddi is a village in the Indian state of Himachal Pradesh. It is located at an altitude of 2,000 metres (6,600 ft) above sea level, in the upper reaches of the Kangra valley. The village is situated about 3 kilometres (1.9 mi) from Mc Leod Ganj, known worldwide for the presence of the Dalai Lama. On 29 April 1959, the 14th Dalai Lama (Tenzin Gyatso) established the Tibetan exile administration in the north Indian hill station of Mussoorie. In May 1960, the Central Tibetan Administration (CTA) was moved to Dharamshala.

== Culture ==
Most of the inhabitants are from the Gaddi tribe, and they speak the Gaddi language.

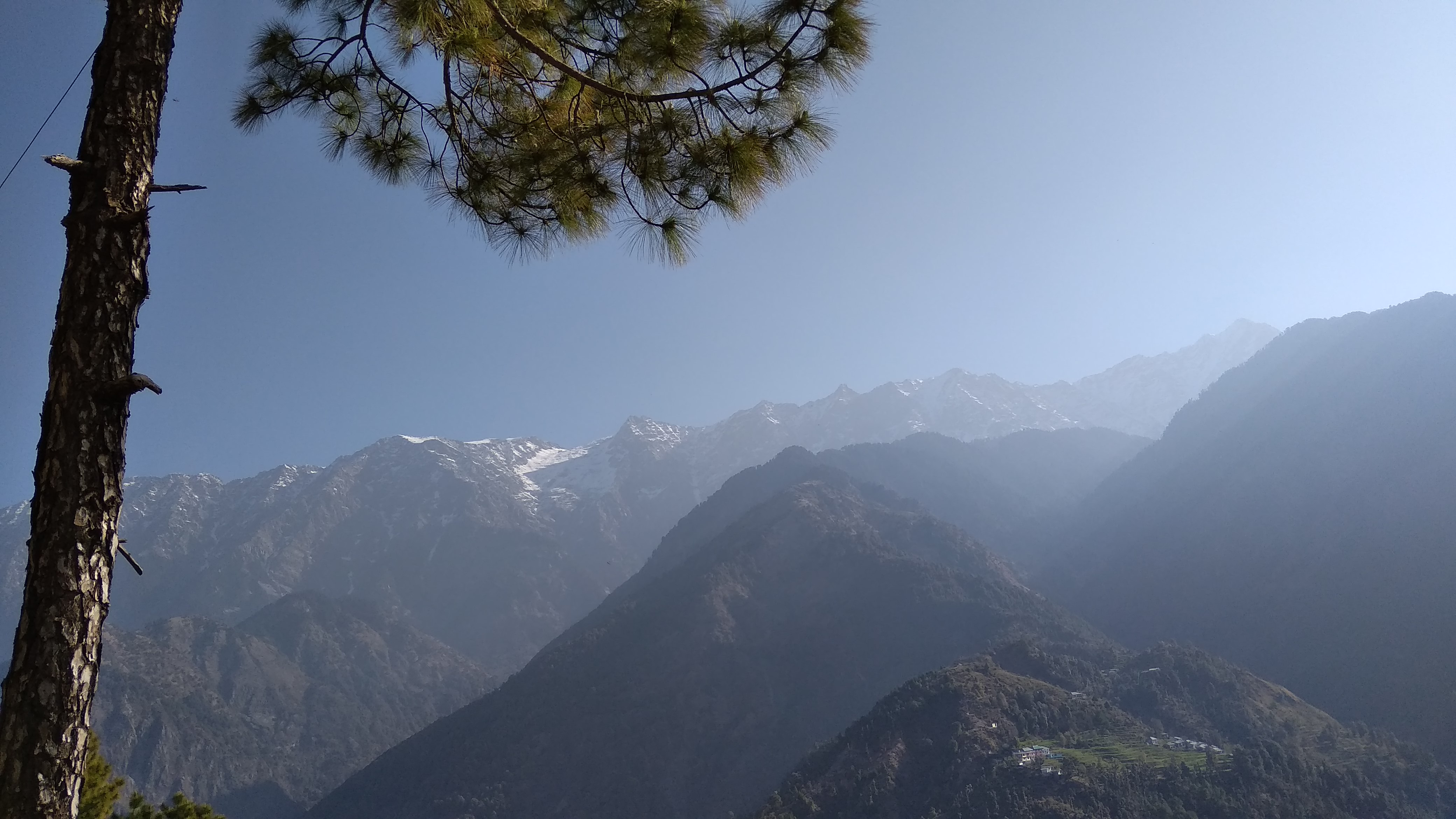
Dhauladhar mountains from Naddi, Himachal Pradesh

== Geography ==
Naddi has an average elevation of 2,000 metres (6,600 ft). Naddi is located in the Kangra valley, in the shadow of the Dhauladhar mountains. The village is accessible by road from Dharamshala and McLeod Ganj. Naddi is surrounded by pine, Himalayan oak (Quercus semecarpifolia), and rhododendron.

== Climate ==
Naddi has a monsoon-influenced humid subtropical climate (Cwa). Summer starts in early April, peaks in early June – when temperatures can reach 36 °C (97 °F) – and last until mid-June. From July to mid-September is the monsoon season when up to 3,000 mm (120 in) of rainfall can be experienced. Autumn is mild and lasts from October to the end of November.

Autumn temperatures average around 16–17 °C (61–63 °F). Winter starts in December and continues until late February. Snow and sleet are common during the winter in Naddi. Winter is followed by a short, pleasant spring until April. Historically, the Dhauladhar mountains used to remain snow-covered all year long, however, in recent years they have been losing their snow blanket during dry spells.

The best times to visit are the autumn and spring months.

== Trekkings ==
Naddi is a starting point for a number of trekkings. A 3-kilometre (1.9 mi) amble takes one to McLeod Ganj on down ward, another 3-kilometre (1.9 mi) walk leads to the village of Dharamkot on down ward. Naddi have Dal Lake. Naddi is have Guna mata Track and Gulla Mata Track also. If one wishes to go on a longer walk then he/she can trek 8-kilometre (5.0 mi) to Triund. The snow line of Ilaqa Got is just a 5-kilometre (3.1 mi) walk from Triund. Kareri Lake is another famous trekking destination. Naddi also has a Sunset point.
