= Kangra tea =

Tea from the Kangra valley in India

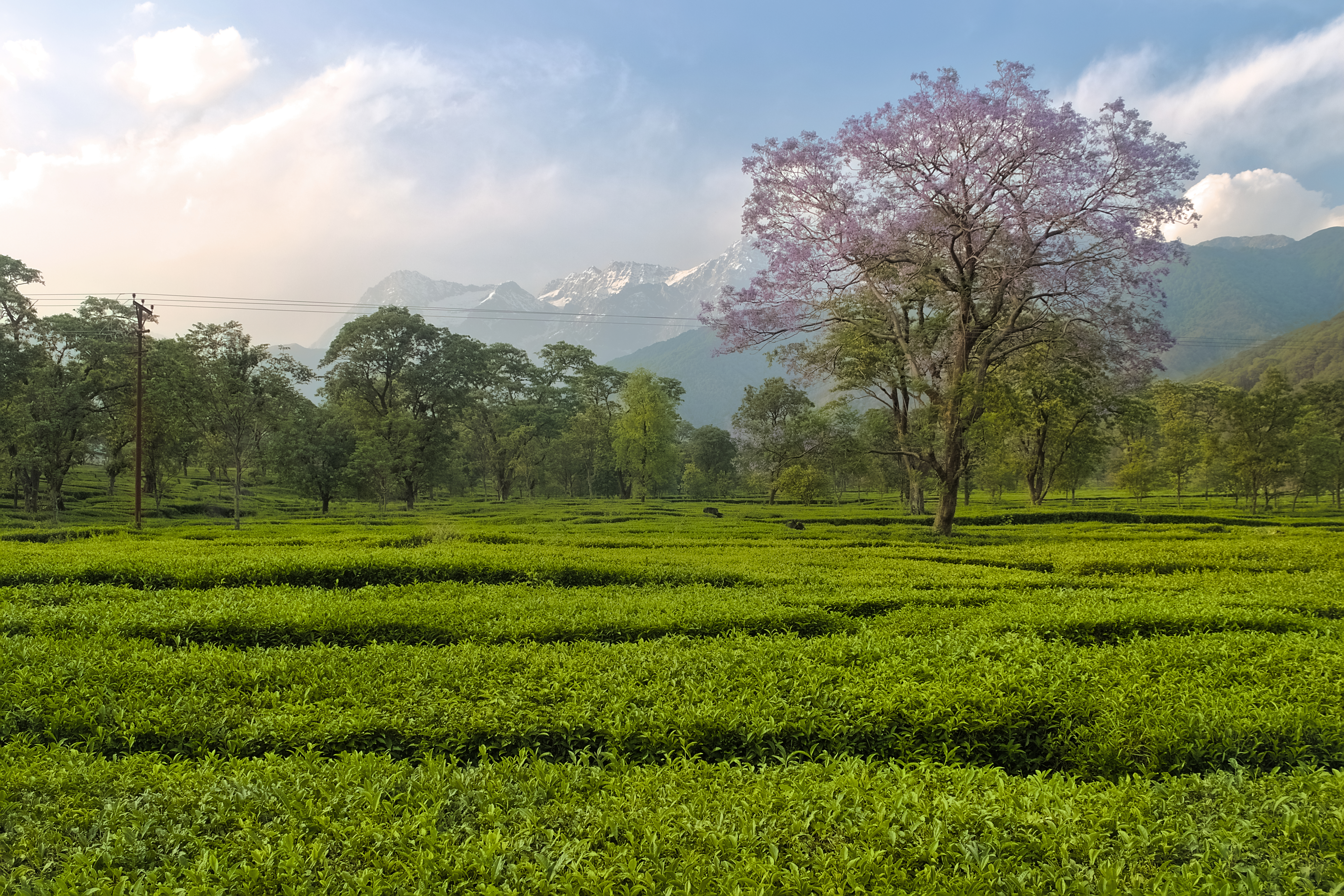
A tea plantation near Palampur in the Kangra Valley.

Kangra tea is a tea from the Kangra Valley in the northern Indian state of Himachal Pradesh. The tea is known for its distinct colour and flavour. Both black and green tea have been produced in the Kangra Valley since the mid-19th century. Production peaked in the late 19th century when the tea became popular for use in northwestern India and for export to Central Asia, but dipped after devastation from an earthquake in 1905. Attempts have been made in the late 20th and early 21st centuries to revive production. Kangra tea was given the Geographical Indication status in 2005.

== History ==
Tea was first grown in the Kangra region in the mid-19th century. After a feasibility survey in 1848 showed the area of being suitable for tea plantation, a Chinese variety of Camellia sinensis was planted across the region. The production turned out to be successful in Palampur and Dharamshala, despite failing in other locations. By the 1880s, the Kangra tea was considered to be superior to tea from other places, and was bought in Kabul and Central Asia. In 1882, the Kangra District Gazette described Kangra tea as "superior to that produced in any other part of India." In 1886 and 1895, the tea received gold and silver medals at International conventions held in London and Amsterdam.

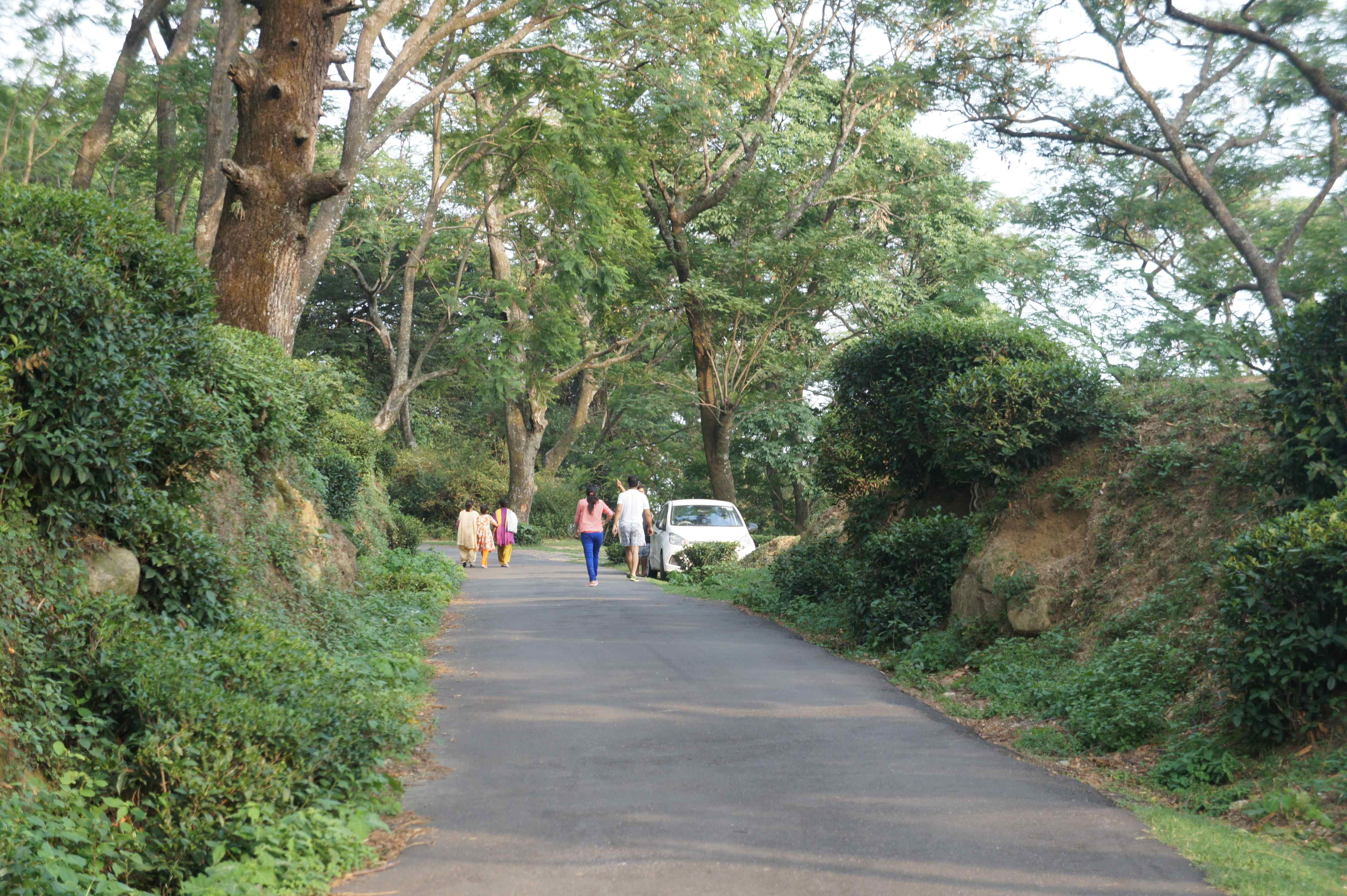
Locals and tourists alike take walks through a tea estate in Dharamsala.

However, the 1905 Kangra earthquake caused thousands of deaths and destruction of factories, forcing the British to sell the plantations and leave the area. In the decades that followed, only small quantities of Kangra tea were produced by the new owners.

After a further decline of produce in the 21st century, research and techniques are being promoted, aimed at reviving the brand by increasing the produce. In 2012, the then Union Minister for Commerce & Industry, Anand Sharma, laid the foundation stone for the Palampur regional office of the Tea Board of India, marking a significant step towards the re-integration of the Kangra region into the mainstream of the Indian tea industry.

== Description ==
Although Kangra cultivates both black tea and green tea, black tea constitutes around 90 percent of the production. As of May 2015, there are 5,900 tea gardens in the area covering about 2,312 hectares of land between Dharamsala, Shahpur, Palampur, Baijnath and Jogindernagar; with an annual output of 8.99 lakh kg.

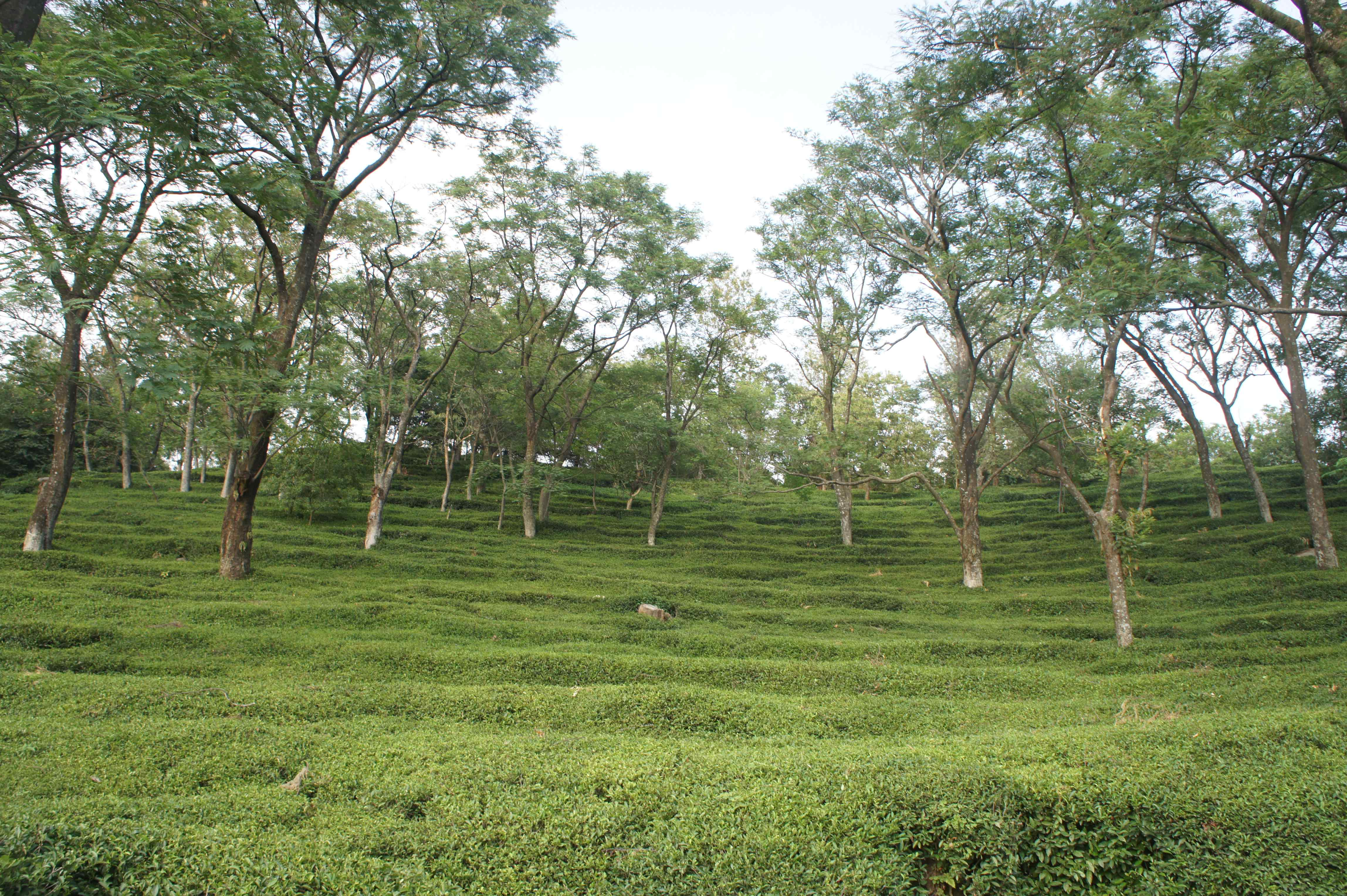
Mann Tea Estate, owned by Dharmsala Tea Company, located in Dharamsala, Himachal Pradesh, about half an hour from McLeodganj.

Kangra tea is known for its unique color and flavor.While the black tea has a sweet lingering after taste, the green tea has a delicate woody aroma. The unique characteristics of the tea is attributed to the geographical properties of the region. It was granted the Geographical Indication tag in 2005 by Office of the Controller-General of Patents, Designs and Trademarks, Chennai, as per Geographical Indications of Goods (Registration and Protection) Act, 1999.

Kangra tea is sought after mainly for its unique flavour. The Chinese hybrid variety grown produces a very pale liquor, which is the reason why Kangra does not produce any CTC (crushed, turned, curled) tea—the staple tea of India.

== Tea tourism ==
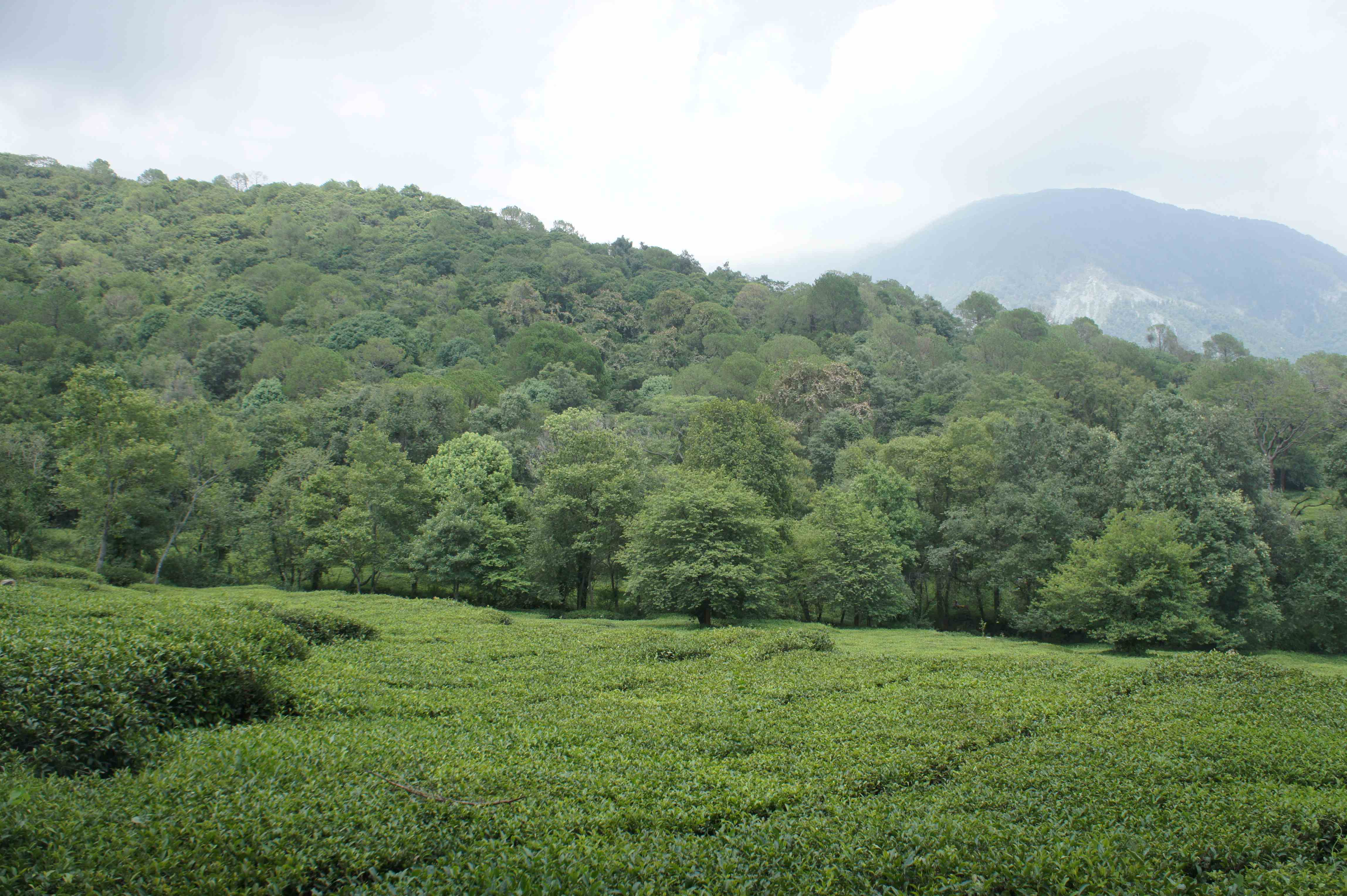
Towa Tea Estate, owned by Dharmsala Tea Company, lies at an altitude of over 6,500 ft.

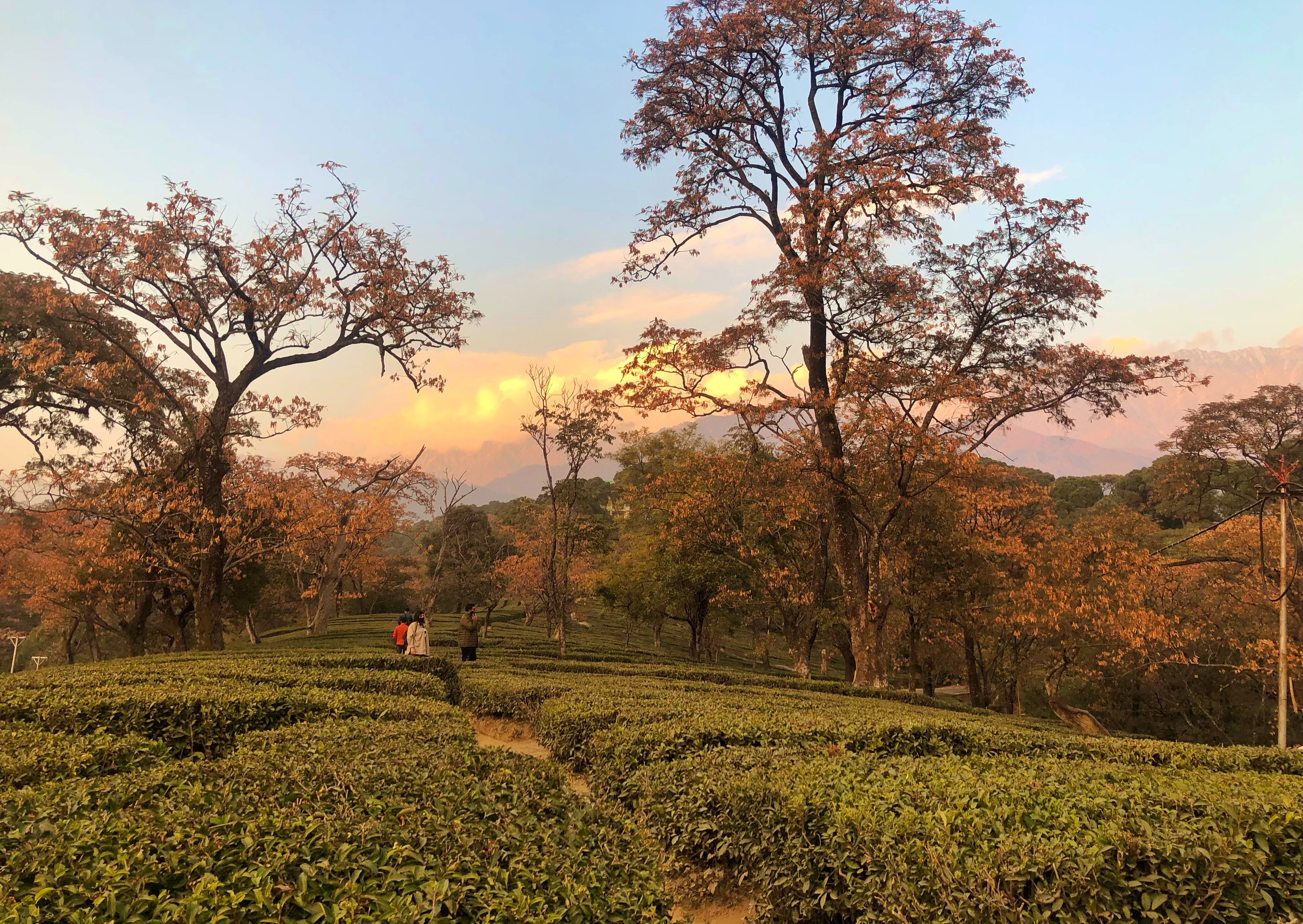
Tea garden in Dharamsala at sunset

Tea tourism is slowly beginning to gain ground in and around Kangra. Several of the tea estates and tea factories in Palampur and Dharamsala offer factory tours as well as home stays for those interested in learning more about the tea. Wah Tea Estate in Palampur offers an in-depth guided tea tour and tea tasting session. The Dharmsala Tea Company offers guided tours of its factory and tea gardens, starting from its factory in Mann Tea Estate. Similarly, the Palampur Cooperative Tea Factory offers factory tours and homestays.

== See also ==
- Darjeeling tea
- Nilgiri tea
- Assam tea
- Tea Board of India
- Kangra Valley
