= Peepal Farm =

NGO in Dharamshala, India

Peepal Farm is a not for profit, non-governmental organisation located in Dhanotu village, nearby Dharamshala in Himachal Pradesh, India. The group works for the improvement of life conditions of the stray animal population, especially cows and dogs, and raising public awareness against animal cruelty and for veganism.

== History ==
Peepal Farm was started in December 2014 by Robin Singh in Himachal Pradesh's Dhanotu village near the Dharamsala Town, who was then joined by the second co-founder Shivani Singh.

Immediately before, both were running a sterilisation program for stray dogs in New Delhi. The idea stemmed from the limitations of animal welfare work, and they decided to do it in a way that involves and inspires others. In the year 2015, once the primary construction was complete, the farm was open to people to volunteer and work in exchange for lodging and vegan meals. Since that time, the farm has helped many animals heal, find homes or die peacefully.

As the only place where large animals can recover in the area, the local administration has regularly referred cases to Peepal Farm since 2017. In the animal recovery centre approximately 30 animals are in recovery at any time. Both traditional medicines like Ayurveda and modern allopathy are used for treatment. The farm produces organic products. Volunteers organise art projects to spread awareness of the importance of kindness towards animals.
