= Hari Kothi =

Historic property

Hari Kothi is a historic property located in Dharamshala, India. It is constructed in the traditional Himalayan technique of ‘dhajji’ and is one of the oldest buildings in the region.

== Description ==
Hari Kothi, named after the Hindu deity Vishnu, is a historic property in Dharamshala, India. Swami Vivekananda stayed here during his visit to the hill station in 1887. The estate was bought by Raja Brij Mohan Pal (1890–1937) of Kutlehar state in the name of his wife Rani Ratten Dei of Chamba state, after their marriage, from an English owner. Raja Mahendra Pal of Kutlehar was born in this house. Hari Kothi continues to remain the summer residence of the descendants of the royal family of Kutlehar. Raja Rupendra Pal of Kutlehar converted parts of this property into a hotel.

Hari Kothi is constructed in the traditional Himalayan technique of ‘dhajji’ and is one of the oldest buildings in the region. The estate has been the hub of social activity for over a century, and has hosted several Heads of State, Princes, Princesses and other guests.

All the rooms in Hari Kothi have wooden flooring, antique furniture, photographs from royal India and objects of historic significance. The four acre gardens are home to a number of species of Himalayan birds and plants, a natural water spring and have views of the Kangra valley.
