= Alfred Hallett =

English painter

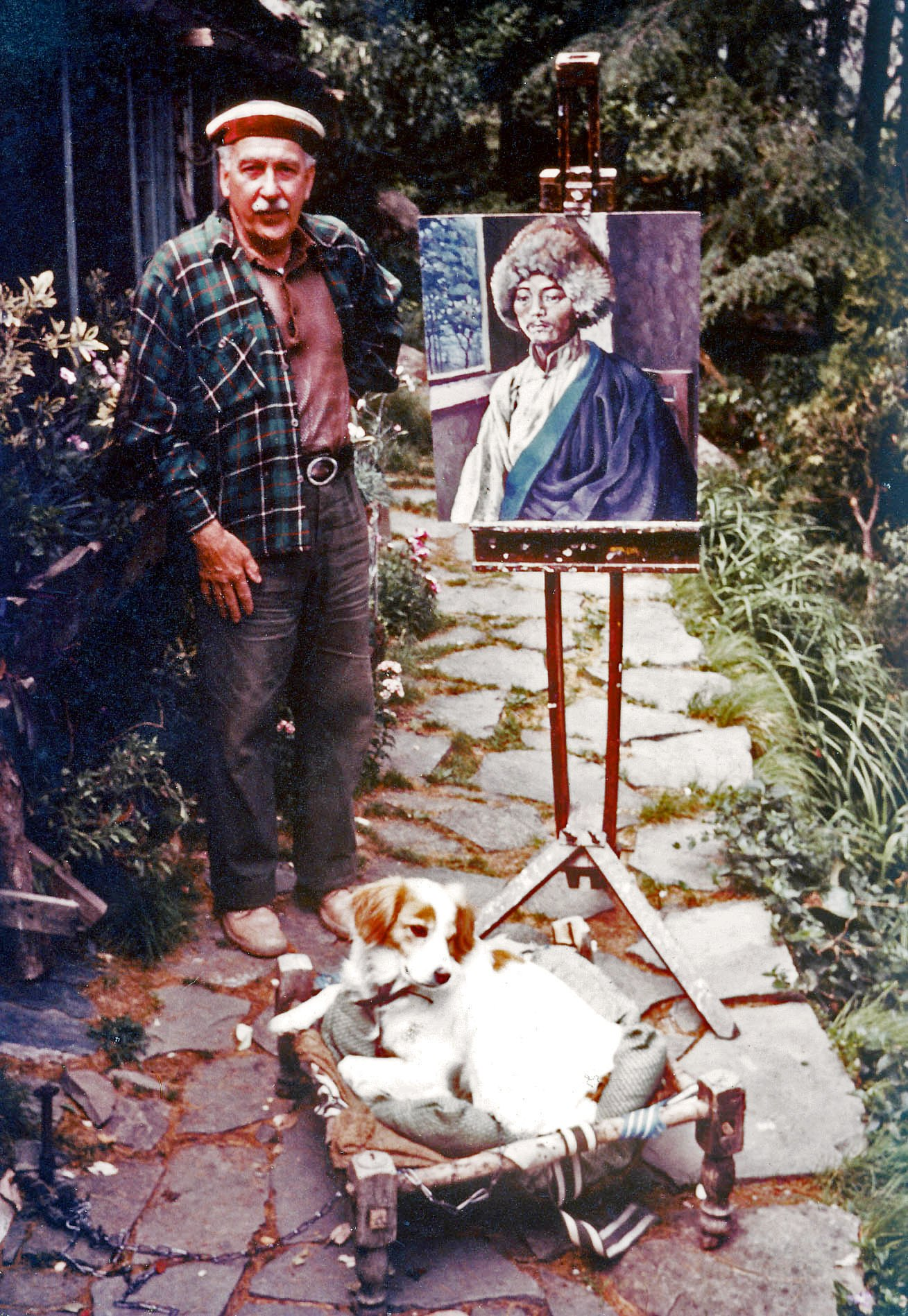
Alfred Hallett at home in Dharamkot with painting of Tibetan friend, c. 1980.

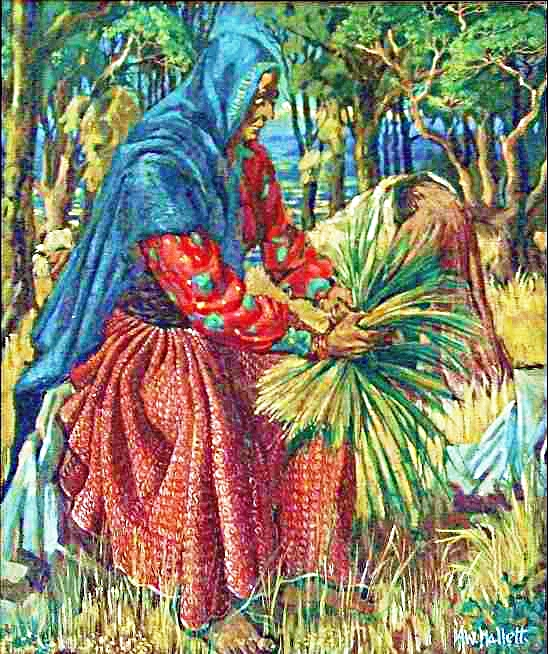
Gaddi Woman Cutting Grass by Alfred Hallett c. 1980

Alfred W. Hallett (1914–1986) was an English painter, who spent most of his adult life in north India.

== Life ==
=== Early life ===
Hallett wanted to study art from the time he was young but his parents were members of the Exclusive Brethren sect and his mother faced excommunication for encouraging him. He studied in London, and exhibited in two Summer Exhibitions in 1937 and 1939 at the Royal Academy, London, although he never became a Royal Academician.

=== India ===
In 1938, he was invited to India to paint by the Kashmiri owner of Nedou's Hotel in Srinigar. He offered his services to the British Government during World War II, but refused to take up arms. He was given a job as a censor, and rose to the position of Chief Censor in the Punjab.

He became the manager of sales and design after the war for the New Egerton Woollen Mills (established in 1880) in Dhariwal, Punjab, which produced woollen worsted and hosiery of all kinds. He was close friends with the accountant, Kim Butterworth and his wife Jean.

After the end of the war, Hallett decided to stay in India. After the Partition of India in 1947 he and the Butterworth family frequently went on camping trips together in the mountains during the summers. They finally bought a church property previously used for furloughs by missionaries at Dharamkot, set amongst snow-capped mountains in beautiful deodar forests, well above McLeod Ganj, Dharamsala, at an altitude of about 2,200 metres (7,218 feet).

He was a keen gardener and developed a friendship with the 14th Dalai Lama with whom he used to share cuttings, seeds and gardening tips. In later years he repaired a lovely stone cottage, known as "Carlton Cottage" on his property which he rented to foreigners to generate some income. The house had been built by a retired English Major in the 1840s, who had originally tried to establish a strawberry farm nearby, but it was badly damaged in the massive and deadly 1905 Kangra earthquake.

He died at his home in Dharamkot on 26 April 1986.

== Work ==
Hallett was well known for his portraits, landscape and flower paintings some of which are exhibited at the Naam Art Gallery in the small rural locality of Sidhbari, near Dharamshala in the Indian state of Himachal Pradesh. He also painted imaginative religious and abstract paintings, some of which may be seen in the Catholic Church and school in Amritsar.

== Gallery ==
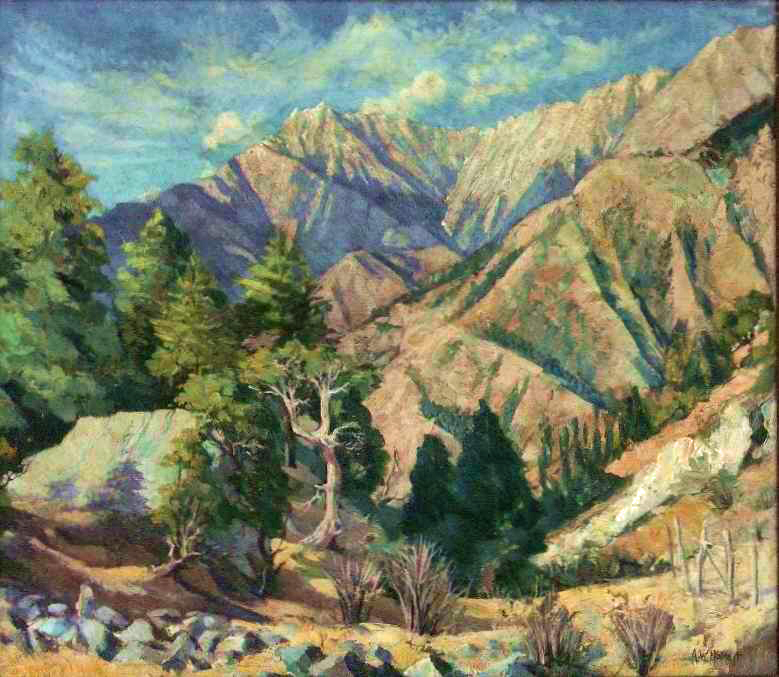
Dhauladhar Range looking west from Dharmakot, Dharamsala

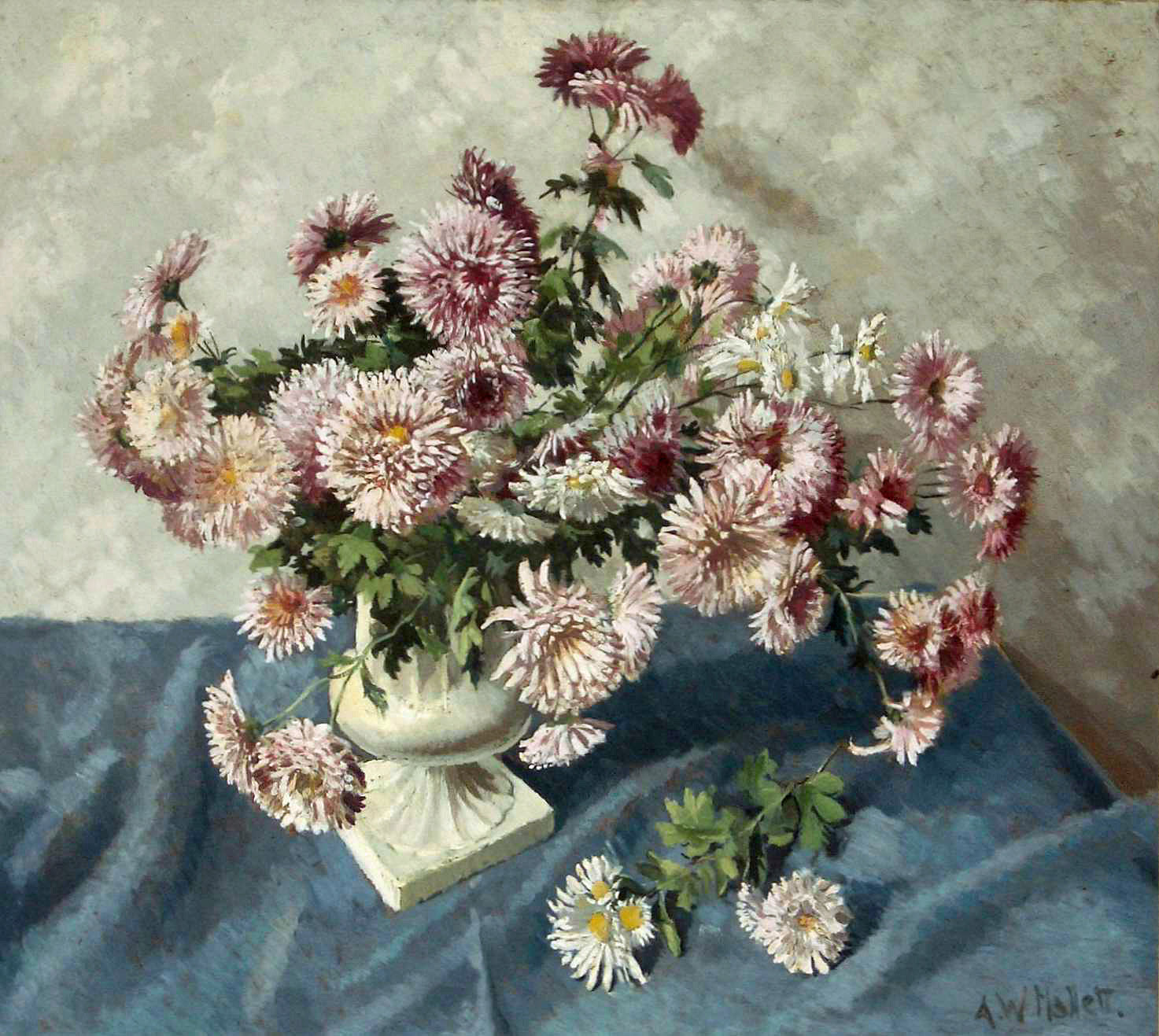
Chrysanthemums by Alfred Hallett c. 1980

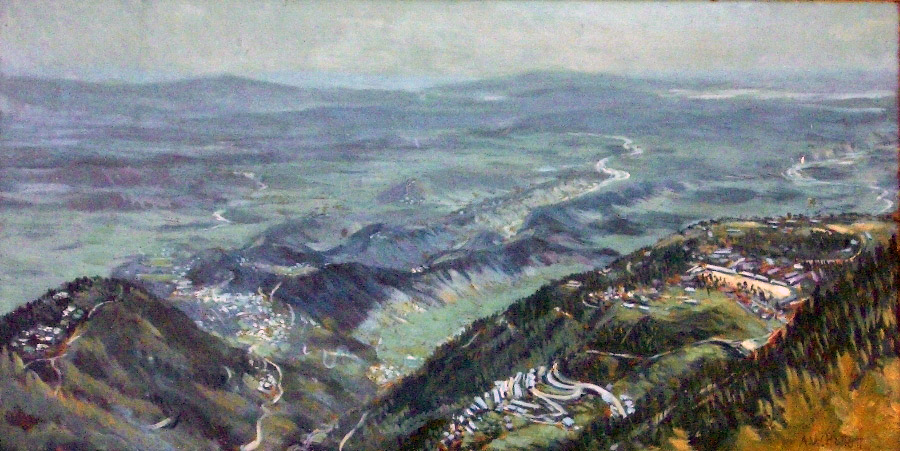
Looking down over Dharamsala and Beas River. Sketch

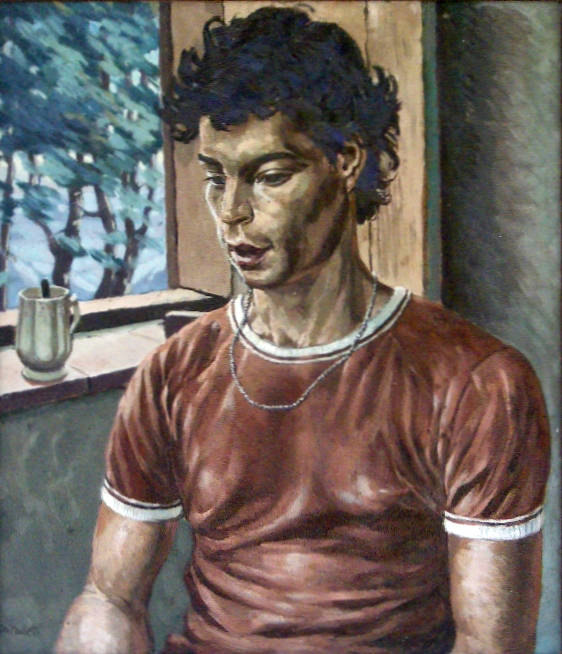
Portrait of young man. 1980
