= Dharamshala =

Winter capital of Himachal Pradesh, India

Dharamshala Dharamsala
- Town
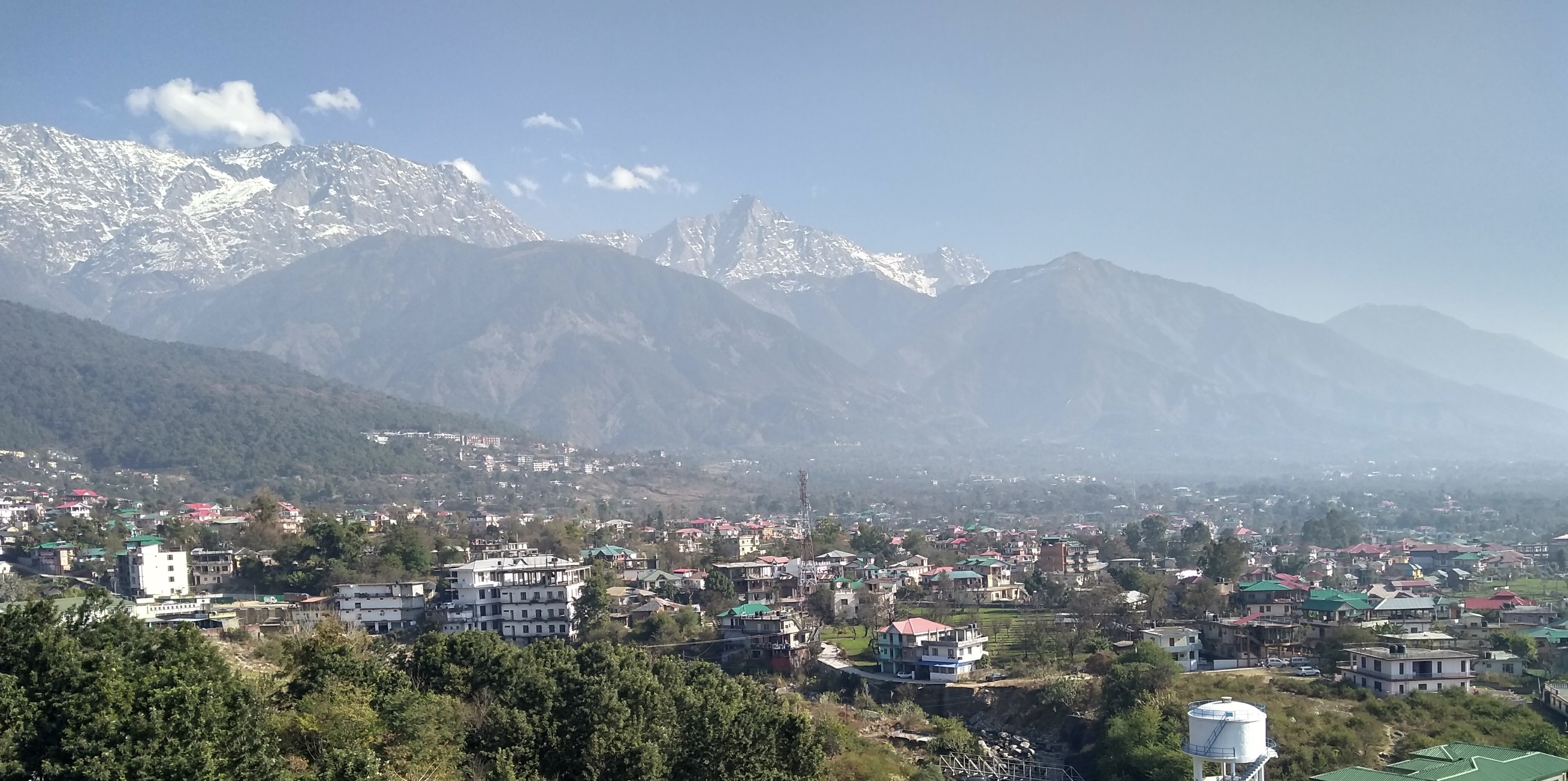
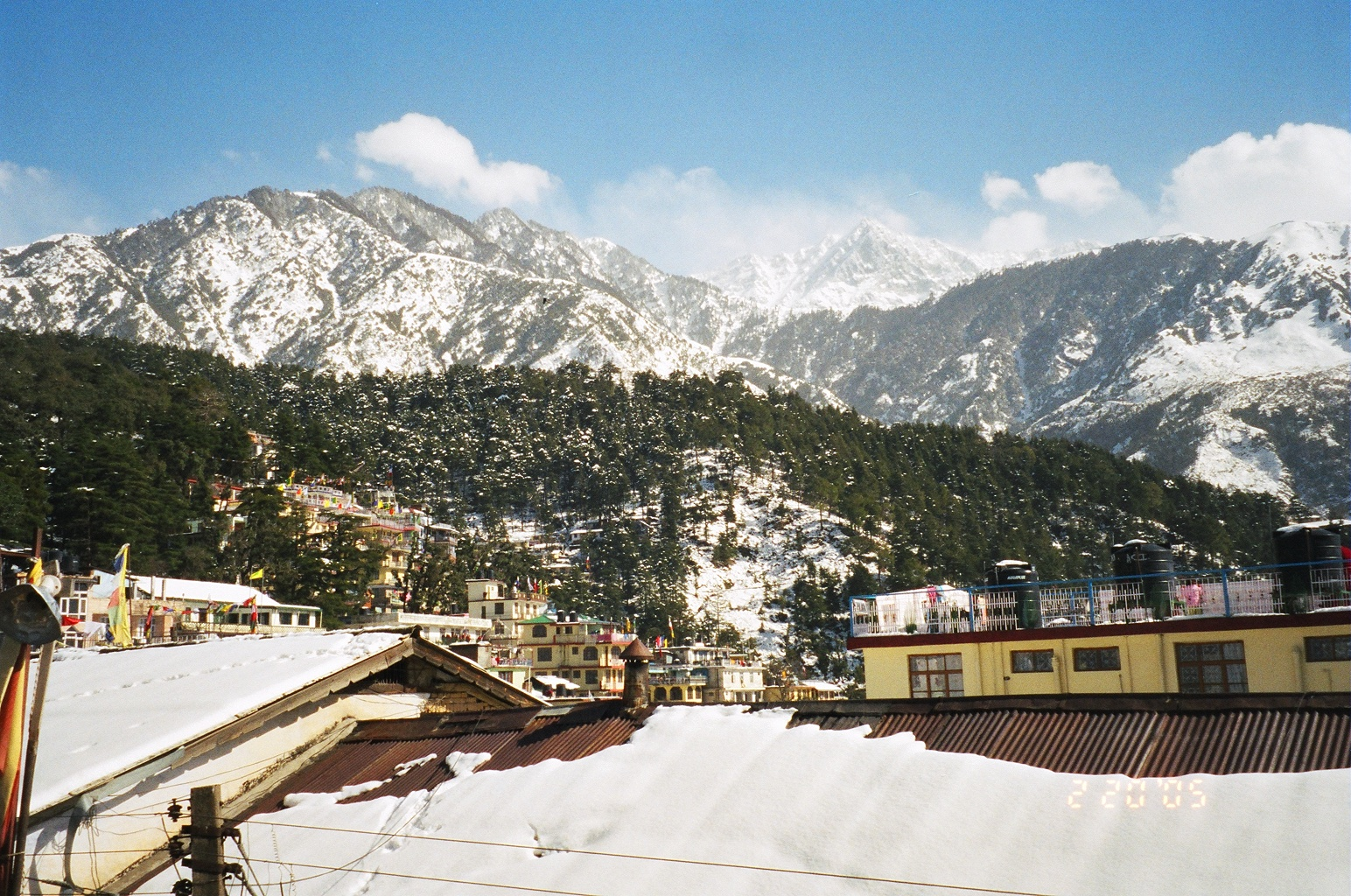
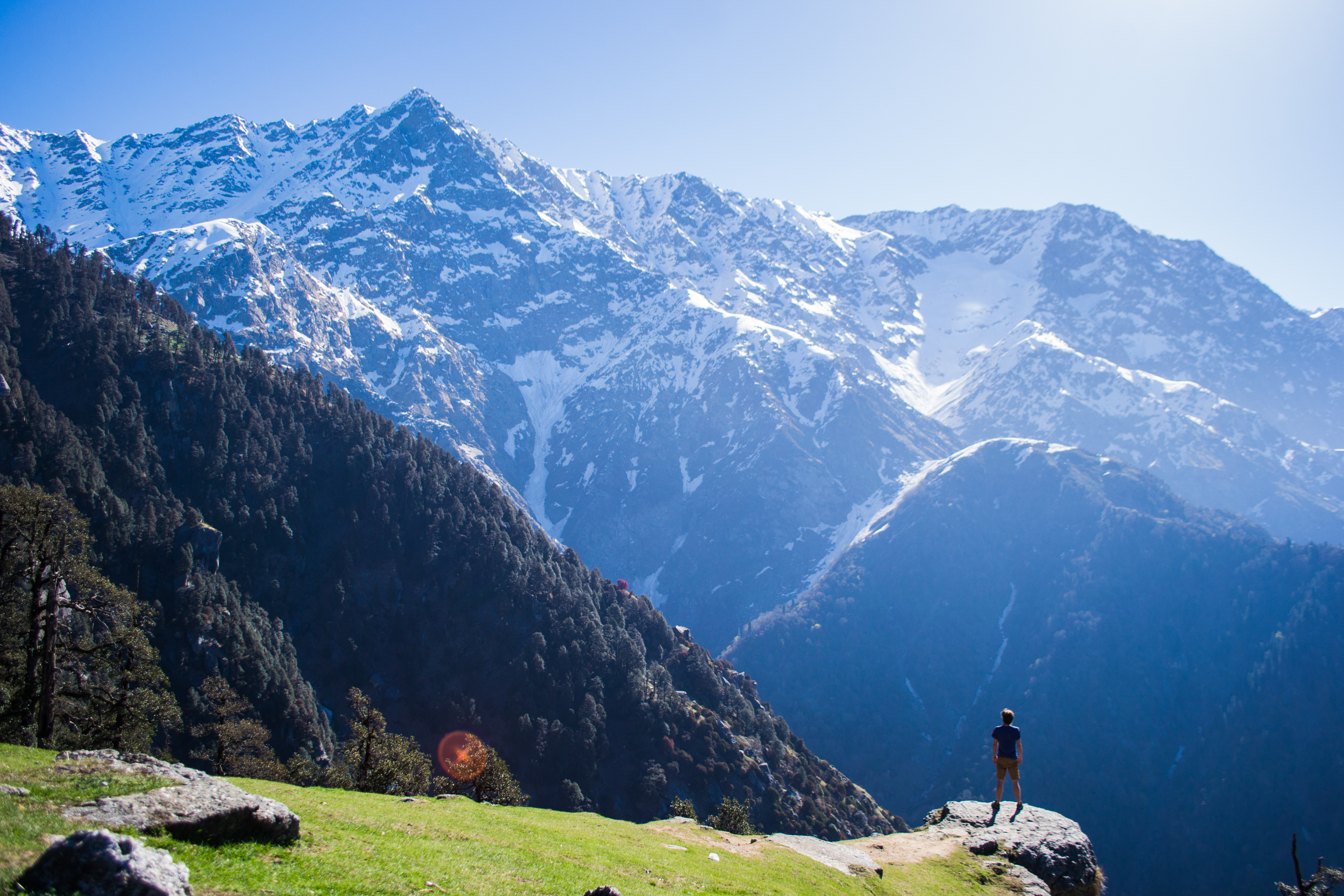
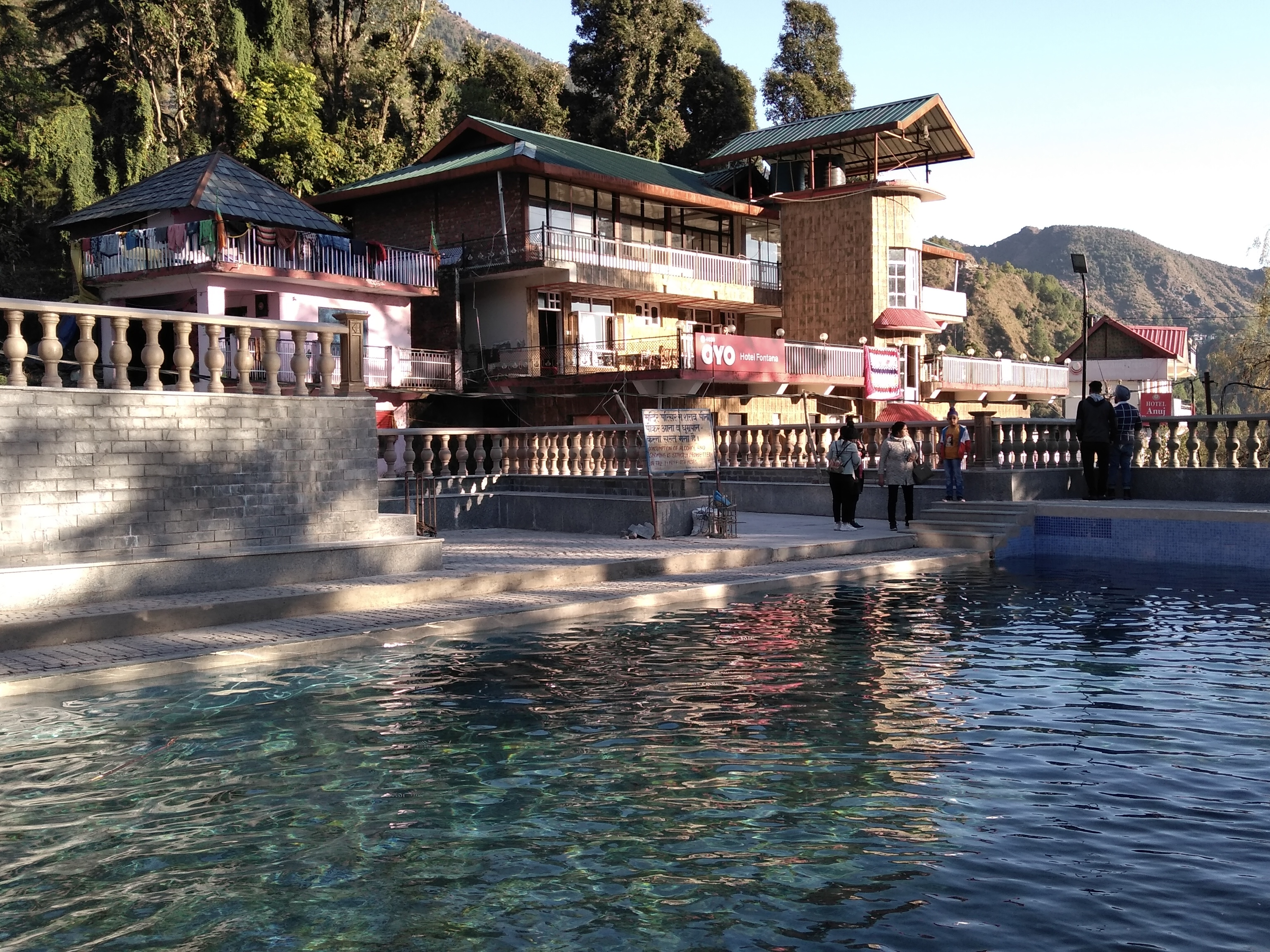
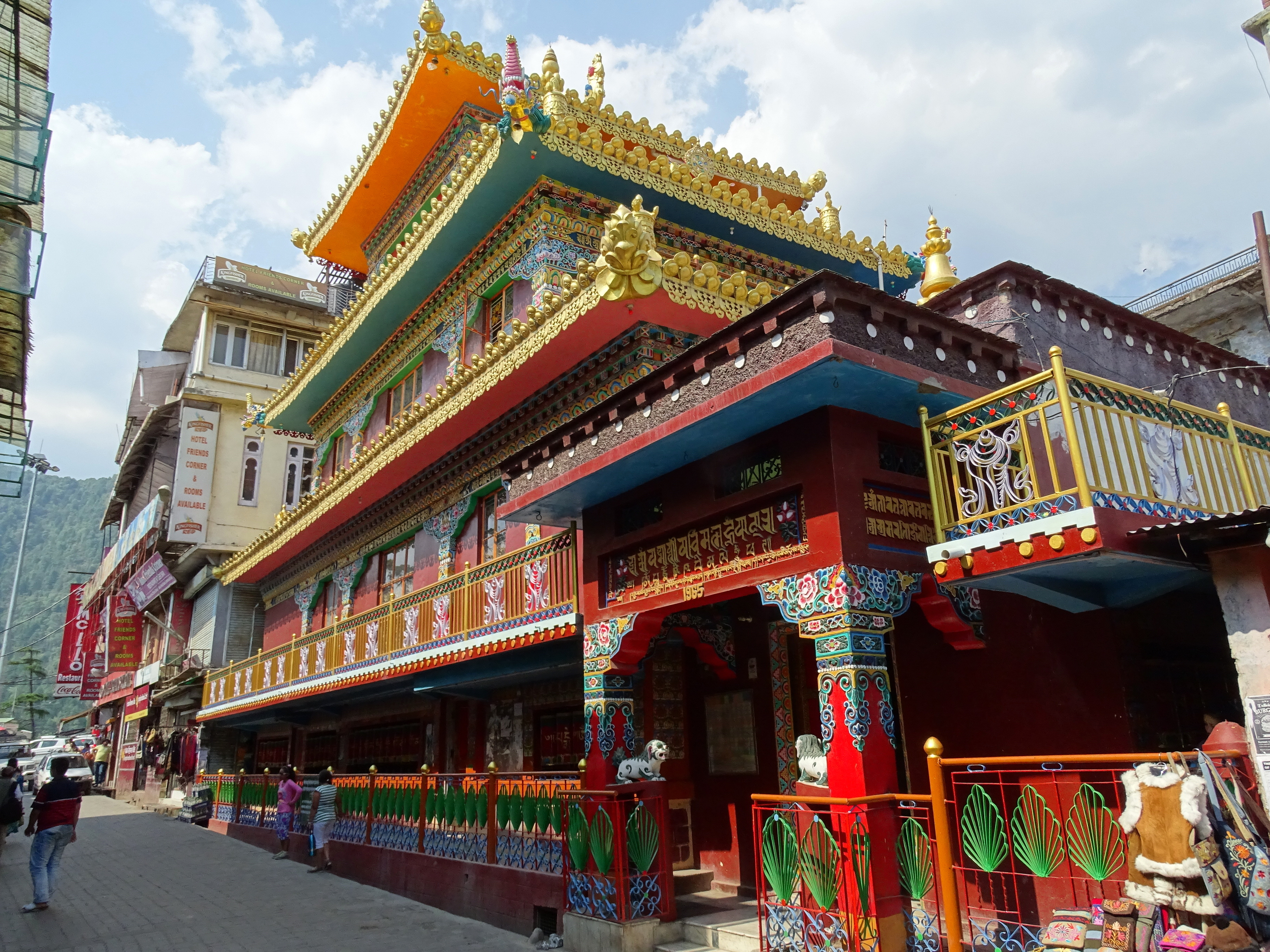
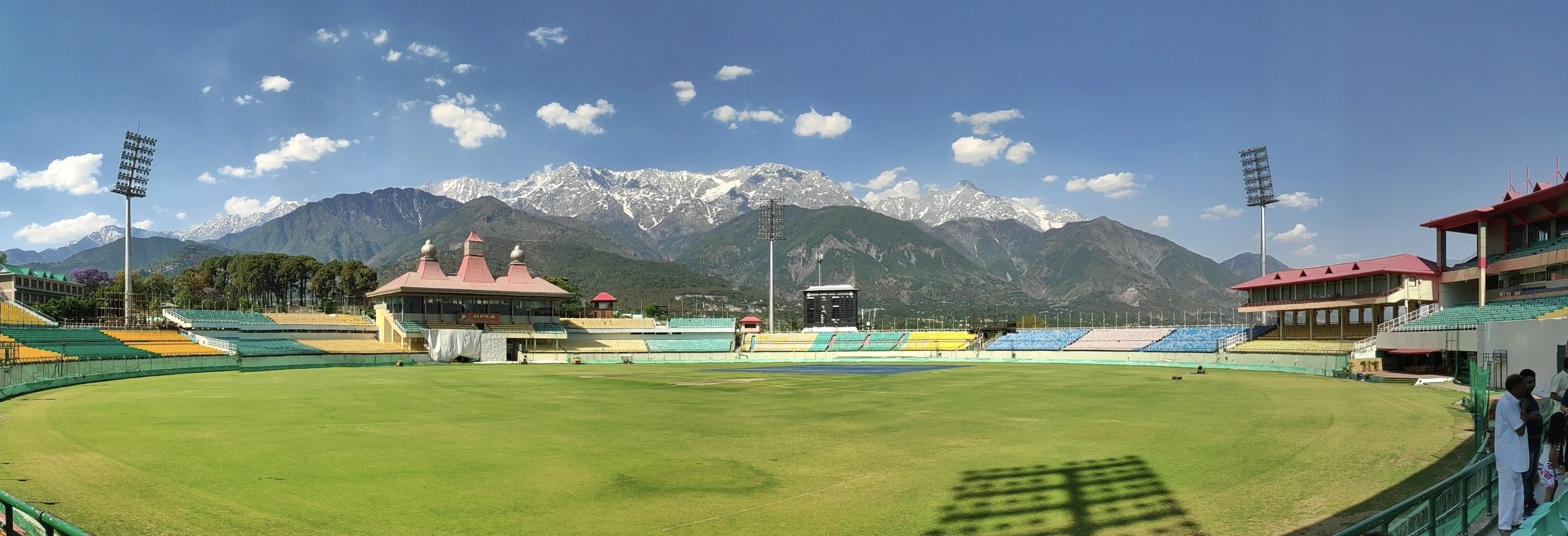
- From top, left to right: Skyline of Dharamsala, Mcleodganj during winter, Triund, Bhagsunag Temple, Kalachakra Temple, HPCA Stadium
- Nickname: Dhasa
- Location within the Indian state of Himachal Pradesh Location within India
- Coordinates: 32°12′55″N 76°19′07″E
- Country: India
- State: Himachal Pradesh
- District: Kangra
- Named for: Derives its name from an old Hindu sanctuary, called Dharamsàla which once stood there.
- Member of legislative Assembly: Sudhir Sharma

Government
  - Type: Municipal Corporation
  - Body: Dharamshala Municipal Corporation
  - Mayor: Onkar Singh Nehria

Area
  - Total: 81.60 km^{2} (31.51 sq mi)
- Elevation: 1,457 m (4,780 ft)

Population (2024)
  - Total: 53,543
  - Rank: 2nd in HP
  - Density: 656.2/km^{2} (1,699/sq mi)

Languages
  - Official: Hindi
  - Native: Pahari (Palampuri Kangri)
- Time zone: UTC+5:30 (IST)
- PIN: 176 215
- Telephone code: +91- 01892
- Vehicle registration: HP- 39(RLA), 68(RTO), 01D/02D(Taxi)
- Climate: Cwa
- Website: edharamshala.in

Dharamshala (/ˈdɑːrəmʃɑːlə/, Hindi: [d̪ʱərmʃaːlaː]; also spelled Dharamsala) is a town in the Indian state of Himachal Pradesh. It serves as the winter capital of the state and the administrative headquarters of the Kangra district since 1855. Since 1960, the town has hosted the 14th Dalai Lama and the Tibetan government-in-exile.

The town is located in the Kangra Valley, in the shadow of the Dhauladhar range of the Himalayas at an altitude of 1,457 metres (4,780 ft). Upper Dharamshala, located at an elevation of approximately 1,830 metres, is home to the official residence and headquarters of the 14th Dalai Lama. This area, which includes the well-known suburbs of McLeod Ganj and Forsyth Ganj, still reflects a distinctly colonial character, echoing its British-era legacy. In contrast, Lower Dharamshala, situated at around 1,380 metres, has evolved into a bustling commercial hub, serving as the town's primary centre for trade and business.

The economy of the region is highly dependent on agriculture and tourism. The town is now a major hill station and spiritual centre.

As of 2024, Dharamshala is the second most populous city in Himachal Pradesh, with a population of approximately 53,543, ranking only after the state capital, Shimla.

== Etymology ==
Dharamshala (Devanagari: धर्मशाला; ITRANS: Dharmashala; IAST: Dharmaśālā) is a Hindi word derived from Sanskrit that is a compound of the words dharma (धर्म) and shālā (शाला), literally 'House or place of Dharma'. In common usage, the word refers to a shelter or rest house for spiritual pilgrims. When permanent settlements were established in the region, there was one such rest house from which the settlement took its name.

Due to a lack of uniform observance of conventions for Hindi transcription and transliteration of the script used to write it, Devanagari, the name of the town has been variously romanised in English and other languages as Dharamshala, Dharamsala, Dharmshala and Dharmsala. These four permutations result from two variables: the transcription of the word धर्म (dharma)—particularly the second syllable (र्म) and that of the third syllable (शा). A strict transliteration of धर्म as written would be 'dharma' [ˈdʱərmə]. In the modern spoken Hindi of the region, there is a common metathesis in which the vowel and consonant sounds in the second syllable of certain words (including धर्म) are transposed, which changes 'dharma' to 'dharam' pronounced somewhere between [ˈdʱərəm] and [ˈdʱərm]. Regarding the third syllable, the Devanagari श corresponds to the English sh sound, [ʃ] and thus शाला is transcribed in English as 'shala'. Therefore, the most accurate phonetic transcription of the Hindi धर्मशाला into Roman script for common (non-technical) English usage is either 'Dharamshala' or, less commonly, 'Dharmshala', both of which render the sh (/ʃ/) sound of श in English as 'sh' to convey the correct native pronunciation, 'Dharamshala' [dʱərəmˈʃaːlaː] or 'Dharmshala' ([dʱərmˈʃaːlaː]). Regardless of spelling variations, the correct native pronunciation is with the sh sound (/ʃ/).

== History ==
=== Early history ===
References to Dharamshala and its surrounding areas are found in ancient Hindu scriptures such as Rig Veda and Mahabharata. There are mentions of the region by Pāṇini in 4th century BC and by Chinese traveller Xuanzang during the reign of king Harshavardhana in 7th century AD. The indigenous people of the Dharamshala area (and the surrounding region) are the Gaddis, a predominantly Hindu group who traditionally lived a nomadic or semi-nomadic transhumant lifestyle.

The region was subject to attacks from Mughal rulers Mahmud of Ghazni in 1009 and Firuz Shah Tughlaq in 1360. In 1566, Akbar captured the region and brought it under the Mughal rule. As the Mughal rule disintegrated, Sikh chieftain Jai Singh brought the region to his control and gave it to Sansar Chand of the Katoch dynasty, legitimate Rajput prince in 1785. Gurkhas invaded and captured the region in 1806 before being defeated by Ranjit Singh in 1809. The Katoch dynasty was reduced to the status of jagirdars under the treaty of Jawalamukhi signed between Chand and Singh in 1810. Post the death of Chand, Ranjit Singh annexed the region into the Sikh empire.

=== British occupation ===
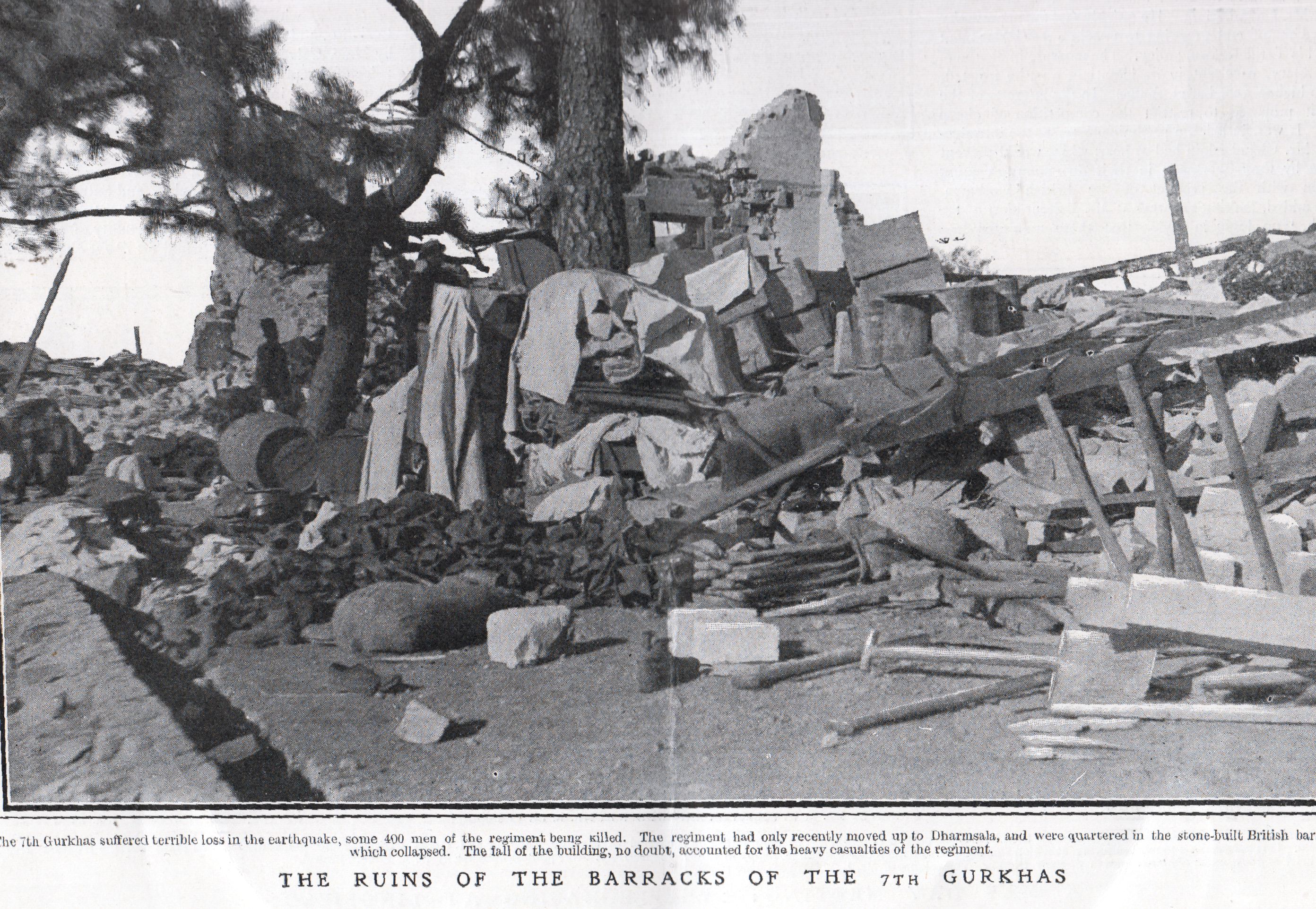
Destroyed barracks of the Gurkha Rifles after the 1905 Kangra earthquake

The East India Company captured the region following the First Anglo-Sikh War of 1846. Under the British Raj, the regions were part of the undivided British Indian province of the Punjab, and were ruled by the governors of Punjab from Lahore. In 1860, the 66th Gurkha Light Infantry was moved from Kangra to Dharamshala, which was at first made a subsidiary cantonment. The Battalion was later renamed 1st Gurkha Rifles. Dharamshala became a popular hill station in the British Raj era. The 1905 Kangra earthquake devastated the Kangra Valley, destroying the cantonment, much of the infrastructure of the region, and killing nearly 20,000 people: 1,625 at Dharmasala, including 15 foreigners and 112 of the Gurkha garrison. Many of the Gurkhas were part of the Indian National Army founded by Netaji Subhas Chandra Bose taking part in the Indian Independence movement.

=== Post independence ===
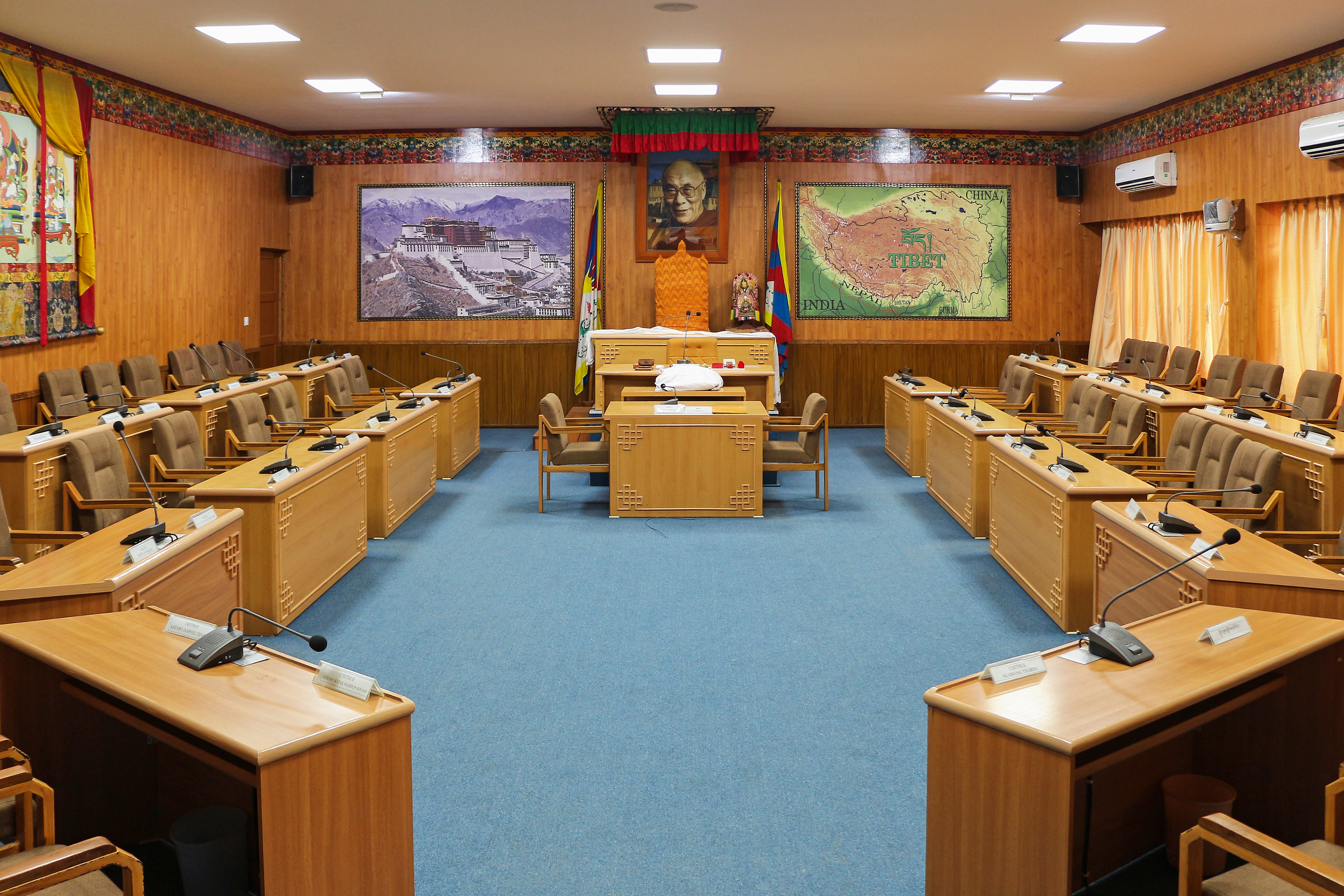
The Parliament of the Central Tibetan Administration in McLeodganj, Dharamshala, is the seat of the Tibetan government-in-exile

Post Indian Independence in 1947, it remained as a small hill station. On 29 April 1959, the 14th Dalai Lama Tenzin Gyatso established the Tibetan administration-in-exile in Mussoorie when he had to flee Tibet. In May 1960, the Central Tibetan Administration was moved to Dharamshala when Jawaharlal Nehru, then Prime Minister of India allowed him and his followers to settle in McLeod Ganj north of Dharamshala. There they established the "government-in-exile" in 1960 and the Namgyal Monastery. In 1970, the Dalai Lama opened the Library of Tibetan Works and Archives which is one of the most important institutions for Tibetology.

Several thousand Tibetan exiles have now settled in the area where monasteries, temples, and schools have come up. It has become an important tourist destination with many hotels and restaurants, leading to growth in tourism and commerce. In 2017, Dharamshala was made the winter capital of Himachal Pradesh with the legislative assembly located at Sidhbari.

== Geography ==
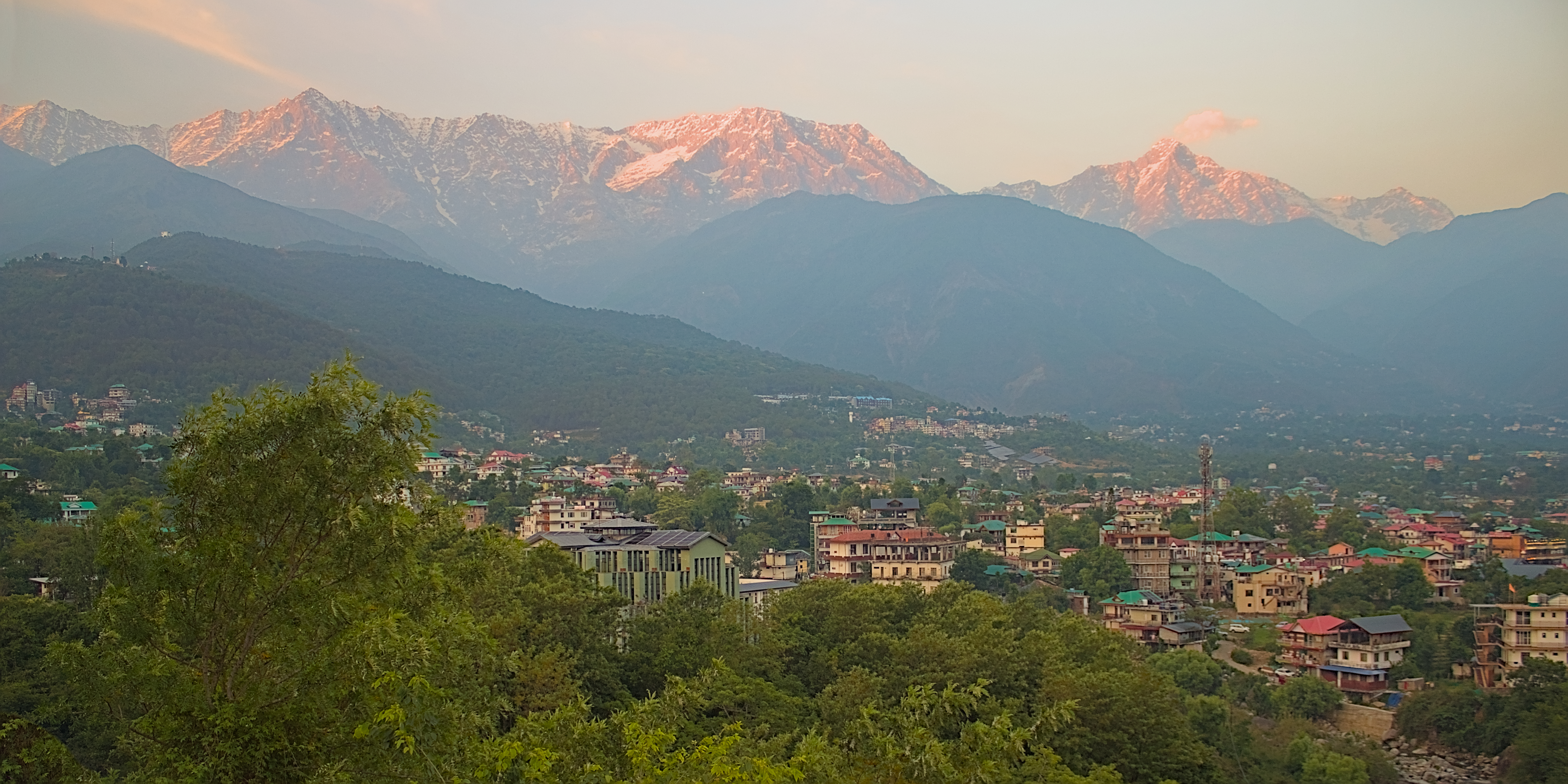
Snow-clad Dhauladhar range shining under evening alpenglow above Dharamshala

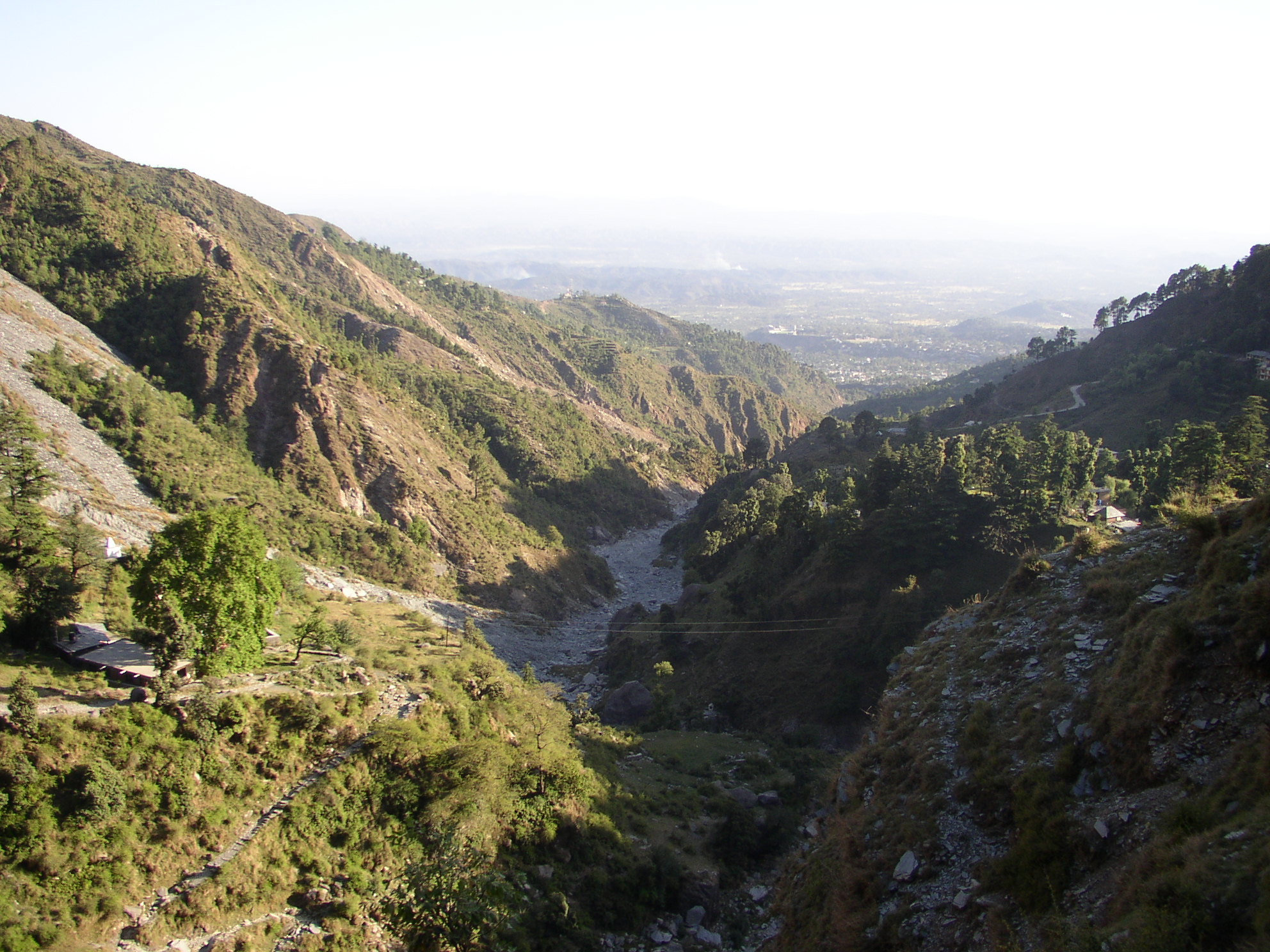
View of the Kangra Valley from Bhagsu Nag

Dharamshala has an average elevation of 1,457 m (4,780 ft), covering an area of almost 8.51 km^{2} (3.29 sq mi). Dharamsala is located in the Kangra Valley, in the shadow of the Dhauladhar mountains. The town is divided into two distinct sections "Lower Dharamshala" and McLeod Ganj with a narrow road surrounded by pine, Himalayan oak, and rhododendron connecting the regions.

== Climate ==
Dharamshala has a monsoon influenced, humid subtropical climate (Köppen: Cwa). Summer begins in early April and peaks in May when temperatures can reach 36 °C (97 °F) and lasts until the start of June. From June to mid-September is the monsoon season, when up to 3,000 mm (120 in) of rainfall can be experienced, making Dharamshala one of the wettest places in the state. Autumn is mild and lasts from October to the end of November.

Autumn temperatures average around 16–17 °C (61–63 °F). Winter starts in December and continues until late February. Snow and sleet are common during the winter in upper Dharamshala (including McLeodganj, Bhagsu Nag, and Naddi). Lower Dharamshala receives little frozen precipitation except for hail. Historically, the Dhauladhar mountains used to remain snow-covered all year long; however, in recent years they have been losing their snow blanket during dry spells.

Climate data for Dharamshala (1991–2020 normals, extremes 1951–present)
Month	Jan	Feb	Mar	Apr	May	Jun	Jul	Aug	Sep	Oct	Nov	Dec	Year
Record high °C (°F)	24.7 (76.5)	28.0 (82.4)	33.4 (92.1)	36.2 (97.2)	38.6 (101.5)	38.6 (101.5)	42.7 (108.9)	37.8 (100.0)	34.8 (94.6)	34.6 (94.3)	28.6 (83.5)	27.2 (81.0)	42.7 (108.9)
Mean daily maximum °C (°F)	16.0 (60.8)	17.8 (64.0)	22.5 (72.5)	26.9 (80.4)	30.8 (87.4)	30.9 (87.6)	27.5 (81.5)	26.6 (79.9)	26.8 (80.2)	25.6 (78.1)	22.0 (71.6)	18.4 (65.1)	24.4 (75.9)
Mean daily minimum °C (°F)	5.9 (42.6)	7.3 (45.1)	10.7 (51.3)	14.8 (58.6)	19.0 (66.2)	20.5 (68.9)	19.7 (67.5)	19.2 (66.6)	17.8 (64.0)	14.2 (57.6)	10.2 (50.4)	7.1 (44.8)	13.9 (57.0)
Record low °C (°F)	−1.9 (28.6)	−1.6 (29.1)	2.4 (36.3)	7.3 (45.1)	8.4 (47.1)	12.6 (54.7)	14.3 (57.7)	14.1 (57.4)	11.2 (52.2)	8.0 (46.4)	4.8 (40.6)	−1.0 (30.2)	−1.9 (28.6)
Average rainfall mm (inches)	83.6 (3.29)	128.3 (5.05)	111.3 (4.38)	65.7 (2.59)	72.4 (2.85)	279.0 (10.98)	859.0 (33.82)	942.3 (37.10)	377.7 (14.87)	52.6 (2.07)	18.8 (0.74)	36.6 (1.44)	3,027.3 (119.19)
Average rainy days	4.5	6.2	6.1	5.1	4.8	10.7	22.0	23.0	13.9	2.6	1.2	2.2	102.3
Average relative humidity (%) (at 17:30 IST)	67	67	58	55	50	59	81	85	78	65	64	66	66
Source: India Meteorological Department

== Demographics ==
Religions in Dharamsala
Religion	Percent
Hinduism	69.18%
Buddhism	27.70%
Sikhism	1.28%
Others	1.85%

As of the 2011 Census of India, Dharamshala had a population of 30,764. In 2015, the area under the administration of the municipal body was expanded with a revised population of 53,543 in 10,992 households. Males constituted 55% of the population and females 45%. Dharamshala has an average literacy rate of 87%, higher than the national average of 74.04%: male literacy is 90% and female literacy is 83%. 9% of the population is under 6 years of age with a sex ratio of 941. Hinduism is the most followed religion followed by Buddhism. Hindi is the official language while other languages spoken include Gaddi, Kangri, Punjabi, English, Lhasa Tibetan, Nepali and Pahari.

== Administration and politics ==
Dharamshala became a municipal corporation in 2015; before that it had been a municipal council. The corporation has 17 wards under its jurisdiction. The current mayor is Onkar Singh Nehria of the Bharatiya Janata Party (BJP), elected in 2022. The town is part of the Dharamshala Assembly constituency that elects its member to the Himachal Pradesh Legislative Assembly and Kangra Lok Sabha constituency that elects its member to the Lok Sabha, lower house of the Indian Parliament.

== Economy ==
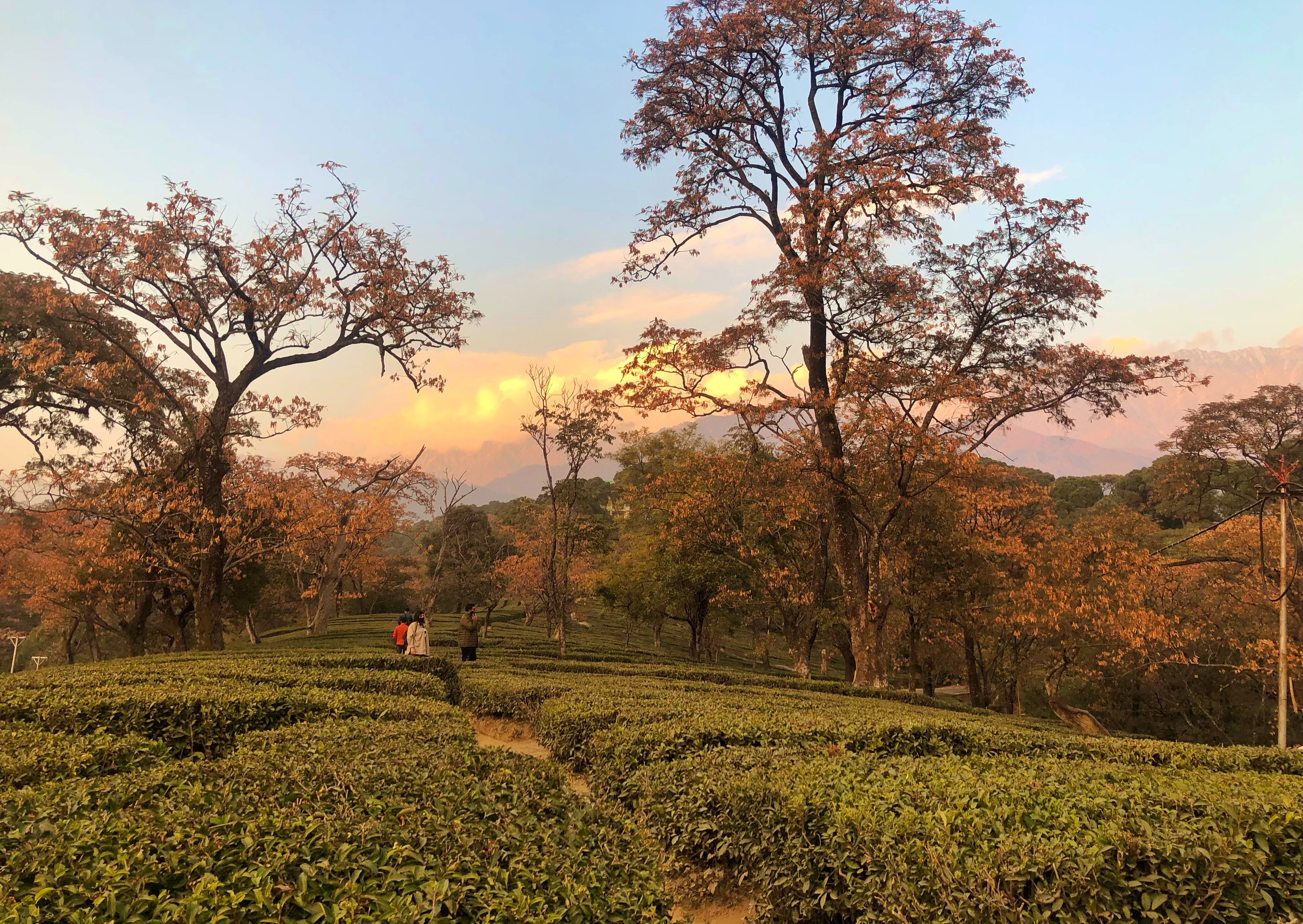
A Kangra tea plantation in Dharamsala

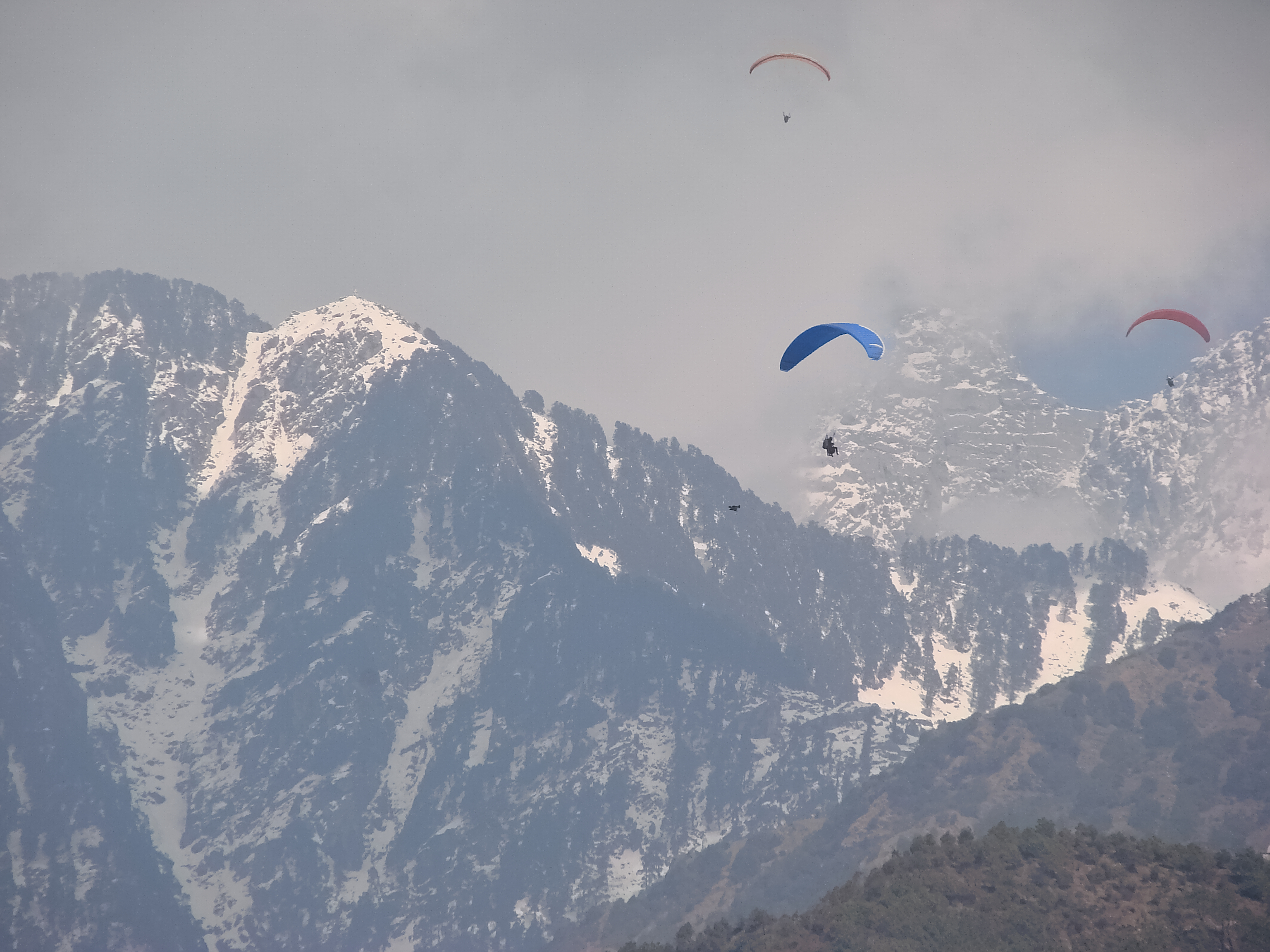
Paragliding in Dharamshala

The economy of the region is highly dependent on agriculture and tourism. The main crops grown in the valley are rice, wheat, and tea. Dharamshala has many tea plantations which produce the Kangra tea which has been granted geographical indication status.

Dharamshala is a major hill station and spiritual center. It hosts a number of trekking trails across the Himalayas into the upper Ravi Valley and Chamba district. Trekking trails include hikes to Indrahar Pass (4,342 meters or 14,245 ft) Toral Pass (4,575 m or 15,010 ft), Bhimghasutri Pass (4,580 m or 15,030 ft), Dharamshala—Bleni Pass (3,710 m or 12,170 ft), Kareri Lake, Himani Chamunda, Thatarna and Triund.

== Culture and attractions ==
Dharamshala is home to the Tibetan government-in-exile and houses numerous culturally significant sites:

- The Tibet Museum, located next to the Tsuglagkhang Complex in McLeod Ganj, displays rare photographs and archival materials chronicling Tibetan history, culture, and exile. It is managed by the Department of Information and International Relations of the Central Tibetan Administration.
- Himachal Pradesh Cricket Association Stadium is a cricket stadium situated at an altitude of 1317m, it is one of the highest altitude cricket stadiums. It has a capacity of 23,000 and serves as the home ground to the Himachal Pradesh cricket team and IPL team Kings XI Punjab.
- Naddi Viewpoint, located ~3 km from McLeod Ganj in Naddi village (2,000 m), offers panoramic views of the Dhauladhar range, especially at sunrise and sunset. It is popular for stargazing, short treks (e.g. to Triund), and a serene rural experience.
- St. John in the Wilderness Church, a Neo-Gothic Protestant church built in 1852 at Forsyth Gunj, is surrounded by deodar forest and features Belgian stained-glass windows. The bell tower was replaced in 1915 after the 1905 Kangra earthquake.
- Bhagsu Nath Temple, dedicated to Lord Shiva, lies ~2 km above McLeod Ganj near Bhagsunag. The ancient temple complex includes sacred pools fed by Tiger‑head fountains and is associated with the Bhagsu Nag legend.
- Hari Kothi, a heritage bungalow in Kotwali Bazaar, was built in the early 20th century and has hosted figures like Swami Vivekananda and Annie Besant. Today, it functions as a boutique homestay.
- The McLeod Ganj tea gardens and surrounding hillside plantations are part of the Kangra Valley tea region, known for producing pale, sweet brew that has gained attention for its unique flavour in recent years.
- Norbulingka Institute, established in 1995 in Sidhpur near Dharamshala, preserves Tibetan arts and culture. It features workshops in thangka painting, woodcarving, and hosts the Seat of Happiness Temple.
- Peepal Farm, located near Dhanotu village (~30 km from Dharamshala), is an animal rescue centre and organic farm that also promotes sustainable living. It offers volunteering opportunities in animal welfare and natural farming.
- Kotwali Bazaar, Traditional shopping streets are located here. Malls and multiplex cinemas are found on the National Highway Road in the Chilgari area, near Kotwali Bazaar and the main bus stand. DIFF was established in 2012 to promote contemporary art, cinema and independent media practices in the Himalayan region.

== Transport ==
Dharamshala is well connected by road to major cities in North India. The Himachal Road Transport Corporation (HRTC) operates regular bus services, including luxury and superfast coaches to Shimla, Delhi, Chandigarh, Pathankot, Amritsar and Manali. Private operators and local taxis also provide service to nearby destinations within Kangra district and the wider Himachal Pradesh region.

A ropeway system called the Dharamshala Skyway, inaugurated in January 2022, connects Dharamshala with McLeod Ganj, significantly reducing travel time and easing traffic congestion on steep, narrow roads.

In 2015 Dharamshala was included in the Smart Cities Mission and hence will soon have smart solutions implemented for infrastructure and clean environment.

=== Road ===
National Highway NH 503 starts from Dharmashala and connects the town to Hoshiarpur in Punjab via Kangra. State highways link the town with NH 154 running from Pathankot to Mandi, Himachal Pradesh. Dharamshala is well connected by road, with luxury buses regularly operating from major cities like Delhi and Shimla. The Himachal Pradesh Road Transport Corporation (HRTC) runs a daily luxury coach service between Delhi and Dharamshala. In addition, both public and private buses are available from the main Dharamshala Bus Stand, providing connectivity to various towns and cities across Himachal Pradesh and beyond.

=== Air ===
The nearest airport is Kangra Airport (also known as Gaggal Airport, IATA: DHM), located about 15 km southwest of Dharamshala. It offers direct flights to Delhi and Chandigarh, and seasonal services to other northern cities. The airport handled over 200,000 passengers in the 2023–24 financial year, according to the Airports Authority of India.

The nearest major international airport is Chandigarh International Airport, approximately 250 km away by road.

=== Rail ===
While Dharamshala does not have a direct railway station, the nearest major railhead is Pathankot Junction, about 85 km away. The Kangra Valley Railway, a narrow-gauge line built during the colonial era, connects Pathankot with Joginder Nagar. The closest station on this line to Dharamshala is Chamunda Marg, located approximately 21 km from the town. From Pathankot, taxis and buses are available for onward travel.

=== Ropeway ===
A 1.8 km (1.1 mi) long ropeway called Dharamshala Skyway connecting Dharamshala and Mcleodganj via cable car was inaugurated in January 2022.

== Education ==
- Central University of Himachal Pradesh
- Government College of Teacher Education Dharamsala

== Notable people ==
- James Bruce, 8th Earl of Elgin
- Chandrarekha Dhadwal (born 1951), writer, poet, novelist and retired lecturer
- Tenzin Gyatso, 14th Dalai Lama
- Alfred W. Hallett, artist
- Kishan Kapoor, Member of Parliament
- Chandresh Kumari Katoch, former minister of cultural and external affairs government of India.
- Mehr Chand Mahajan (1889–1967), former Chief Justice of India
- Sudhir Sharma, politician.
- Sher Jung Thapa Indian Army
