= Dharamkot, Himachal Pradesh =

Dharamkot
- Village
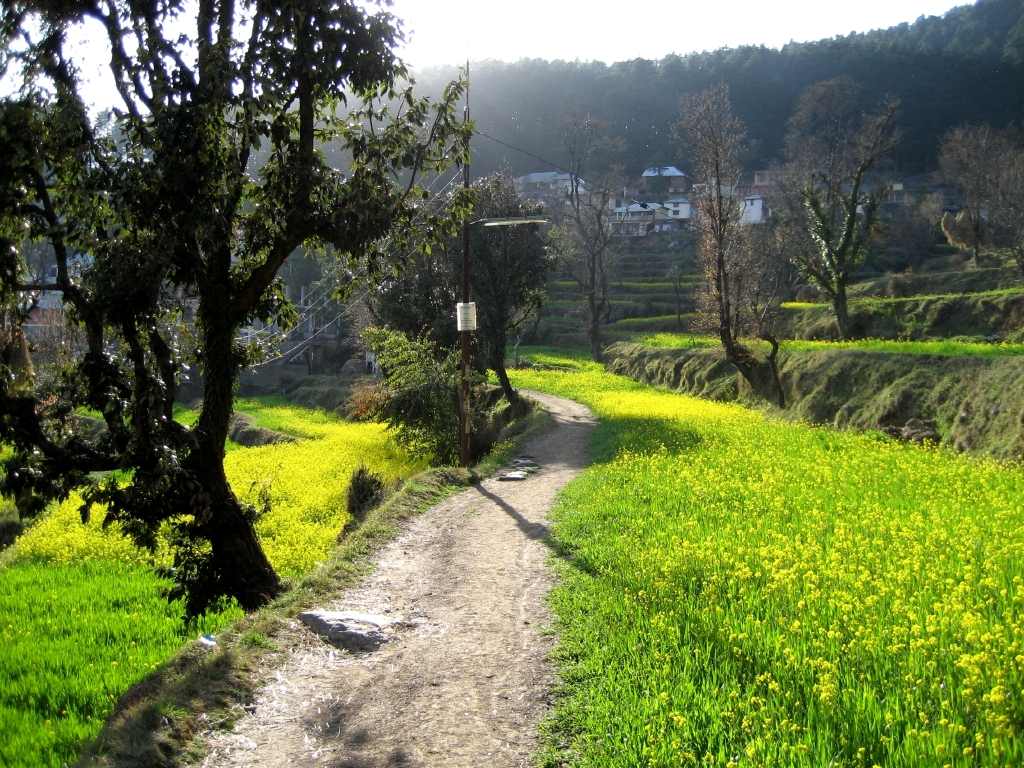
- A mustard field at Dharamkot near Dharamshala

- Location in Himachal Pradesh, India
- Coordinates: 32.238602°N 76.323878°E
- Country: India
- State: Himachal Pradesh
- District: Kangra
- Elevation: 2,100 m (6,900 ft)

Languages
  - Official: Hindi
  - Native: Pahari
- Time zone: UTC+5:30 (IST)

Dharamkot (aka Dharmkot) is a small hill station in Kangra district in the state of Himachal Pradesh, India.

On the crest of a hill above McLeodGanj, Dharamkot is a spot with wide views of the Kangra Valley and the Dhauladhar ranges. Dharamkot also has the Vipassana meditation center, Dhamma Shikara, as well as the Tushita Meditation Centre which is a center for the study and practice of Buddhism in the Tibetan Mahayana tradition. Past Dharamkot, at a distance of 9 km from McLeodGanj, much of which is a steady climb, Triund is at the foot of the Dhauladhar ranges and is at a height of 2,827 m. The snow line is the most easily accessible in the entire Himalayan range starts from Ilaqua, 4 km from Triund.

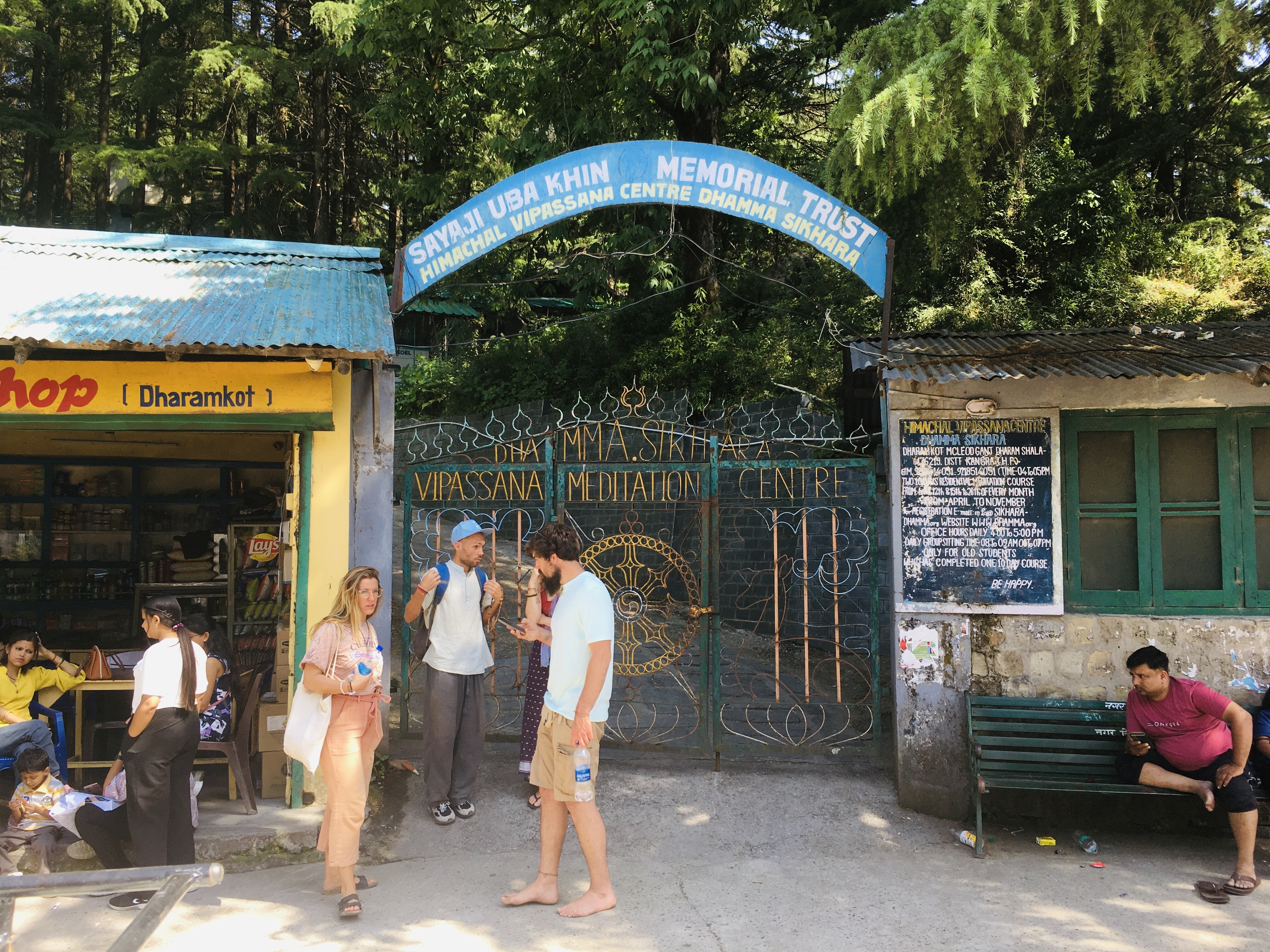
Vipassana meditation centre, Dhamma Shikara

== Israeli tourism ==
Dharamkot has a Jewish community center – the Chabad house, which stands in the middle of the village and looks like 770 Eastern Parkway. Restaurants serve Levantine dishes : falafel, shakshuka and hummus with pita. Over time, locals have also acclimatised and many can now fluently speak Hebrew. Signage and boards in the village are also written in Hebrew, and keyboards in Internet cafes have Hebrew letters. Israeli people every year mark ceremonies here to celebrate Rosh-Hashana.

== Old structures ==
There was a old stone structure built around 150 years ago by American Pentecostal Mission and the building was destroyed in 1985 earthquake. This village is identified as one of the best scenic villages of Himalayas.

== Triund ==
The trek to Triund starts from Gallu Devi temple in Dharamkot, where people going for this trek register their names.

The trek mostly is a straight route up to Triund. The distance is 11 kilometers and usually takes about 4–5 hours.

== Gallery ==
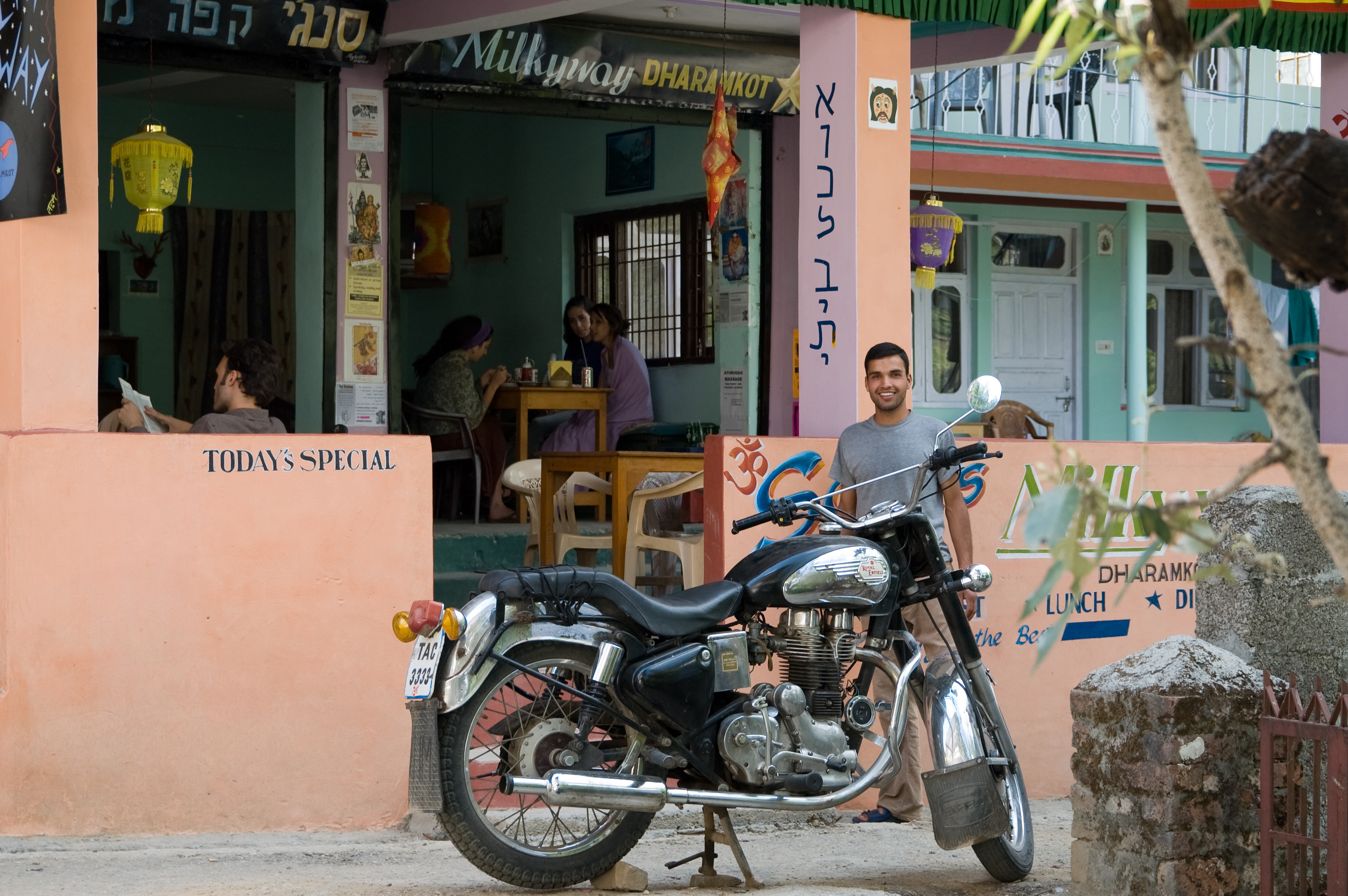
Hebrew writing in Dharamkot : סנג'י קפה מסעדה אוכל ביתי

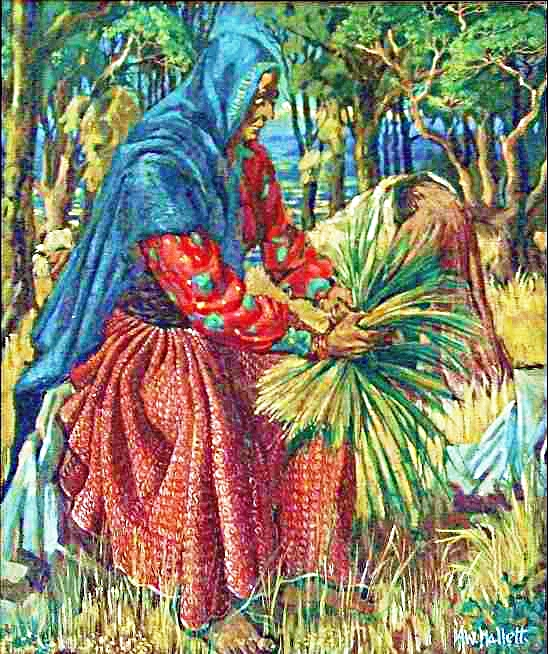
Gaddi woman cutting grass, Dharamkot. By Alfred Hallett c. 1980.

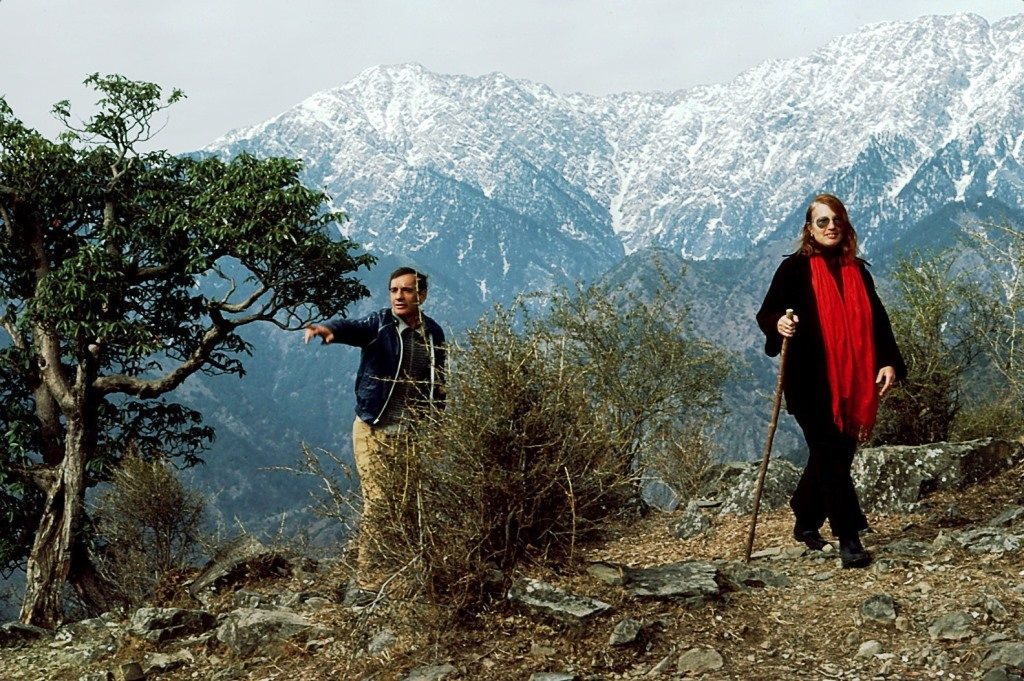
View from Dharamkot looking west. 1980

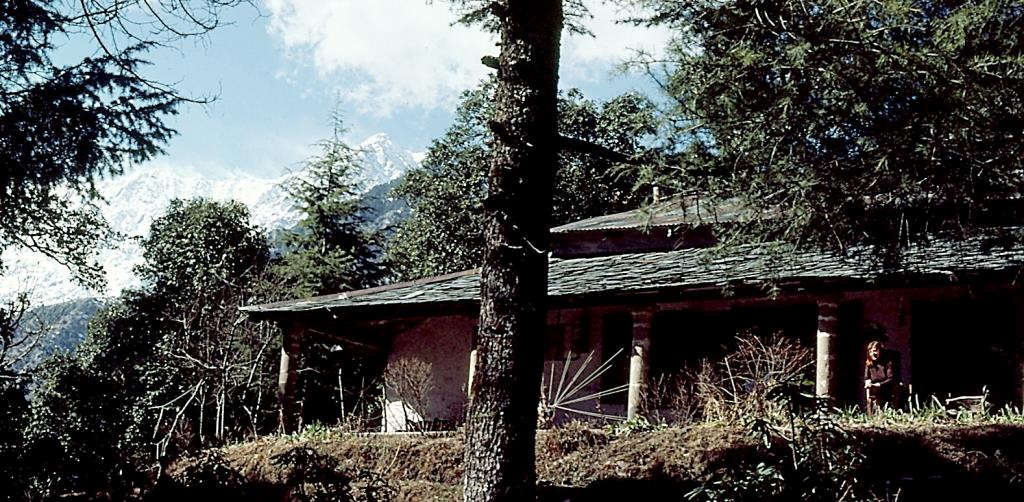
Carlton Cottage. Dharamkot. 1980

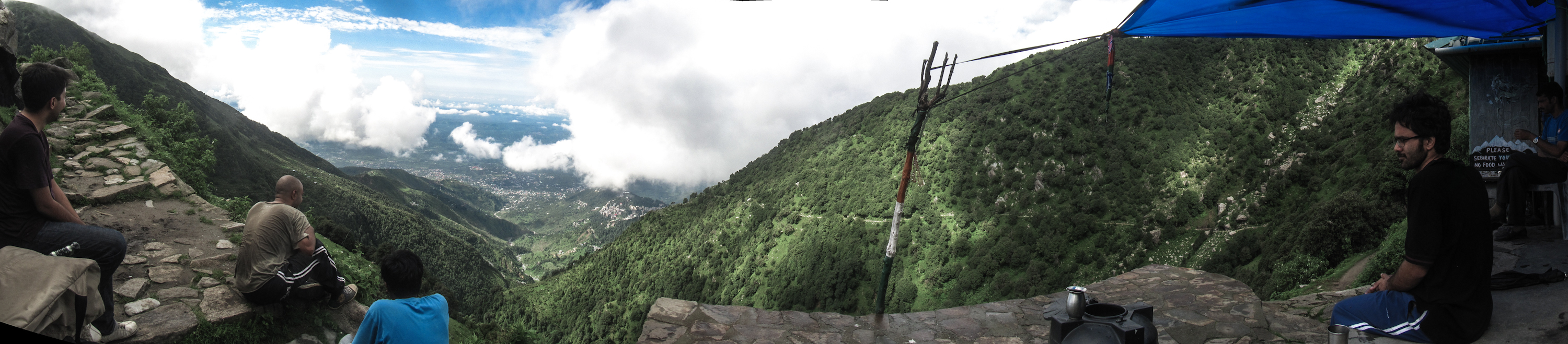
View from Magic Cafe; one of the 4 cafes on the way to Triund.

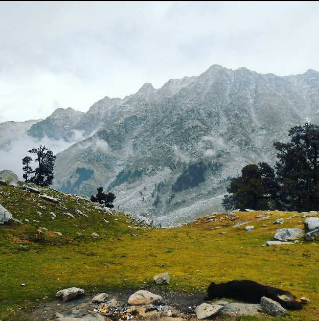
View from just outside Snowline Cafe. November 2015
