= Kotwali Bazar =

- Suburb
- Location in Himachal Pradesh Kotwali Bazar (India)
- Coordinates: 32.222°N 76.317°E
- Country: India
- State: Himachal Pradesh
- District: Kangra
- City: Dharamshala
- Established: 21.10.1911
- Elevation: 1,457 m (4,780 ft)

Languages
  - Official: Hindi
- Time zone: UTC+5:30 (IST)
- PIN: 176 215
- Telephone code: 91-1892
- Vehicle registration: HP 39, HP 68
- Website: j

Kotwali Bazar is a suburb of Dharamshala, situated at the foothills of Dhauladhar mountains, a southern branch of the main Outer Himalayan chain of mountains, in Kangra district in the Indian state of Himachal Pradesh.

There are sight seeing options like Kangra Art Museum, War Memorial and the famous Kunal Pathri temple in Kotwali Bazar.
