= Banjar, India =

Banjar
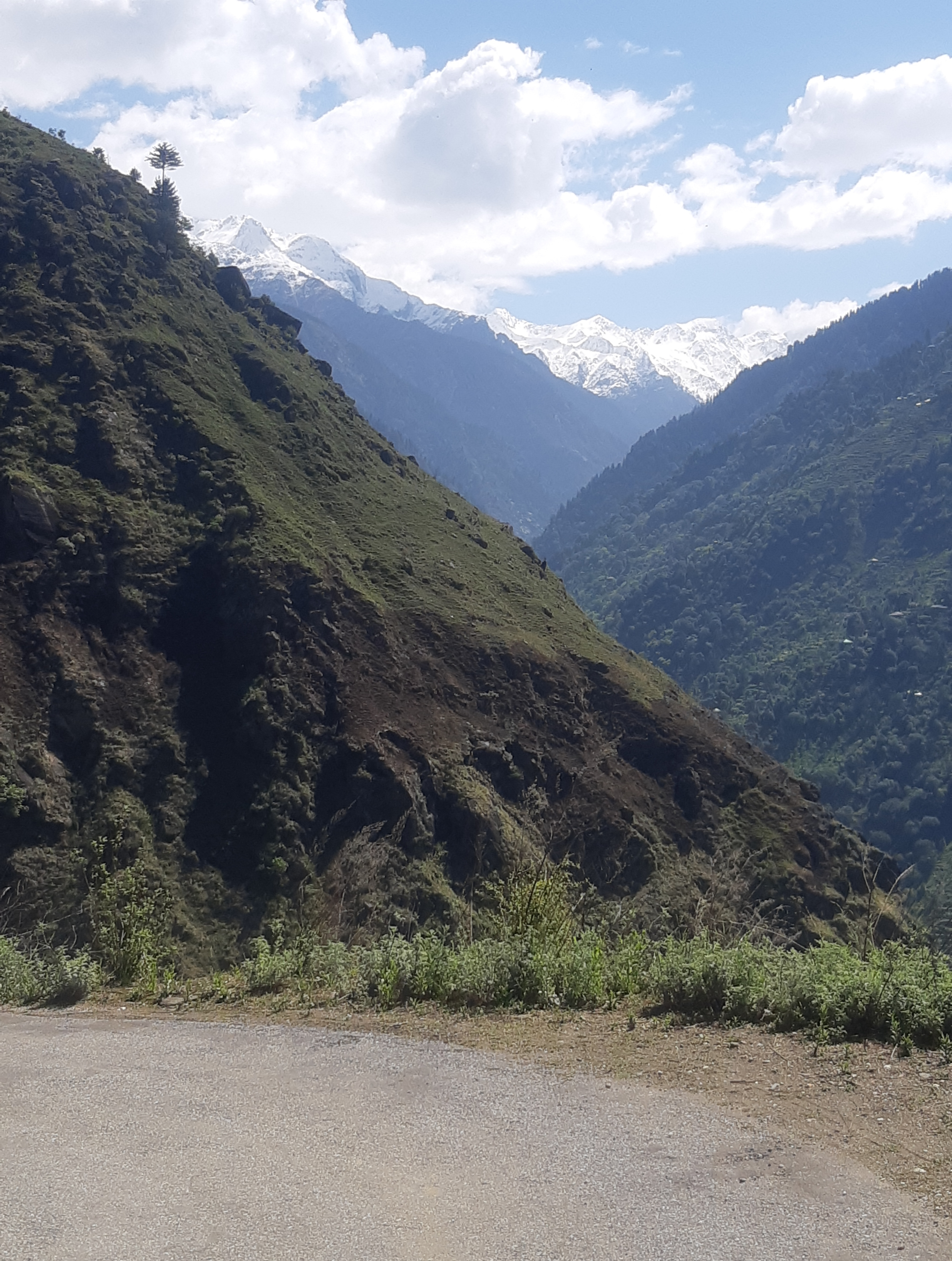
- Views of snow covered mountains from Banjar

- Location in Himachal Pradesh, India Banjar (India)
- Coordinates: 31°38′15″N 77°20′40″E
- Country: India
- State: Himachal Pradesh
- District: Kullu

Government
  - MLA: Surender Shourie
- Elevation: 1,435 m (4,708 ft)

Population (2011)
  - Total: 1,414

Languages
  - Official: Hindi
  - Regional: Kullui (Inner Saraji)
- Time zone: UTC+5:30 (IST)
- PIN: 175123
- Area code: 01903
- Vehicle registration: HP-49

Banjar (pronounced: banjāra) is a town in Kullu district in the state of Himachal Pradesh, India. Banjar is one of the five sub-divisions of Kullu district. Banjar town serves as the headquarters of Banjar sub-division and tehsil. Culturally, it is a part of the Seraj region that extends from Jalori pass to Shikari Devi in Janjehli. A dialect of Kulluvi called Seraji is spoken in the region and the natives are also called Serajis. The tourist attractions of Tirthan valley and Jibhi are a part of the Banjar region with Banjar town being the main marketplace in Tirthan Valley.

The 45 village clusters in the tehsil rely on the town of Banjar for their major needs. The town has a Government Senior Secondary School, Government Degree College, Civil Hospital, Bus Station, Police Station and a Sub Divisional Magistrate's office.

Farming and horticulture are a major source of the local economy along with government jobs and recently booming tourism industry. Major horticulture produce in the lower reaches is centred around pomegranates, plums, pears, apricots, persimmons, walnuts while apples has been the major crop in the upper reaches. Trout fish farming has also become a part of the local economy in the region.

== Legend and history ==
Banjar is also associated with the birth of the Hindu deity Rama. According to a legend of Ramayana, it was Rishi Shringi from the Banjar valley, who had an ashram at Chehni. He was the Purohit (sage) at the ‘Putreshtiyajna’ performed by Dasharatha during the age of Satya Yuga for a son to be born. As a result of the actions and prayers by Rishi Shringi, Rama was born.

Banjar region is home to the ancient Shalri rock inscription, dated to the 4th century AD. Originally it was discovered in 1904-05 and believed to have been lost to a flood in the Tirthan River somewhere in Banjar valley, it was rediscovered in November 2014. The three-line Brahmi inscription records Maharaja Chandesvarahastin and his father, Isvarahastin, of the Vatsa gotra. It describes Chandesvarahastin's victory over a ruler named Rajila where both were presumably trying to control the Banjar valley. The boulder also features a carving of a trident and axe, indicating the early rulers' Shaivite affiliation.

== Geography ==
Banjar is located at 31.63°N 77.35°E. It is situated at an average height of 1,435 metres (4,708 ft) from sea level. The place lies on the alternate route to Kullu from Shimla. The main route is via Bilaspur and Mandi. The alternate route goes from Theog, Aani, Jalori Pass, Banjar and joins the main route at Aut.

Temperatures can go a few degrees below 0 °C in the winter months of December–January and climb up to 30° in the peak summer months of June–July. The months of March, April, May, June, September, October, November are considered the best for hiking and exploring the region. The higher reaches of the valley receive heavy snowfall, however the town of Banjar along with other villages by the river Tirthan receive little snowfall once or twice each winter

The tree cover varies from pine forest in the lower reaches of the valley by Tirthan river, Deodar/Cedar forest in the middle region, Fir/Spruce/Oak/Horse Chestnut/Rhododendron in the upper parts followed by the lush meadows above the tree line.

The Banjar Valley is in the middle Himalayan range and going towards the east, the peaks progressively get taller, finally giving way to the Great Himalayan range, where peaks have heights of 4500 meters and above. Banjar is one of the tehsil of the Kullu district. C-24 is the name given to Banjar Constituency. Banjar constituency has three Zila Parishad ward names as Khadagad, Plahach, and Raila. The city is growing with rapid speed in the tourism industry. The valley is also a gateway to The Great Himalayan National Park from its north-eastern side. The town consists of a lot of pocket-friendly and less crowded tourist places and serves as a summer destination. The main source of earning in this area is through agriculture and horticulture. Now tourism and hospitality industry is attracting the locals.

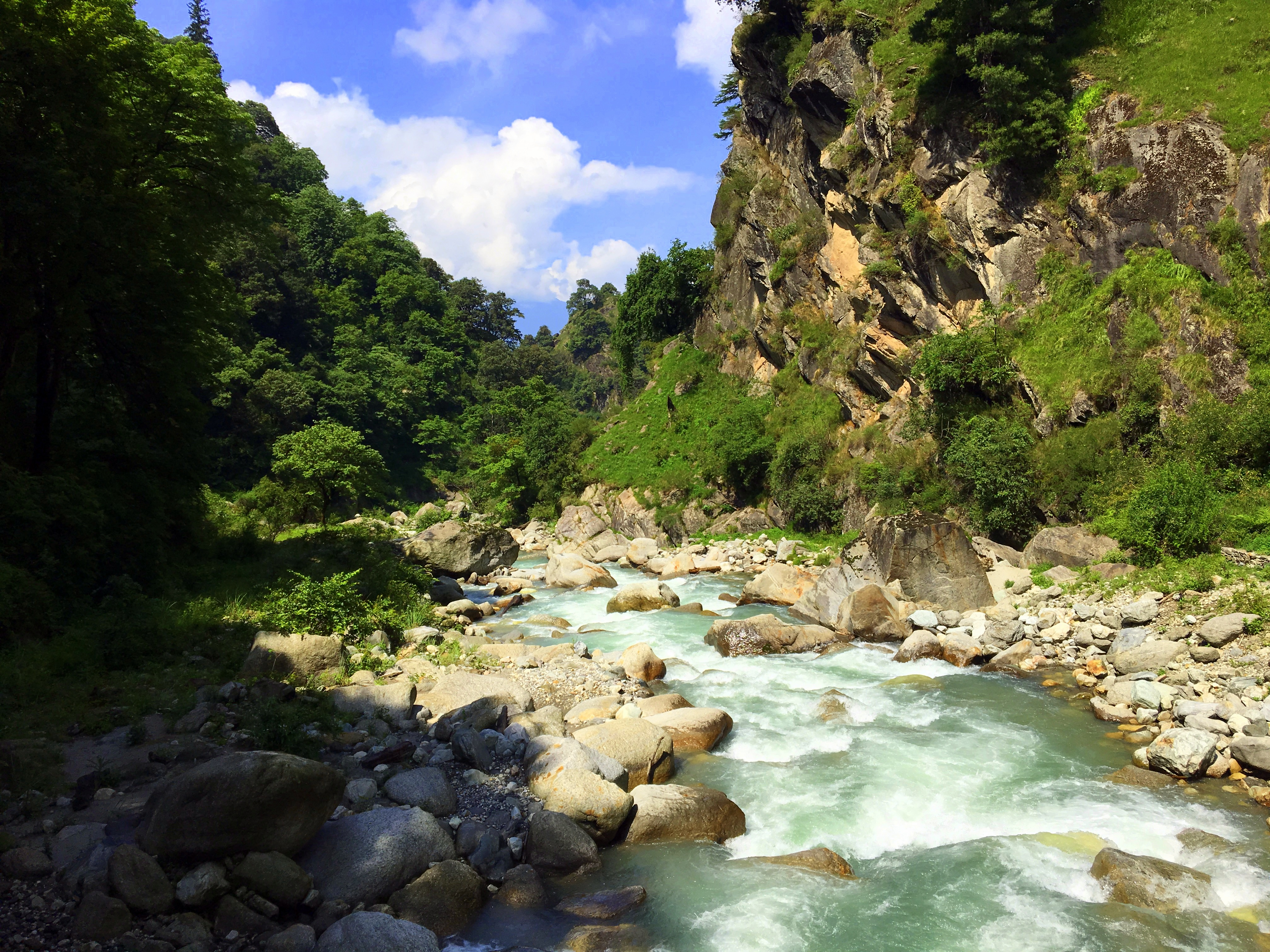
Tirthan River

River Tirthan flows through Banjar along with the tributary Pushpabhadra flowing through the tourist town of Jibhi. The town of Banjar is located at the confluence of these two rivers. Tirthan River is protected by the Himachal Legislature as a free-flowing river.

'Banjar mela ' is the prominent festival of the region which is celebrated each year in the month of May.

Tirthan and Jibhi valley are the two main attractions in Banjar. Tirthan valley is also known for the Trout fish Valley and its divine beauty. People of Banjar celebrate many festivals like Magh-Sakranti (in January), Faguli (in March), Shairi (in September), and Diwali. People wear woolen clothes. There are many holy places.

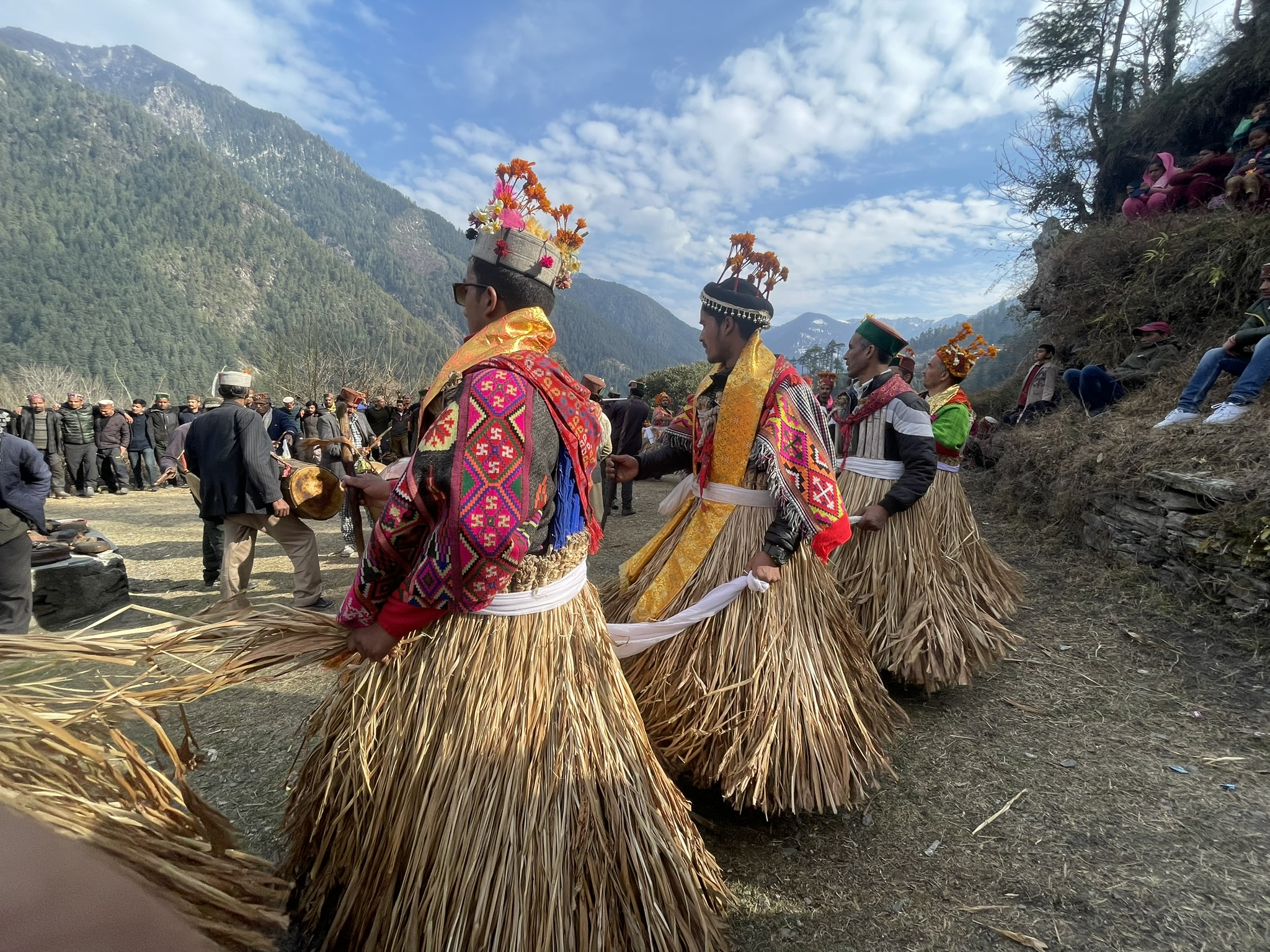
Villagers dancing during Faguli Festival in Banjar

== Demographics ==
As of 2001 India census, Banjar had a population of 1262. Males constitute 55% of the population and females 45%. Banjar has an average literacy rate of 84%, higher than the national average of 59.5%; with 89% of the males and 78% of females literate. 8% of the population is under 6 years of age, of which 52% are male and 48% are female.

Administrative Setup of Banjar Sub Division

1	Year of creation of Sub Division	1963
2	Total Area (Hectares)	122900
3	Total Assembly Constituency	24-Banjar
4	Administrative Units	
4.1	Tehsils	1 Banjar
4.2	Sub-Tehsils	1 Sainj
4.3	Blocks	1
4.4	Towns	1
4.5	Total Villages	45
4.6	Total Police Stations/Posts	2
5	Families	
5.1	Total Families	10,940
5.2	Rural Families	10,597
5.3	Urban Families	343
6	Literacy	
6.1	Total	70.88
6.2	Male	83.28
6.3	Female	57.99
7	Panchyati Raj	
7.1	Total Panchayats	41
7.2	Backward Panchayats	7
7.3	Zila Parishad Members	2
7.4	Panchayat Samiti Members	15
7.5	Gram Panchayat Members	198
7.6	Total Panchayat Secretaries	12
7.7	Total Panchayat Sahyaks	22
7.8	Total Technical Assistants	10
8	Agriculture	
8.1	Total Agricultural Land (Hect.)	10,858
8.2	Net Shown Area (Hect.)	6,935
8.3	Anganwaris	45
8.4	Primary Schools	153
8.5	Middle Schools	20
8.6	High Schools	14
8.7	Senior Secondary Schools	3
8.8	Colleges	1
9	Health	
9.1	P.H.C.	3
9.2	Sub-Centres	18
9.3	Hospitals	1
9.4	Ayurvadic Health Centres	12
10	Banks	
10.1	Co-operative Banks	3
10.2	Commercial Banks	4
10.3	Land Dev. Banks	1
11	No. of Micro Watershed Schemes	6
11.1	Area Covered (Hect.)	3,701

== Attractions ==
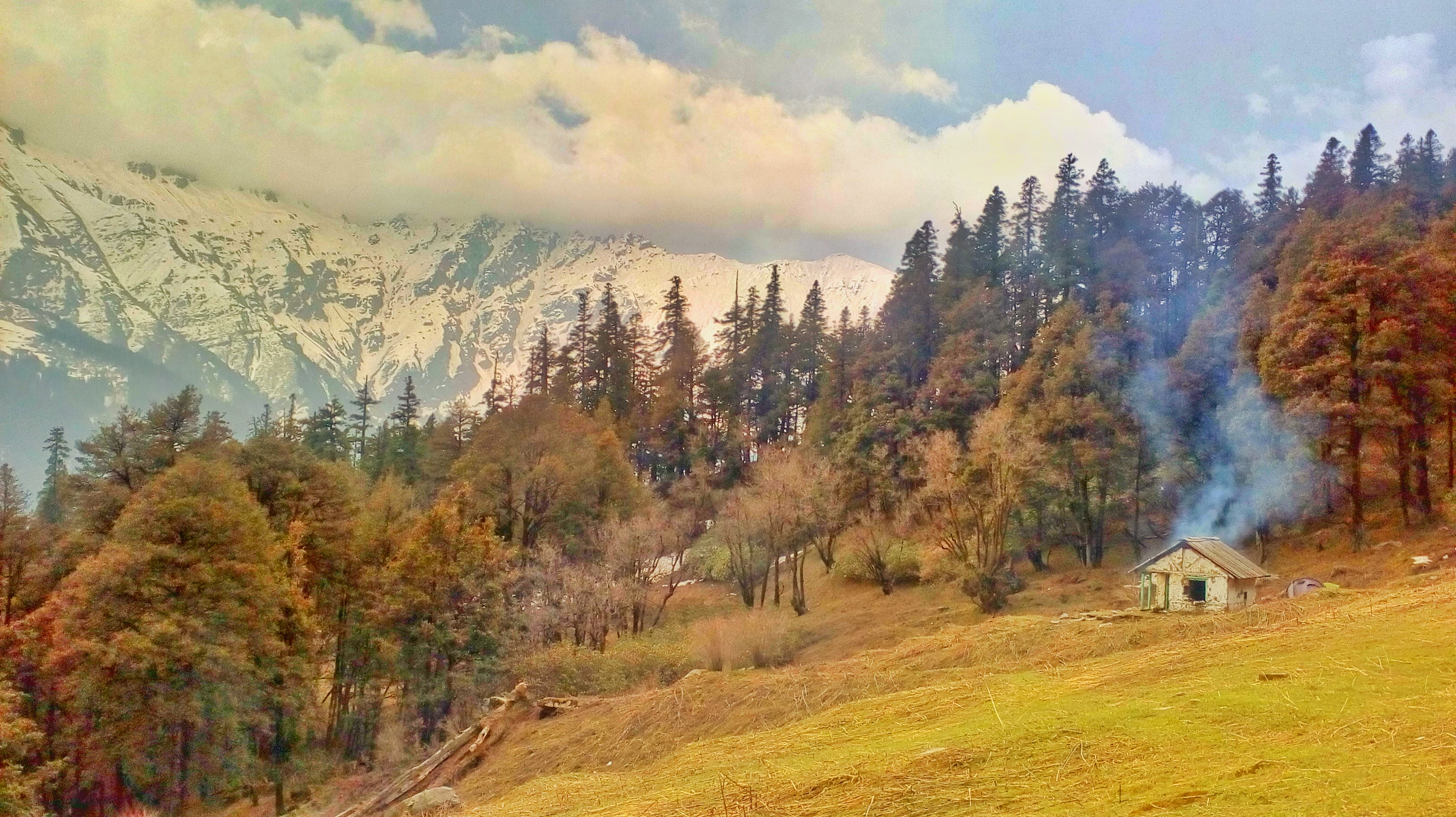
Nada Thach, Tirthan Valley

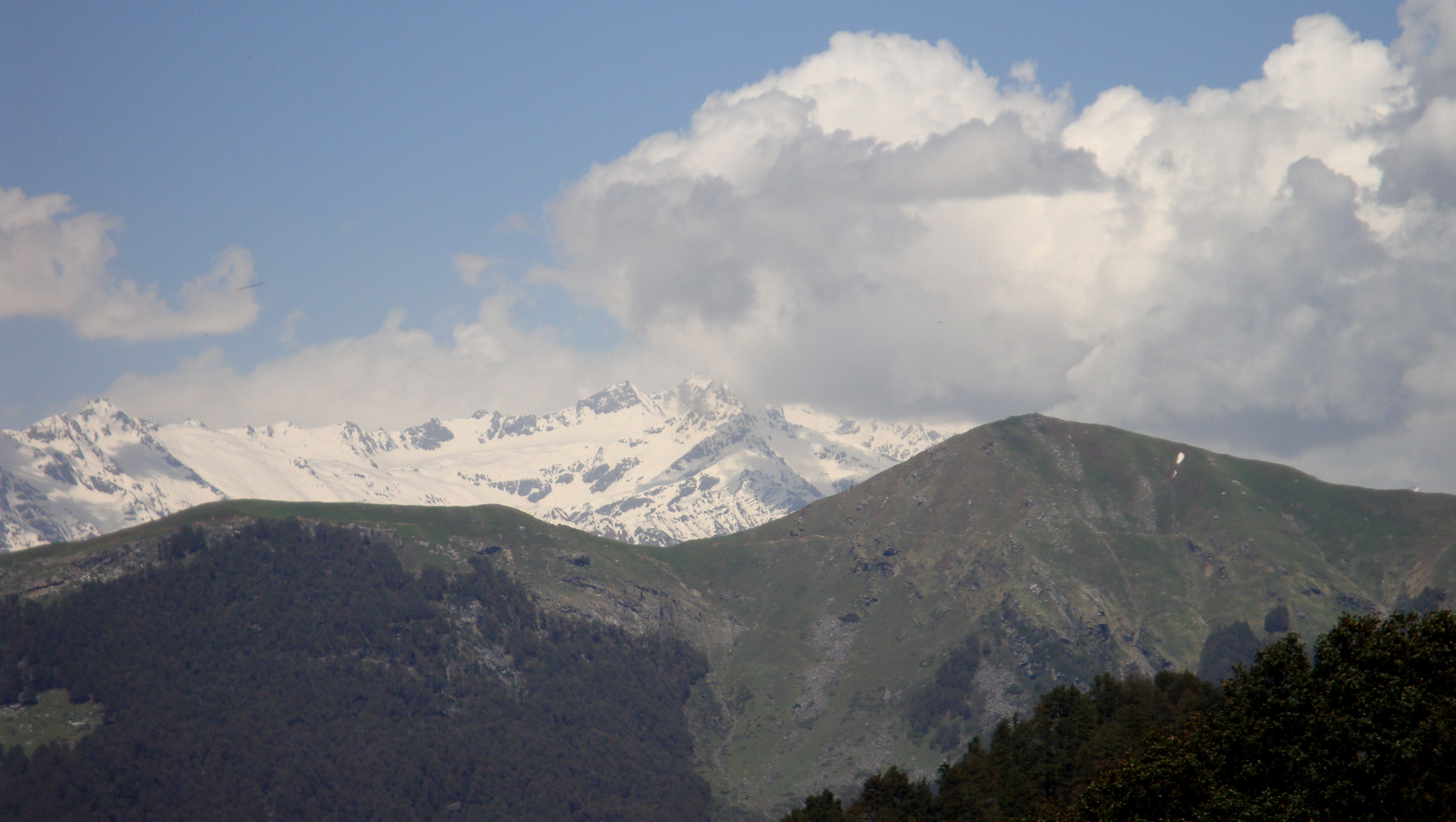
Jalori Pass

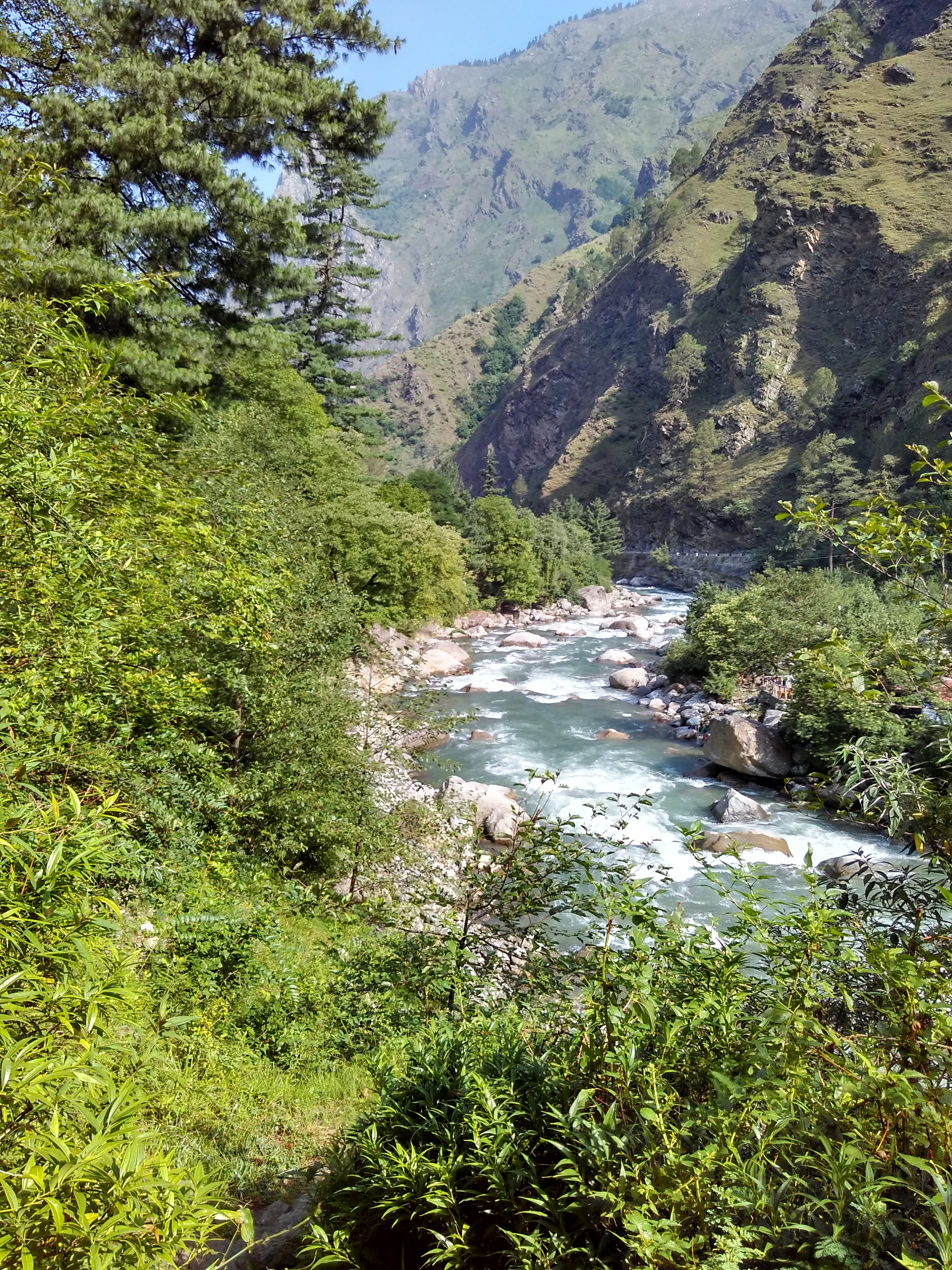
Gushaini, Tirthan Valley

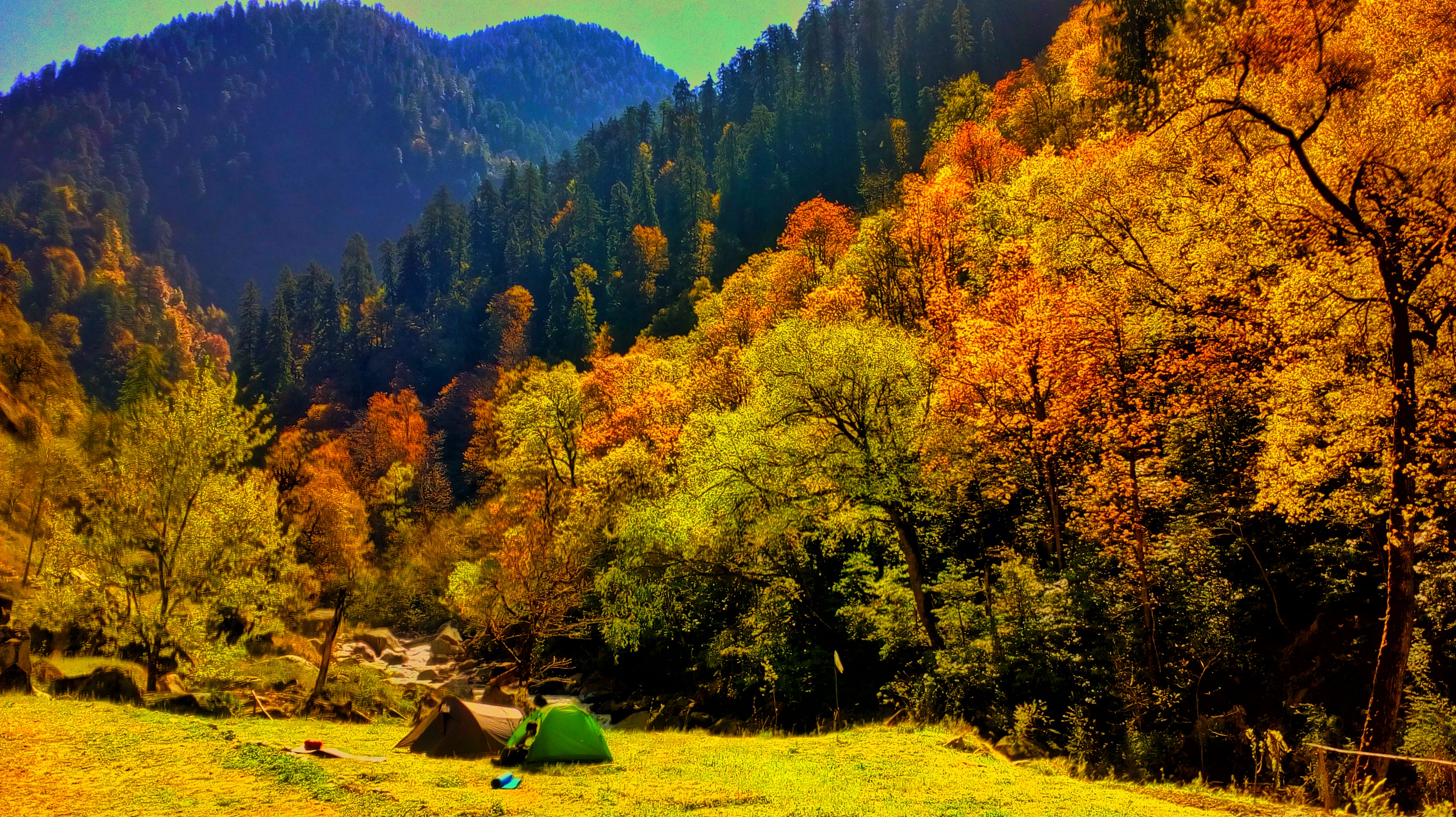
Rolla, Tirthan Valley

Chehni Kothi

There are many tourist attractions in Banjar, these are the waterfalls of Tirthan valley, Shairopa forest complex, Chehni fort of deity Shringa Rishi, Balo temple of deity Balo Nag, Jibhi town, Shoja, Jalori Pass, Bashleo Pass, Raghupur Fort,Tirthan WLS and the Great Himalayan National Park etc.

== Transportation ==
Though Bhuntar is the closest airport, flights tend to be erratic due to the weather. There is availability of Himachal Tourism (HTPDC) bus to Manali. The state-run bus service is reliable and comfortable compared to private operators, and quite safe for travellers.

An alternate route is via Shimla, where one can travel through the Jalori pass, seeing villages like Shoja and cedar forests along the way to the valley. It's also possible to take a train (or flight) to Chandigarh and take a taxi to the valleys. Another alternative is taking the toy train from Kalka to Shimla and driving down from there.
