= Kullu district =

District of Himachal Pradesh, India

- District of Himachal Pradesh
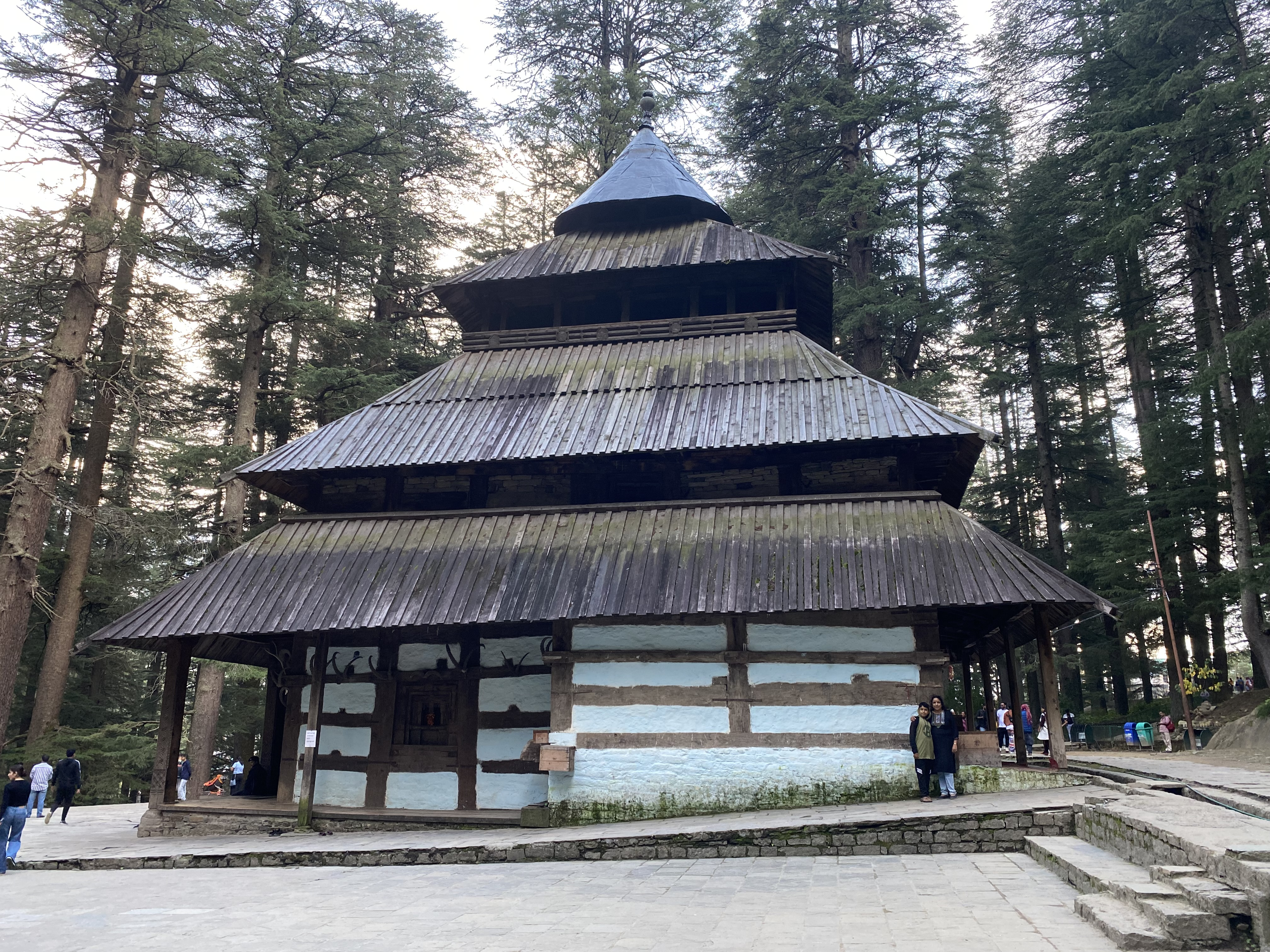
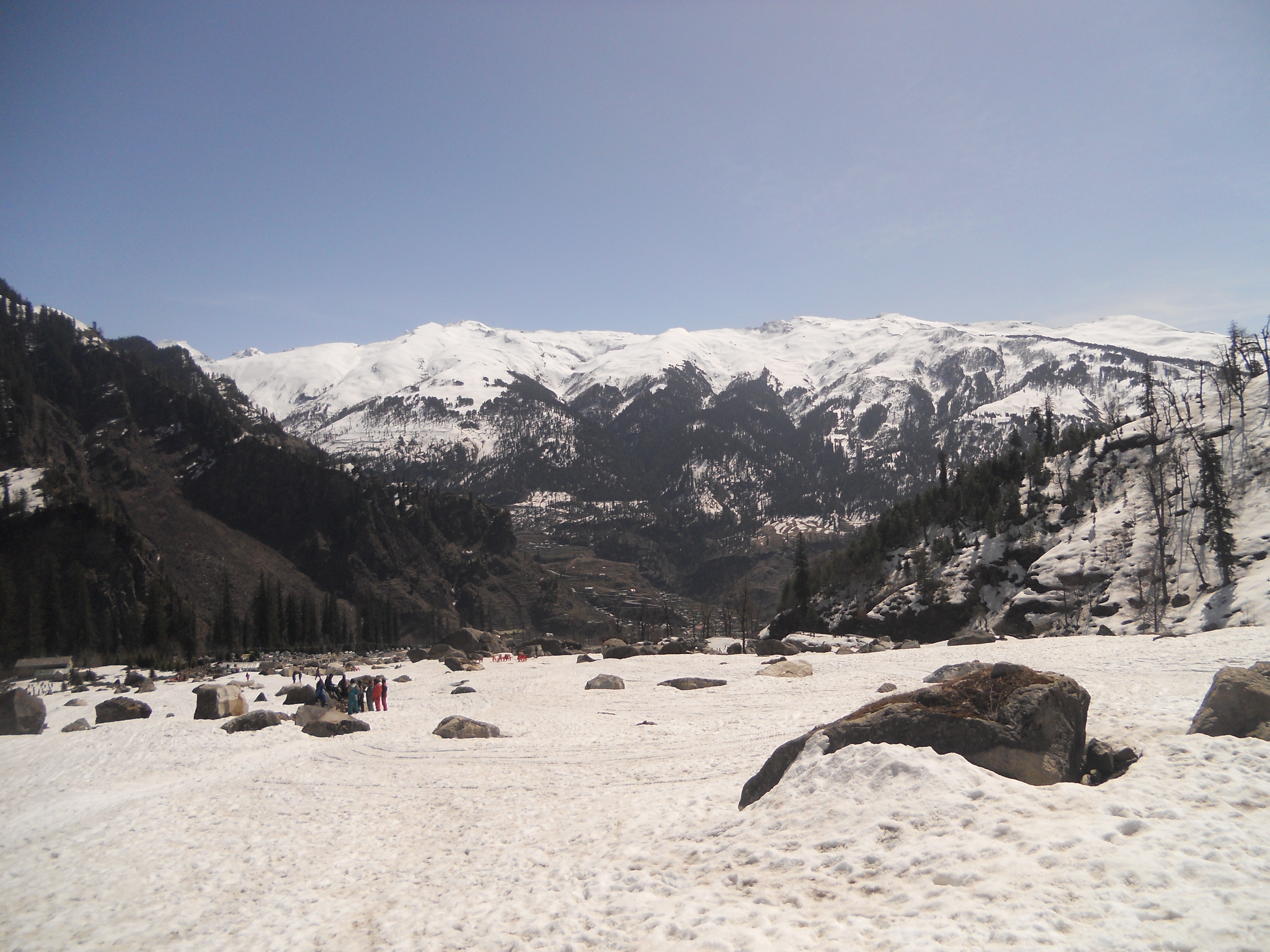
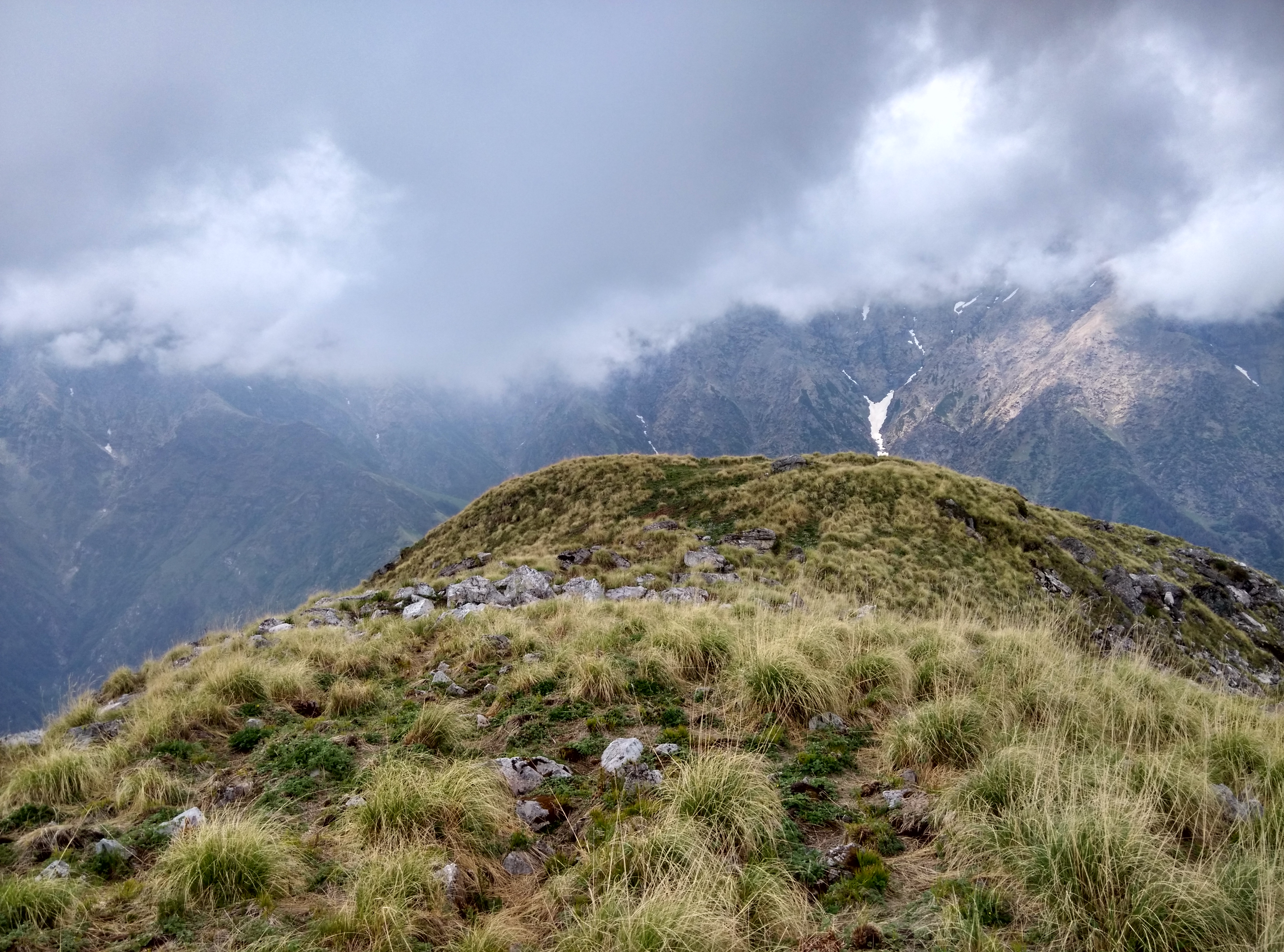
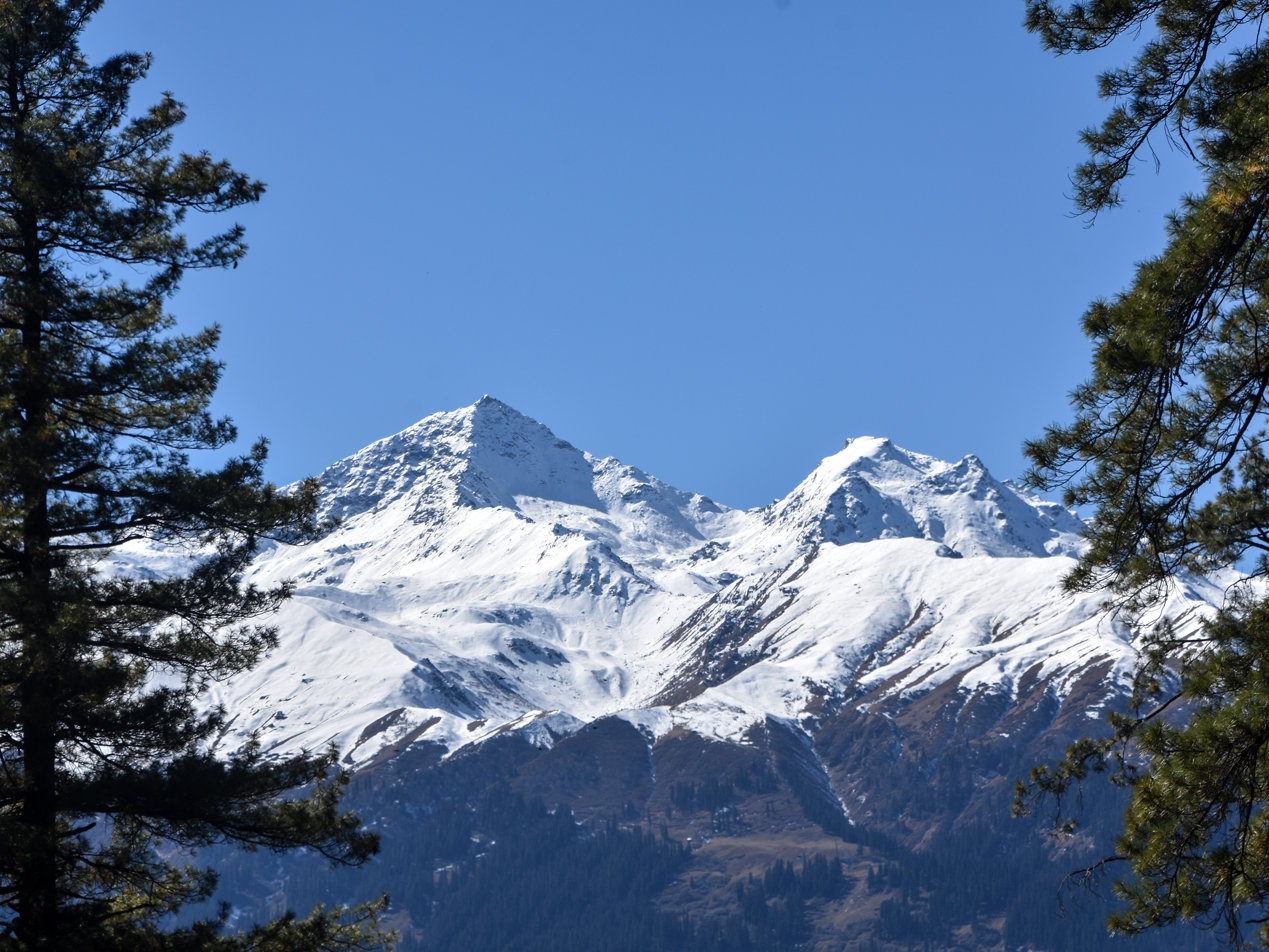
- Clockwise from top-left: Hidimba Devi Temple, View from Solang Valley, mountains in the Parvati Valley, mountains near Manali, Rakhundi Top in Great Himalayan National Park
- Interactive map of Kullu district
- Coordinates (Kullu): 31.99°N 77.40°E
- Country: India
- State: Himachal Pradesh
- Headquarters: Kullu
- Sub-divisions: Kullu, Banjar, Manali, Anni and Nirmand

Government
  - Constituencies: Kullu, Banjar, Manali and Anni

Area
  - Total: 5,503 km^{2} (2,125 sq mi)

Population (2011)
  - Total: 437,903
  - Density: 79.58/km^{2} (206.1/sq mi)
  - Urban: 7.92%

Demographics
  - Literacy: 63.45%
  - Sex ratio: 105%

Languages
  - Official: Hindi
  - Regional: Kullui
- Time zone: UTC+05:30 (IST)
- Website: http://hpkullu.nic.in/

Kullu district (Hindi: kullū, pronounced [kʊlːuː]) is a district in Himachal Pradesh, India. It borders Shimla district to the south, Mandi and Kangra districts to the west, Kinnaur to the east and the Lahaul and Spiti district to the north and east. The largest valley in this mountainous district is the Kullu Valley, which follows the course of the Beas River, and ranges in elevation from 833 metres (2,733 ft) at Aut to 3,330 metres (10,930 ft) at the Atal Tunnel South Portal, below Rohtang Pass. The town of Kullu, located on the right side of the Beas River, serves as the administrative headquarters of the Kullu district. The Kullu district also incorporates several riverine tributary valleys of the Beas, including those of the Parvati, Sainj, and Tirthan rivers, and thus some regions somewhat distant from the Kullu valley. The economy of the district relies mainly on horticulture, agriculture, tourism, and traditional handicrafts. Kullu district is part of the geographical, historical and cultural Mahasu region.

== History ==
The history of the Kullu region is believed to begin with the ancient kingdom of Kuluta. The earliest evidence comes from a centuries old coin bearing the name of King Virayasa of Kuluta. Key epigraphic records include the 4th-century AD Shalri rock inscription in the Banjar region, which clearly mentions the King Chandeshvarahastin's victory over a local ruler named Rajila where both rulers were presumably trying to control the Banjar valley. In the 7th century AD, the Chinese pilgrim Hiuen Tsang visited the area and called it Kiu-lu-to. These early records and travel accounts precede the later formation of the kingdom of Kullu.

The ancient seat of the kings of the kingdom of Kullu was the Naggar Castle,about 12 km north of the present-day town of Kullu, and was thought to have been built in the late 15th century. Raja Jagat Singh (who ruled Kullu between 1637–72) moved the capital in the middle of the 17th century from Naggar to Sultanpur, within today's Kullu town.

Kullu ended being an independent kingdom upon the invasion by Maharaja Ranjit Singh in 1839. Following, in turn, the takeover of the Sikh Empire by the British Empire, Kullu was ceded by the Sikhs to the British in 1846, whereupon it became a tehsil of the British-administered Kangra district (in turn a part of the Punjab Province, British India). The head of Kullu's royal family had been granted the Waziri Rupi by the Sikh emperor along with the title 'Rai', and this continued throughout the British period. Naggar Castle was exchanged by Raja Gyan Singh of Kullu for a rifle with Major Hay, the first Assistant Commissioner of the then-newly acquired British territory of Kullu. The Rupi Palace in Sultanpur is still used as home by the descendants of Kullu's royal family.

Upon the Independence of India, until 1960, Lahaul and Spiti continued being parts of the Kullu tehsil, as had also been the case during the British rule. In 1960, Lahaul and Spiti became a separate district. Kullu became a district of Punjab in 1963, and on November 1, 1966, it became a district of Himachal Pradesh, through the Punjab Reorganisation Act of 1966.

Since the British times, the various government offices and other government institutions built around the Dhalpur grounds, in the heart of the Kullu town, have formed the nerve centre of the district administration in Kullu district.

== Demographics ==
=== Population ===
According to the 2011 census Kullu district has a population of 437,903, roughly equal to the nation of Malta. This gives it a ranking of 553rd in India (out of a total of 640). The district has a population density of 79 inhabitants per square kilometre (200/sq mi). Its population growth rate over the decade 2001-2011 was 14.65%. Kullu has a sex ratio of 942 females for every 1000 males, and a literacy rate of 80.14%. 9.45% of the population lives in urban areas. Scheduled Castes and Scheduled Tribes make up 28.01% and 3.84% of the population respectively.

Historical population
Year	Pop.	±% p.a.
1901	119,585	—
1911	124,803	+0.43%
1921	122,027	−0.22%
1931	131,425	+0.74%
1941	137,202	+0.43%
1951	145,688	+0.60%
1961	152,925	+0.49%
1971	192,371	+2.32%
1981	238,734	+2.18%
1991	302,432	+2.39%
2001	381,571	+2.35%
2011	437,903	+1.39%

=== Language ===
At the time of the 2011 census, census, 44% of the population in the district declared Kullui as their first language, 23% opted for Pahari, 10% chose Seraji, (Note: Seraji is a dialect of Kullui, different from Sirazi in Jammu) 7.8% – Hindi, 3.2% – Mandeali, 2.5% – Nepali, 2.3% – Lahauli, 0.92% – Punjabi, 0.87% – Kangri, 0.84% – Kinnauri, and 0.41% – Tibetan.

=== Religion ===
Religions in Kullu district (2011)
Religion	Percent
Hinduism	94.92%
Buddhism	3.51%
Islam	0.68%
Other or not stated	0.89%
Distribution of religions

== Administrative ==
The administrative headquarters of the Kullu district lies at Kullu. The Kullu district has the following administrative divisions:

- Development Blocks: Kullu, Naggar, Banjar, Anni, Nirmand and Bhuntar
- Tehsils in Kullu: Kullu, Banjar, Manali, Anni, Nirmand, Bhuntar(Kullu) and Sainj(Banjar)
- Sub-Tehsils in Kullu: Jari(Kullu) and Nithar(Nirmand)
- Panchayat Samities: Kullu, Naggar, Banjar, Anni & Nirmand
- Gram Panchayats: 70 in Kullu tehsil, 40 in Naggar tehsil, 36 in Banjar tehsil, 32 in Anni tehsil, 26 in Nirmand tehsil.
- Zila Parishad: 1 (Kullu)
- Nagar Parishad: 2 (Kullu and Manali)
- Nagar Panchayats: 2 (Bhuntar and Banjar)

== Politics ==
Electorally, at the State level, Kullu contains four of the 68 assembly constituencies of the Himachal Pradesh Legislative Assembly, namely Manali, Kullu, Banjar, and Anni.

At the Central level, Kullu is a part of the Mandi Lok Sabha Constituency, one of the four such constituencies that represent the state of Himachal Pradesh in the Lok Sabha.

== Transport ==
=== By road ===
The main highway running through the Kullu district is the National Highway 3, formerly known as National Highway 21. The segment of this highway through the Kullu district begins at Aut and ends at the Atal Tunnel. This highway runs in a roughly south-north direction. To evade the usually heavy traffic between Kullu and Manali, one can take the road along the left bank of the Beas River at Kullu, so as to arrive in Manali via Naggar.

=== By air ===
The Kullu district has an airport at Bhuntar, capable of accommodating small aircraft. There are helipads at Manali, Palchan, Kullu (Dhalpur ground), and Naggar.

=== By railway ===
The Kullu district is not connected through railways.

== Economy ==
Agriculture and horticulture are the predominant sources of livelihood in the Kullu district. Wheat, maize, vegetables, and garlic are the main crops grown. Most agriculture in this mountainous district is done in the form of terrace farming. Most of this agricultural activity is subsistence level. Horticulture, particularly apple farming, has been more profitable in Kullu district. But both these activities are being negatively influenced by climate change. Cannabis farming has also been a lucrative though illegal source of income in the district, particularly since the 1980s. Forests play an important role in securing local livelihoods in the Kullu district, in the form of timber and various non-timber forest products. The district is also rich in medicinal herbs. No major minerals are found in the district. However, the district is rich in hydroelectric potential, and has several major hydroelectric projects, including the Parbati hydroelectric project. Some valleys in the district contain historic seasonal migration routes of the Gaddi and Gujjar transhumant communities. Tourism is a major source livelihood at many places in the Kullu district, in the form of hotels, homestays, restaurants, travel agencies, shops, dhabas, guiding services, cooks, porters, and taxi services. Tourism has had a major ecological footprint in the district. The handloom-based production and sale of Kullu shawls is also important in some parts of the Kullu district. Service sector industries, in field such as tourism, education, floriculture, and livestock and poultry farming have a good scope of growth in the district. There is no large-scale industry in the Kullu district. Geographic constraints and difficulty of access inhibit the growth of industries in the Kullu district.

== Institutions for Himalayan knowledge ==
[This section does not cover the schools, colleges, and universities of Kullu district.]

The Kullu district is rich in both ecological wealth and cultural and historical heritage. At the same time, Kullu is not far from regions such as the Trans-Himalayas and Tibet, and lies on an important historic trade route from Punjab to Ladakh and Central Asia. In modern times, these features of the Kullu valley have drawn many researchers, scientists, artists, and seekers of other kinds to it.

The Urusvati Himalayan Research Institute was the first institution in the Kullu region, dedicated to research on various sciences and mysticism in the Himalayas. The Roerich family established this centre in 1928 at Naggar upon their return from their Central-Asian Expedition. By World War II, the institute had become defunct. Nonetheless, the site of the former institute, a part of the Roerich estate in Naggar, continues to operate a library and some exhibitions.

The Himalayan Institute of Cultural and Heritage Studies (HICHS), founded by Dr. Sonali Gupta, was based in Katrain village, 30 km north of Kullu, until early 2023. This institution used to offer curated heritage walks in the Kullu valley; conducted on-site and online courses related to Himalayan cultures, religions, iconography, and architecture, and hosted weekly online talks by scholars and artists from India and around the world whose work featured the Himalayas. In 2023, the institute relocated to Bigri village near Dhami, Shimla district.

At present, there are two institutions in Kullu that are active in generating and preserving Himalaya-specific knowledge:

- Himalayan Regional Centre of the GB Pant Institute of Himalayan Environment and Development - This institution is based in Mohal, about 6 km south of Kullu. It was established in Kullu in 1992, and shifted to Mohal in 1993. This government institution conducts research and informs policy on various issues related to climate change, mountain ecology, traditional ecological knowledge, and rural livelihoods.
- Himachal Pradesh Craftsmanship and Design Innovation Institute NORTH - This institute is based in Naggar, 22 km north of Kullu. It was established in 2017. This institution works to preserve Kullu's traditional kathkuni architectural style.

== Attractions ==
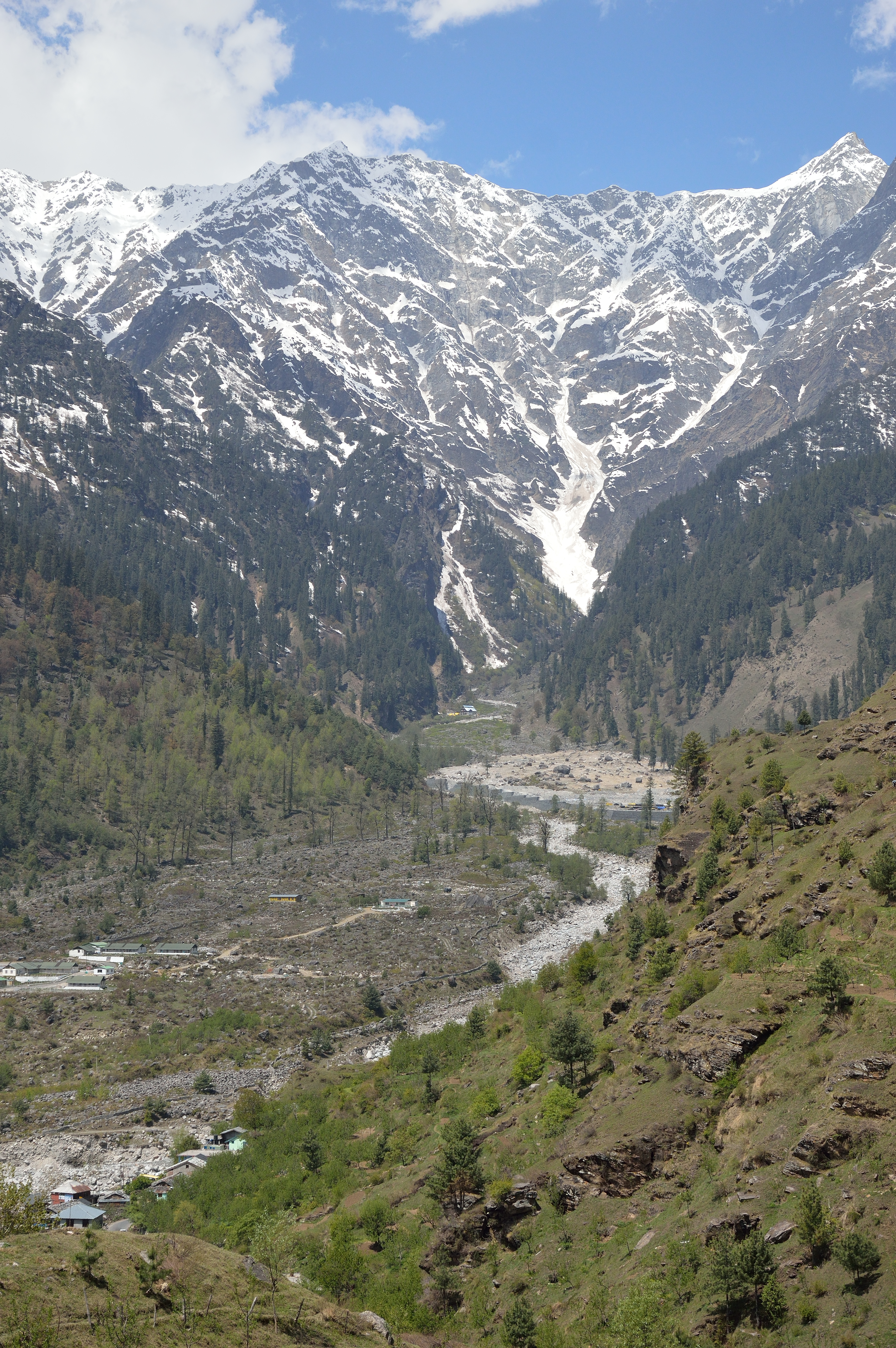
View of Himalayas in the upper parts of the Kullu valley.

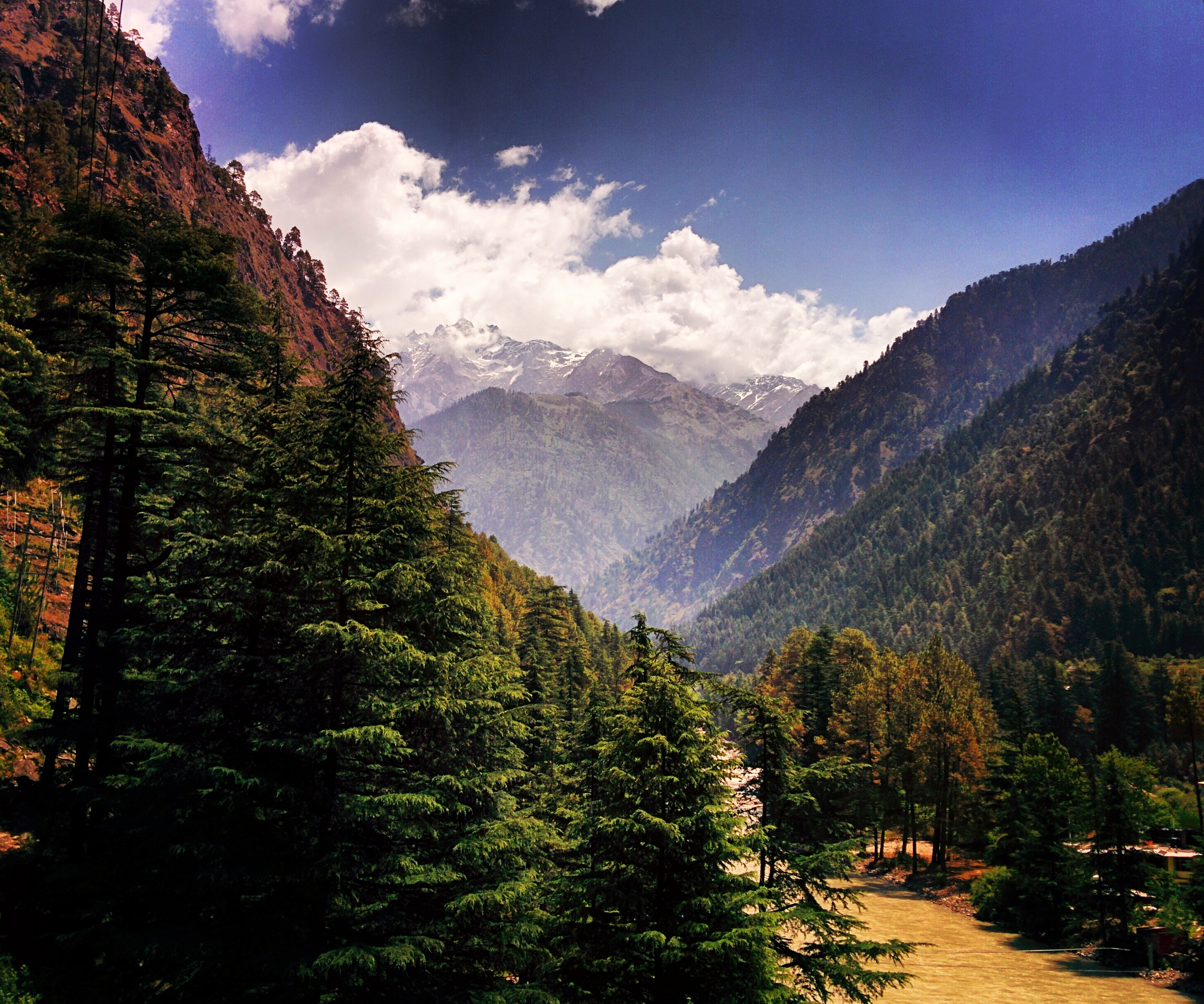
Parvati Valley

The Hidimba Devi Temple also known as the Hadimba Temple

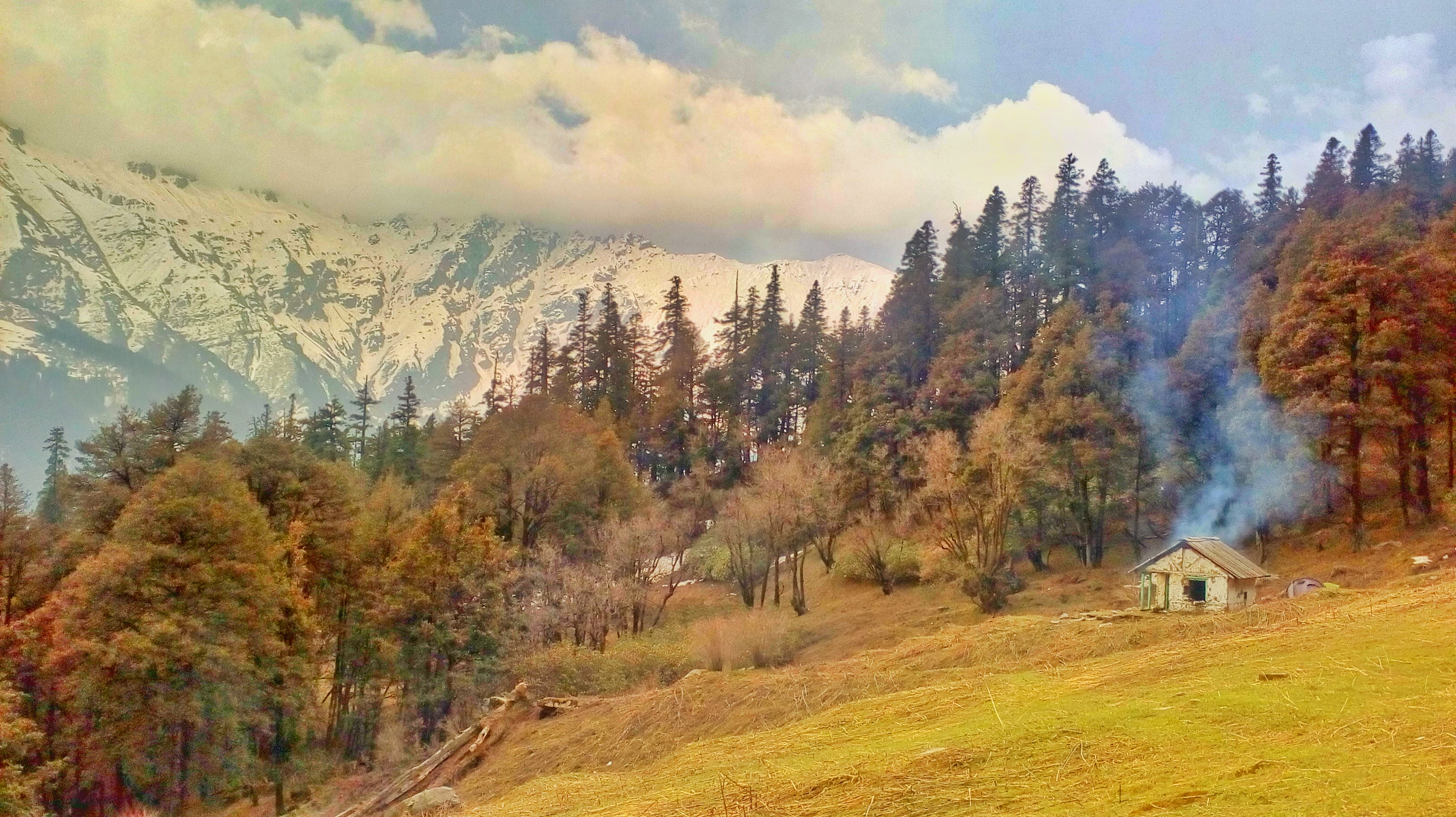
Nada Thach, Tirthan Valley

Particularly since the onset of the unrest in Kashmir in the 1980s, the Kullu region has gained in significance as a tourist destination. The Kullu valley is known as the "Valley of the Gods" or "Dev Bhumi" because almost every village in the valley has a local deity and annual festivities around them. The following is a non-exhaustive list of historical, cultural, religious, scenic, and ecological places of interest in the Kullu district.

=== Places of interest ===
- Basheshwar Mahadev Temple - This Shiva temple at Bajaura is made completely out of stone in the Shikhara style, and is renowned for its intricate sculpture art. Archeologically, the temple is dated to around the early 9th century A.D. In local belief, this temple is believed to have been built by the Pandavas.
- Bhuti Weavers Co-operative Society - This society is involved in the Kullu shawl industry. It was set up in 1944. Its main office and showroom are located at the Bhutti Colony in Shamshi, about 8 km south of Kullu.
- Bijli Mahadev Temple - It is located at 2,435 meters from sea level and is about 10 km (6.2 mi) from Kullu. The staff of the temple is 60 feet high and can be seen from the Kullu valley too. It is the highest point around Kullu from where there are views of the whole town.
- Chaini Kothi - A 35 meters-high tower built in the Kathkuni style, built originally as a defensive structure and from later on used as a temple for a Jogini. It dates to the 17th century. It is located in the Tirthan valley near Banjar.
- Dagpo Shedrup Ling monastery - This Tibetan Buddhist monastery of the Gelug school is located in village Kais, 8 km north from Kullu. It was inaugurated in 2005 by the Fourteenth Dalai Lama. This monastery is a continuation of the Dagpo Dratsang monastery in southeastern Tibet, which was destroyed during the Cultural Revolution.
- Dechen Choekhor monastery - This Tibetan Buddhist monastery of the Drukpa Kagyu school is located in village Sarabhai, 13 km south from Kullu. Its construction was started in 2000 and completed in 2017. It is a continuation of a monastery of the same name in Tibet, which was destroyed during the Cultural Revolution.
- Great Himalayan National Park (GHNP) -This national park is spread over 700 km (430 mi) in Banjar sub-division of Kullu District. The park is drained by the Sainj, Tirthan, Jiwa Nala, and Parvati rivers. It is home to many different and often rare kinds of birds, mammals, insects, and vegetation. The park was created in 1984 and became a UNESCO World Heritage Site in 2014. Entering the Park requires permits.
- Khirganga National Park Established in 2010, Khirganga (also written as Keerganga) National Park is in Kullu district. It is spread in an area of 710 km^{2}. at a height of 550 m. This national park is home to a wide variety of flora and fauna.
- Inderkilla National Park Established in 2010, Inderkilla National Park is situated in Kullu district. It covers an area of around 104 km^{2}, and its fauna includes over 250 bird species and animals such as leopards, brown bear, black bear and mountain goats.
- Hadimba Temple - This pagoda-style temple is located in the Dungri forest above Manali. It houses the footsteps of Hadimba Devi on a rock inside. It was built by Raja Bahadur Singh in 1553 A.D.
- Kais Dhar - A place with grass meadows and densely forested mountains. It is a part of trekking route and is not connected through road, hence the natural environment is preserved. This place has a British-era forest rest house.
- Kasol - A village in the Parvati valley that is popular among backpackers; also known as 'Little Israel' for being very popular among young Israeli tourists.
- Tirthan Valley - The valley is drained by the Tirthan River and its various tributaries, along with several streams, waterfalls, and other water bodies. It is very rich in biodiversity, and supports a rich variety of flora, fauna and birdlife attracting birdwatchers and nature enthusiasts.
- Khanag - This village in Anni tehsil has an old rest house with a memorial to the English travel writer Penelope Chetwode, who died in a remote part of the Kullu district in April 1986. Chetwode loved the Kullu valley, and is known for her book Kulu: the End of the Habitable World.
- Khokhan - A pagoda-style temple of Adi Brahma, dating to the 14th century A.D., is located in village Khokhan, about 10 km south of Kullu town. The village also boasts open views of the confluence of the Parvati and Beas rivers, and of the Kullu airport.
- Lug valley - Another important valley in the district is the Lug valley, where forest contractors have been extracting timber from the forests for the last 150 years and continue to do so today.
- Maha Devi Tirth Temple - Shri Mahadevi Tirth, locally known more commonly as Vaishno Devi Mandir, is a temple situated about two kilometers North from Kullu on the Kullu-Manali highway. It was built in 1966.
- Malana - Malana is a relatively secluded village in the Kullu valley, known for its several unique cultural features. These include a language different from the rest of the Kullu region; worship of Jamlu devta, a god considered somewhat hostile by the Kullu Pantheon; a complex system of local-self governance; a weaker prevalence of caste distinctions, and a strong belief of contact with people outside the village being highly polluting. The village is much more connected to the outside world than it was in the 1950s, when Colin Rosser conducted perhaps the earliest detailed research on this village.
- Manali - Perhaps the most famous tourist destination of the Kullu valley. This town includes a Mall Road, the Hadimba Temple, a Tibetan market, and Old Manali, besides hundreds of hotels, resorts, and restaurants. Near Manali are sites like the Solang valley (common site for adventure and winter sports), the hot springs at Vashisht, the Atal Bihari Vajpayee Institute of Mountaineering and Allied Sports, and the Snow and Avalanche Study Establishment.
- Manikaran - A pilgrimage centre for Hindus and Sikhs in the Parvati valley, known for its hot springs.
- Mathasaur - Mathasaur is a scenic meadow located at the top of the Lug valley. It has a small temple dedicated to the female deity Fungni Mata, which has certain taboos around entry, as do most other temples in the Kullu region. One has to hike to reach the meadow and the temple.

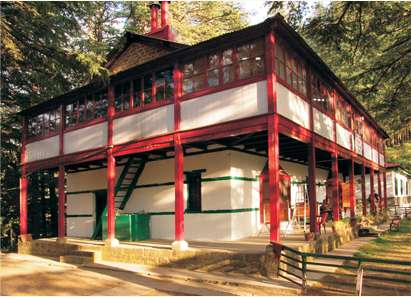
Himalayan Research Institute named Urusvati in Naggar

- Naggar - Naggar was the old capital of Kullu. Its 15th century castle, built in the Kathkuni style, is now a hotel run by Himachal Tourism. Naggar also has the Roerich's Memorial House, and the Nicholas Roerich and Svetsolav Roerich Art Gallery. The Russian scholar, artist, and mystic Nicholas Roerich lived at this site from the late 1920s till his death here in 1947. Naggar also has several old temples, built in the shikhara and pagoda styles.
- Nirmand - One of the largest villages of Himachal Pradesh. Recorded in the Nirmand Copper Plate (7th century A.D.), and known for its ancient temples, including one dedicated to Parshurama.
- Raghunath Temple - In the 17th century, Raja Jagat Singh of Kullu committed a great mistake. To atone for the sin, he sent a senior courtier to Ayodhya for a statue of Lord Raghunath - Lord Ram. This temple was built in 1651 A.D. by Raja Jagat Singh to house the image, which continues to be greatly revered. Every year, the international fair Dussehra is celebrated with local deities in honour of Lord Raghunath.
- Rohtang Pass - The Kullu valley connects with the Lahul and Spiti district via Rohtang Pass, situated at 3,978 m (13,051 ft) 51 km (32 mi) from Manali city. In 2020, the Atal Tunnel was inaugurated, which bypasses the Pass and dramatically reduces the distance and effort required in getting from the Kullu valley to the Lahaul and Spiti valleys. But the pass continues to be a tourist attraction. Permits are required to visit the pass.
- Rupi Palace - Located in Sultanpur, Kullu, this palace was originally built in 1660 A.D. by Raja Jagat Singh. It was badly damaged in the Kangra earthquake of 1905, and was subsequently rebuilt. It is the residence of the descendants of Kullu's royal family.
- Shoja - At 2368m, Shoja presents a vantage point for panoramic views of Himalayan ranges. Places of interest near Shoja include the Jalori Pass (3,140m), Jibhi, Serolsar Lake, Raghupur fort, and the Tirthan valley.
- Shringi Rishi Temple - Shringi Rishi Temple is located in the Banjar valley, about 60 km from Kullu. Shringi Rishi is the ruling deity of Banjar valley. Shringi rishi is one among the "Atthara kardoo" (eighteen chief deities) of the Kullu valley.
- Shandilya Rishi Mandir - The temple is attributed to the Vedic sage Maharshi Shandilya. It is located at Shalin village in the Uji valley
- Shrikhand Mahadev - One of Five Kailash Peaks, considered to be an abode of Lord Shiva and his wife Goddess Parvati
- Tirthan WLS - A Wildlife Sanctuary located in Banjar subdivision offering numerous flora and fauna species. In 2021, it was ranked the Best Managed Protected Area of India as per the Management Effectiveness Evaluation

=== Festivals ===
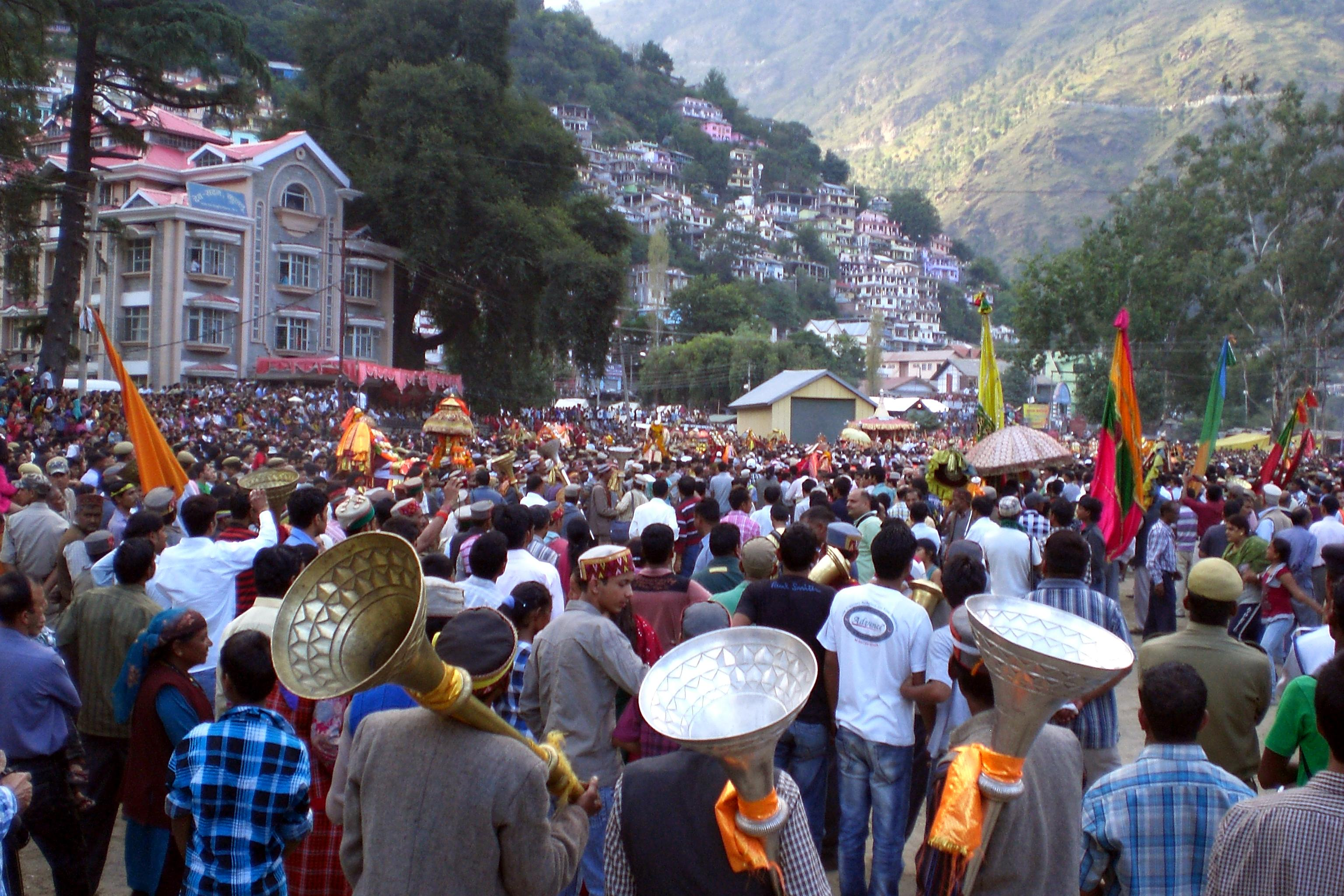
Kullu Dussehra

- Kullu Dussehra - The Kullu region is known for its unique celebration of the Dussehra festival in the Dhalpur grounds. The origins of Kullu's version of Dussehra lie in the mid-seventeenth century. It typically takes place in the month of October, which overlaps with the traditional period of the white lunar half of the month of Ashvin. It includes a rath yatra, a week-long congregation of deities from all parts of the Kullu region (including distant parts such as Banjar and Nirmand), a series of cultural performances, and a large fair that lasts several weeks.
- Pipal Jatar - This is a spring festival celebrated towards the end of April every year, with a large fair held in Kullu's Dhalpur ground.

=== Outdoor sports ===
- Angling/Fishing - The Kullu valley has numerous places for trout fishing. These include Katrain, Raison, Kasol and Naggar, then along the river Tirthan near Larji, in the Sainj Valley and in the Hurla khud.
- Mountaineering - People interested in mountaineering can take basic to instructor-level training at the Atal Bihari Vajpayee Institute of Mountaineering and Allied Sports. The district has several peaks popular with mountaineers, such as Hanuman Tibba, Papsura, and Indrasan.
- Paragliding - Paragliding is offered at certain sites in the Kullu valley, such as Dobhi and Solang valley. However, there have been several fatal accidents in this sport in Kullu valley.
- Rafting - White water rafting is popular as a tourist activity on the Beas river. The Atal Bihari Vajpayee Institute of Mountaineering and Allied Sports also offers courses in rafting and kayaking.
- Rock climbing and bouldering - In recent years, several places near Manali, such as Sethan and Aleo, have emerged as popular rock climbing and bouldering sites.
- Skiing, heli-skiing, and snowboarding - These winter sports are possible in areas near Manali, such as the slopes of Solang valley and Hamta.
- Trekking - The district possesses numerous trekking routes, with possibilities ranging from single-day hikes to multi-day treks. Some popular multi-day treks are the Bhrigu Lake trek; the Chandrakhani Pass to Malana trek, and the Pin-Parvati Pass trek. The Great Himalayan National Park also has several moderate to strenuous trekking routes.

== Gallery ==
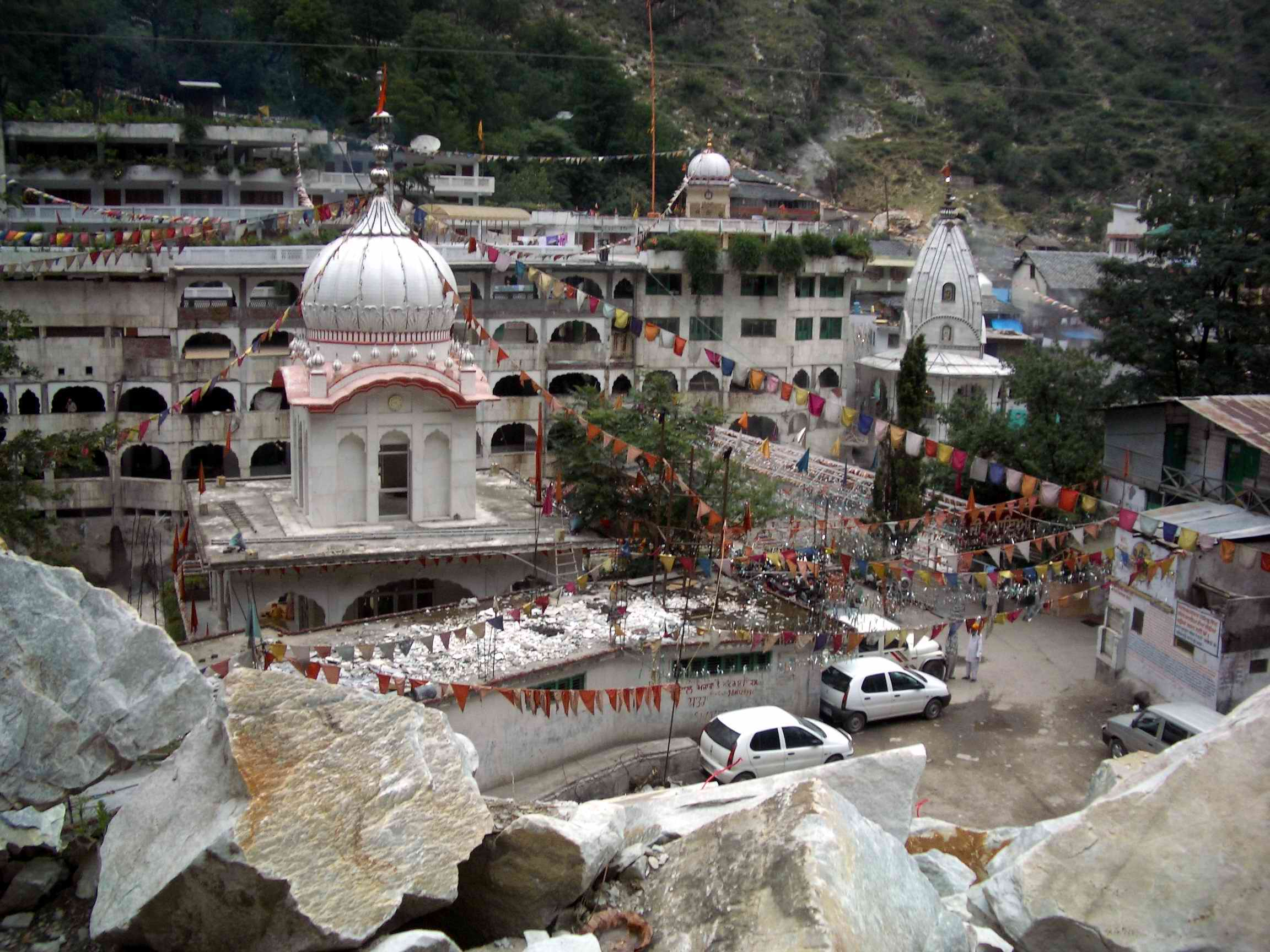
The Gurdwara and a temple at Manikaran, in 2004.

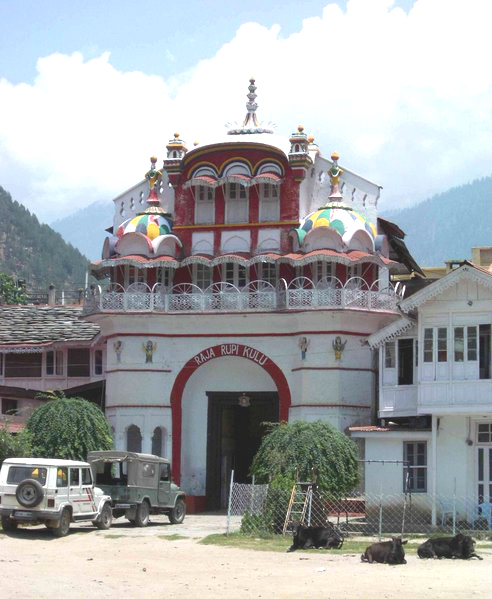
Raja Rupi Kulu Palace, 2004

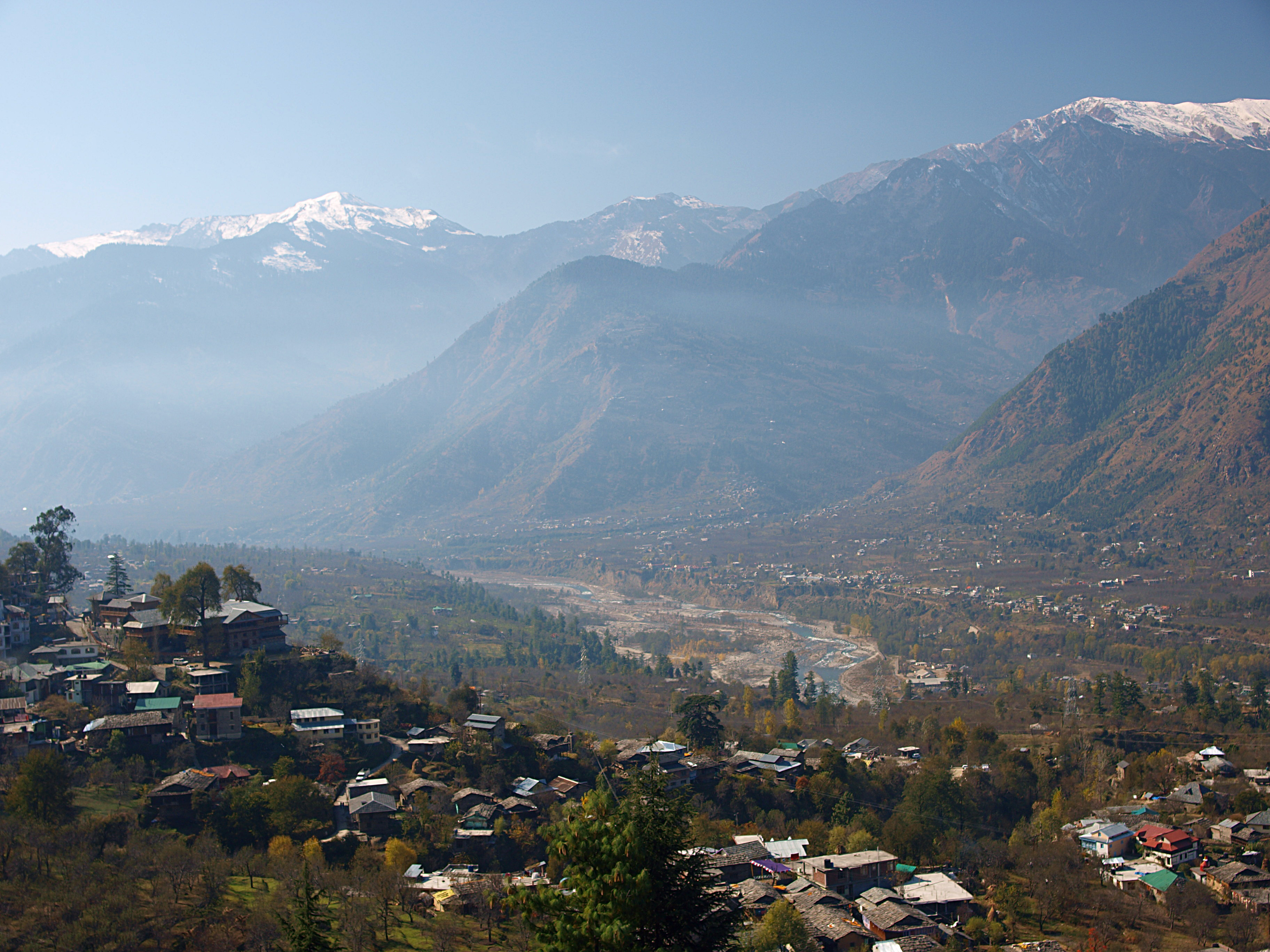
A view from the Kullu valley.

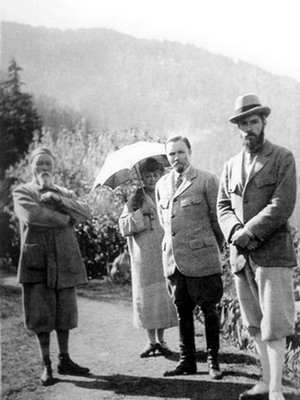
The Roerich family in Kullu valley

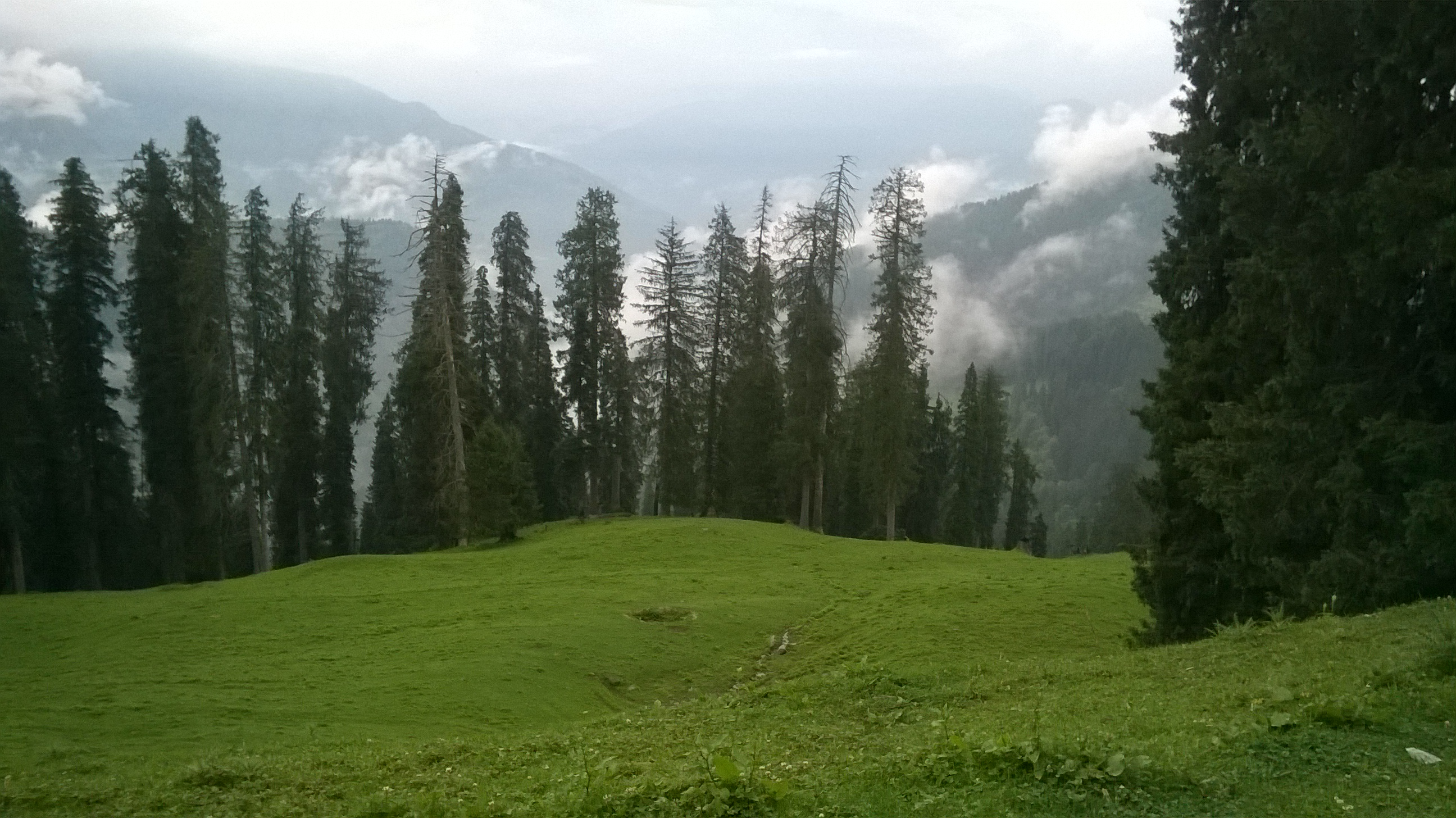
Kais Dhar

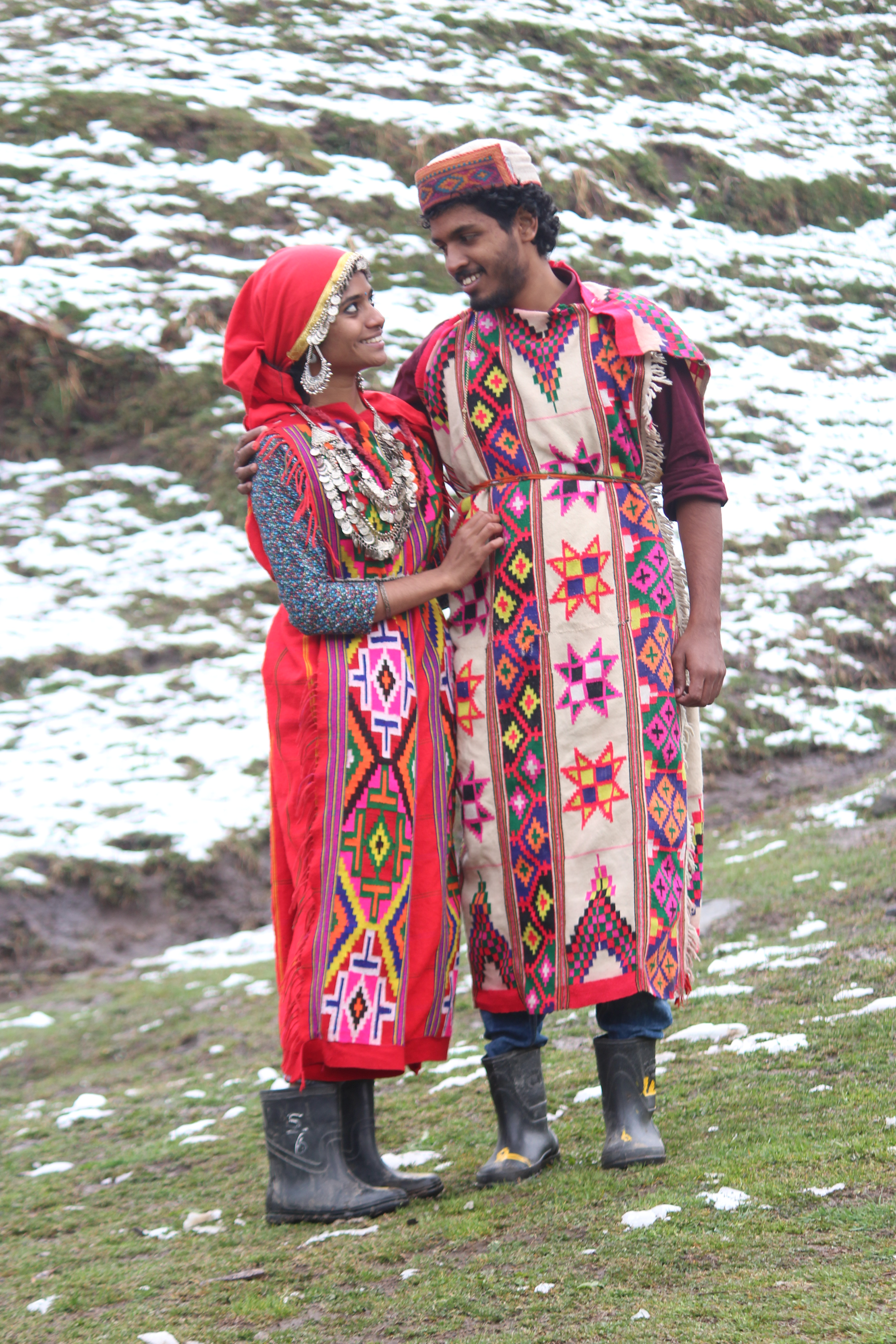
Tourists posing in traditional Kullu attire, at Solang valley

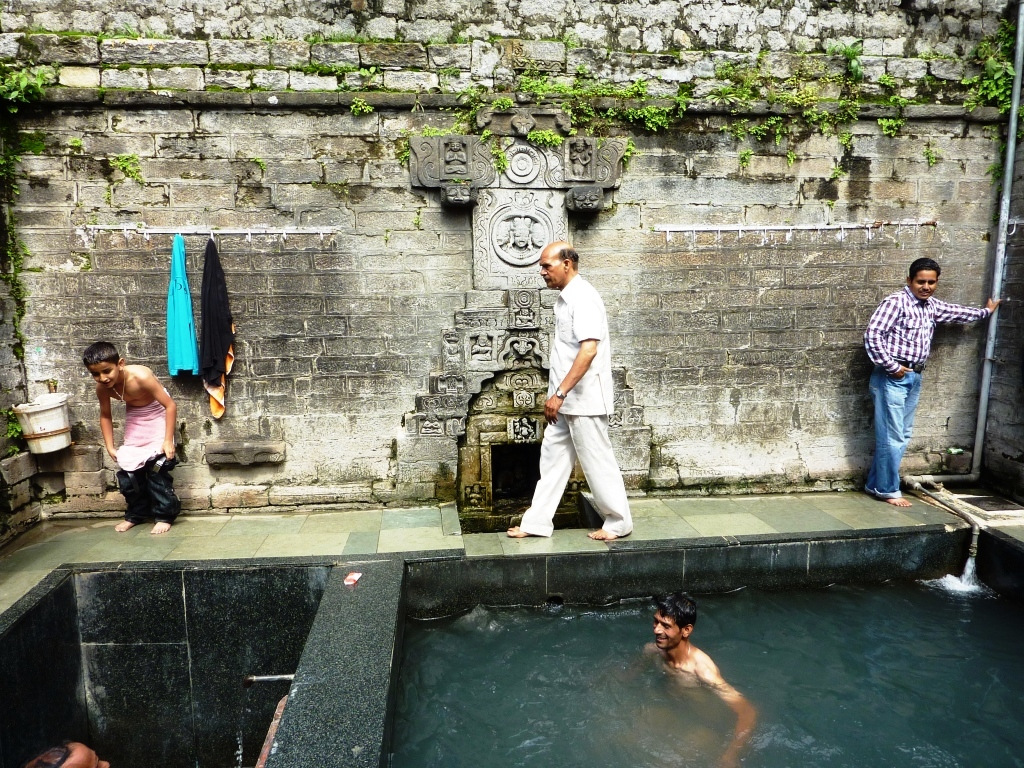
Hot Springs at Vashisht, near Manali. 2020.

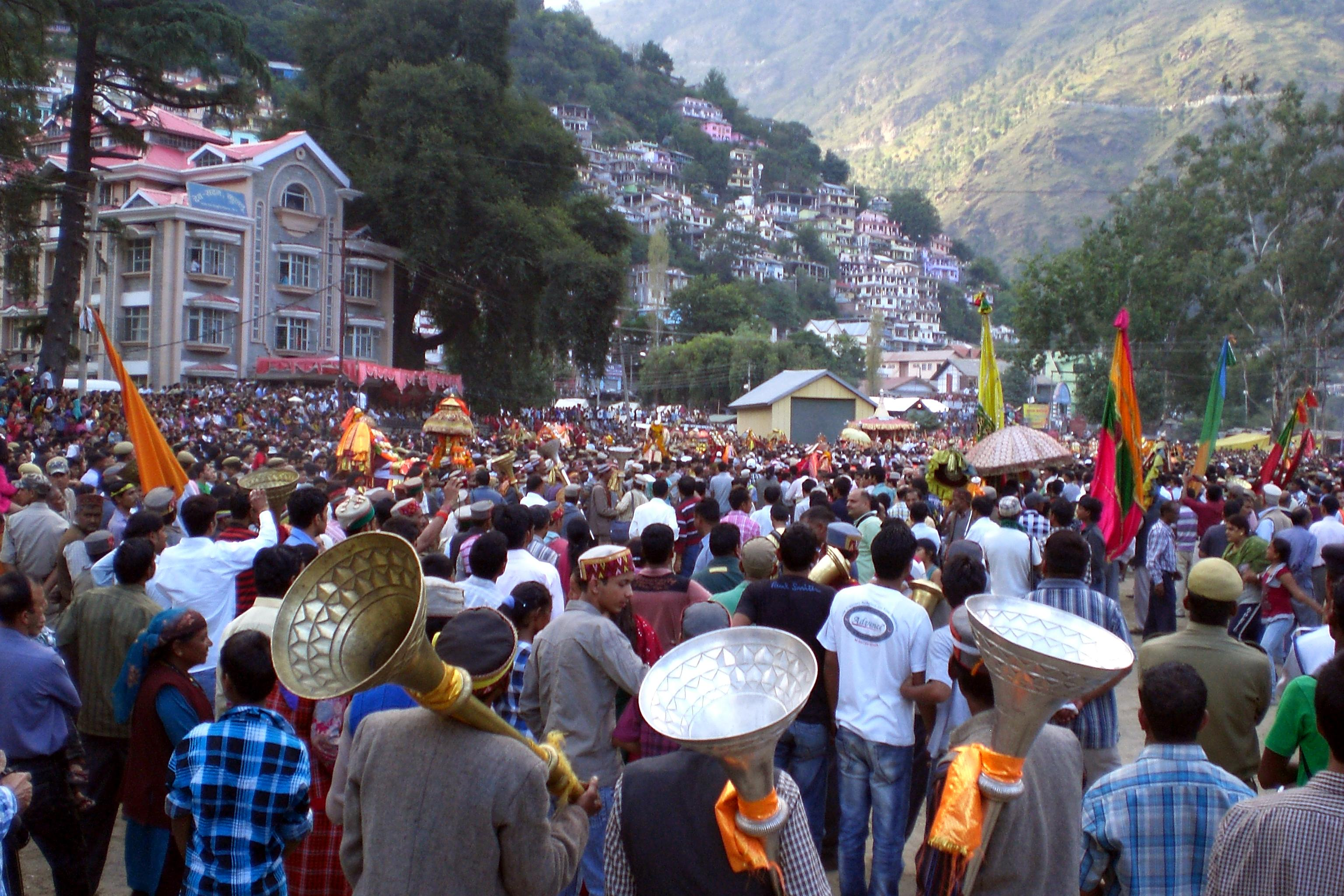
Crowds of deities and devotees at the Dhalpur ground, on the opening day of Kullu Dussehra, 2011.

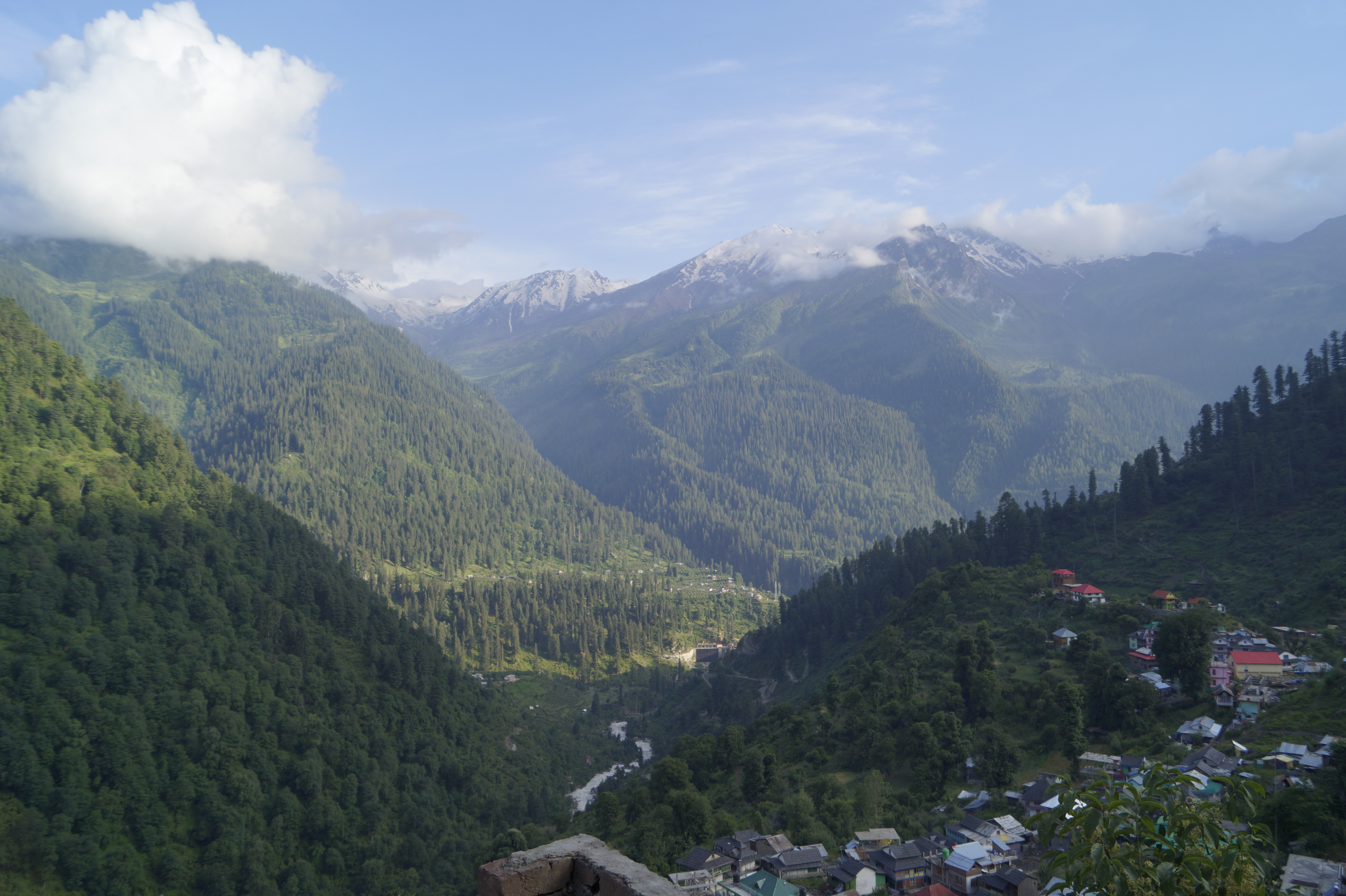
View from Tosh village, Parvati valley, Kullu district. 2017.

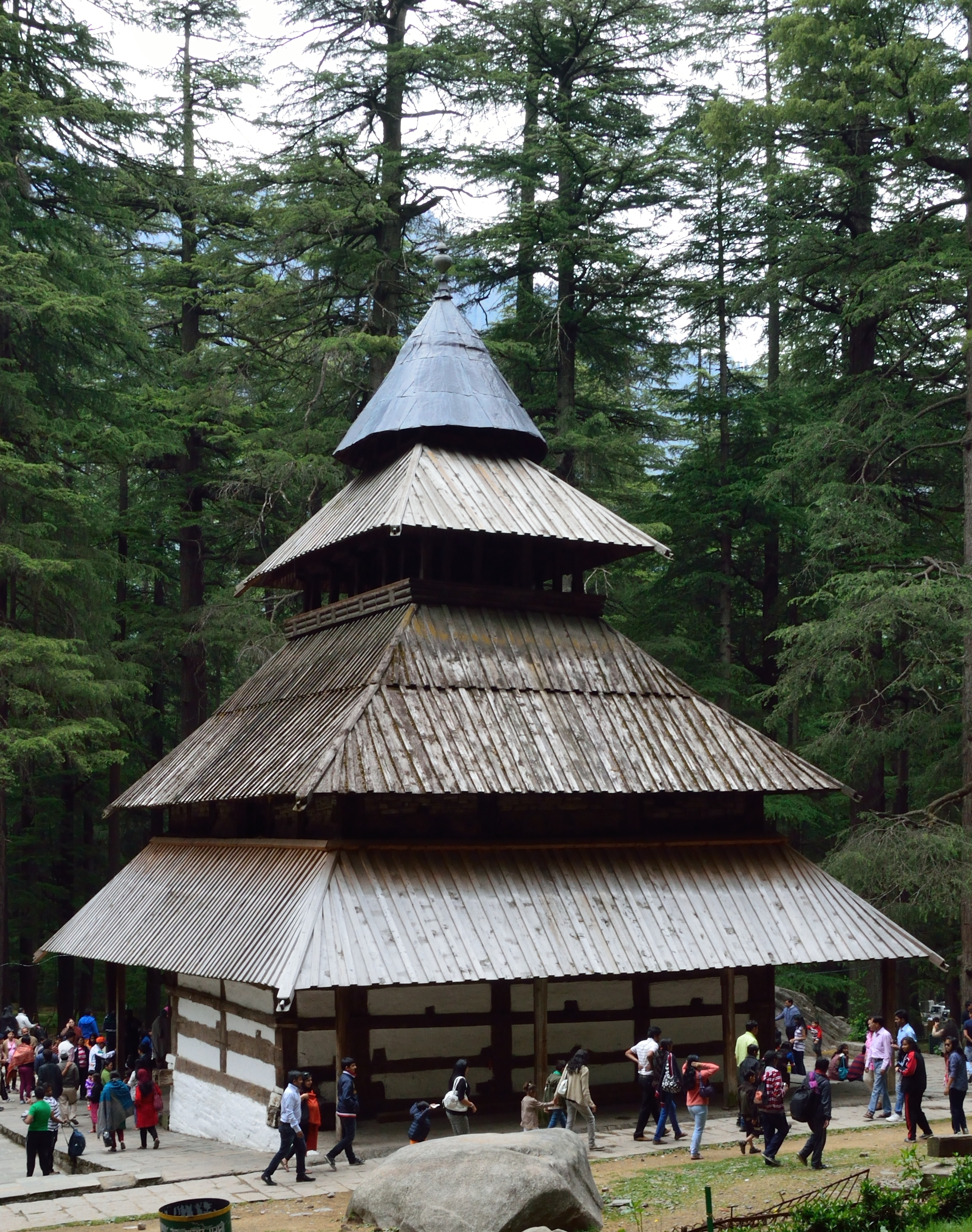
Hadimba Devi Temple, Manali.

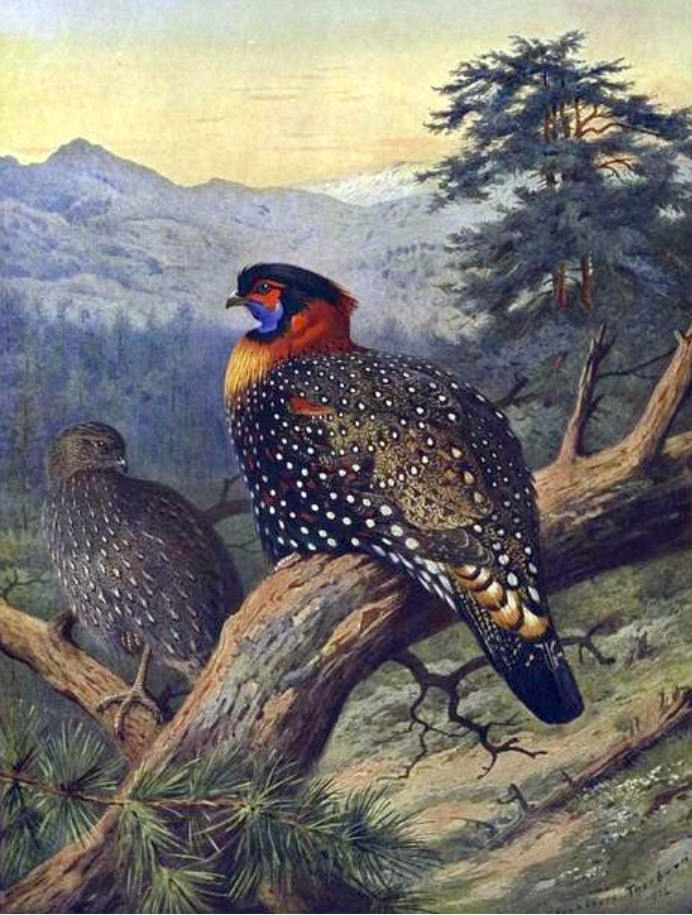
Western Tragopan, an extremely rare bird found in the Kullu district.

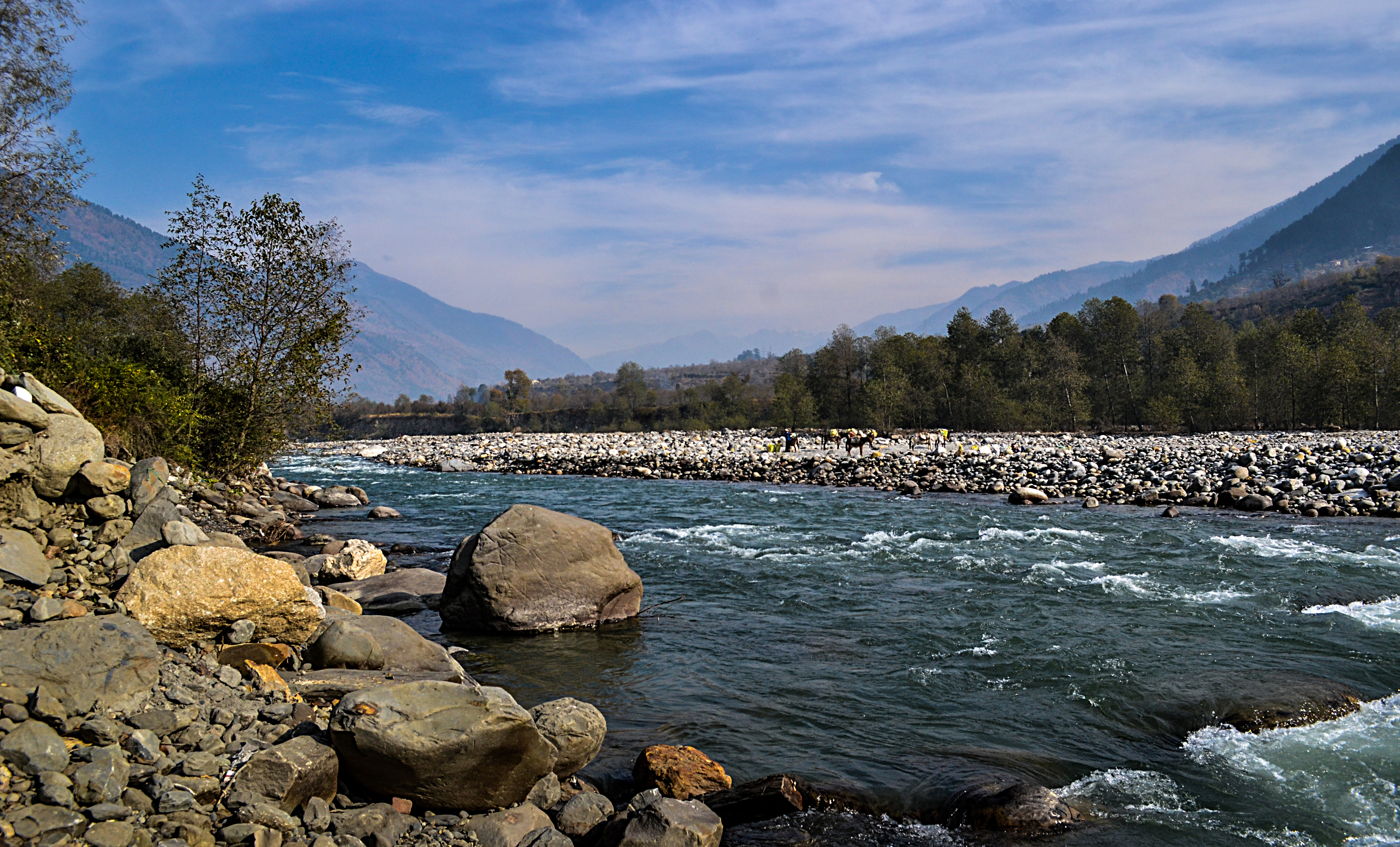
The Beas River, near Manali.

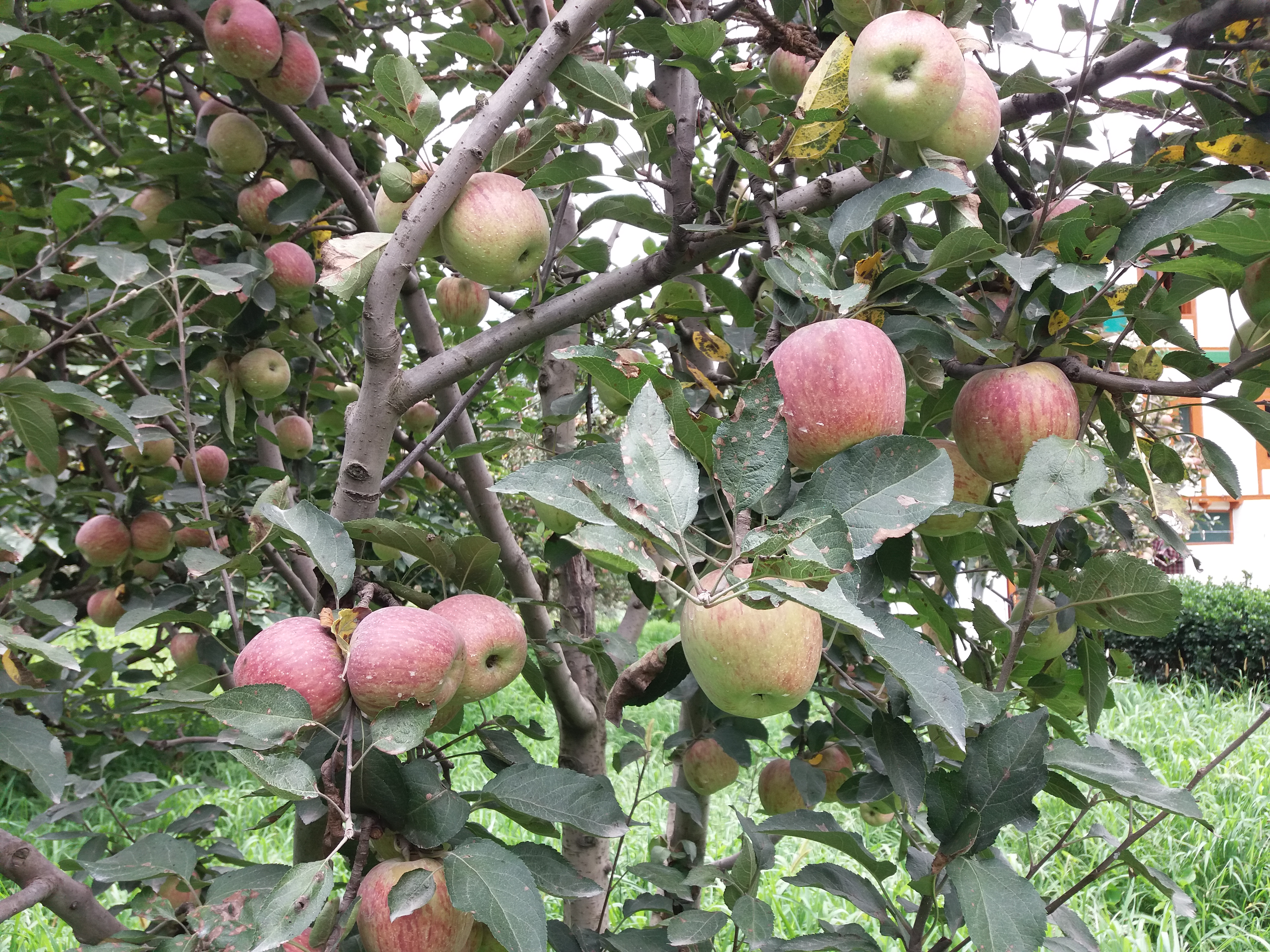
An apple tree at Dobi in Kullu valley.

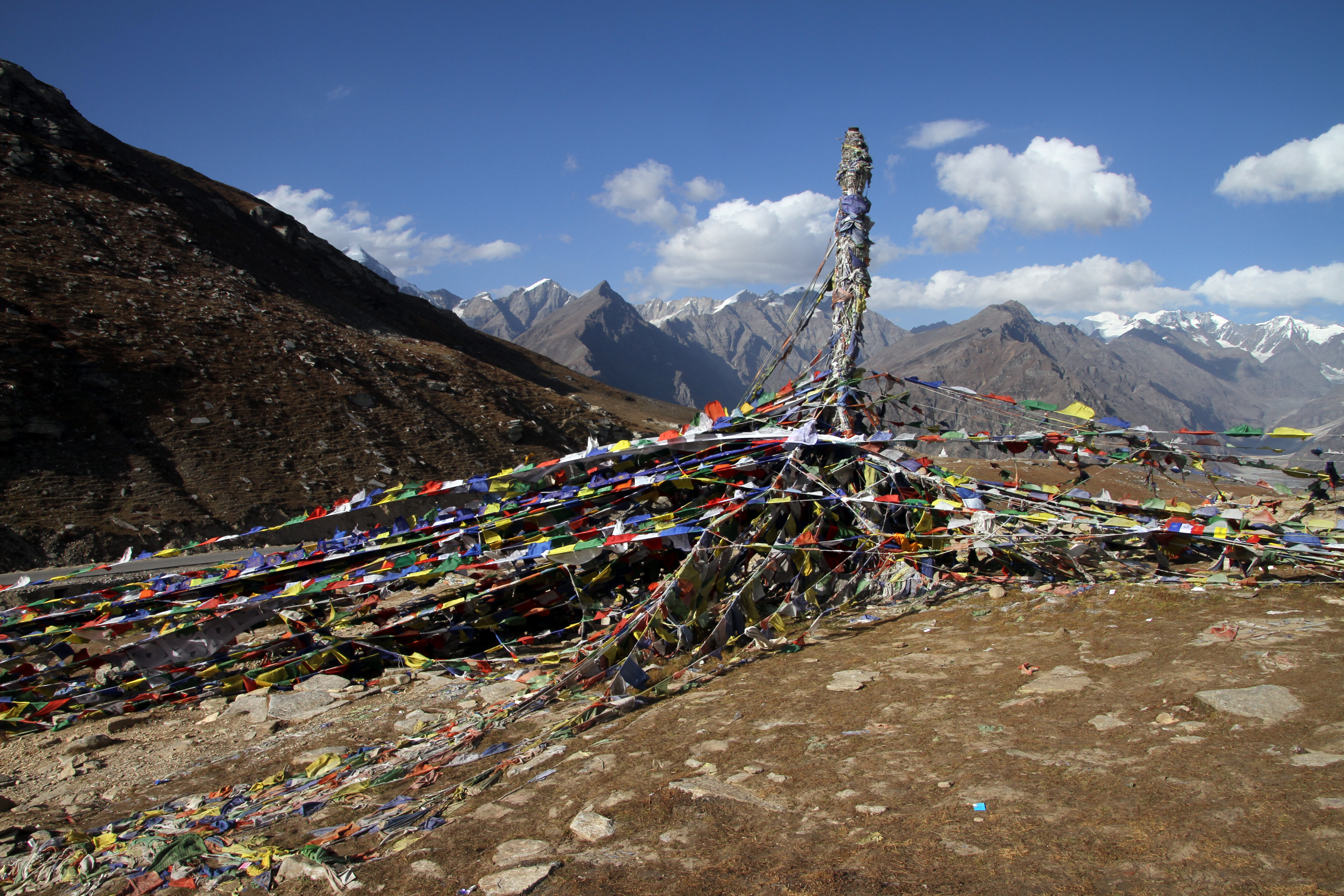
The Rohtang Pass.
