= Parbati Hydroelectric Project =

Indian water energy project

Located at Behali village in Kullu district of Himachal Pradesh, Parbati Hydroelectric Project is a pondage scheme that involves construction of a gravity type concrete dam, procuring bolster to the hydropower potential of river Parbati, Panch Nallah, Manihar Nallah, Huria Nallah and Sainj River.

Parbati Hydropower Scheme is a 2GW hydroelectric project which was planned to be developed in three stages. Parbati-I project was abandoned due to environmental failures. The work on Parbati-II and Parbati-III was started simultaneously.

The Parbati-II hydroelectric project is being developed in Pulga and Suind villages, in the Kullu district of Himachal Pradesh. The project consists of construction of a 83.7m-high concrete gravity dam in the Pulga village in the downstream of Parbati River and Tosh Nallah, and surface powerhouse with four Pelton Turbine Generator units with 200 MW capacity each. This project suffered an accidental fire which was caused by a short circuit, the fire damaged the project machinery and several engineers were injured. In 2017 during the testing, a leakage in the surge shaft and power house destroyed the crops of the nearby villages. On 19 September 2026, water escaped through a malfunctioning air-pressure valve on the head-race tunnel near Adit 5 and carried debris from a muck dumping site into Palchara village near Rella, damaging houses and agricultural land; a preliminary estimate put the damage to a house and other infrastructure at ₹1–1.5 crore, excluding agricultural losses. The Kullu district administration ordered an inquiry.

With live storage of 1.2825 MCM, the project Parbati-III consists of 43.0 m high rock fill dam at Suind and four penstocks of 3.0m diameter each. The underground powerhouse of the Parbati power station is located on the left bank of the Sainj River which has 4 generating units, each with a capacity rating of 130 MW. Major states and union territories like Chandigarh, Delhi, Himachal Pradesh, Haryana, Jammu and Kashmir, Punjab, Rajasthan, Uttarakhand, and Uttar Pradesh are the beneficiaries of this power station.
