= Lug Valley =

Valley in Himachal Pradesh, India

Coordinates: 31.948°N 77.110°E

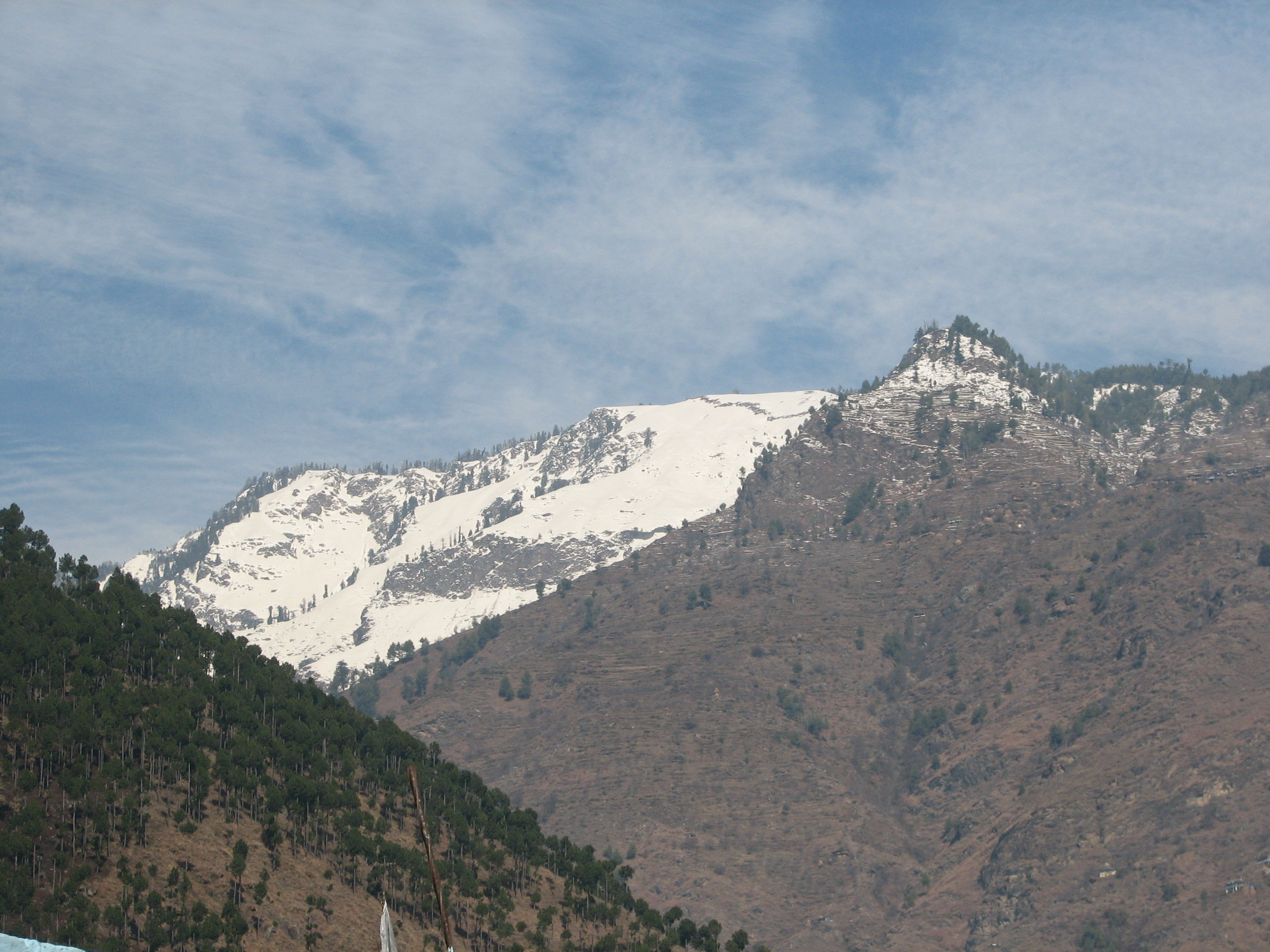
Lug valley

Lug Valley is a valley in the Kullu District of the Himalayan region in the state of Himachal Pradesh, India.

For the last 150 years, the people of the valley have been forest contractors in extracting timber from the forest. Today, the main forest contractors in the Himalayan region are still found in the Lug valley.

The Lug valley in Kullu is reportedly the place where the concept of using cables and trolleys for transportation was first employed by the British Forest Department to transport timber out of Himachal Pradesh forests in the early twentieth century. The valley comprises approximately 90 to 100 villages, including prominent settlements such as Bhalyani, Tiun, shalang, garamnag falan telang Dughilag and Churla. Since 2016, Lug Valley has experienced a major agricultural shift from traditional apple orchards to intensive persimmon (Japanese fruit) cultivation. Due to its high production volume and favorable climate, the valley—particularly around the village of Churla—has emerged as a major commercial hub for persimmon farming in India, earning it the local moniker of "Persimmon Paradise." Lug Valley is a peaceful, and religiously significant place. Tourism is expected to grow here in the future, especially after the Bhu bhu jot tunnel is built. To start, head to Bhalyani Village, home to the Katrusi Narayan temple, a 500-year-old Deodar tree, a large open ground, and a natural cold-water source. Next, reach Mathasour, which features a vast ground that is about three to four times larger than the one in Bhalyani. Here, on the mountain peaks, you'll find the Fungni Mata temple and lake nestled among Deodar and Pine trees. Continuing on, there is a beautiful lake in the Deodar forests at Badasour. The next stop is Taraur Garh, at a very high altitude, where clouds often lie below you during the monsoon, offering panoramic views. After Taraur Garh, you can visit Kaisdhar, which is a beautiful place, and then exit toward Kullu city via Peej or Lot. Throughout this route, you may see wildlife like wild boars, jackals, wild fowl, leopards, bears, and various types of snakes.
