= Chehni Kothi =

Himachali-style building

- Banjar, Himachal Pradesh
- Chehni Kothi

Site information
- Type: Temple tower
- Open to the public: No

Location
- Shown within Himachal Pradesh
- Coordinates: 31.627605°N 77.358027°E
- Height: 45 meters

Site history
- In use: Temple
- Materials: Stone

Chehni Kothi is a traditional Kath Kuni-style fortified tower with a temple inside, located in Chehni village, Banjar, Himachal Pradesh, India. The 350-year-old 12-storey-high structure is made in the "Kath Kuni" method (Kath meaning "wood", and Kuni, "corner"), using only stones and wood without cement or nails. It has a temple inside, but was originally built as a fort.

The tower’s age is uncertain, but it is generally regarded as a several-century-old structure (often dated to the 17th century) and is one of the largest surviving wooden towers of its kind in the Western Himalayas. Its layered wood-and-stone construction and sloping slate roof exemplify the indigenous building techniques of Himachal Pradesh.

== History ==
The origins of Chehni Kothi are obscure, but local tradition and travel accounts date the structure to the early modern period. A recent article notes that Chehni Kothi is a "17th-century wooden fortress" at Chehni village. According to one account, the tower served as the fortified residence of a local ruler (often referred to in lore as "Queen Chaini"). In this view, Chehni Kothi originally functioned as a defensive stronghold for the village, with thick stone walls on the lower floors and wooden living quarters above. An adjacent shorter tower historically served as the temple's treasury, guarded by a local official known as the Dev Bhandari or Sundar Bhandari.

By the 19th century Chehni Kothi was an established temple complex. Regional histories imply that it has survived several natural disasters; in fact, it has long been celebrated for withstanding Himalayan earthquakes. Later narratives claim that the tower suffered partial damage during the great 1905 Kangra earthquake. Whether or not this accounts for the tower’s current height, villagers later undertook repairs and community-led restoration work to stabilize the building.

== Architecture and Construction Techniques ==
Chehni Kothi exemplifies the traditional kath-kuni construction technique of Himachal Pradesh, which uses alternating layers of timber and stone to create sturdy, earthquake-resistant walls. The term kath kuni itself derives from the Sanskrit kashth (wood) and kona (corner), reflecting the method of laid logs at the corners of stone masonry. In Chehni Kothi’s case, each course of the wall consists of roughly cut local stone interspersed with horizontal beams of deodar wood. Notably, no mortar or metal fasteners are used. The weight of the stone and the interlock of wood pegs ("kadil" joints) hold the structure together. A high stone plinth raises the building above ground level to protect it from snowmelt and moisture, while the wood layers provide flexibility. This double-skin wall is effective at insulating the interior and dissipating seismic forces. The air gaps within the wall cavity allow thermal insulation and also act as a built-in shock absorber during tremors.

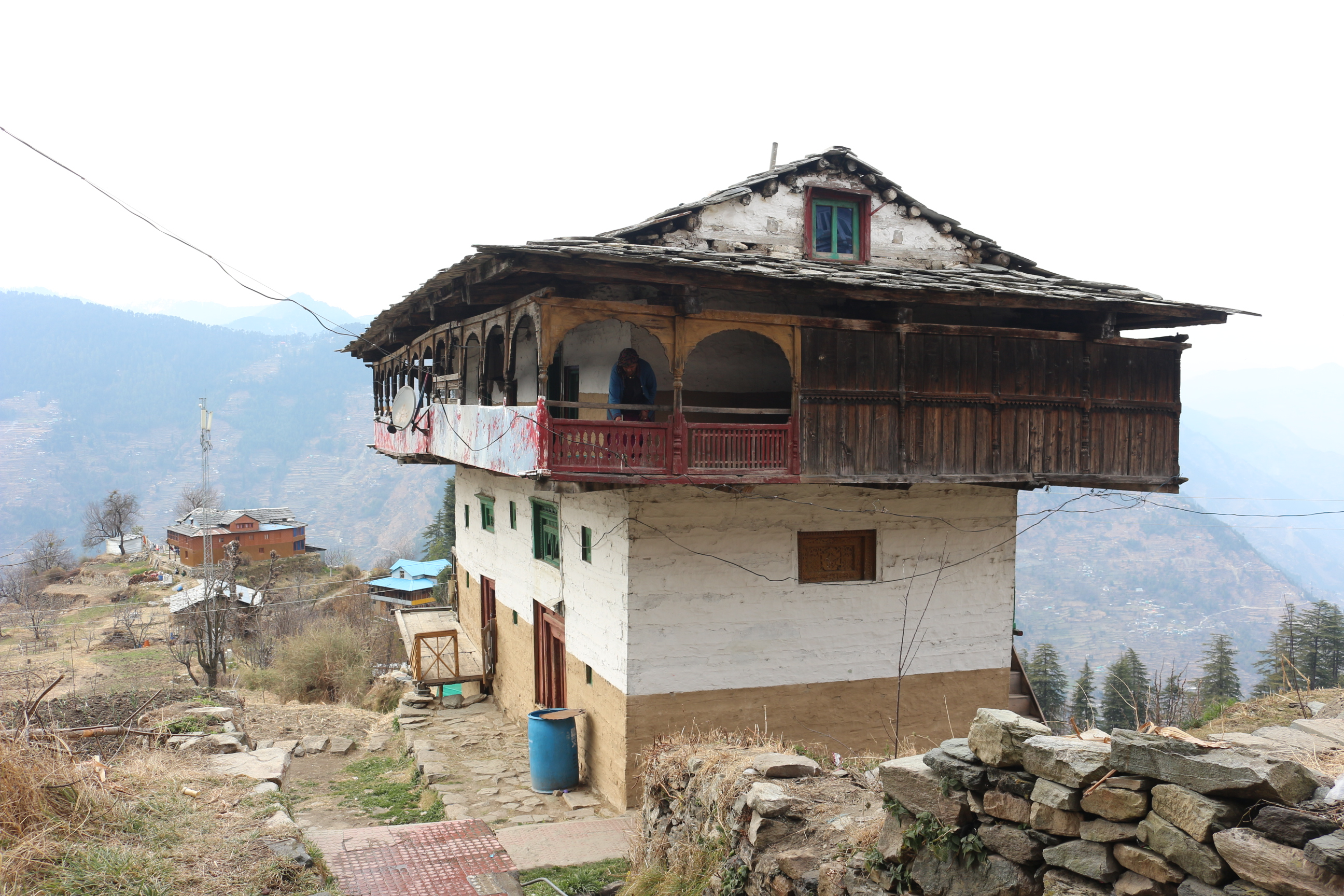
A Traditional Kath Kuni style house near Chehni Kothi

The tower’s superstructure rises steeply from the base. Chehni Kothi’s main temple tower is often described as having nine storeys, around 45 meters. The lower four levels are mostly stone, forming a broad, sturdy base, while the upper five levels are largely wooden. Entry to the tower is via a stone doorway at ground level, and a wooden staircase inside leads up to the shrine chambers. Midway up the tower is a projecting wooden balcony that encircles the building, about 12 metres above ground, providing an intermediate floor and an observation platform. The steep multi-tiered roof of Chehni Kothi is fashioned from locally quarried slate shingles set over wooden rafters. This “pent-and-gable” roof design, with each successive tier smaller than the one below, is characteristic of Himachali temple towers. The overlapping slate not only sheds snow efficiently but also adds weight that holds the wooden beams firmly in place. Typical of Pahari style, the exposed wood elements, beams, brackets, and balcony pillars are often carved with decorative motifs.

Structural surveys have documented visible cracks in the tower’s masonry, likely due to seismic stress and age. A 2023 structural field investigation noted cracks on the Chehni tower walls.

== Cultural and Religious Significance ==
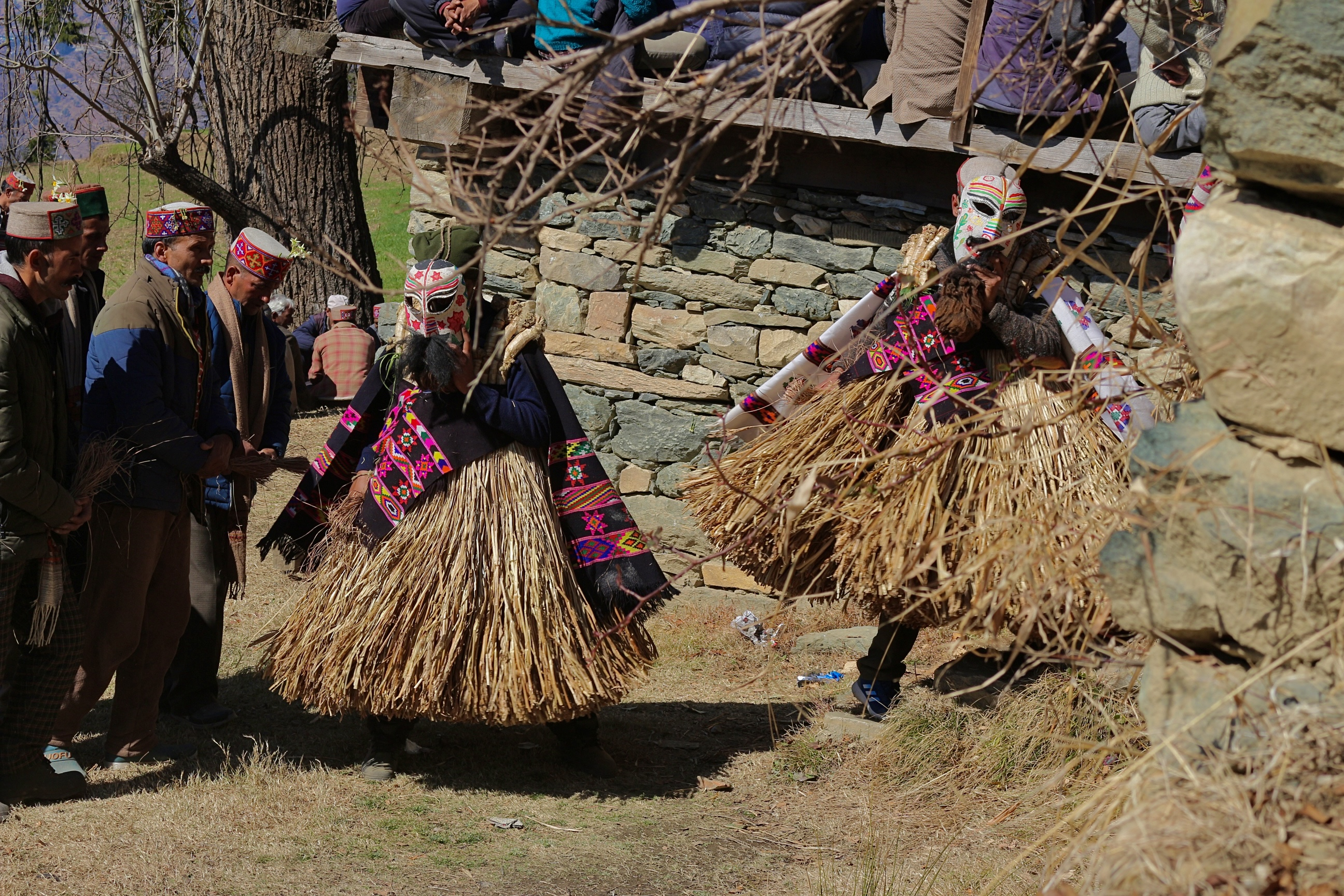
Villagers from Chehni Kothi performing the traditional Fagli dance during local celebration.

Chehni Kothi has long functioned as a temple in addition to being a fort-like edifice. The uppermost chamber of the tower houses an image or images of Hindu deities, and villagers perform worship there on auspicious occasions. Locally the complex is often referred to as the Bhagwati temple, indicating that the principal goddess Bhagwati (a form of the Mother Goddess) is venerated in the tower. (The worship of a Devi in the tower aligns with a broader Himachali tradition of rural goddess cults.) The presence of a temple at the top storey is evidenced by the small sanctum-like niches and idol figures reported in visitor account. Beyond its religious role, Chehni Kothi has gained wider recognition as an emblem of Himachali heritage architecture. Scholars and conservationists cite it as a key example of traditional hillcraft. The tower has been featured in studies of vernacular Himalayan design and is often mentioned in travel literature on Himachal Pradesh’s cultural legacy.
