= Tirthan Wildlife Sanctuary =

Wildlife sanctuary in India

Coordinates: 31°37′10″N 77°32′50″E

- IUCN category IV (habitat/species management area)
- Interactive map of Tirthan Wildlife Sanctuary
- Location: Himachal Pradesh, India
- Area: 61 km^{2} (24 sq mi)
- Established: 1992

Tirthan Wildlife Sanctuary is a wildlife sanctuary in Himachal Pradesh, India. It is situated near the banks of the Tirthan river. It features densely forested areas and hosts a diverse fauna. In 2021, it was ranked the Best Managed Protected Area of India as per the Management Effectiveness Evaluation.

== Location ==
Tirthan Wildlife Sanctuary is situated in the Kullu district of Himachal Pradesh and covers an area of 6,112 ha (61.12 km^{2}).

== Flora and fauna ==
Tirthan Wildlife Sanctuary harbours a variety ‌of ‌forested areas such as oak forest, coniferous forest, deodar forest. Wildlife includes the snow leopard, musk deer, Himalayan brown bear and Kashmir flying squirrel. It also hosts the Himalayan tahr.
