= Kullu shawl =

Type of shawl made in India

A Kullu shawl is a type of shawl made in Kullu, India, featuring various geometrical patterns and bright colors. Originally, indigenous Kulivi people would weave plain shawls, but following the arrival of craftspeople from Bushahr in the early 1940s, the trend of more patterned shawls came to rise.

Typical Kullu shawls have geometrical designs on both ends. The shawls may also have floral designs, which may run all over. Each design may have up to eight colors. Most traditional colors are often bright colors, used to emphasize the shawl and make it more appealing, however, there are instances where the shawl is made with a more dull color, such as pastel. Kulu shawls are also crafted in yak's wool, sheep wool, Pashmina, and other handcrafted material.

== History ==
Prior to national independence, modern and industrialized clothing products did not reach much of the rural parts of the nation. The region in which the Kulivi people inhabit are a temperate region in the Himalayan region, providing an abundance of Sheep, Ox, and various other furred organisms. Prior to the arrival of more modern craftsmen, the primary attire was Patti woven to protect against the harsh cold typical of the region. Following the arrival of a craftsman from Himachal Pradesh, the Kullu Shawl became prominent following the introduction of artistic patterns and floral art, it became a significant article of clothing for most inhabitants of the Himalayan area.
