= Bhrigu Lake =

Lake in Himachal Pradesh, India

Brighu Lake
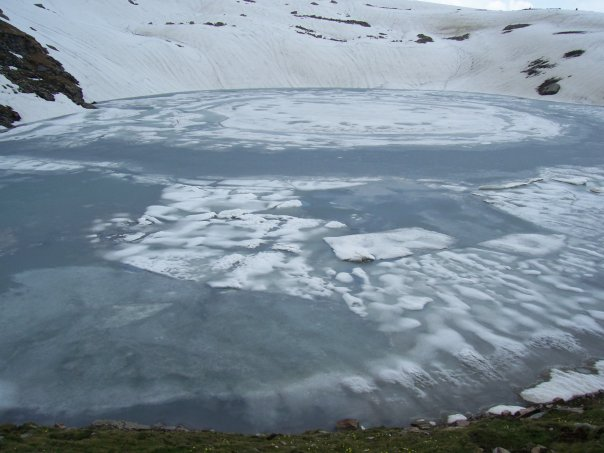
- Brighu Lake in Himachal Pradesh (India) during the months of May-June.

- Location within Himachal Pradesh Location within India
- Location: Kullu, Himachal Pradesh, India
- Coordinates: 32.29342°N 77.24249°E
- Type: High altitude lake
- Primary inflows: Glacier and snow melt
- Primary outflows: None
- Max. length: N/A
- Surface elevation: 4,235 m (13,894 ft)
- Website: hptdc.gov.in

Bhrigu Lake or Brighu Lake is a lake located at an elevation of around 4,300 metres (14,100 ft) in Kullu district, Himachal Pradesh, India. It is located to the east of Rohtang Pass and is around 6 kilometres (3.7 mi) from Gulaba village. It can be reached by trekking either from Vashisht temple, which is famous for its hot water springs, close to the town of Manali, or from Gulaba, on the way to Rohtang Pass. It is named after Maharshi Bhrigu.

Legend has it that the sage used to meditate near the lake and hence it has been rendered sacred. It lies on the various trek routes of the region.

== Gallery ==
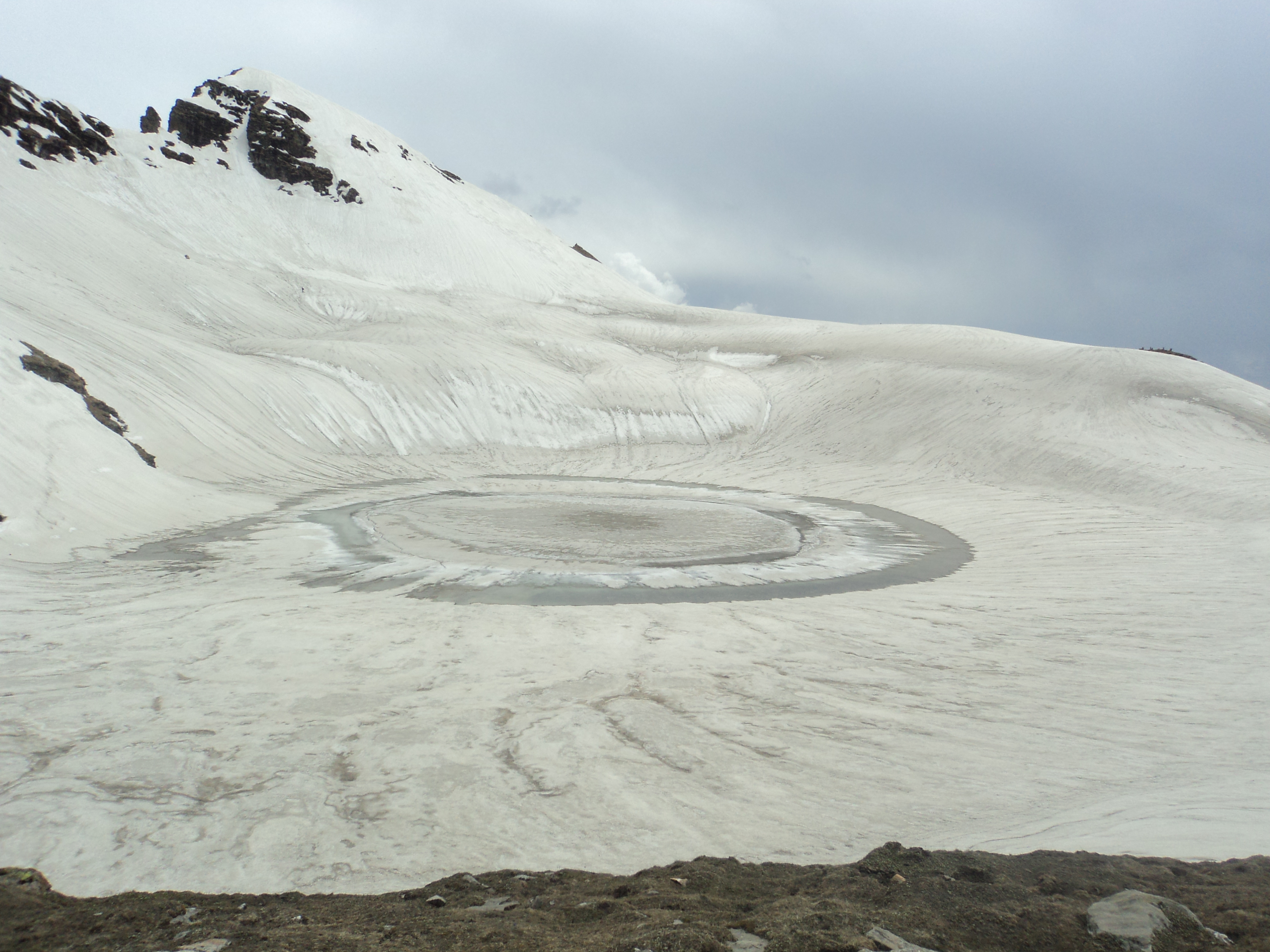
Bhrigu lake situated at approx. 14,200 ft (4,300 m) near Rohtang Pass

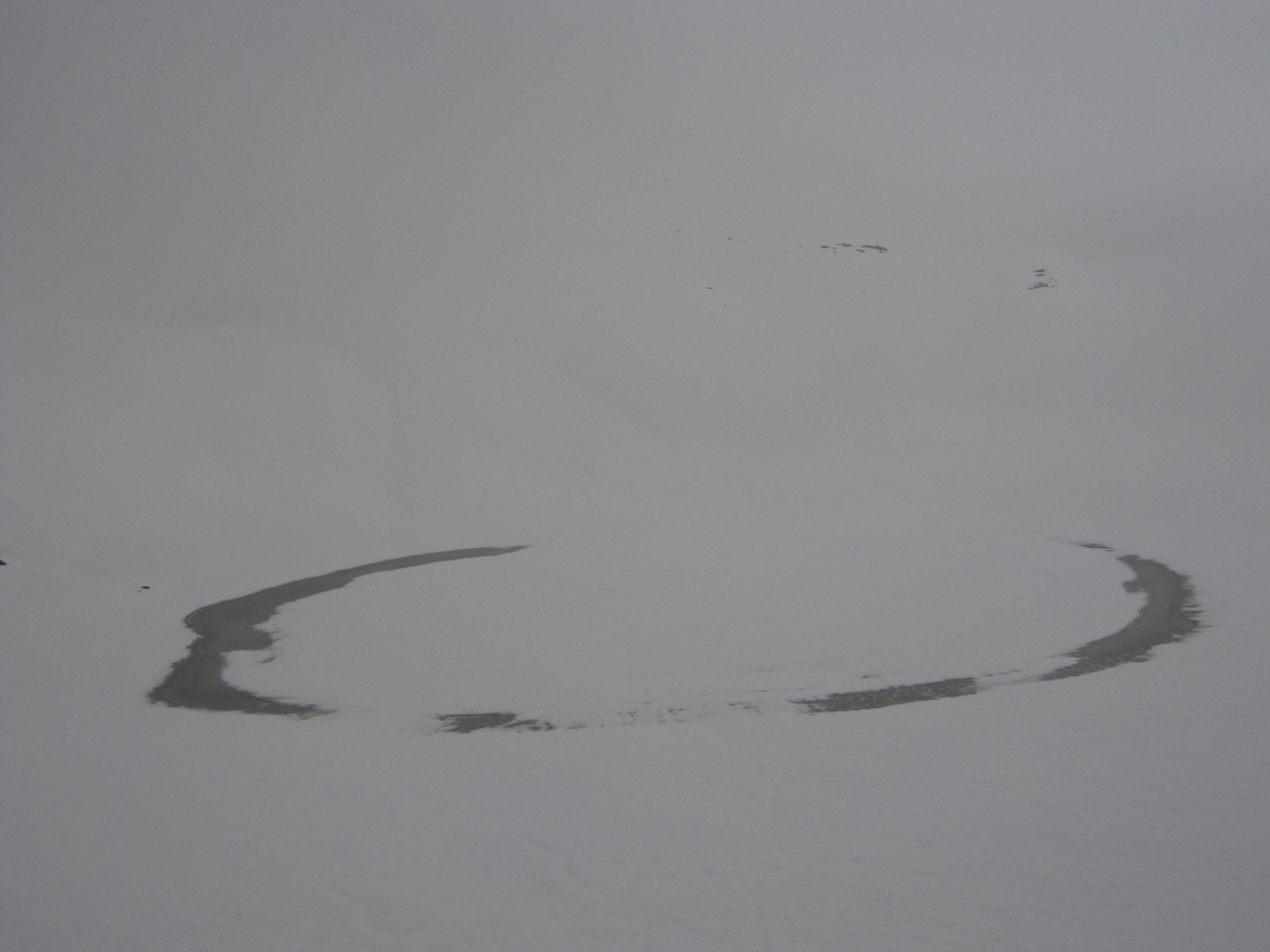
Frozen Brighu lake

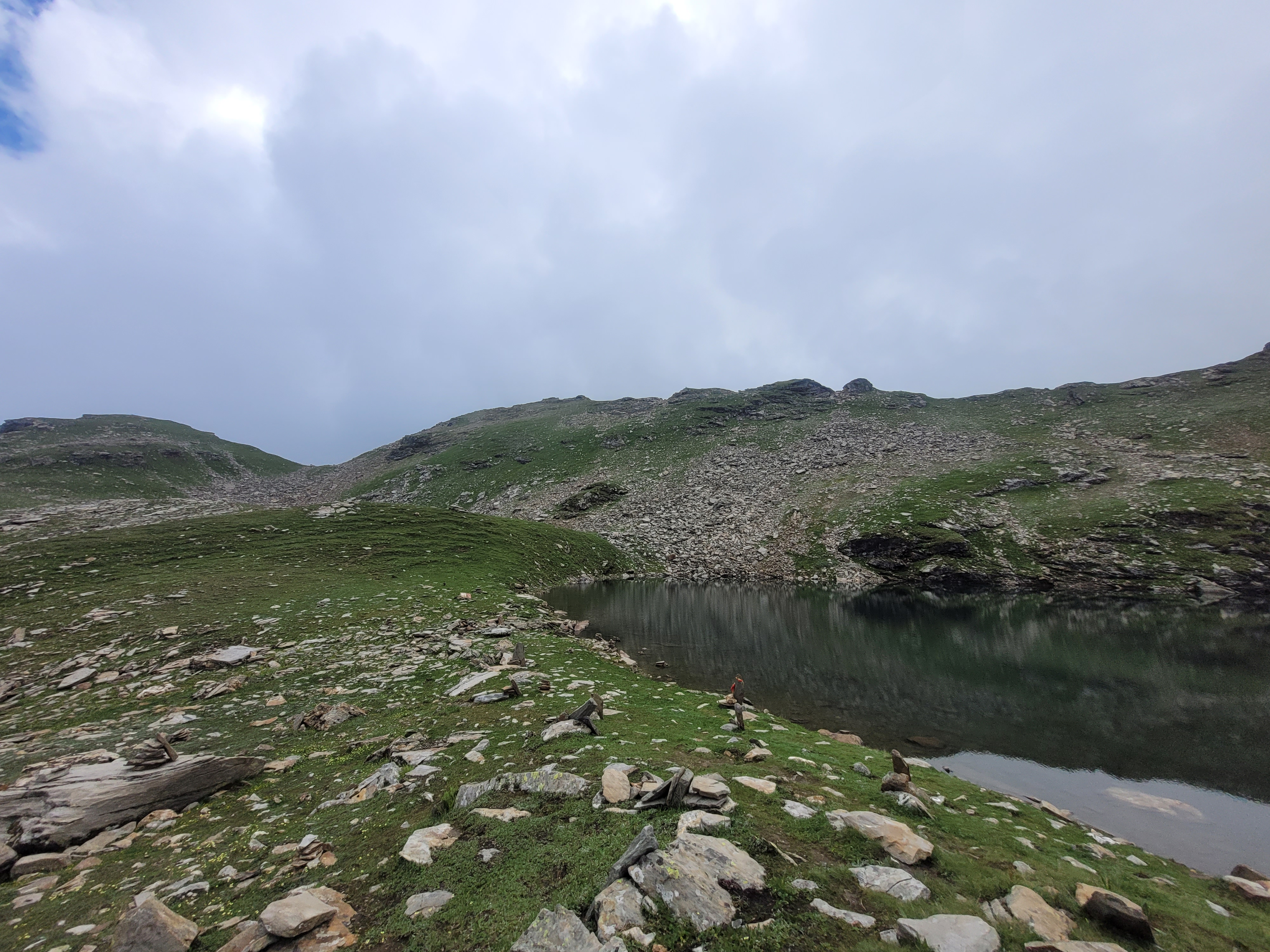
Bhrigu Lake without snow

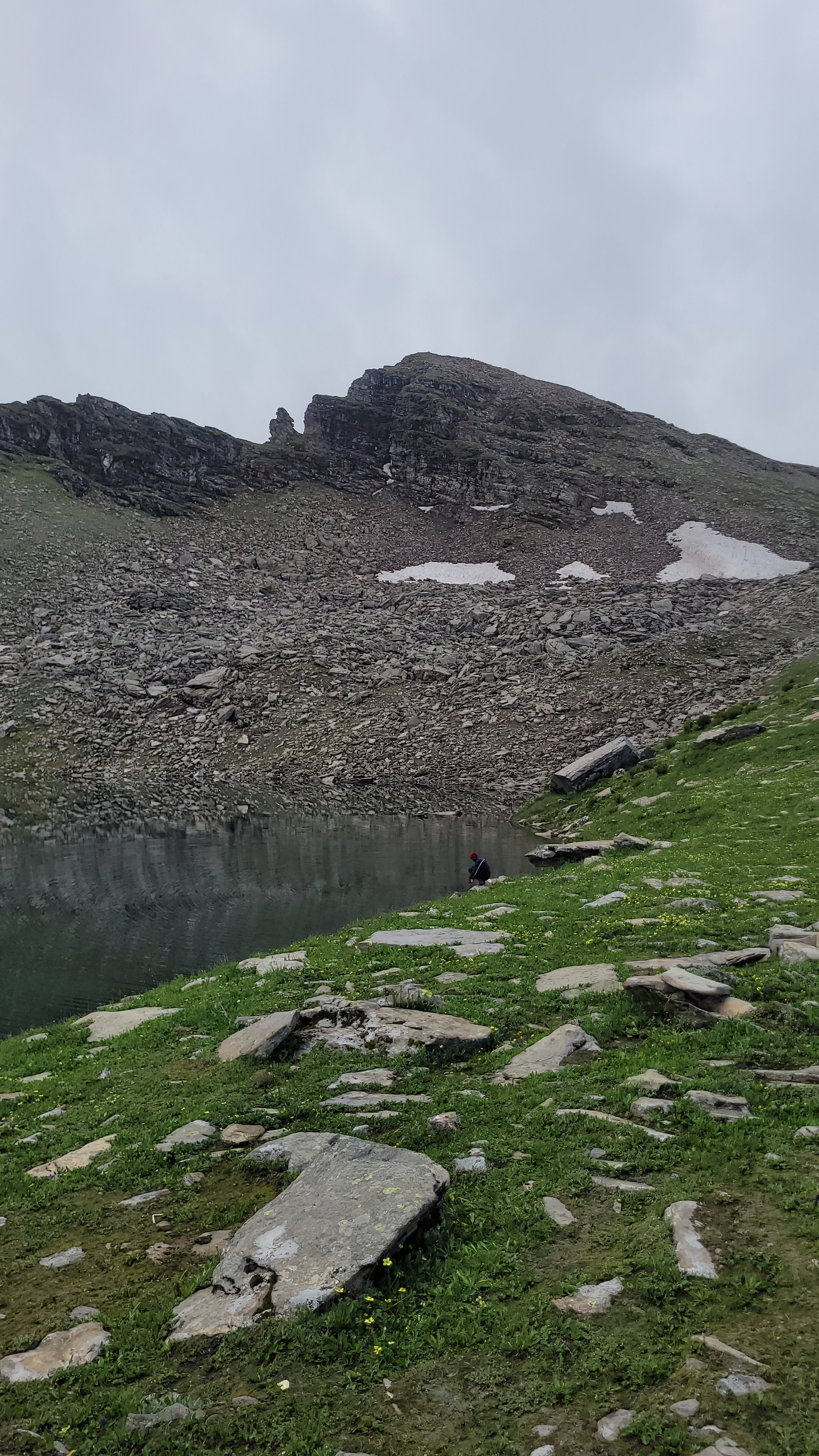
A person sitting on the lake edge

== See also ==
- Kullu district
