= Mall Road, Manali =

Main street in Manali, city of Himachal Pradesh, India

Mall Road is the main street in Manali, city of Himachal Pradesh, India. The offices of municipal corporation, fire service, and police headquarters are located here. Automobiles, except emergency vehicles are not allowed on this road.

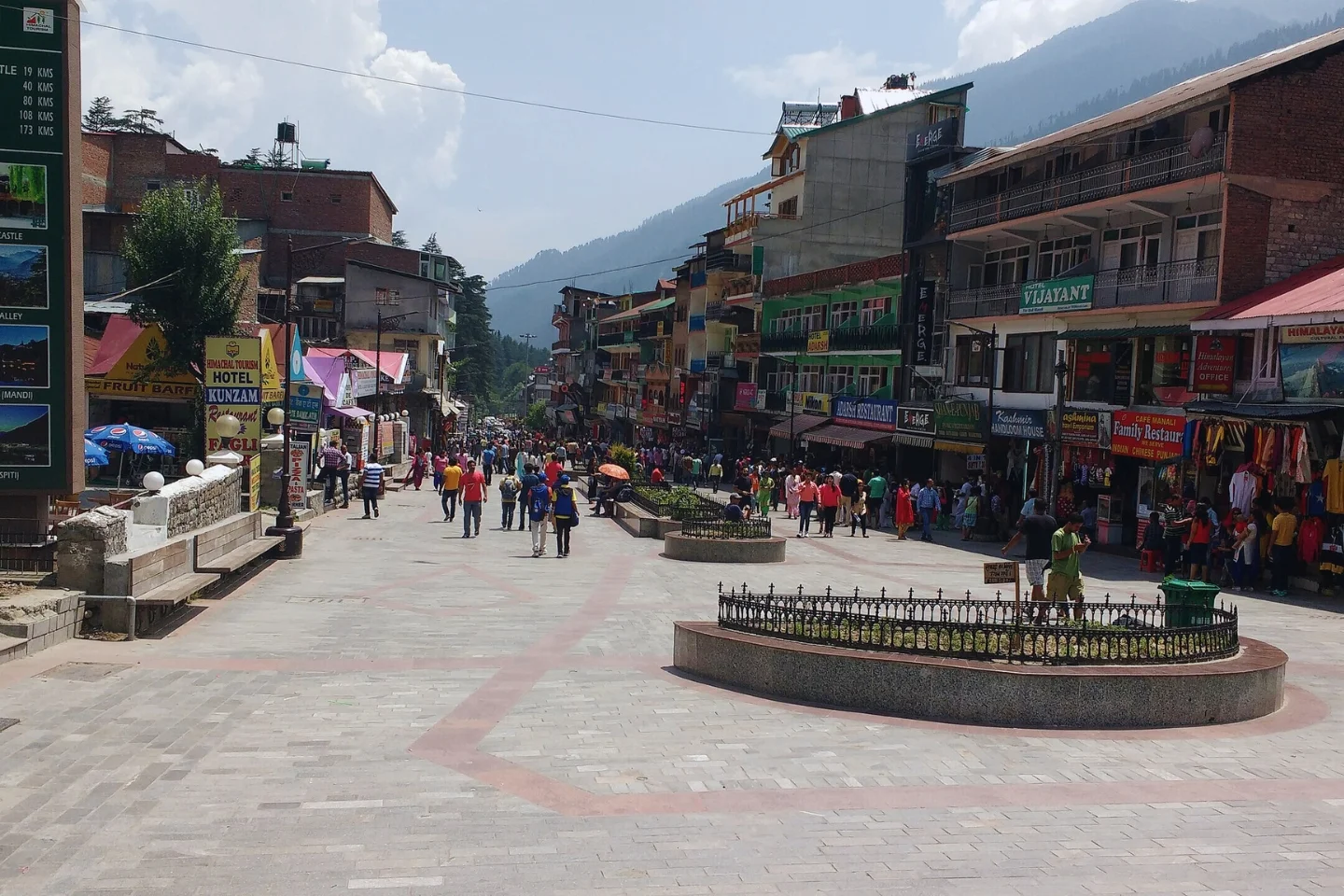
Manali Mall Road

Mall Road has a number of showrooms, department stores, shops, restaurants and cafes. A Himachal emporium that offers handicraft products of Himachal Pradesh like locally designed woolen clothes, branded clothes, pottery items, wooden products, and jewellery is also located here.

== Transport ==
=== Road ===
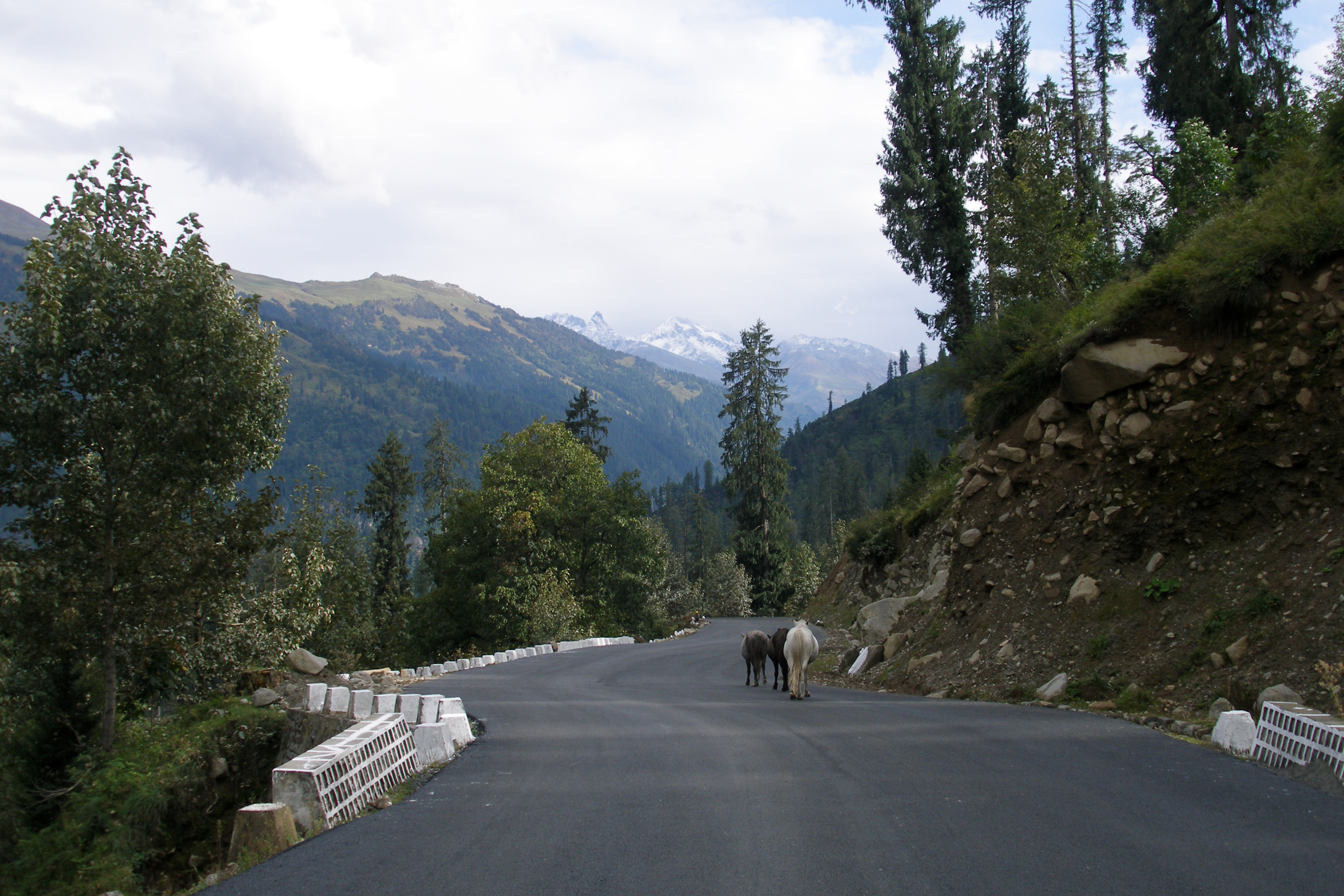
Road near Manali in Himachal Pradesh

Manali can be reached from Delhi by national highway NH 1 up to Ambala and from there NH 22 to Chandigarh and from there by national highway NH21 that passes through Bilaspur, Sundernagar, Mandi and Kullu towns. The road distance from Chandigarh to Manali is 282 km (175 mi), and the total distance from Delhi to Manali is 550 km (340 mi). Bus services are available from HRTC (Himachal Road Transport Corporation), HPTDC (Himachal Tourism Development Corporation), and private operators.

=== Air ===
The nearest airport Kullu–Manali Airport (IATA code KUU) is at Bhuntar town in Kullu. The airport is also known as Kullu-Manali airport and has more than a kilometer-long runway. Air India has regular flights to the airport from New Delhi.

==== Helicopter Service ====
Pawan Hans, the Government charter agency, provides helicopter-taxi service connecting Shimla to Chandigarh, Kullu, Kangra and Dharamshala.

=== Rail ===
Bilaspur will be a station on the under-construction Bhanupli–Leh line. There is no close railhead available close to Manali. The nearest broad gauge railheads are at Una 250 km (155 mi) away, Kiratpur Sahib 268 km (167 mi), Kalka (275 km (171 mi)), Chandigarh (310 km (193 mi)), and Pathankot (325 km (202 mi)). The nearest narrow gauge railhead is at Joginder Nagar (147 kilometres (91 mi)). The Kalka–Shimla Railway is a nostalgic narrow-gauge route culminating at the state capital to travel by road to Manali.

== See also ==
- Tourism in Himachal Pradesh
- List of hill stations in India
- Hadimba Temple
- Mall Road, Manali
- Rohtang Pass, Manali
- Baralacha La Pass
- Solang Valley
- Atal Tunnel

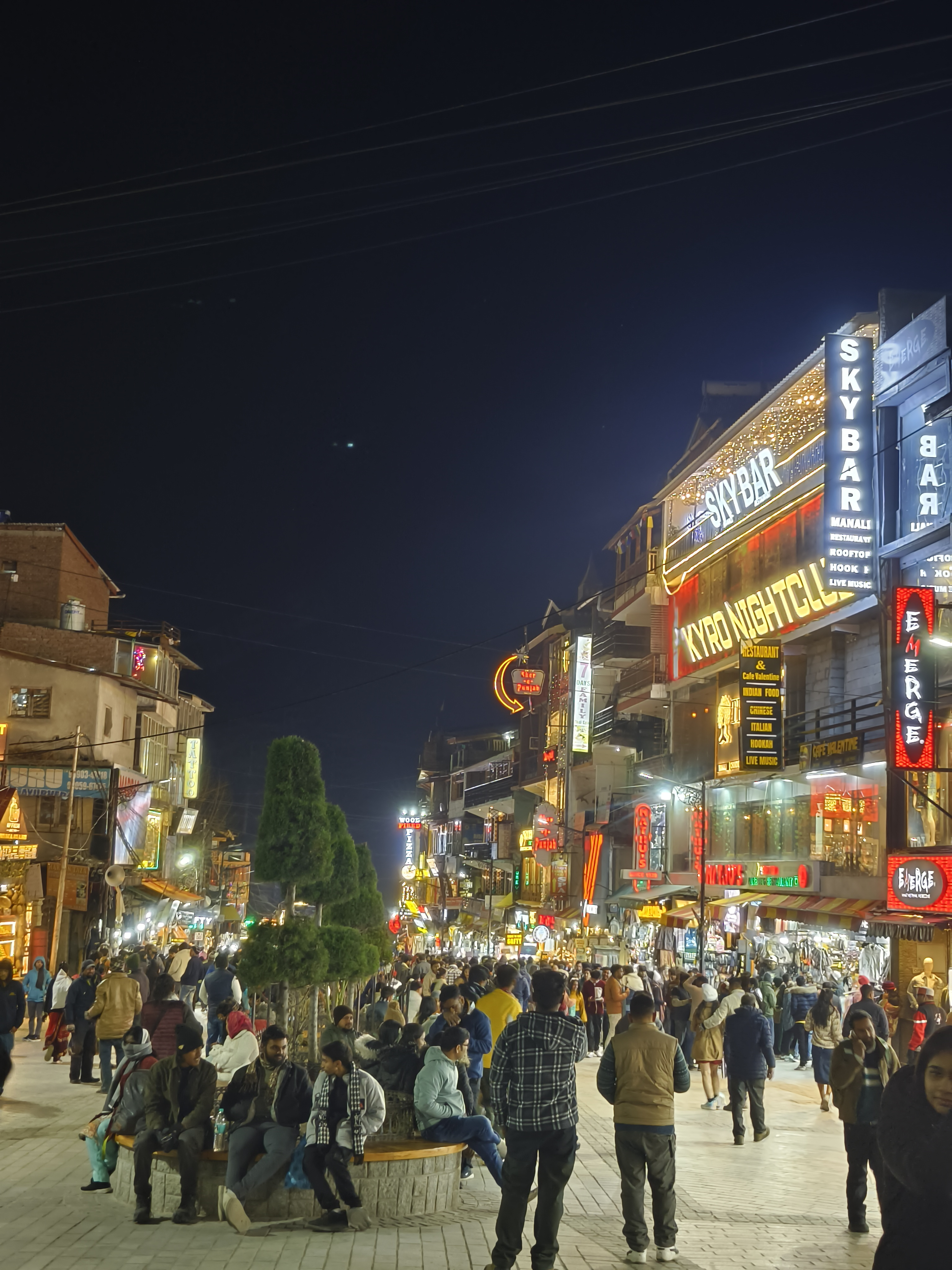
Mall Road View in Night

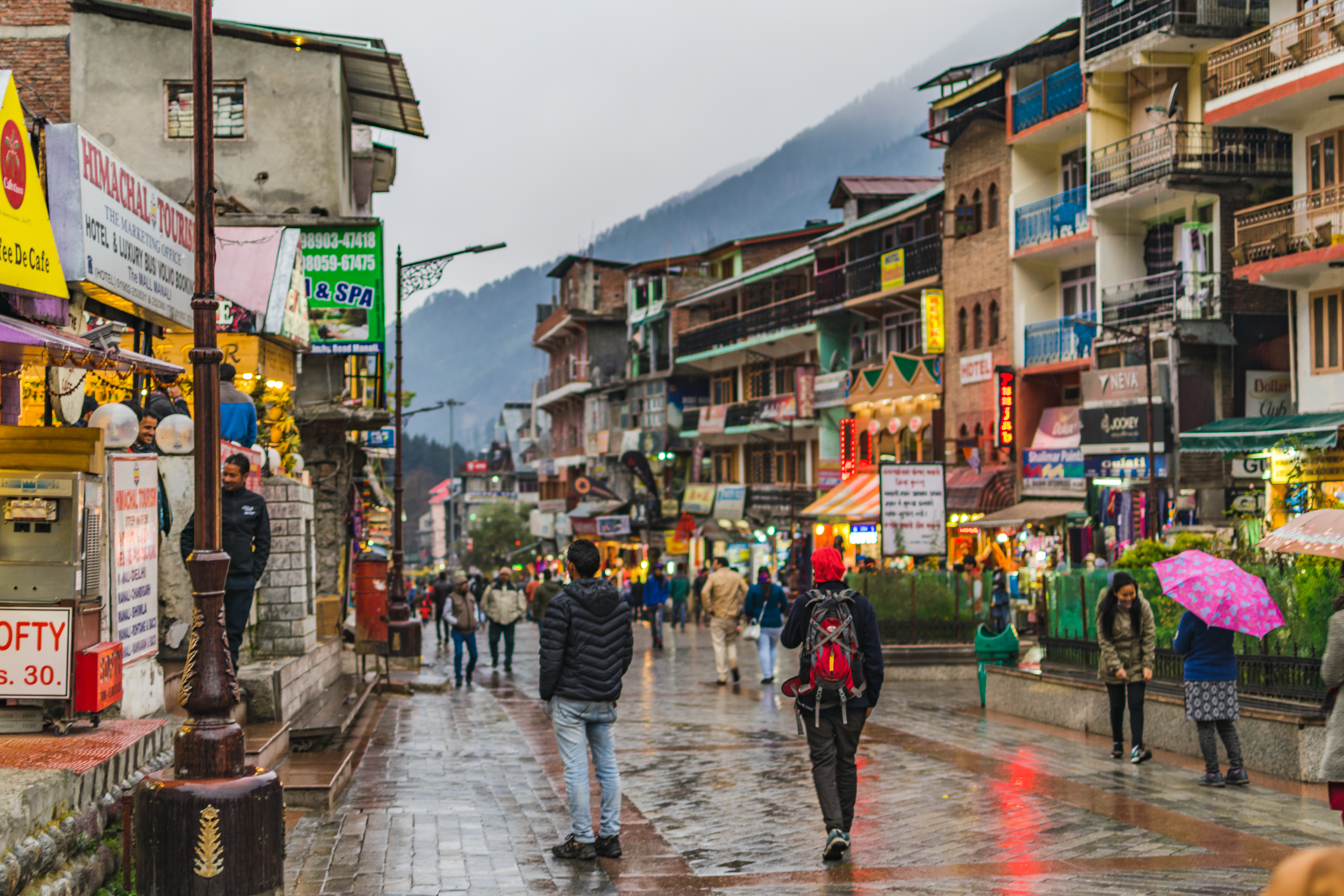
Mall road at evening in Manali
