= Marhi =

- locality
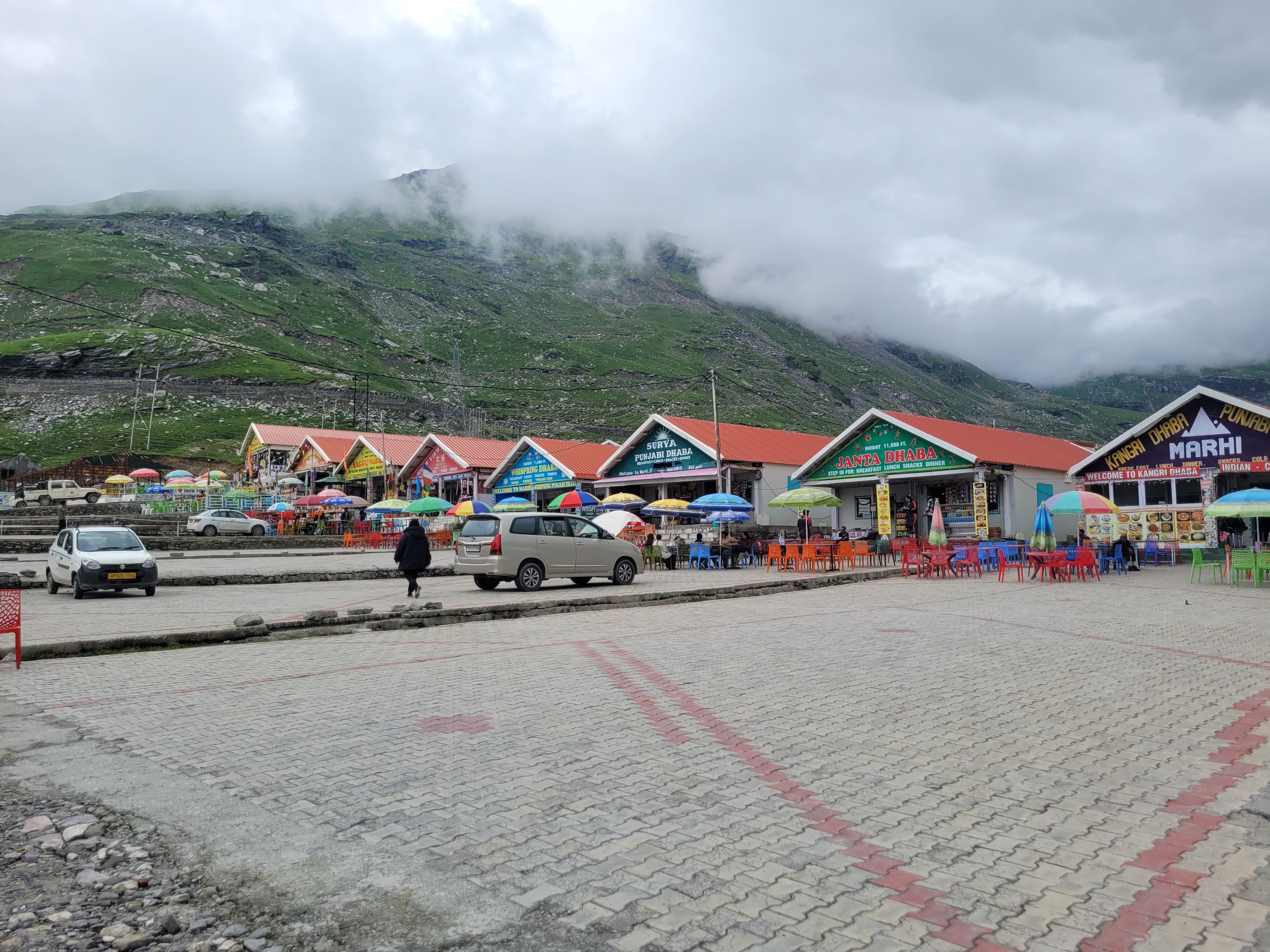

- Location in Himachal Pradesh, India Marhi (India)
- Coordinates: 32.348996°N 77.217858°E
- Country: India
- State: Himachal Pradesh
- Elevation: 3,360 m (11,020 ft)

Languages
  - Official: Hindi
- Time zone: UTC+5:30 (IST)

Marhi is a "shanty town of roadside restaurants" in Himachal Pradesh, India, located midway between Manali and Rohtang La on the Manali-Leh Highway. Buses traveling the highway often stop in Marhi so passengers can eat. The settlement is seasonal, with most businesses closing for the winter.

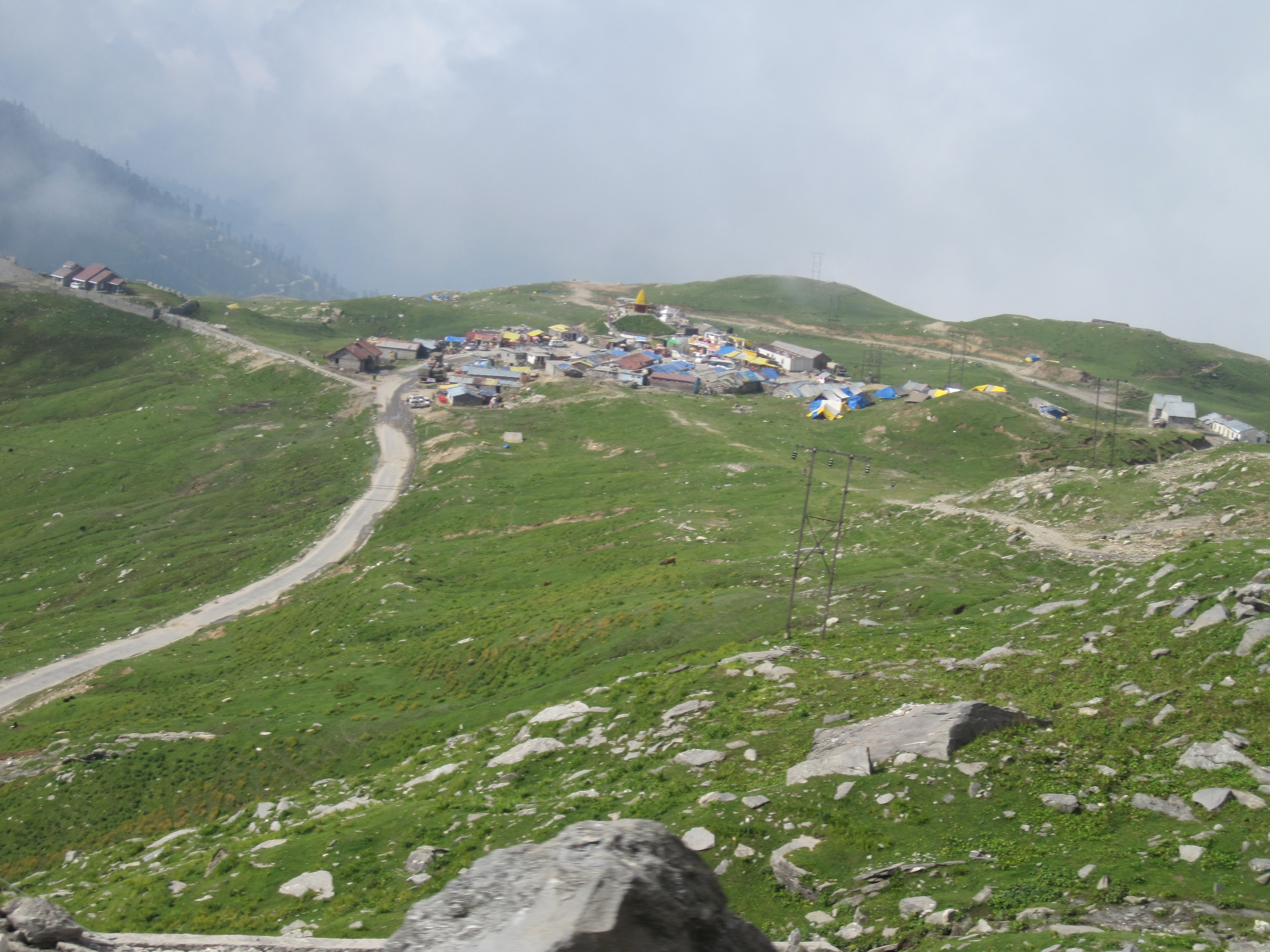
View of Marhi from above

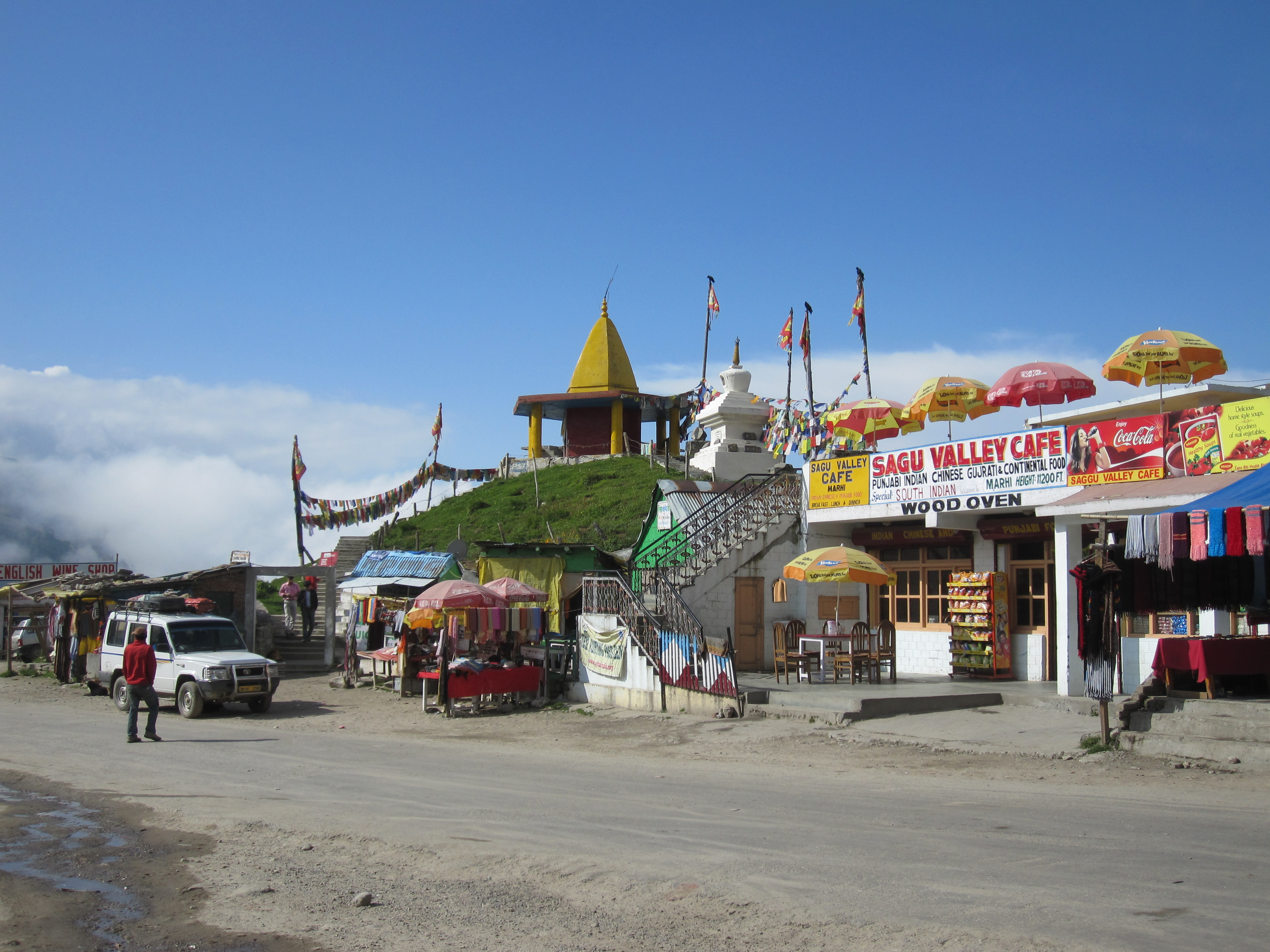
Gompa at Marhi
