= Gulaba =

- Interactive map of Gulaba
- Traversed by: Leh-Manali Highway

Third Approach
- Location: India
- Range: Pir Panjal, Himalayas
- Coordinates: 32.323°N 77.201°E

Gulaba is a village in the Indian State of Himachal Pradesh. It is located 27 km from the town of Manali and 25 km from the Rohtang pass. The village was designed and is managed according to the guidelines of National Green Tribunal Act. It has focused much of its resources on promoting tourism. To reduce the environmental impacts of tourism, the village has improved sanitation services, possessing multiple mobile toilet units and a waste disposal system. As per the order of National Green Tribunal Act, only 800 petrol vehicles and 400 diesel vehicles are given permits to visit Rohtang Pass.

The road leading to Rohtang Pass is barred during heavy snowfall season which lasts from November to March. To avoid accidents, Himachal Pradesh Police has set up barriers to guide traffic.
