= Manali, Himachal Pradesh =

Town in India

Manali
- Town
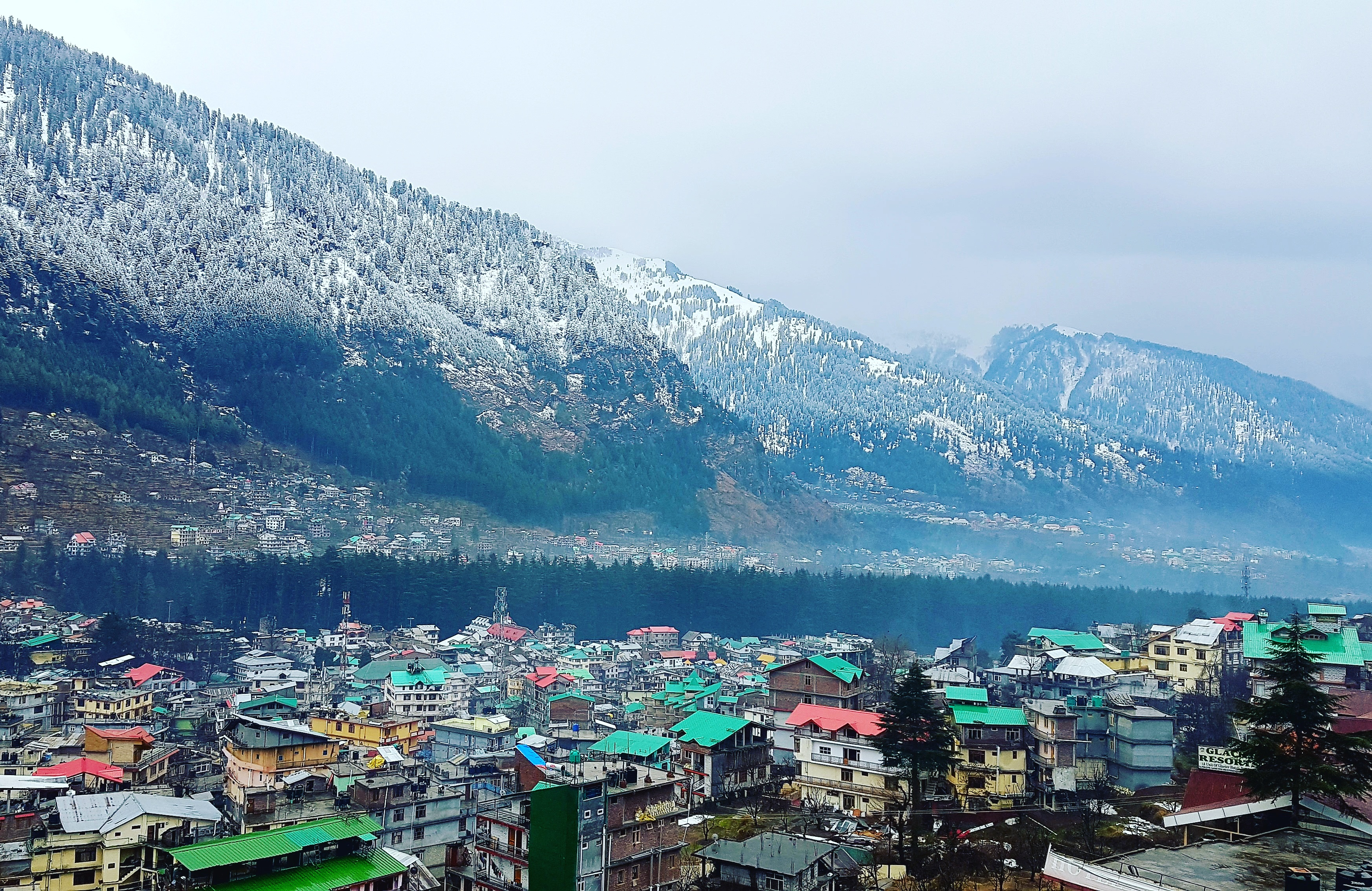
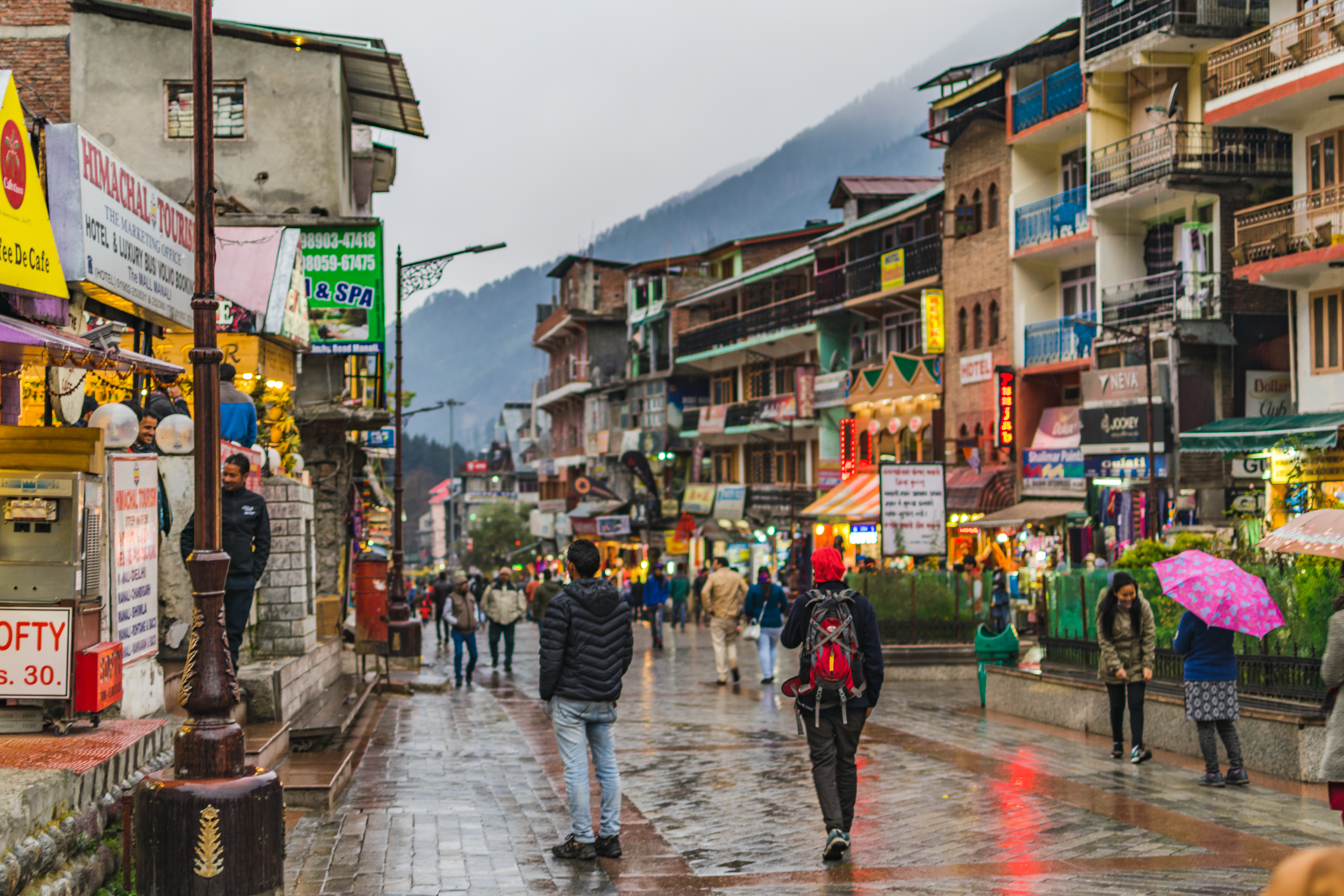
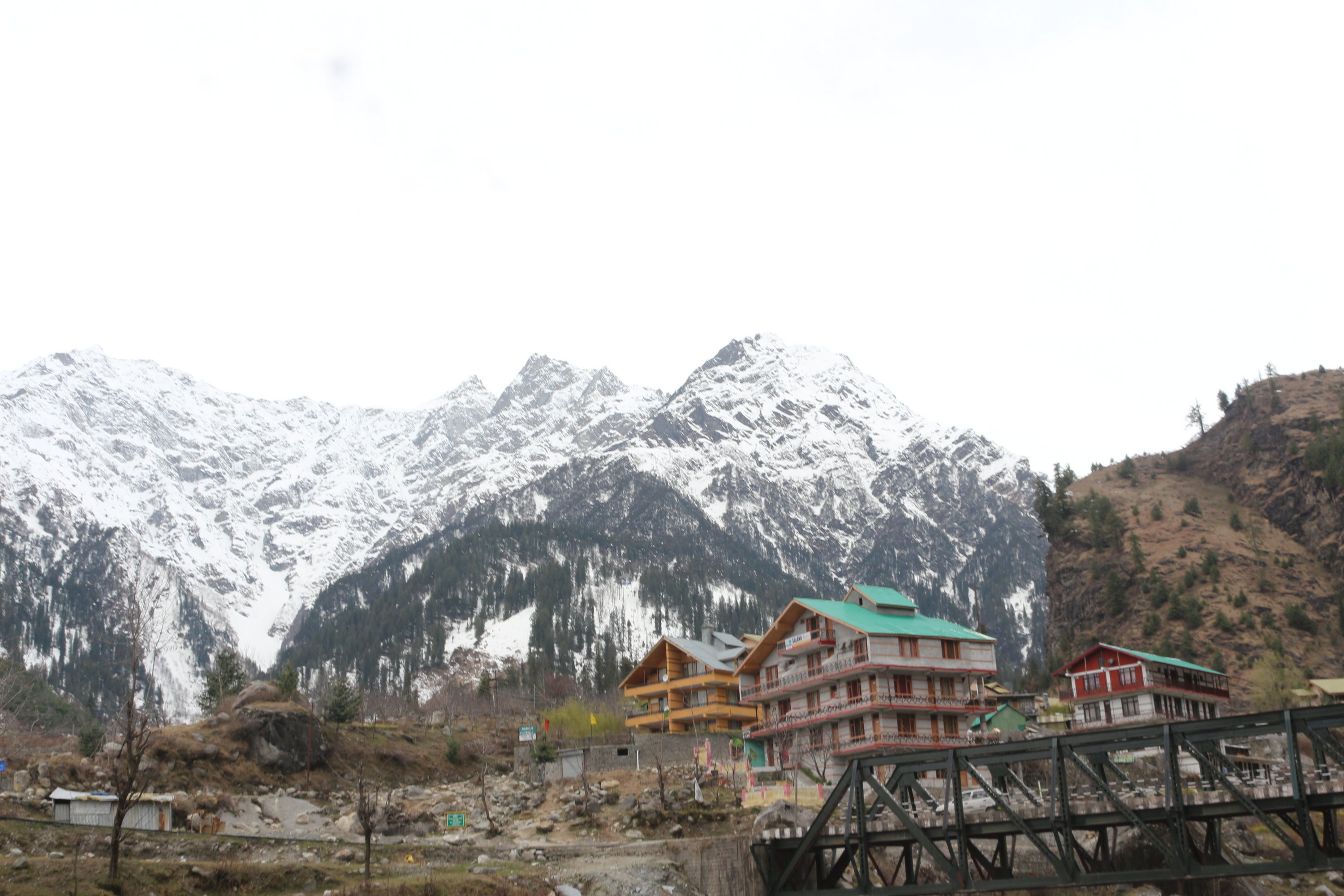
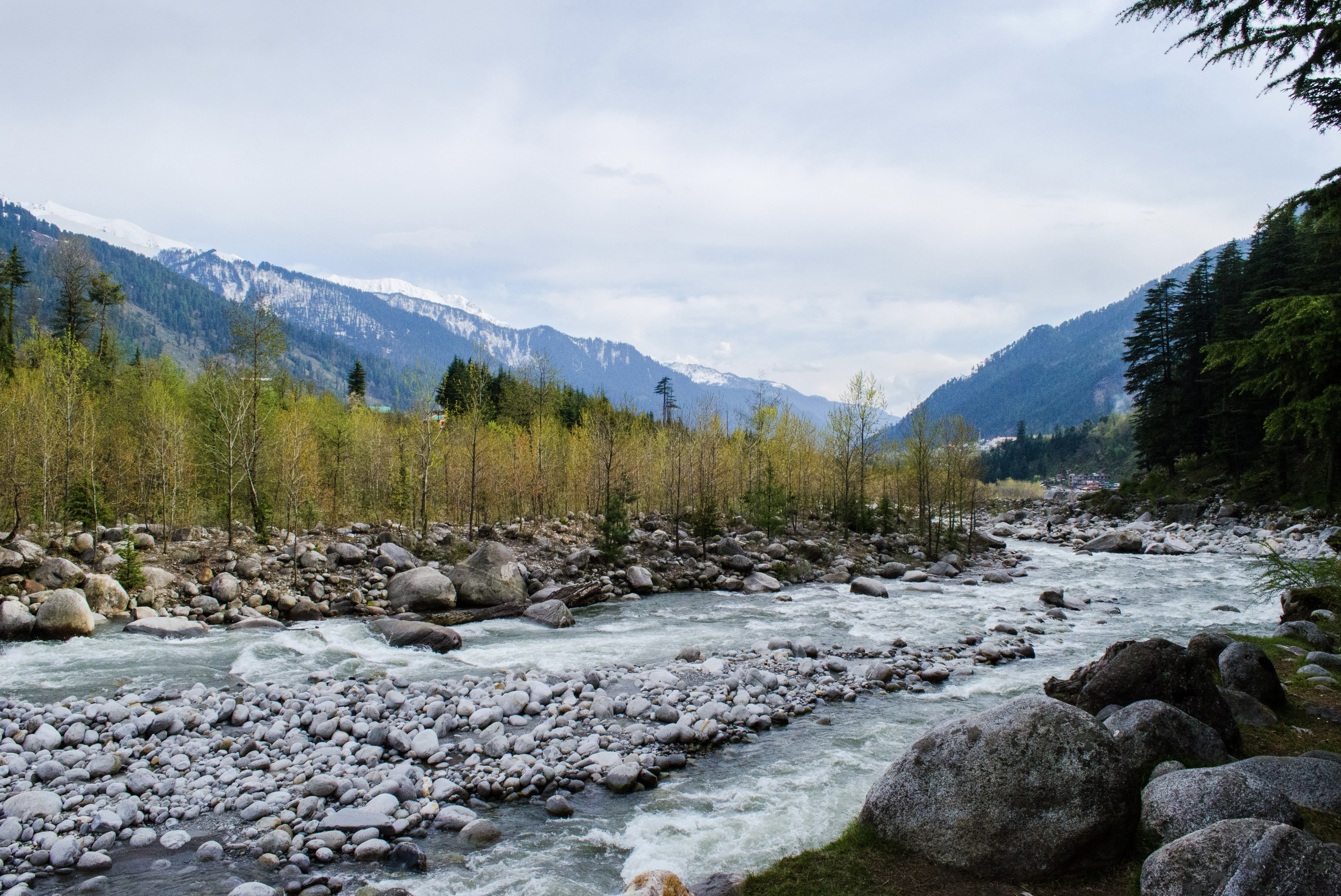
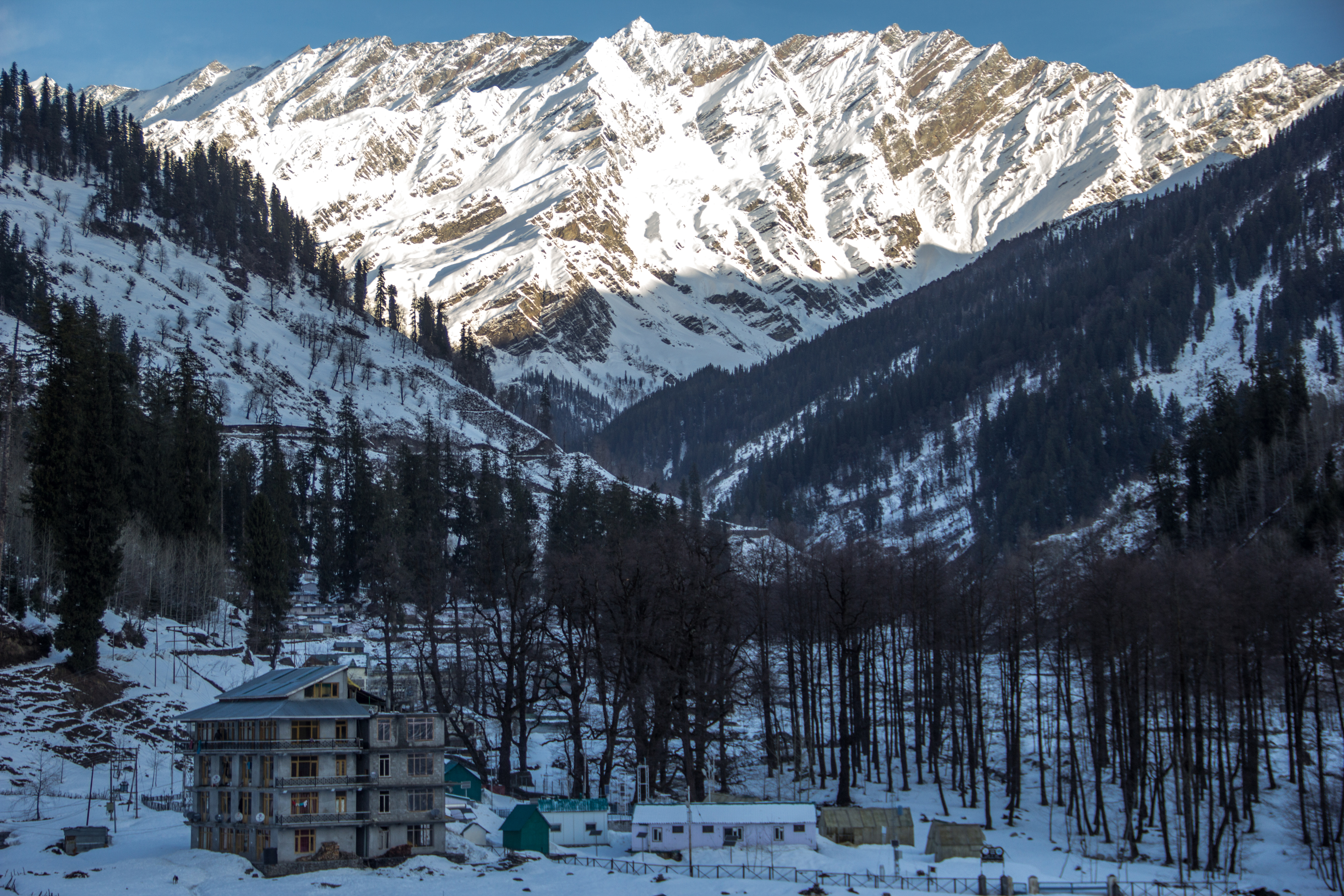
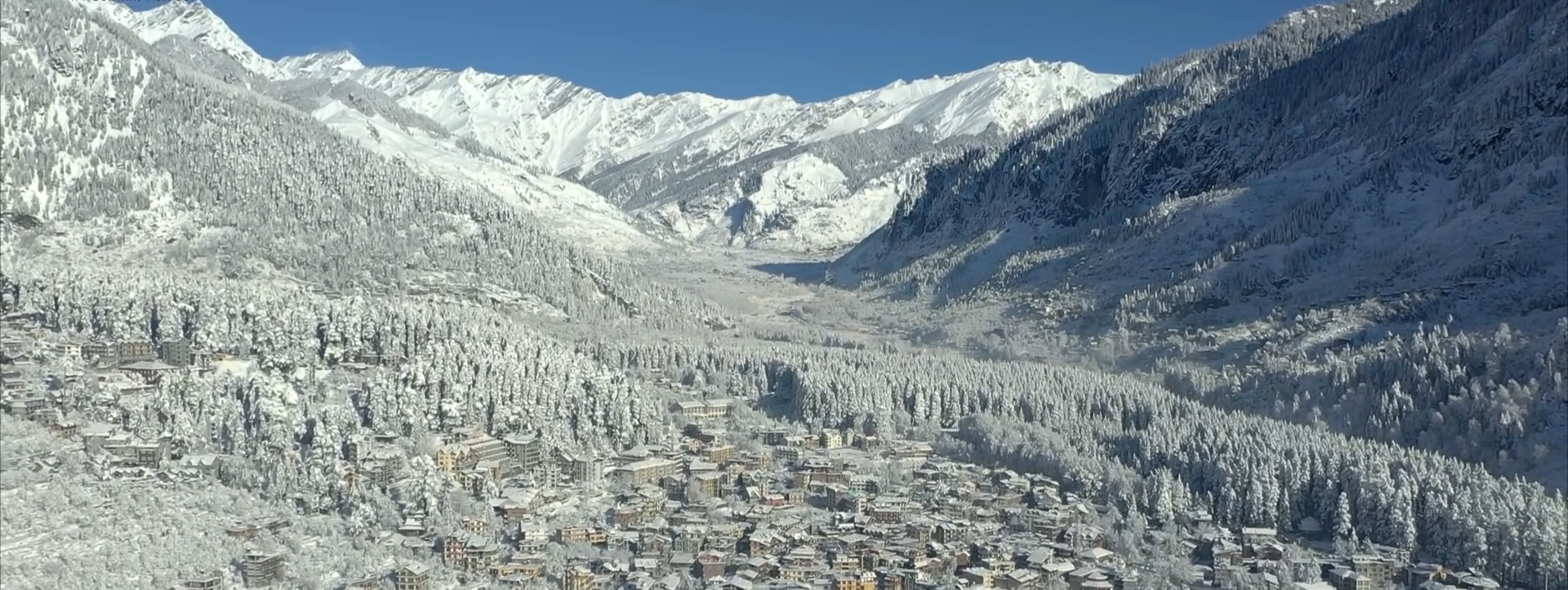
- Clockwise from top: Manali aerial view, Dhauladhar view, Mountains in Manali, Manali after snowfall, River in Manali, Mall road

- Location within Himachal Pradesh Location within India
- Coordinates: 32.243177°N 77.189246°E
- Country: India
- State: Himachal Pradesh
- District: Kullu
- Named for: Manu
- Elevation: 2,050 m (6,730 ft)

Population (2011)
  - Total: 8,096
  - Rank: 22 (state)

Languages
  - Official: Hindi
  - Regional: Kullui
- Time zone: UTC+5:30 (IST)
- PIN: 175131
- Telephone code: +911902
- Vehicle registration: HP-58

Manali (Hindi: manālī, pronounced [mənaːliː]) is a resort town, near Kullu town in the Kullu district in the Indian state of Himachal Pradesh. It is situated at the northern end of the Kullu Valley, formed by the Beas River. The town is located in the Kullu district, approximately 270 kilometres (170 mi) north of the state capital of Shimla and 544 kilometres (338 mi) northeast of the national capital of New Delhi. Manali is a popular tourist destination in India and serves as the gateway to the Lahaul and Spiti district as well as the city of Leh in Ladakh.

Manali is the beginning of an ancient trade route through Lahaul (H.P.) and Ladakh, over the Karakoram Pass and onto Yarkand and Hotan in the Tarim Basin of China. As per the 2011 Census of India, the Manali Municipal Council had a population of 8,096, comprising 4,717 males and 3,379 females. Updated estimates suggest the town’s population is approximately 11,700 as of 2025.

== Mythology ==
Manali is named after Manu, the progenitor of humanity in Hinduism. The name Manali is regarded as the derivative of Manu-Alaya (transl. 'the abode of Manu'). In Hindu cosmology, Manu is believed to have stepped off his ark in Manali to recreate human life after a great flood had deluged the world at the end of an cyclic age. The Kullu Valley where Manali is situated is often referred to as the "Valley of the Gods". An old village in the town has an ancient temple dedicated to the sage Manu.

== History ==
Manali’s history blends ancient mythological traditions with trade, medieval temple heritage, and modern tourism development. The town’s name derives from Sanskrit Manu-Alaya (“abode of Manu”), reflecting a local legend that Sage Manu resettled humanity here after a great flood. In medieval times, the region was part of the broader Kullu principality and saw the construction of enduring temples such as the 16th-century Hidimba Devi Temple. Under British rule in the 19th and early 20th centuries, Manali began to emerge as a hill retreat, with infrastructure and orchard cultivation introduced by colonial visitors. After Indian independence, Manali’s growth accelerated as a tourist destination, facilitated by improved road links and leisure amenities.

Captain A. Banon and J.S. Mackay were the early apple orchardists in Manali.

== Governance ==
Manali’s urban local governance evolved from a Notified Area in the early 1960s to formal municipal administration under state law. After implementation of the Himachal Pradesh Municipal Act, 1994, Manali was constituted as a Nagar Panchayat in 1994 as the town’s population and built-up area expanded. With further socio-economic growth and expansion of urban infrastructure, it was upgraded to a Municipal Council in 2009, and is officially listed among the Municipal Councils of Himachal Pradesh. The Municipal Council, Manali functions under the Directorate of Urban Development, Govt. of Himachal Pradesh, and is responsible for urban planning, land regulation, roads, sanitation and waste management, water supply, public amenities, and local development. The administrative headquarters of the council is located near Nehru Park in Manali.

== Geography ==
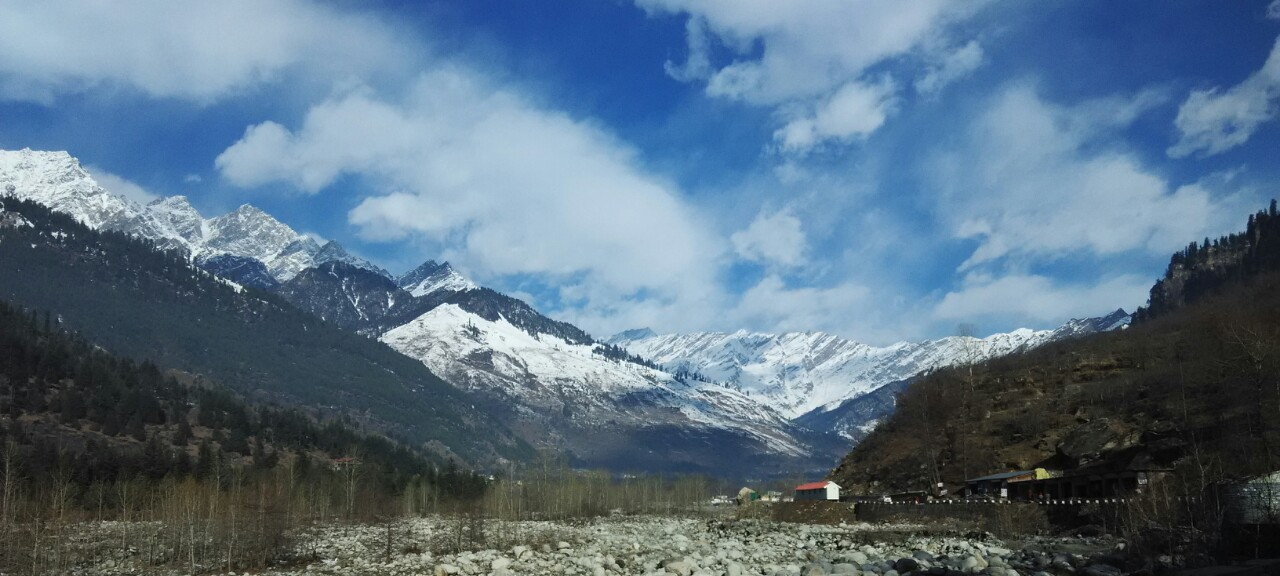
Himalayan mountains in Manali, Himachal Pradesh.

Manali is located at 32.2396 N, 77.1887 E, about 547 km (340 mi) north of New Delhi.

=== Climate ===
Manali

Climate chart (precipitation, max. and min. temperature)
J	F	M	A	M	J	J	A	S	O	N	D
90 11 −1	114 12 0	155 17 3	88 21 6	66 25 9	90 26 13	202 26 16	217 25 16	123 24 12	25 22 6	31 17 3	39 14 0
- █ Average max. and min. temperatures in °C
- █ Precipitation totals in mm
Imperial conversion
J	F	M	A	M	J	J	A	S	O	N	D
3.5 51 30	4.5 54 33	6.1 63 38	3.5 71 44	2.6 77 49	3.5 80 55	7.9 78 61	8.5 78 61	4.9 76 54	1 71 43	1.2 63 37	1.5 56 33
- █ Average max. and min. temperatures in °F
- █ Precipitation totals in inches

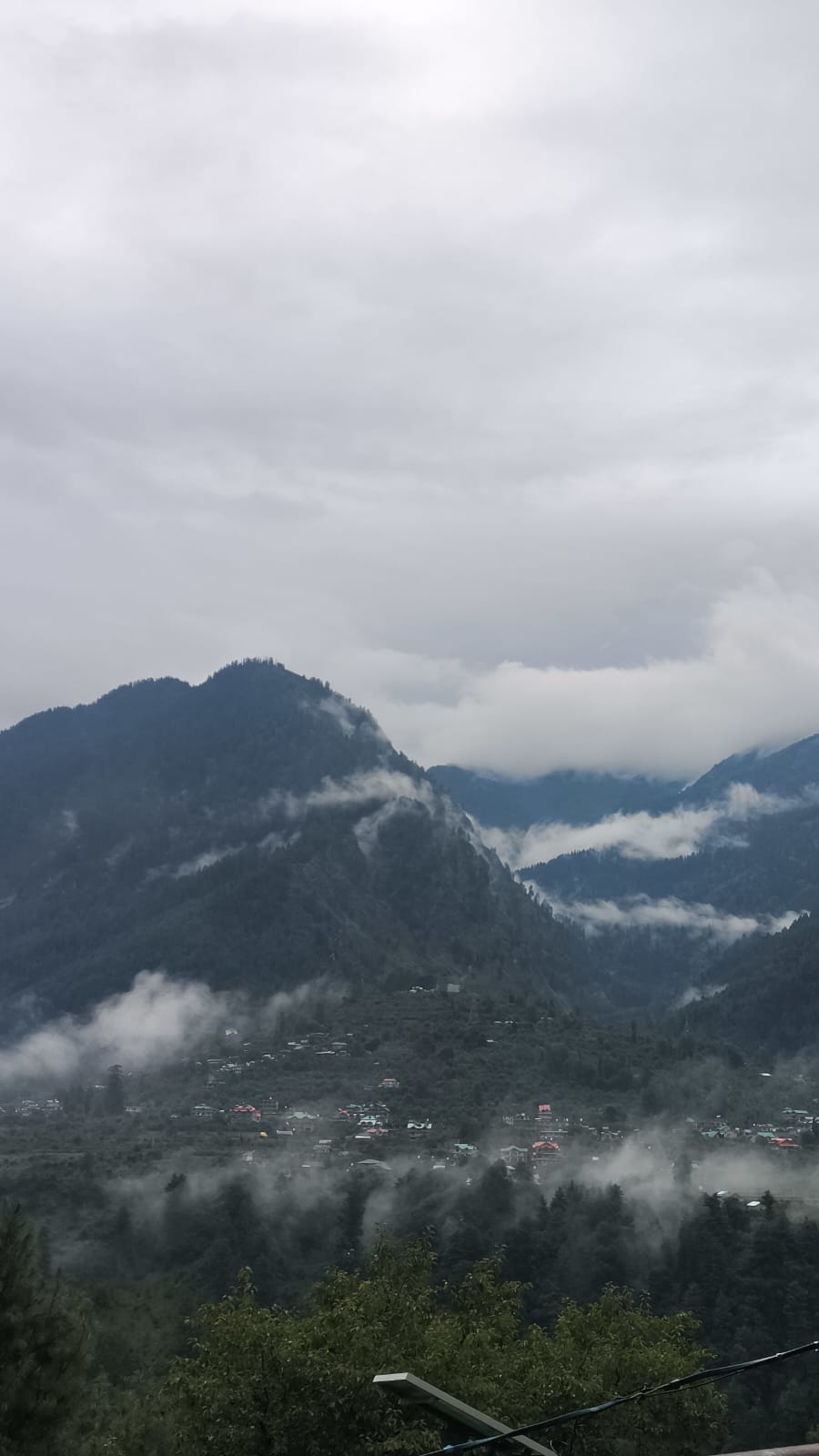
Manali in 2025

Manali features NO subtropical highland climate (Cfb) with warm summers, relatively cold winters, and a high diurnal temperature variation. The temperatures range from −7 °C (19 °F) to 30 °C (86 °F) over the year with the hottest day crossing 30 °C (86 °F) and the coldest day going below −7 °C (19 °F). The average temperature during summer is between 10 °C (50 °F) to , and between −7 °C (19 °F) to 15 °C (59 °F) in the winter.

Monthly precipitation varies between 31 mm (1.2 in) in November and 217 mm (8.5 in) in August. On average, some 45 mm (1.8 in) of precipitation is received during winter and spring months, increasing to some 115 mm (4.5 in) in summer as the monsoon approaches. The average total annual precipitation is 1,363 mm (53.7 in). Manali experiences snowfall predominantly between December and the beginning of March.

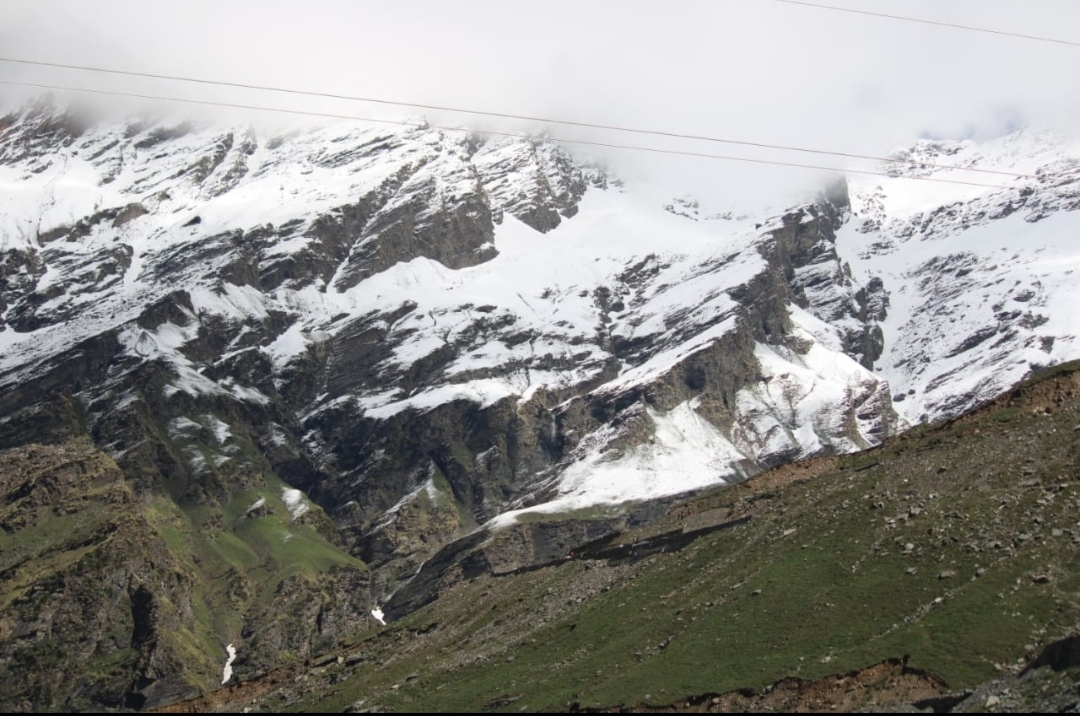
Manali in May 2022

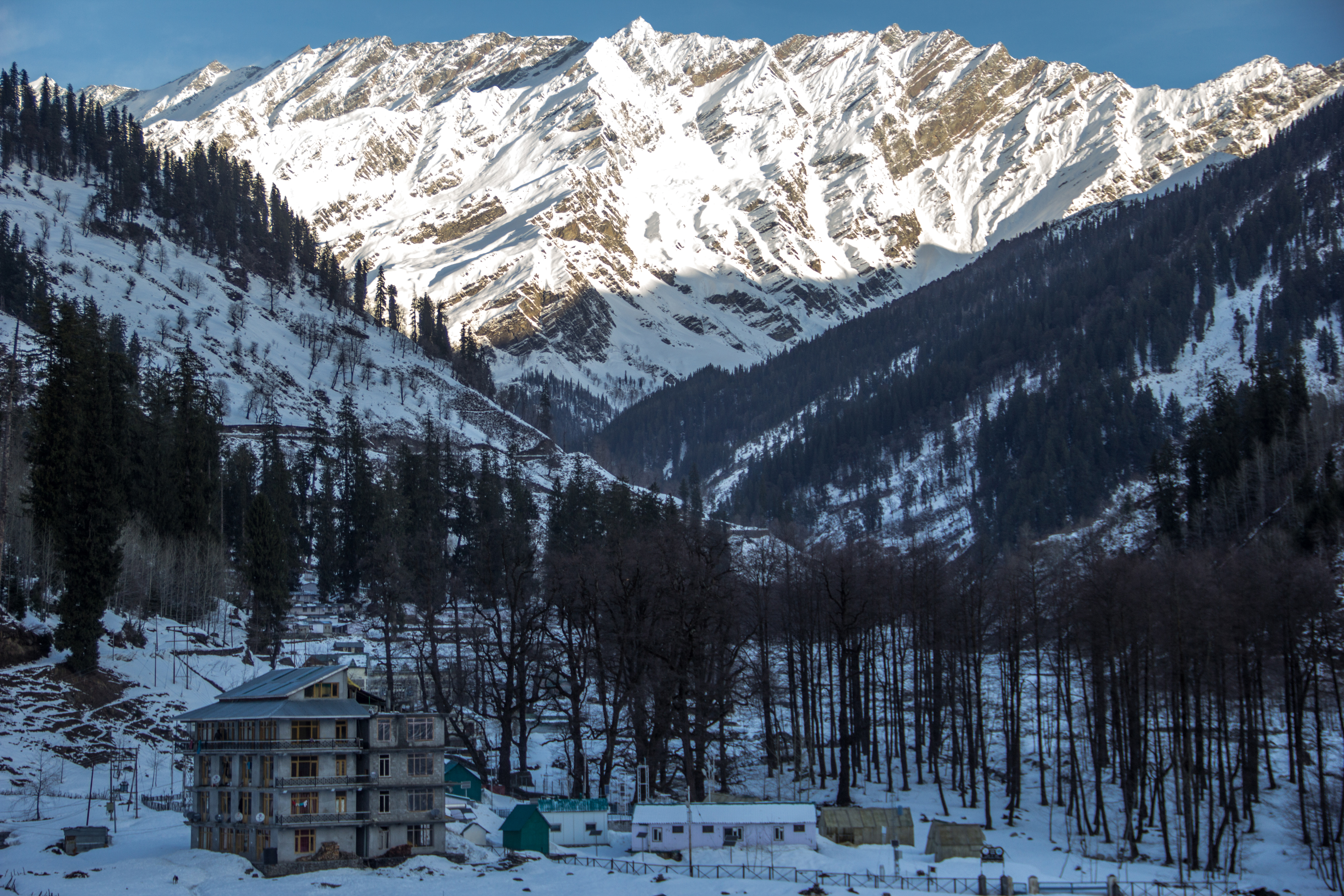
Snowfall in Manali

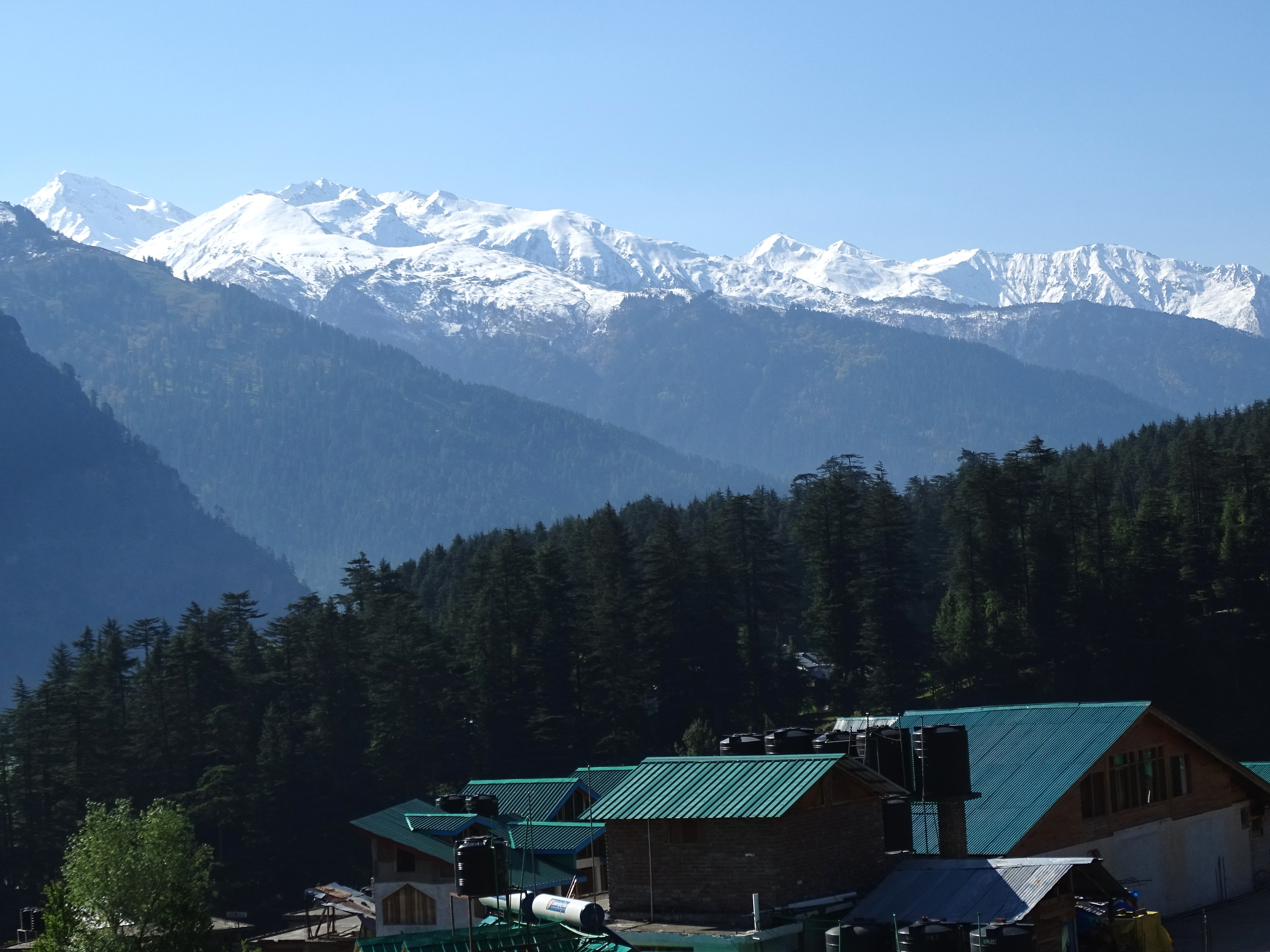
View of Himalayas from Manali

Climate data for Manali, Himachal Pradesh (1991–2020, extremes 1968–2020)
Month	Jan	Feb	Mar	Apr	May	Jun	Jul	Aug	Sep	Oct	Nov	Dec	Year
Record high °C (°F)	19.5 (67.1)	23.5 (74.3)	27.0 (80.6)	30.0 (86.0)	35.0 (95.0)	33.2 (91.8)	32.6 (90.7)	30.6 (87.1)	29.2 (84.6)	30.0 (86.0)	25.6 (78.1)	21.5 (70.7)	35.0 (95.0)
Mean daily maximum °C (°F)	10.5 (50.9)	12.0 (53.6)	17.1 (62.8)	21.4 (70.5)	24.9 (76.8)	26.4 (79.5)	25.7 (78.3)	25.3 (77.5)	24.2 (75.6)	21.6 (70.9)	17.3 (63.1)	13.5 (56.3)	20.2 (68.4)
Mean daily minimum °C (°F)	−1.1 (30.0)	0.3 (32.5)	3.3 (37.9)	6.4 (43.5)	9.3 (48.7)	13.0 (55.4)	16.0 (60.8)	16.1 (61.0)	12.2 (54.0)	6.3 (43.3)	2.6 (36.7)	0.3 (32.5)	7.2 (45.0)
Record low °C (°F)	−11.6 (11.1)	−11.0 (12.2)	−6.0 (21.2)	−1.0 (30.2)	1.0 (33.8)	4.4 (39.9)	7.4 (45.3)	7.0 (44.6)	3.0 (37.4)	−1.5 (29.3)	−5.0 (23.0)	−10.0 (14.0)	−11.6 (11.1)
Average rainfall mm (inches)	90.0 (3.54)	113.7 (4.48)	154.9 (6.10)	87.7 (3.45)	66.4 (2.61)	89.9 (3.54)	201.5 (7.93)	217.0 (8.54)	123.4 (4.86)	24.8 (0.98)	31.3 (1.23)	38.7 (1.52)	1,239.3 (48.79)
Average rainy days	5.6	6.7	8.4	6.0	6.2	7.9	12.9	14.9	8.1	1.9	1.8	2.2	82.6
Average relative humidity (%) (at 17:30 IST)	62	60	52	58	63	66	75	76	76	69	63	62	65
Source: India Meteorological Department

== Demographics ==
Manali has grown from a trading village to a small town. As of the 2011 census of India, its population was 8,096. In 2001, Manali had an official population of 6,265. Males constituted 64% of the population and females 36%. Manali had an average literacy rate of 74%, male literacy was 80%, and female literacy was 63.9%. 9.5% of the population was under six years of age.

== Transport ==
=== Road ===
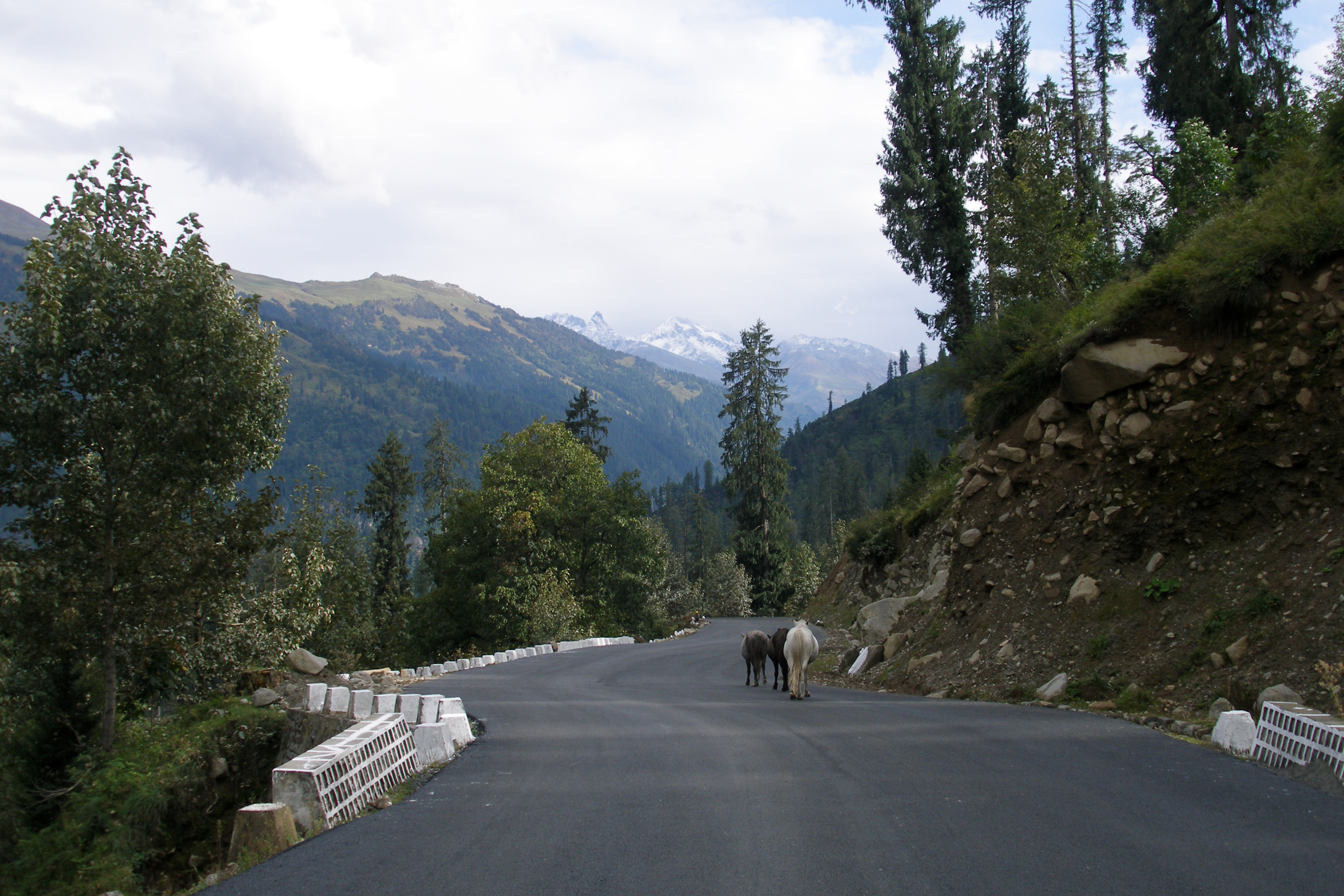
Road near Manali in Himachal Pradesh

Manali can be reached from Delhi by national highway NH 1 up to Ambala and from there NH 22 to Chandigarh and from there by national highway NH21 that passes through Bilaspur, Sundernagar, Mandi and Kullu towns. The road distance from Chandigarh to Manali is 282 km (175 mi), and the total distance from Delhi to Manali is 550 km (340 mi). Bus services are available from HRTC (Himachal Road Transport Corporation), HPTDC (Himachal Tourism Development Corporation), and private operators.

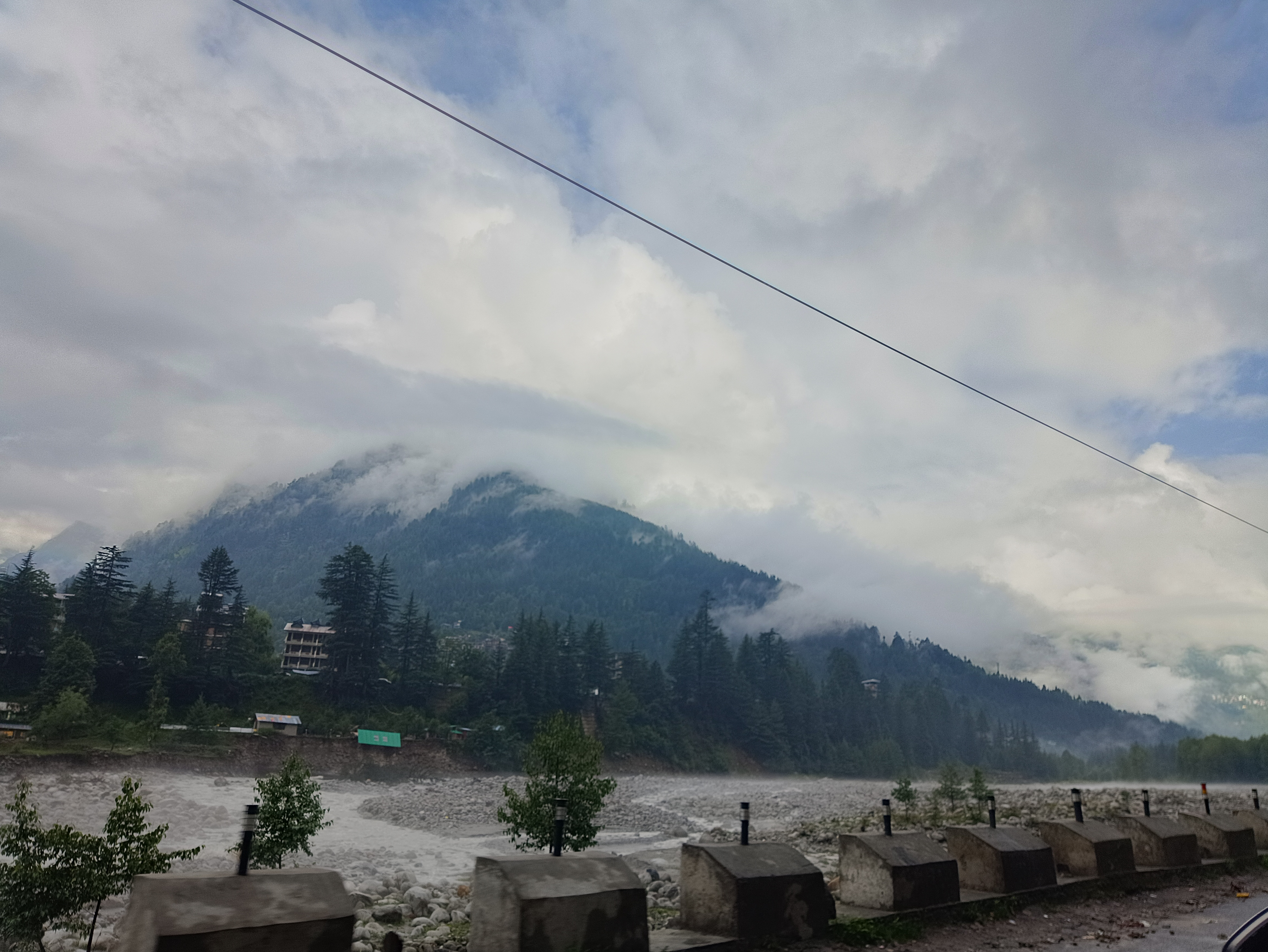
Beas river in Manali

=== Air ===
The nearest airport Kullu–Manali Airport (IATA code KUU) is at Bhuntar town in Kullu. The airport is also known as Kullu-Manali airport and has more than a kilometre-long runway. Air India has regular flights to the airport from New Delhi.

==== Helicopter Service ====
Pawan Hans, the Government charter agency, provides helicopter-taxi service connecting Shimla to Chandigarh, Kullu, Kangra and Dharamshala.

=== Rail ===
Bilaspur will be a station on the under-construction Bhanupli–Leh line (also see Planned rail lines between Himachal and Ladakh). There is no close railhead available close to Manali. The nearest broad gauge railheads are at Una 250 km (155 mi) away, Kiratpur Sahib 268 km (167 mi), Kalka (275 km (171 mi)), Chandigarh (310 km (193 mi)), and Pathankot (325 km (202 mi)). The nearest narrow gauge railhead is at Joginder Nagar (147 kilometres (91 mi)). The Kalka–Shimla Railway is a nostalgic narrow-gauge route culminating at the state capital to travel by road to Manali.

== Attractions ==
- Mall Road - Main shopping street of Manali.
- Hadimba Temple – A unique wooden shrine dedicated to Hidimbi, wife of Bhima, noted for its pagoda-style architecture.
- Ghatotkacha Temple – Located close to Hadimba, dedicated to Ghatotkacha, son of Bhima and Hadimba Devi.
- Vashisht Temple – Situated in Vashisht village, known for its sulphurous hot springs and temples dedicated to Lord Vashisht, Shiva, and Rama.
- Manu Temple – An ancient shrine dedicated to Maharishi Manu, believed to be the creator of mankind in Hindu tradition.
- Rohtang Pass – Approximately 51 km from Manali, at an altitude of 3979 m (13,050 ft) above sea level; connects Kullu Valley with Lahaul and Spiti, and is a popular scenic destination.
- Bara Lacha Pass – Another high mountain pass in the region, providing access to Zanskar and Ladakh, often included in trekking circuits.
- Atal Tunnel - Runs under Rohtang Pass constructed on the Manali - Leh Highway. Longest Highway Tunnel at 10,000 feet.
- Solang Valley - Vast green slopes and a ski resort 14 Km north of Manali. Popularly known as Snow Point.
- Hamta Pass - Scenic pass between Manali and Chandra Valley.

== Environmental concerns ==
Manali has witnessed a flurry of activity related to hydroelectric power and tourism. Unplanned and rampant construction has led to severe depletion of forests and pollution of river bodies, along with garbage being disposed of on the side of the mountains. There has been a loss of habitat to various species of fauna, not limited to the Himalayan monal only.

During the summer 2025 monsoon season, heavy rainfall triggered multiple landslides in Mandi district, disrupting the Chandigarh–Manali highway near 4 Mile, Pandoh, and the Thalot Tunnel. The route was blocked for up to 24 hours, stranding hundreds of vehicles and causing significant travel delays. Statewide, over 400 roads were blocked; Mandi alone reported 232 blocked roads and 71 in the Kullu district, including Manali-bound routes. The disasters resulted in 137 deaths, with severe damage to roads, water and power infrastructure. Due to the narrow Himalayan terrain and recent landslides, traffic congestion along the Chandigarh–Manali National Highway (NH‑21) has worsened significantly. Even outside disaster periods, gridlock is common during peak tourist season, leading to long delays and often only one-way traffic management on affected stretches.

== See also ==
- Tourism in Himachal Pradesh
- List of hill stations in India
- Mall Road, Manali
- Rohtang Pass, Manali
