= Rohtang Pass =

Mountain pass

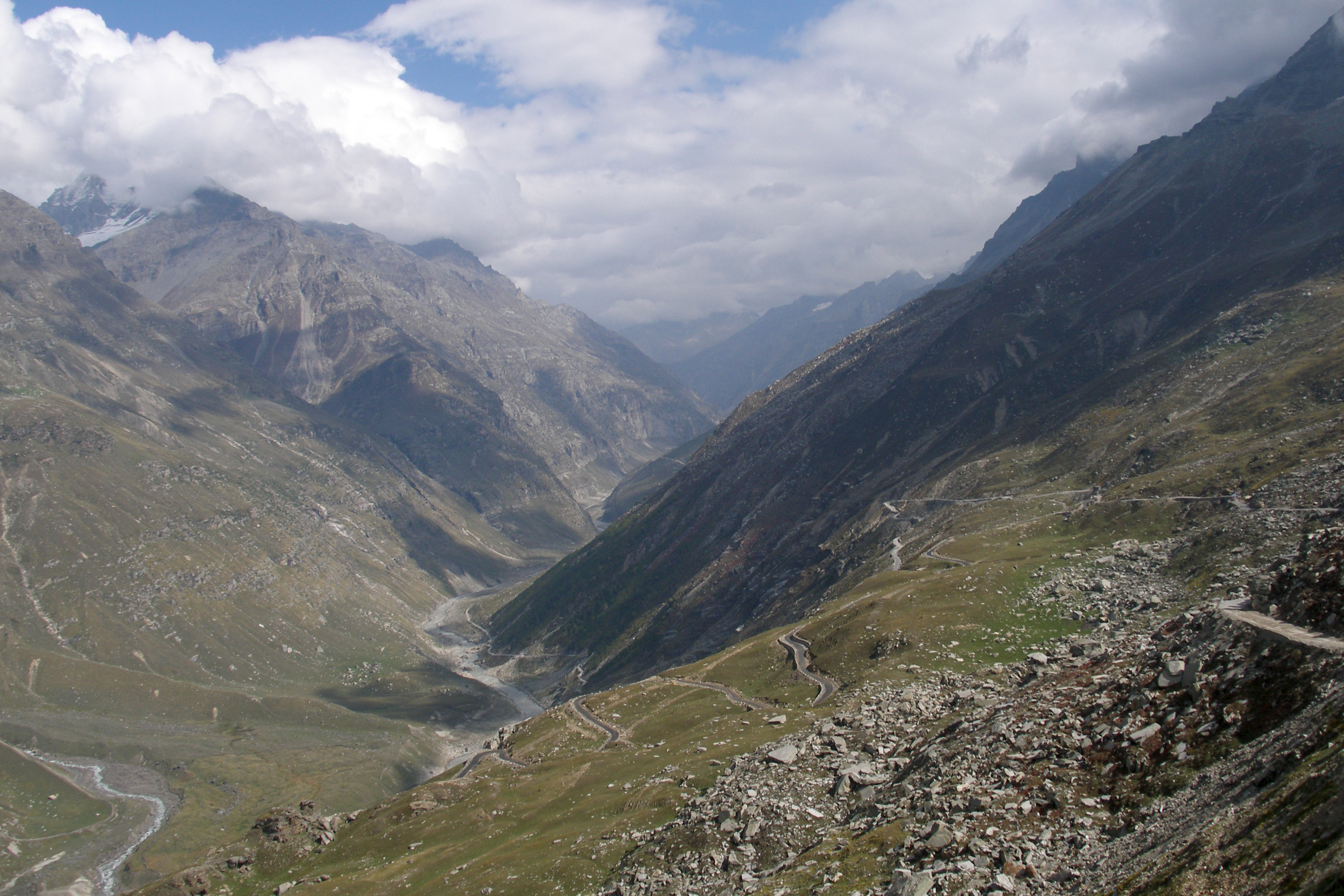
- A view from Rohtang Pass

- Location within Himachal Pradesh
- Elevation: 3,978 m (13,051 ft)
- Traversed by: Leh-Manali Highway

Third Approach
- Location: India
- Range: Pir Panjal, Himalayas
- Coordinates: 32°22′17″N 77°14′47″E

Rohtang Pass (Rohtang, literally meaning "pile of corpses") is a high mountain pass (elevation 3,980 m (13,058 ft)) on the eastern end of the Pir Panjal Range of the Himalayas around 51 km (32 mi) from Manali in the Indian state of Himachal Pradesh, It connects the Kullu Valley with the Lahaul and Spiti Valleys of Himachal Pradesh, India.

== Geography ==
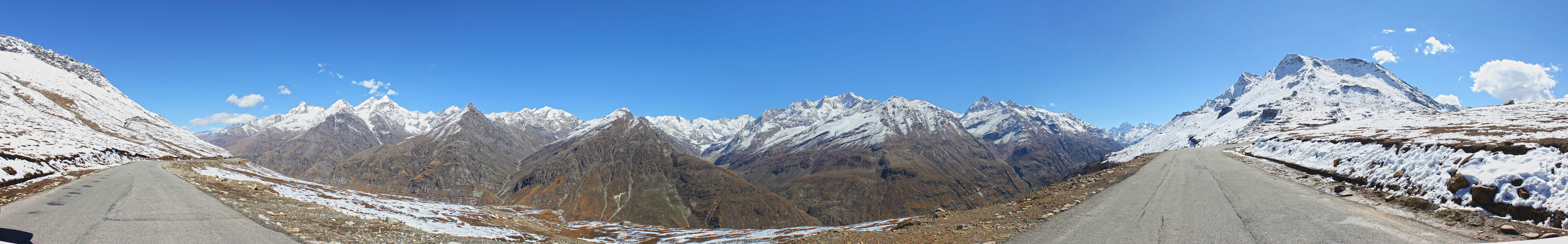
Panaromic view of Rohtang pass

The pass provides a natural divide between the Kullu Valley with a primarily Hindu culture (in the south), and the arid high-altitude Lahaul and Spiti valleys with a Buddhist culture (in the north). The pass lies on the watershed between the Chenab and Beas basins. On the southern side of this pass, the Beas River emerges from underground and flows southward and on its northern side, the Chandra River (flows from the eastern Himalayas), a source stream of the river Chenab, flows westward.

== Climate ==
Climate data for Rothang Pass, elevation 3,978 m (13,051 ft), (1991–2020, extremes 1962–2020)
| Month | Jan | Feb | Mar | Apr | May | Jun | Jul | Aug | Sep | Oct | Nov | Dec | Year |
|---|---|---|---|---|---|---|---|---|---|---|---|---|---|
| Record high °C (°F) | −7.3 (18.9) | −6.4 (20.5) | −2.4 (27.7) | 7.1 (44.8) | 15.5 (59.9) | 22.9 (73.2) | 27.3 (81.1) | 27.2 (81.0) | 24.7 (76.5) | 14.1 (57.4) | 2.0 (35.6) | −3.8 (25.2) | 27.3 (81.1) |
| Mean daily maximum °C (°F) | −20.3 (−4.5) | −19.5 (−3.1) | −14.2 (6.4) | −7.4 (18.7) | −3.4 (25.9) | 8.2 (46.8) | 12.7 (54.9) | 12.1 (53.8) | 11.6 (52.9) | 3.7 (38.7) | −14.4 (6.1) | −19.7 (−3.5) | −4.2 (24.4) |
| Mean daily minimum °C (°F) | −31.4 (−24.5) | −28.2 (−18.8) | −26.4 (−15.5) | −18.2 (−0.8) | −11.7 (10.9) | −4.6 (23.7) | 1.8 (35.2) | 1.4 (34.5) | 3.1 (37.6) | −13.2 (8.2) | −27.2 (−17.0) | −30.8 (−23.4) | −15.4 (4.2) |
| Record low °C (°F) | −44.2 (−47.6) | −43.0 (−45.4) | −40.4 (−40.7) | −36.1 (−33.0) | −27.0 (−16.6) | −16.3 (2.7) | −7.3 (18.9) | −7.7 (18.1) | 1.1 (34.0) | −28.8 (−19.8) | −41.7 (−43.1) | −43.2 (−45.8) | −44.2 (−47.6) |
| Average rainfall mm (inches) | 392.2 (15.44) | 437.1 (17.21) | 424.1 (16.70) | 232.3 (9.15) | 182.9 (7.20) | 167.9 (6.61) | 193.8 (7.63) | 199.4 (7.85) | 168.4 (6.63) | 134.8 (5.31) | 154.3 (6.07) | 287.7 (11.33) | 2,974.9 (117.13) |
| Average rainy days | 7.3 | 8.5 | 9.1 | 8.1 | 7.1 | 5.4 | 6.1 | 6.2 | 4.1 | 2.3 | 2.6 | 3.9 | 70.6 |
| Average relative humidity (%) (at 17:30 IST) | 55 | 55 | 50 | 48 | 49 | 51 | 62 | 66 | 60 | 50 | 46 | 47 | 53 |
Source: India Meteorological Department

== Overview ==
The pass is open from May to November. It is not particularly high or difficult to cross on foot by Himalayan standards, but it has a well-deserved reputation for being dangerous because of unpredictable snowstorms and blizzards.

This pass is an ancient trade route between the people on either side of Pir Panjal. There are many other passes in Lahaul and Spiti which have specific names (Kunzam La, Baralacha La, etc.). This is suggestive of the fact that this must have been the oldest and most frequented pass in the region, or the fact that it is the main pass leading from one cultural region to another, quite different one, to the north. The name Rohtang comes from Persian/ Farsi words Ruh+ Tang which means pile of dead bodies.

The former National Highway 21 (NH 21, now numbered NH 3), the road through the Kullu Valley, terminates at Manali. The road northwards over the Rohtang Pass to Keylong in Lahaul and Spiti district and on to Leh in Ladakh is not a national highway. Nonetheless, the Leh-Manali Highway has become very busy during the summer months as an alternate military route since the Kargil Conflict in 1999. Traffic jams are common as military vehicles, trucks, and goods carriers try to navigate the tight roads and rough terrain, compounded by snow and ice at certain points and the large number of tourist vehicles.

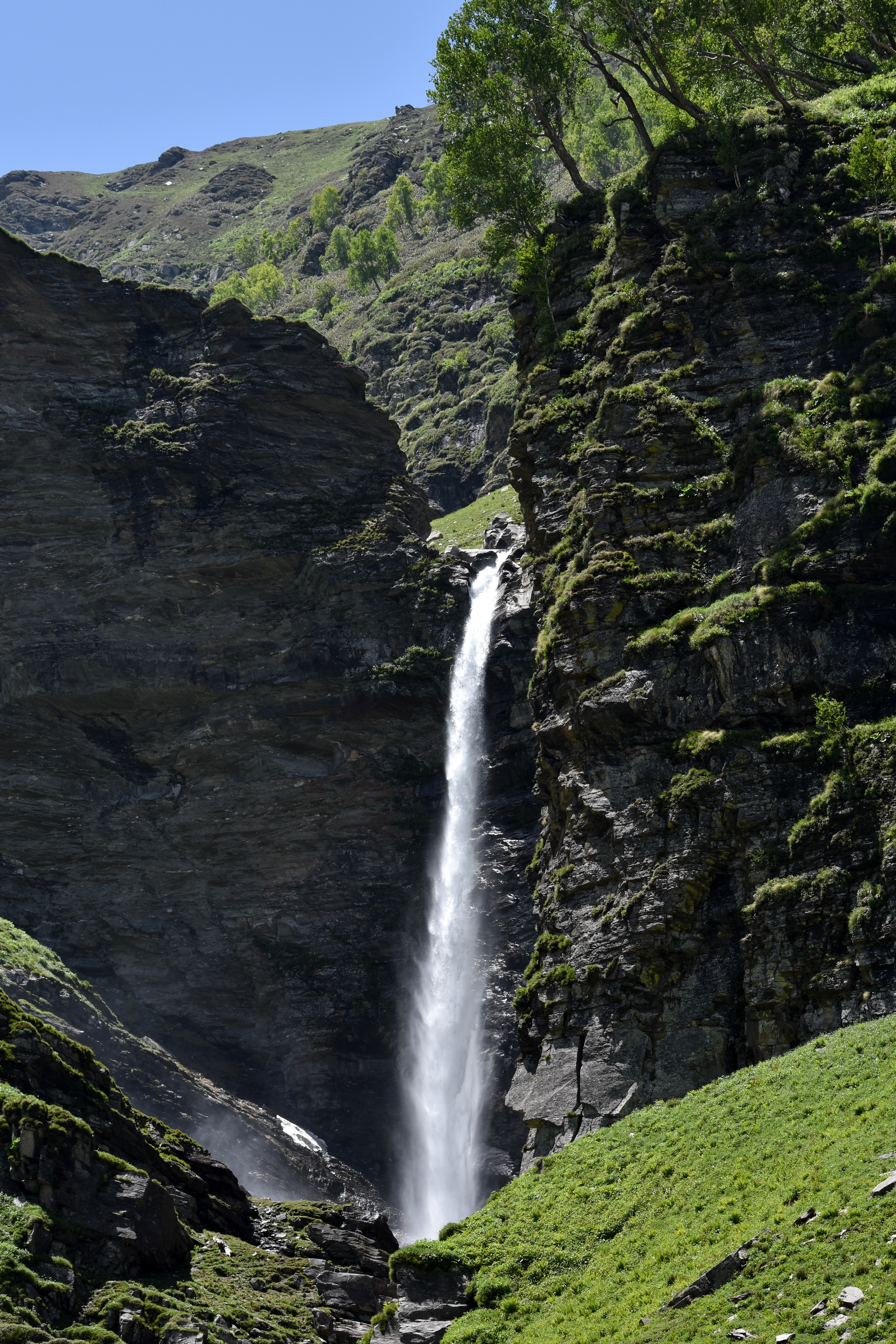
Waterfall on the Beas River, Marhi (Elev. 3,360 m (11,020 ft)

Several episodes of the History Channel's Ice Road Truckers series spinoff IRT Deadliest Roads dealt with truckers crossing the Rohtang Pass to deliver supplies. With increase in Traffic at Rohtang Valley, environmentalists fear its impact on the fragile mountain ecology. A rise in average temperature, and the consequent melting of glaciers, are also issues of severe concern.

== Latest News ==
Sometimes travelling to Rohtang Pass is difficult. Therefore, the government is stressing on setting up a ropeway between Kothi village which is in Manali and Rohtang Pass. The NGT (National Green Tribunal) has asked the state government of Himachal Pradesh to complete all the formalities to start a ropeway. With the coming of a ropeway, we can reduce carbon emission from vehicles. Heavy snowfall blocks the road in winter and a ropeway will be very useful.

== Road tunnel under the Pass ==
As the pass gets blocked by snow and the road over the pass closes from November to May rendering Lahaul and Spiti districts north of the pass inaccessible, a need was felt to build a tunnel under the pass. The project was announced by the then Prime Minister Atal Bihari Vajpayee on 3 June 2000. The work was started by BRO on 6 May 2002. The foundation stone of the project was laid on 28 June 2010 by Sonia Gandhi in her capacity as the Chairperson of National Advisory Council. The road tunnel called Atal Tunnel has been excavated and became operational on 3 October 2020 after formal inauguration by Prime Minister Narendra Modi. It obviates the need to travel over the Rohtang Pass. While it takes 4 to 6 hours to ascend, negotiate and descend the Rohtang Pass, travel through the Rohtang Tunnel takes only about 30 minutes.

== Gallery ==
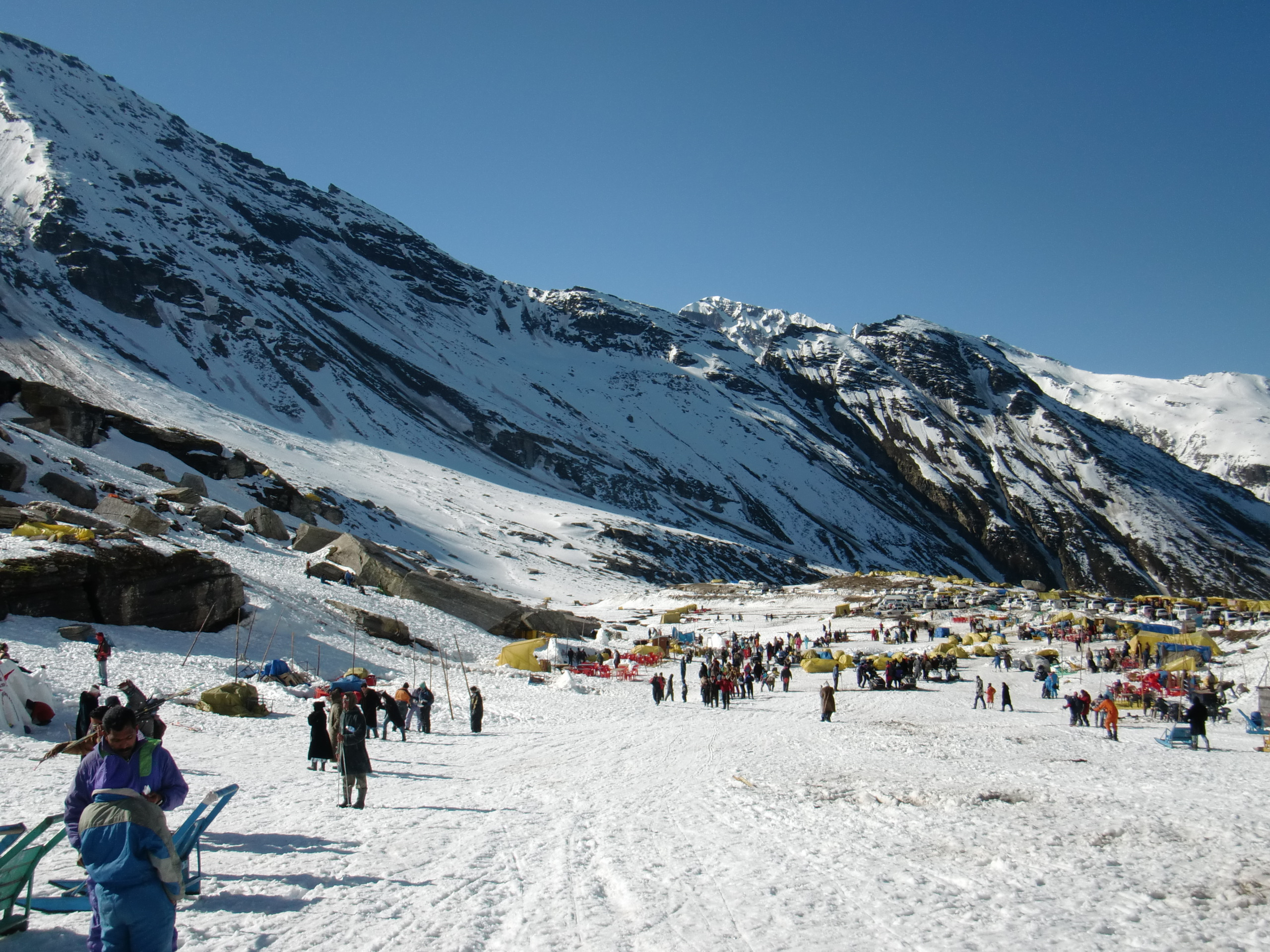
Winter sports

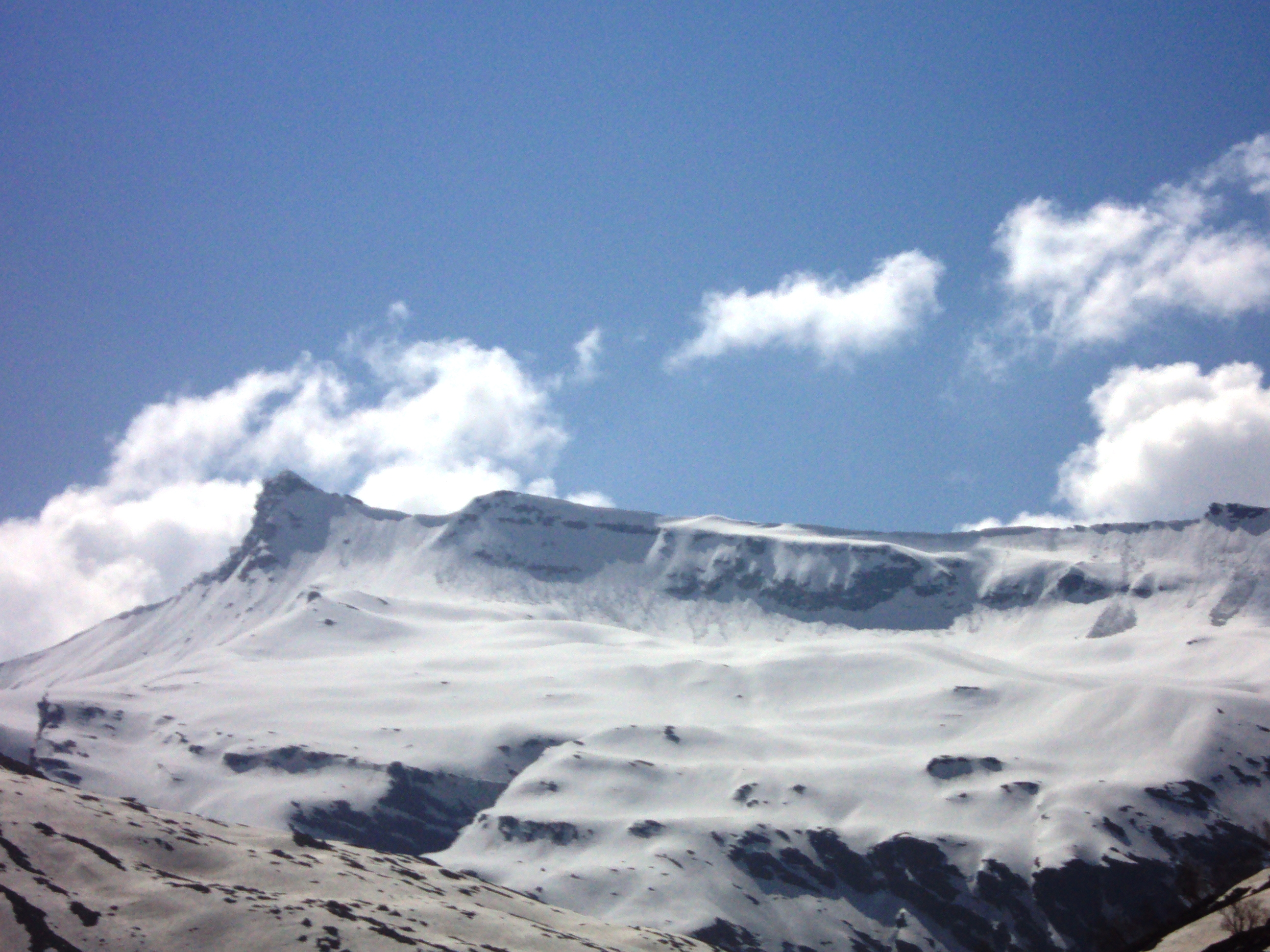
A panoramic view of distant Himalayan peaks from Rohtang Pass, May 2009

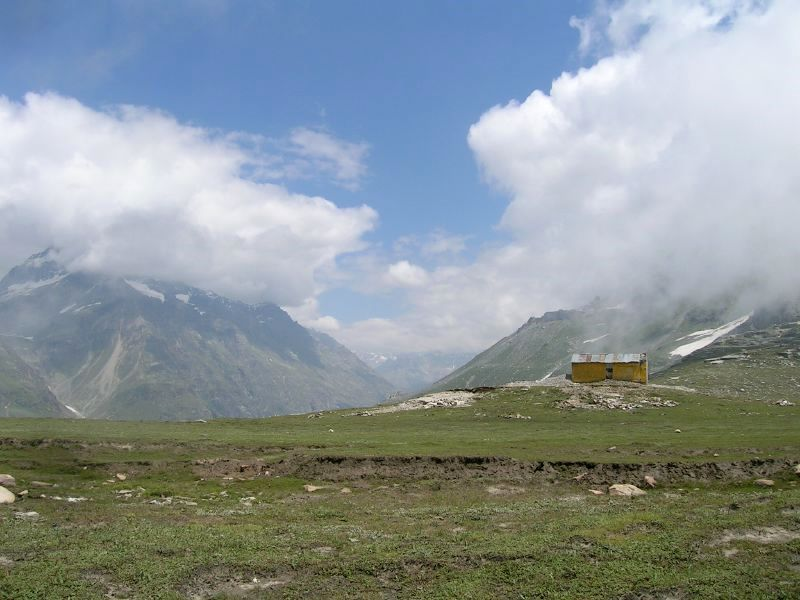
Mountains near Rohtang Pass

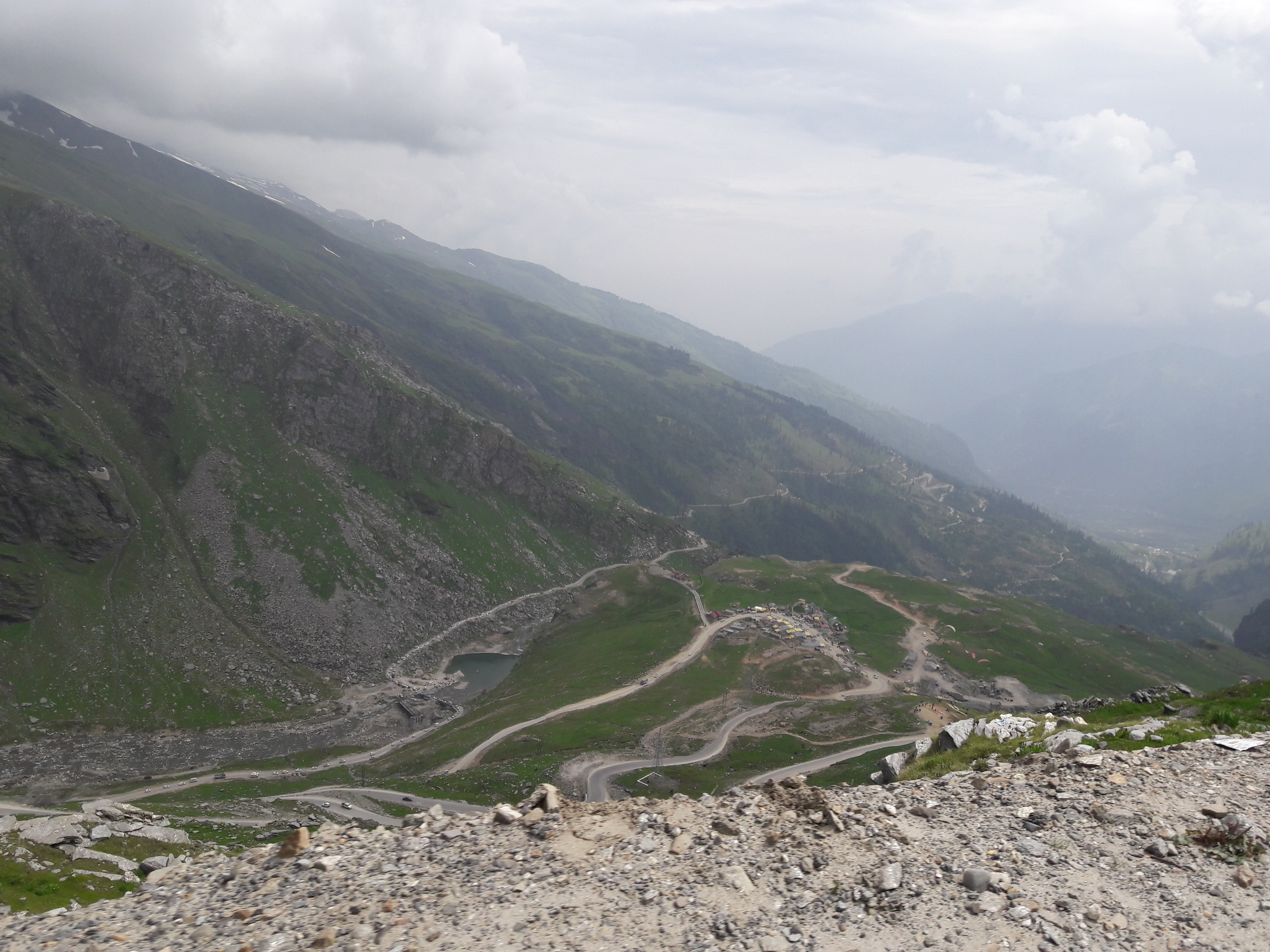
Leh-Manali Highway as seen from near the Rohtang Pass

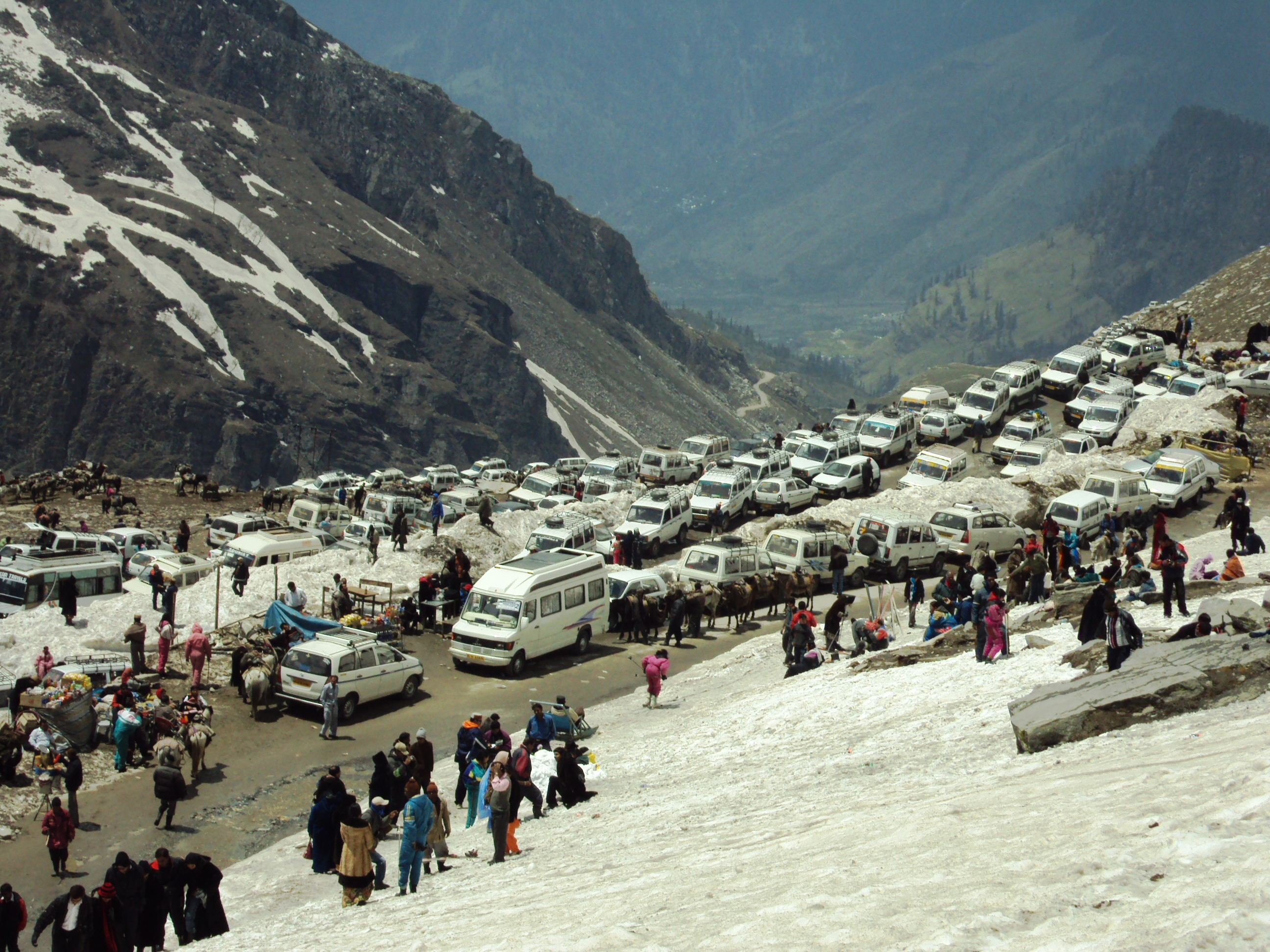
Tourist Vehicles at Rohtang Pass, May 2009

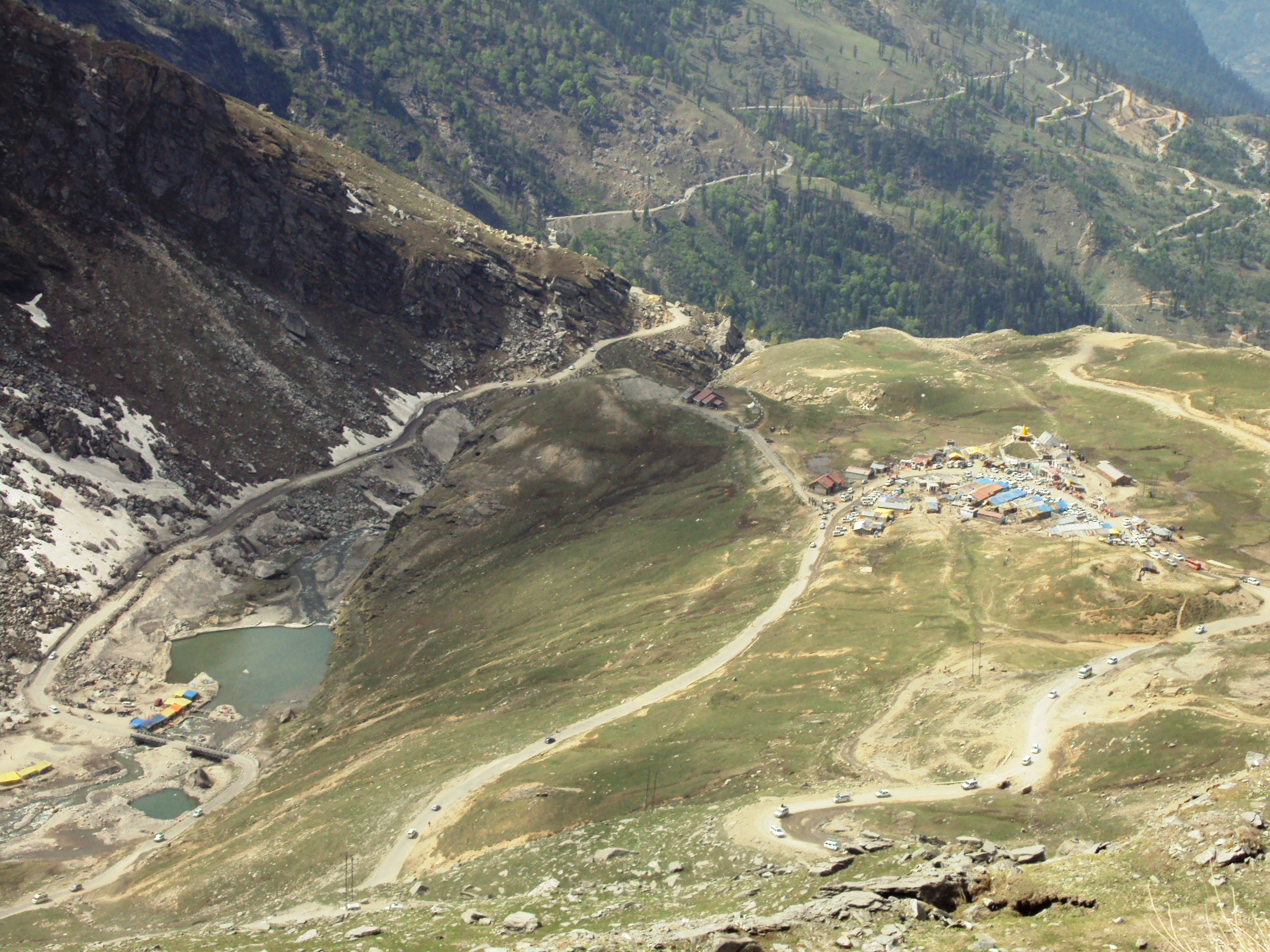
A view of Dhabas (road-side eateries) at Marhi and Leh-Manali Highway on the way to Rohtang Pass, May 2009

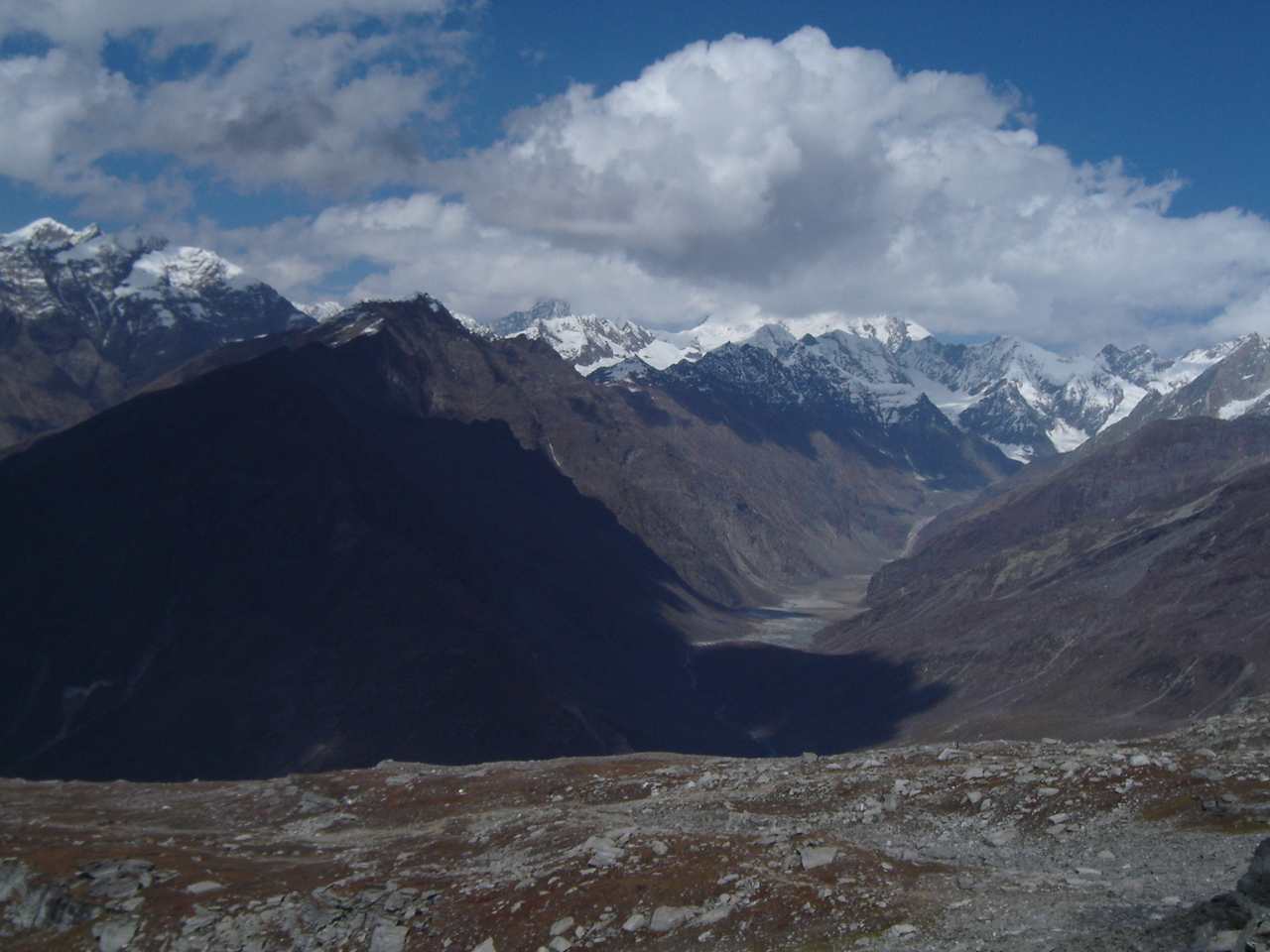
View from top of Rohtang

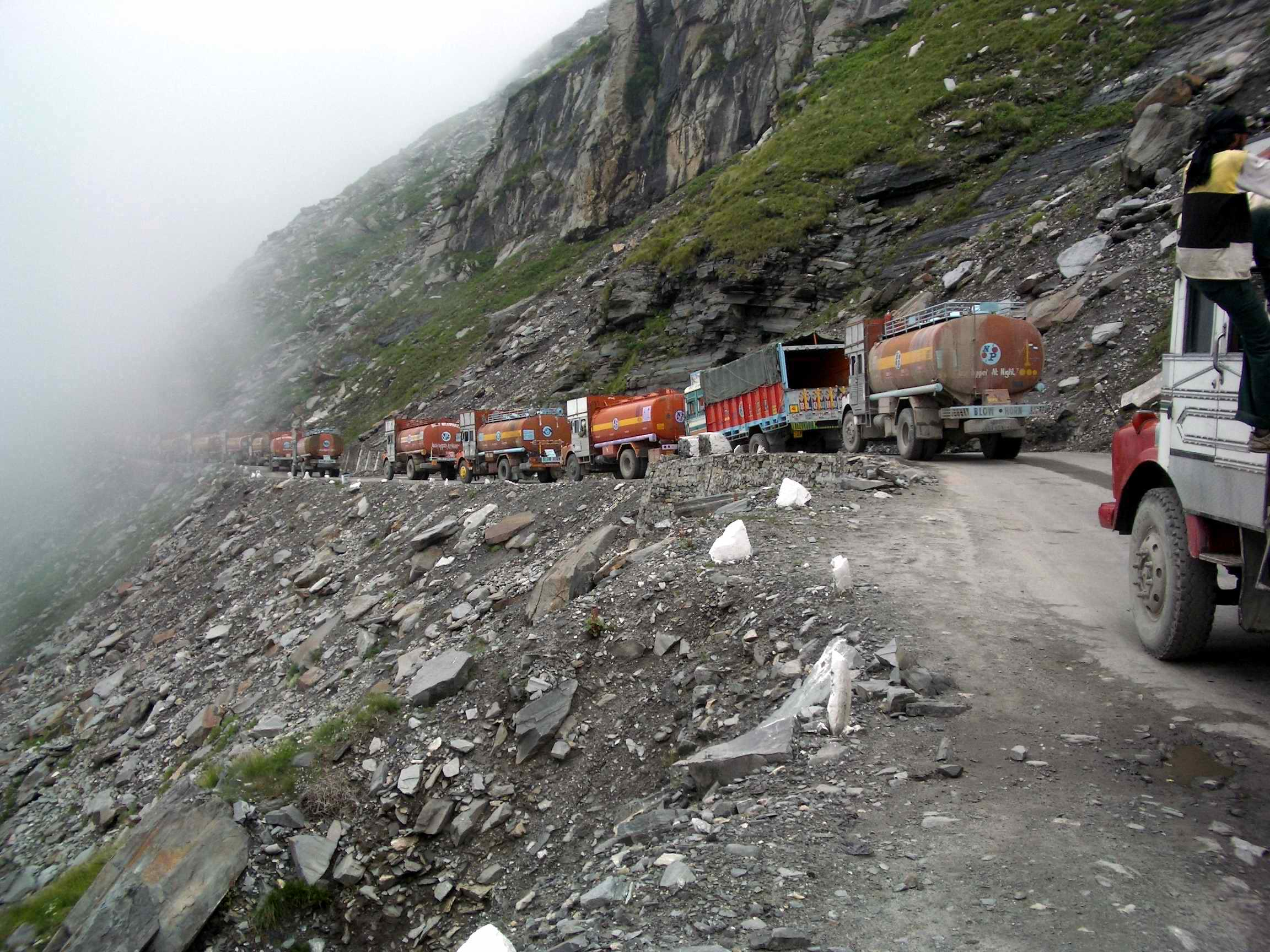
Traffic jam descending from Rohtang, 2004

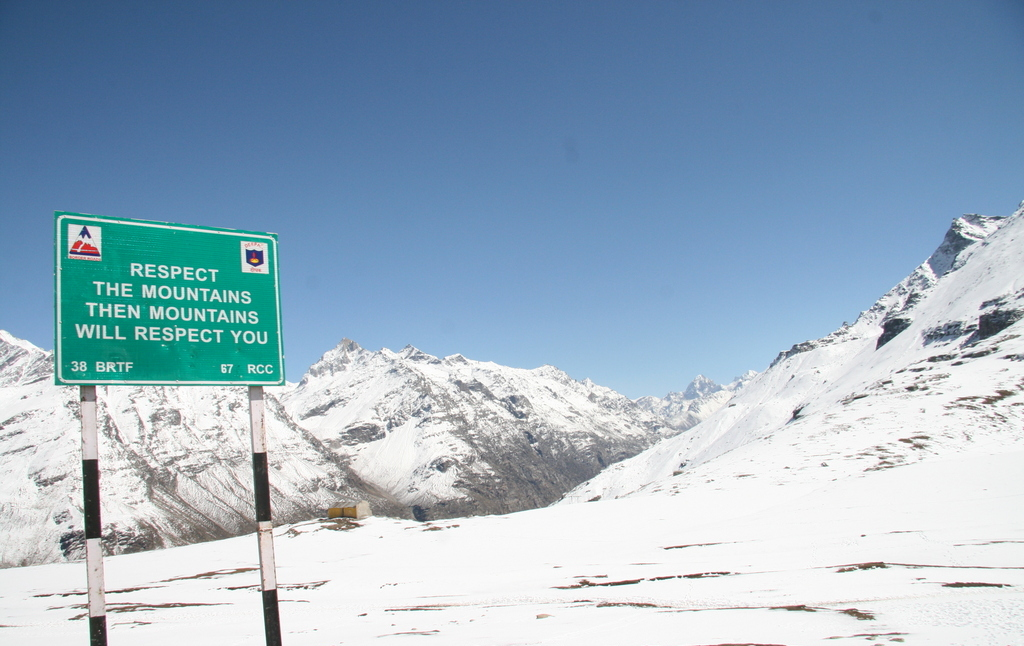
Summit of Rohtang Pass 13,000 ft above Sea Level, October 2007
