= Western Himalayas =

Western section of the Himalayas

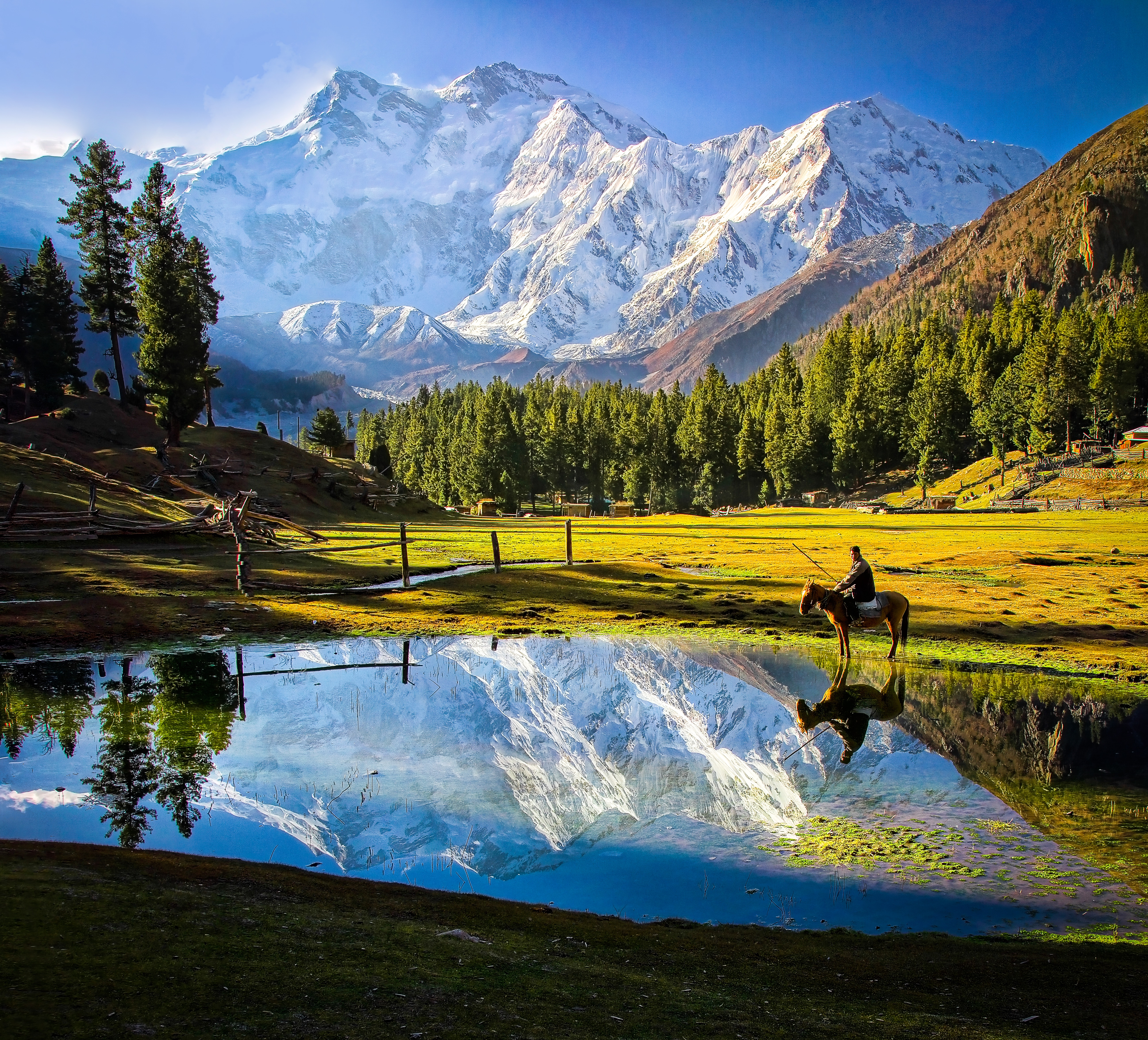
Nanga Parbat in Gilgit-Baltistan is the ninth-highest mountain on Earth. In the traditional definition of the Himalayas to be lying between the Indus and the Tsangpo-Brahmaputra rivers, it is the western anchor of the entire range, around which the Indus River skirts.

The Western Himalayas are the western half of the Himalayas, in northwestern India, far-western Nepal and northern Pakistan. Western Himalayas mainly span from Pakistan through northern India (Jammu & Kashmir, Himachal Pradesh, Uttarakhand), and regions like Dolpa, Mustang and Humla in Nepal. Four of the five tributaries of the Indus River in Punjab (Beas, Chenab, Jhelum, and Ravi) rise in the Western Himalayas; while the fifth, the Sutlej, cuts through the range after rising in Tibet Autonomous Region of China

Included within the Western Himalayas are the Zanskar Range, the Pir Panjal Range, Gurans Himal, the Saipal Range and the Dhauladhar Range, and western parts of the Sivalik Range and the Great Himalayas. The highest point is Nanga Parbat (26,660 feet or 8,126 metres), at the northwestern end of the region. It is part of the Himalayan biodiversity hotspot.

Climate in high altitudes of the Western Himalayas is poorly known due to the difficulties in maintaining observational networks. A historical name for a substantial proportion of the Western Himalayan range was the Punjab Hills.

== Rivers ==
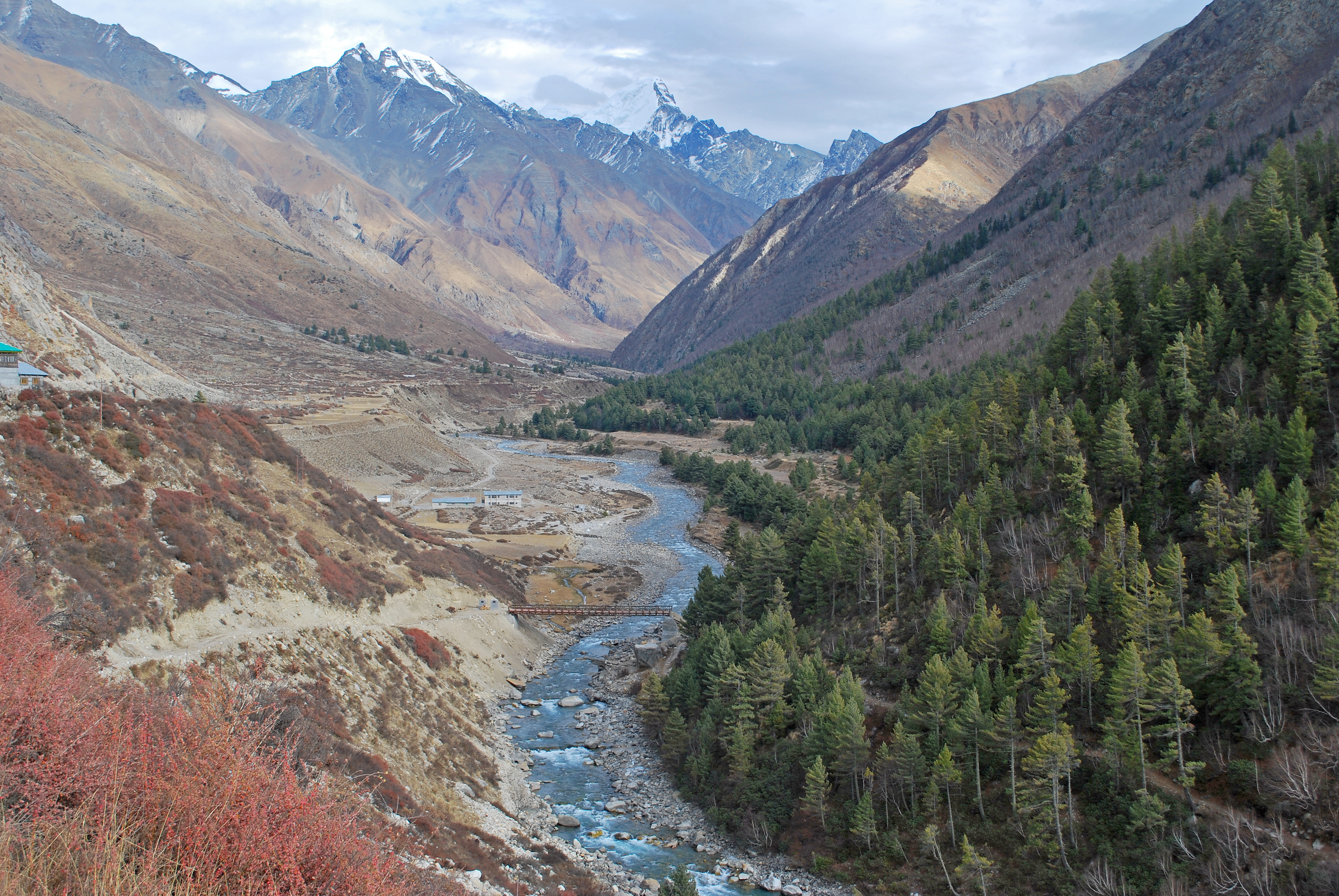
The Baspa River, a major glacier-fed Himalayan tributary of the Sutlej, flowing through Kinnaur.

The Western Himalayas are drained by several perennial, glacier-fed rivers that are vital for irrigation, hydroelectricity, and drinking water:

- Jhelum River begins in the Pir Panjal Range in Jammu & Kashmir and flows northwest through the Vale of Kashmir into Azad Jammu & Kashmir before joining the Chenab near Jhang.
- Chenab River is formed by the Chandra and Bhaga rivers in the Lahaul–Spiti region, traverses the Chenab Valley in Jammu & Kashmir, and contributes to the Indus system.
- Ravi River originates in the Chamba Valley in Himachal Pradesh before flowing into the Punjab plains.
- Beas River rises at Beas Kund near Rohtang Pass, flows through Kullu and Kangra valleys, and ultimately meets the Sutlej.
- Sutlej River, rising near Lake Rakshastal in Tibet, enters India via Shipki La, traverses Kinnaur with tributaries like the Spiti and Baspa rivers, and enters the Punjab plains near Ropar.

== Ecology ==
=== Flora ===
- Northwestern Himalayan alpine shrub and meadows
- Western Himalayan alpine shrub and meadows
- Western Himalayan broadleaf forests
- Western Himalayan subalpine conifer forests
- Margalla hills

== Economic activities ==
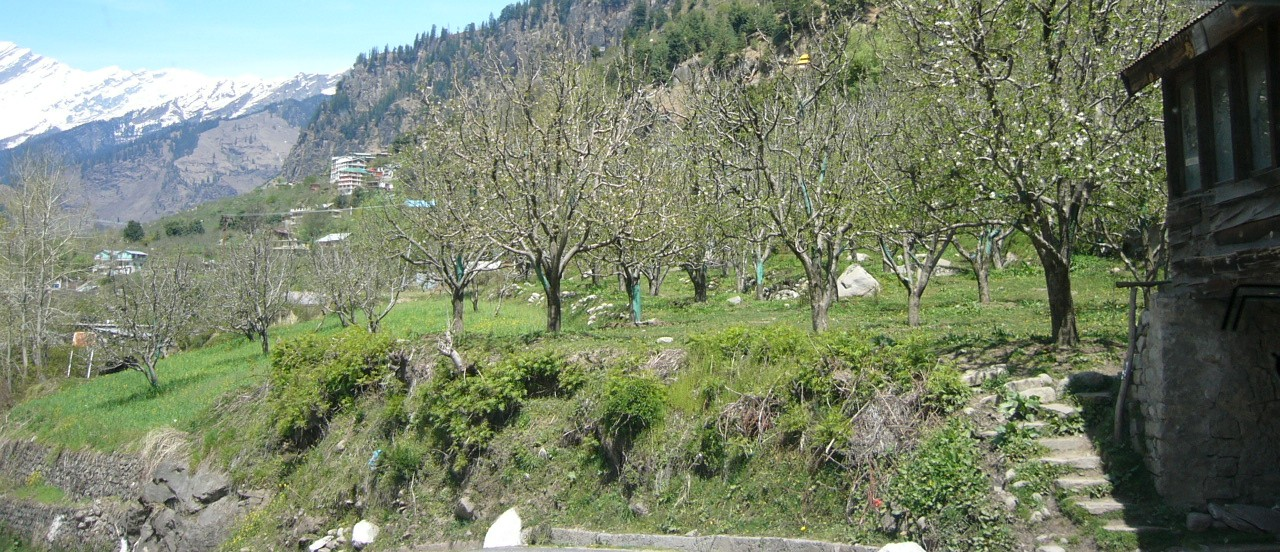
An Apple orchard near Manali, Himachal Pradesh.

Agriculture is the main economic activity in the area. The main crops grown in this region are paddy and wheat. The region is a major hub of horticulture in the Indian subcontinent. Apples are grown in Kashmir, Kinnaur, Kishtwar, and Kullu valleys, as well as the hills of Shimla. These regions, particularly Kashmir and the Shimla Hills, produce almost all the apples grown in India and South Asia. Saffron is also grown in Kashmir and Kishtwar, while dry fruits are grown in several areas of the western Himalayan region. Tea is grown in the Kangra valley. A large number of people from nomadic pastoral communities such as Gurjars, Bakarwals and Gaddis living in the alpine and subalpine areas of these mountains engage in cattle rearing.

Tourism is another major industry. The city of Srinagar in the Kashmir Valley is famous for its houseboats and shikaras on the Dal and Nigeen lakes. Shogran, Murree, Pahalgam, Sonmarg, Gulmarg, Dalhousie, Chamba, Khajjiar, Mcleodganj, Dharamshala, Palampur, Rewalsar, Prashar, Kullu, Manali, Kasol, Banjar, Solang, Kasauli, Kufri, Narkanda and Shimla are famous hill stations.

Amarnath, Vaishno Devi, Jwalaji, Chintpurni, Chamunda Devi, Bajreshwari Devi, Naina Devi, Baglamukhi, Hidimba Devi, Baba Balaknath Deotsidh, Bhimakali, Jakhu and Tara Devi are important pilgrimage centres attracting several hundred thousands of pilgrims each year. Gulmarg and Manali are popular winter-sports destinations where activities such as skiing, snowboarding, sledding etc. are done, while adventure sports like paragliding are done at Bir and Billing.

Several perennial rivers flow through these mountains which makes them ideal for hydroelectricity generation, and thus, several hydroelectric projects are complete or underway in Pakistan and India.

== Climate ==
The climate of the Western Himalayas varies significantly with altitude and location. Lower elevations experience temperate conditions, while higher altitudes are subject to subarctic and alpine climates. Winters are long and harsh in the upper reaches, with heavy snowfall between November and March. In contrast, the foothills enjoy a relatively mild winter and warm summer.

- Western Disturbances, originating from the Mediterranean region, are the primary source of winter precipitation. These systems bring snow to the higher altitudes and rainfall to the valleys.
- Summers are generally cooler than the adjacent plains, making hill stations like Shimla and Srinagar popular retreats.
- Due to the rain shadow effect caused by the Pir Panjal range, areas like Ladakh and Spiti Valley remain dry throughout the year, receiving less than 100 mm of precipitation annually.

The climate plays a crucial role in shaping the region’s ecology, agriculture, and tourism patterns.

== Geology ==
The Western Himalayas were formed as a result of the ongoing collision between the Indian and Eurasian tectonic plates, a process that began approximately 50 million years ago. The region continues to experience seismic activity, with numerous fault lines and thrust zones including the Main Boundary Thrust (MBT) and Main Central Thrust (MCT).

Key geological features:

- The Greater Himalayan crystalline complex is composed of high-grade metamorphic rocks such as schist and gneiss.
- The Zanskar and Pir Panjal ranges feature sedimentary rocks like limestone and shale.
- The Sivalik Hills at the outermost edge of the Himalayas consist of unconsolidated sediments, prone to erosion and landslides.

Frequent landslides, rockfalls, and glacial movements are ongoing geological processes that shape the dynamic Himalayan landscape.

== Transportation and Connectivity ==
Transportation in the Western Himalayas is challenging due to rugged terrain, high altitudes, and seasonal weather variations. However, the region is gradually becoming more accessible due to ongoing infrastructure development.

- Roadways: The National Highway 44 connects Srinagar to Jammu, while NH-3 and NH-5 connect key parts of Himachal Pradesh. Rohtang Pass and Zoji La are crucial seasonal mountain passes.
- Railways: The Kalka–Shimla Railway, a UNESCO World Heritage Site, serves as a scenic narrow-gauge connection to Shimla. The Udhampur–Srinagar–Baramulla line is under expansion to improve connectivity in Jammu & Kashmir.
- Airports: Major airports include Srinagar, Shimla, Kullu-Manali (Bhuntar), and Leh, providing limited but vital air access.
- Tunnels: The Atal Tunnel, one of the highest in the world, has dramatically improved all-weather connectivity between Manali and Lahaul-Spiti.

Seasonal closures due to snow, landslides, and floods often hamper accessibility, especially in remote districts.

== Cultural significance ==
Many sites revered by people belonging to various faiths and religions.

=== Pilgrimage sites ===
- Amarnath Cave Temple, Jammu and Kashmir
- Sharada Peeth, Neelum
- Chintpurni, Una
- Jwala Ji, Kangra
- Baglamukhi Temple, Kangra
- Bajreshwari Devi, Kangra
- Chamunda Devi, Kangra
- Aadi Himani Chamunda, Kangra
- Naina Devi, Bilaspur
- Rewalsar, Mandi
- Triloknath, Lahaul and Spiti
- Vaishno Devi, Katra
- Hidimba Devi Temple, Manali
- Bhimakali Temple, Sarahan
- Shikari Devi, Karsog
- Shali Tibba, Shimla
- Tara Devi Temple, Shimla
- Jakhu Temple, Shimla
- Baba Balak Nath Deotsidh, Hamirpur
- Darbar Sharif
- Jamia Masjid

== See also ==
- Eastern Himalayas
- Himalayas
- Himachal Pradesh
- Kashmir
- Punjab
- Mahasu region
- Hill States of India
