= Tourism in Himachal Pradesh =

Himachal Pradesh, India is popularly known for its Himalayan landscapes and hill-stations. Many outdoor activities such as rock climbing, mountain biking, paragliding, ice-skating, trekking, rafting, and heli-skiing are tourist attractions in Himachal Pradesh.

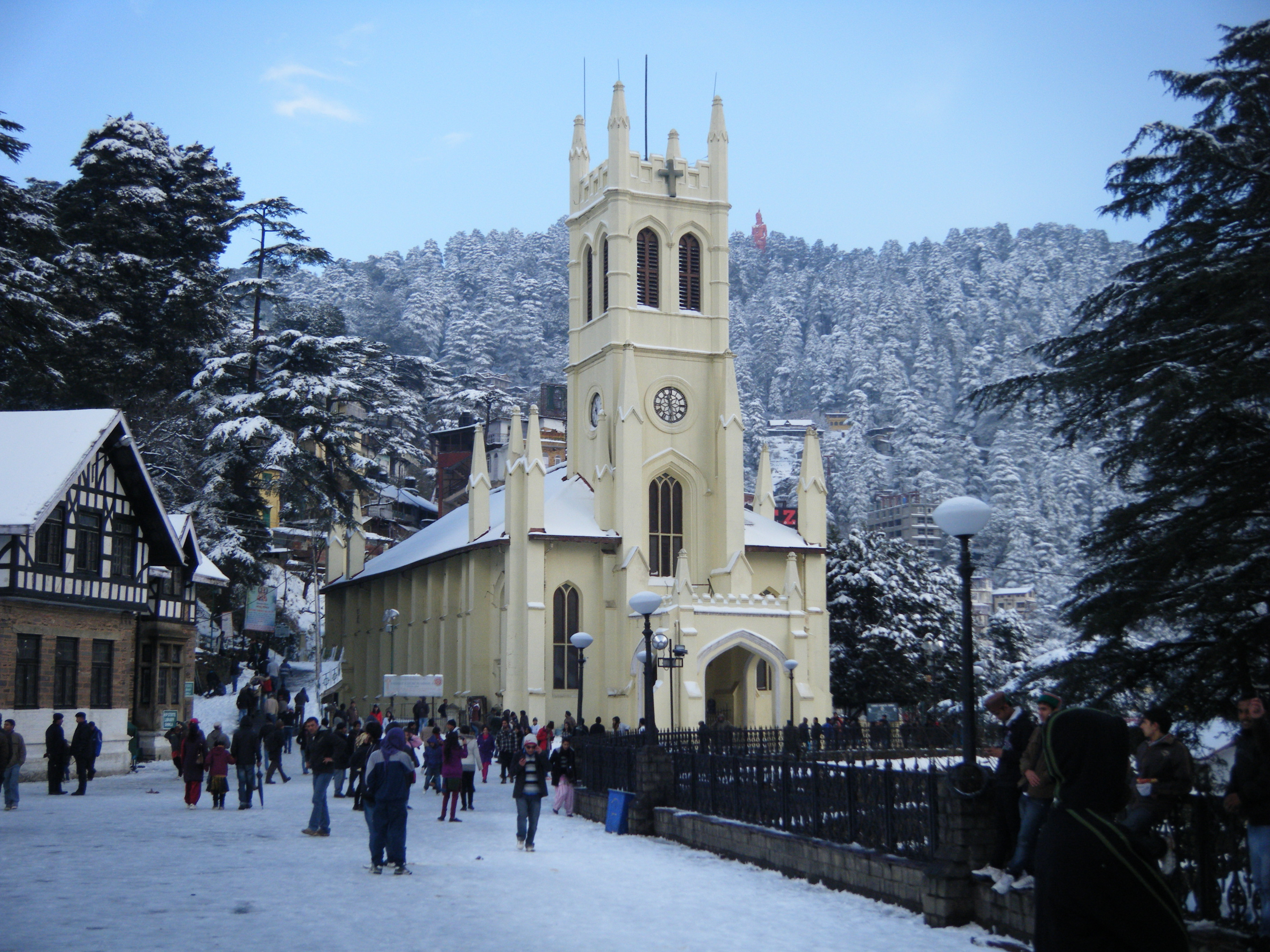
Christ Church, Shimla

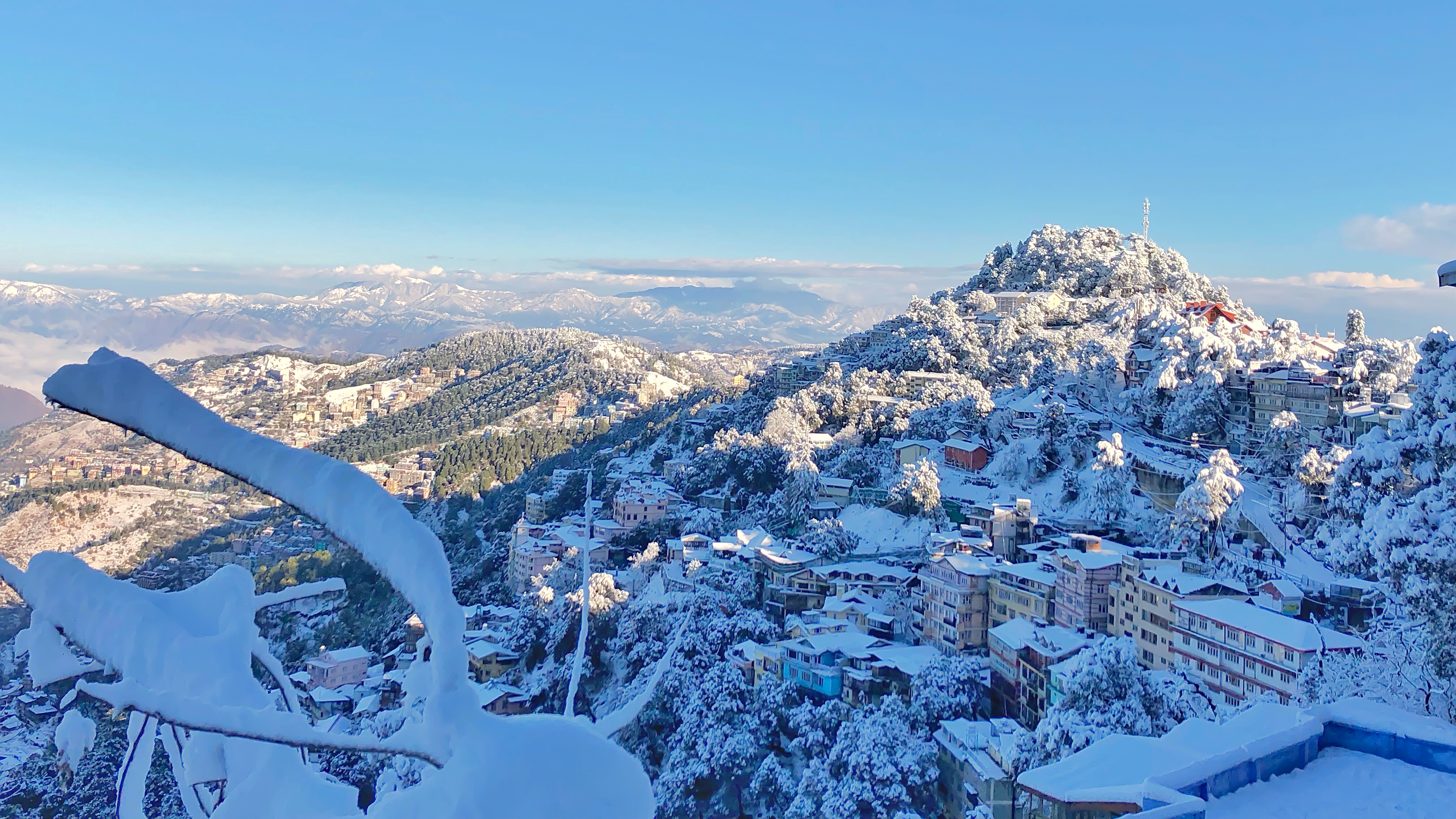
Shimla city view in Winter

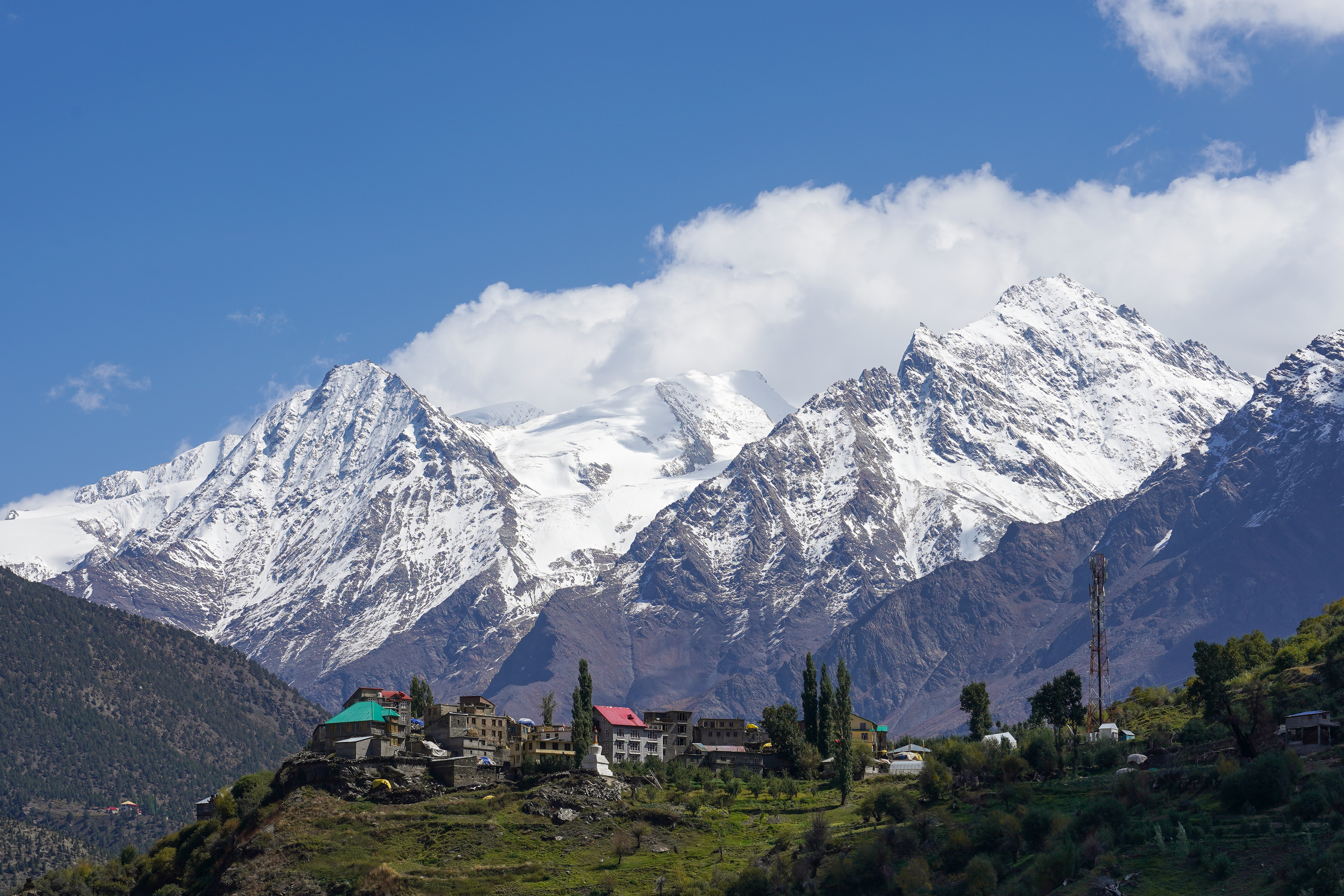
Kardang, Himachal Pradesh

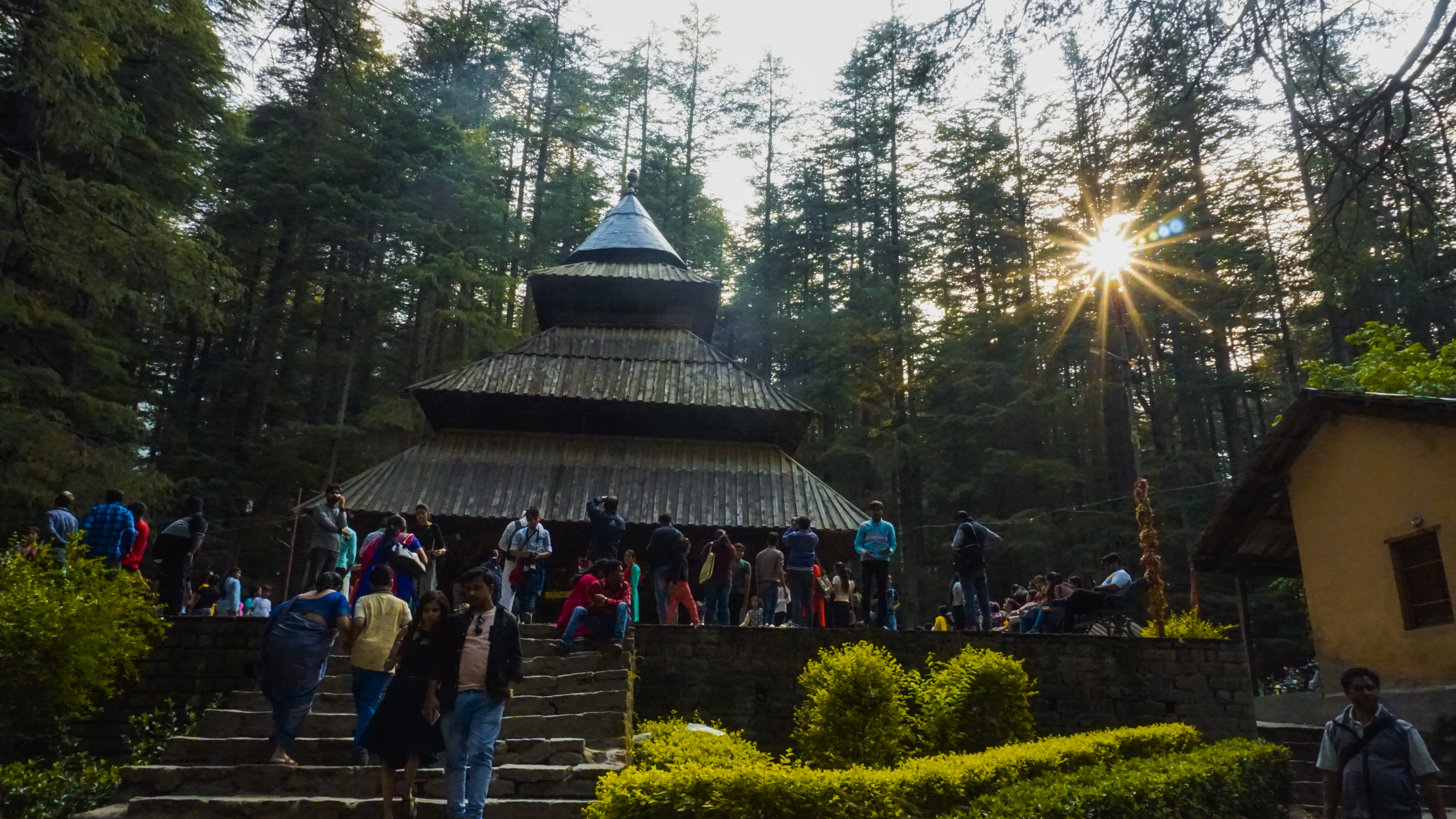
Hidimba Devi Temple

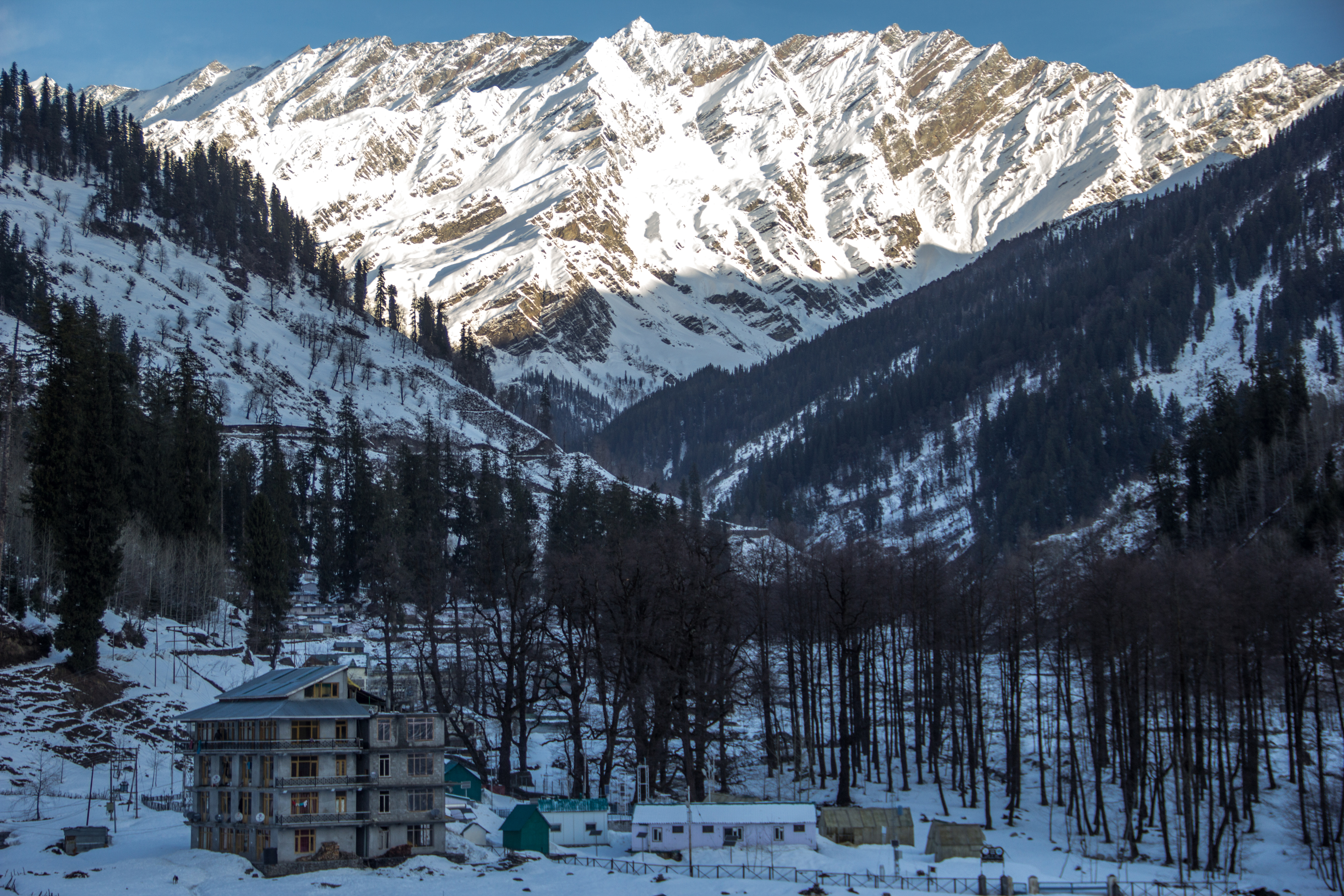
Manali, Himachal Pradesh

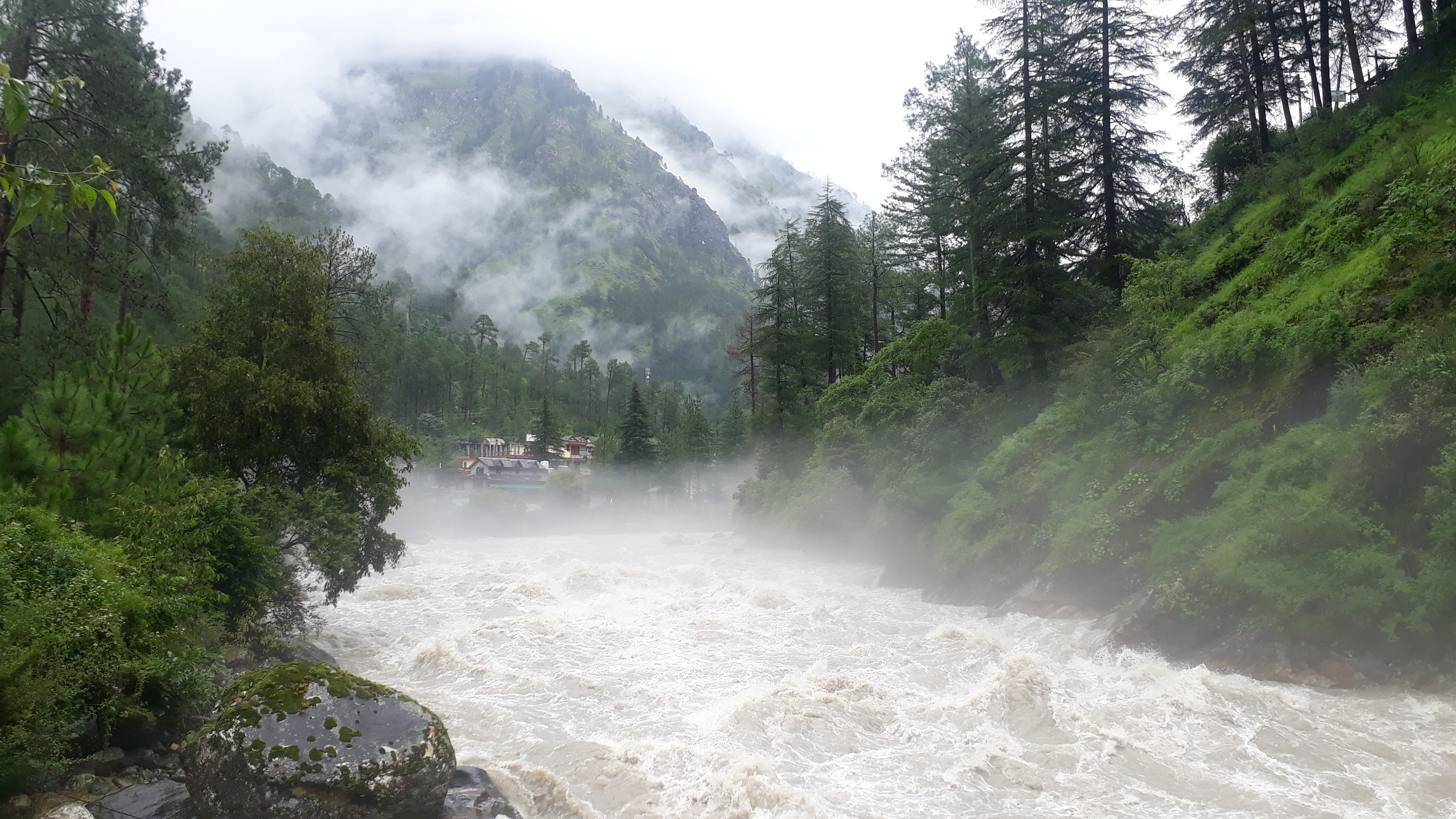
Parvati River (Himachal Pradesh)

Until the British reign, tourism in Himachal Pradesh was very limited to a few places around the hills and some spiritual destinations. The British developed hill stations during their reign one of them being Shimla which they called The Summer Capital of India. After the British rule, tourism in Himachal Pradesh was on the rise with the highest number of tourists in the mid 1980s and 1990s.

Shimla, the state capital, is popular among tourists. The Kalka-Shimla Railway is a mountain railway which is a UNESCO World Heritage Site. Shimla is also a skiing attraction in India. Other hill stations include Manali, Kinnuar, Kasol, Parvati Valley, Chamba, Kullu, Kinnar Kailesh, and Kasauli.

Dharamshala, home of the Dalai Lama, is known for its Tibetan monasteries and Buddhist temples. Many trekking expeditions also begin here.

The state has five shakta pithas - Chintpurni, Jwalamukhi Temple, Bajreshwari Mata Temple, Shri Chamunda Devi Mandir and Naina Devi Temple.

Himachal is also known for its adventure tourism activities like ice skating, paragliding, rafting, skiing, boating, fishing, trekking and horse riding in different parts of the state.

The state has some of the highest mountain passes in the world - Rohtang Pass, Baralacha La, Kunzum La, Borasu Pass and Hampta Pass.

== Religious tourism ==
The five shakta pithas - Chintpurni, Jwalamukhi Temple, Bajreshwari Mata Temple, Shri Chamunda Devi Mandir and Naina Devi Temple attract a constant flow of tourists all year long.

== Adventure tourism ==
Rafting, paragliding, skiing, hot air ballooning and trekking are popular adventure attractions.

Paragliding take off site at Billing, Kangra

== Flora and fauna ==
The Great Himalayan National Park is found in the Kullu district which is a UNESCO World Heritage Site. It has an area of 620 sq km and ranging from an altitude of 1500 meters to 4500 meters and was created in 1984. There are various forest types found here such as deodars, silver firs, spruce, oak and alpine pastures. In the Great Himalayan National Park, there are a variety of animals found such as snow leopards, Himalayan yak, Himalayan black bear, western tragopan, monal and musk deer. Moreover, there are sanctuaries such as Naina Devi Sanctuary in Bilaspur district with an area of 120 sq km, Gobind Sagar Sanctuary with an area of 100 sq km and Tirthan Wildlife Sanctuary. The Gobind Sagar Lake has fish species such as Mrigal carp, silver carp, katla, mahseer and rohu. Narkanda, located in at an altitude of around 8850 feet, is known for its apple orchards. It is located between the river valleys of Giri and Sutlej.

== Fairs and festivals ==
There are a variety of festivals celebrated by the locals of Himachal Pradesh who worship gods and goddesses. There are over 2000 villages in Himachal Pradesh which celebrate festivals such as Kullu Dussehra, Sujanpur Holi Festival, Chamba’s Minjar, Renuka ji Fair, Lohri, Halda, Phagli, Lossar and Mandi Shivratri. There are approximately 6000 temples in Himachal Pradesh with a known one being Bijli Mahadev. The temple is seen as a 20-meter structure built in stone which, according to locals, is known to attract lighting.

In August 2020 the Himachal Pradesh Government announced that they will be running vistadome buses inside Rohtang tunnel for tourists.

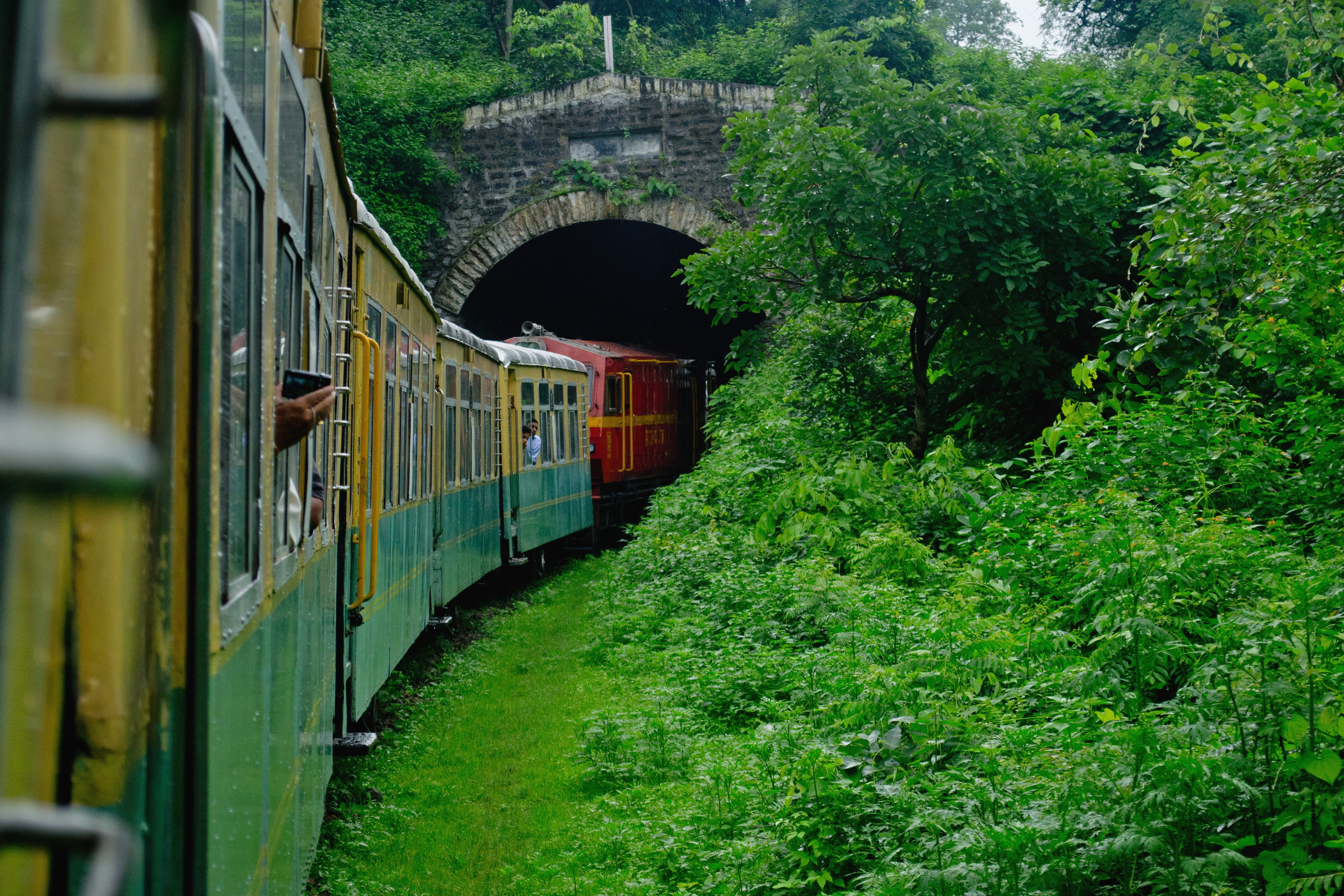
Kalka–Shimla Railway is a mountain railway in Himachal Pradesh.

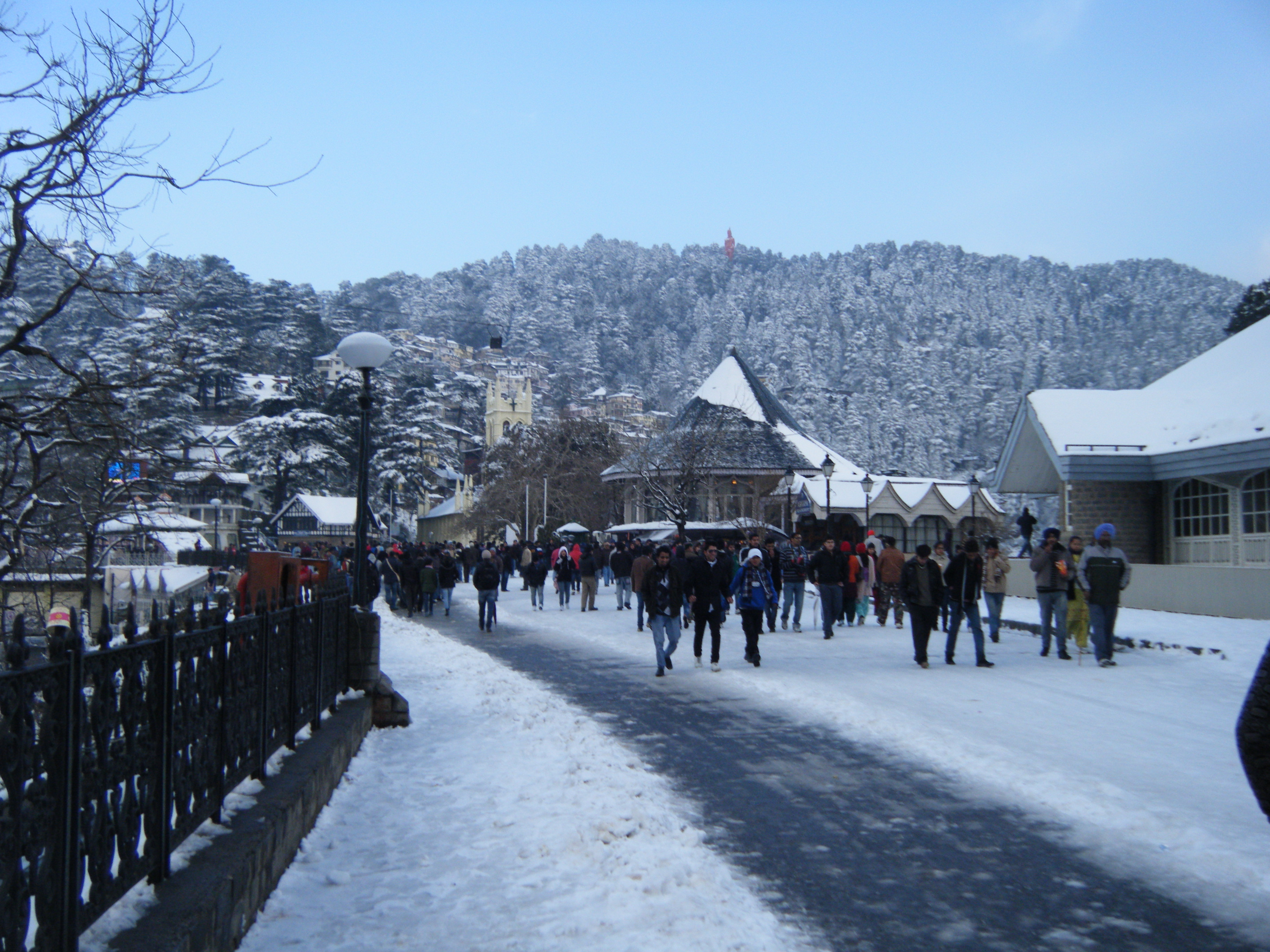
The Ridge, Shimla

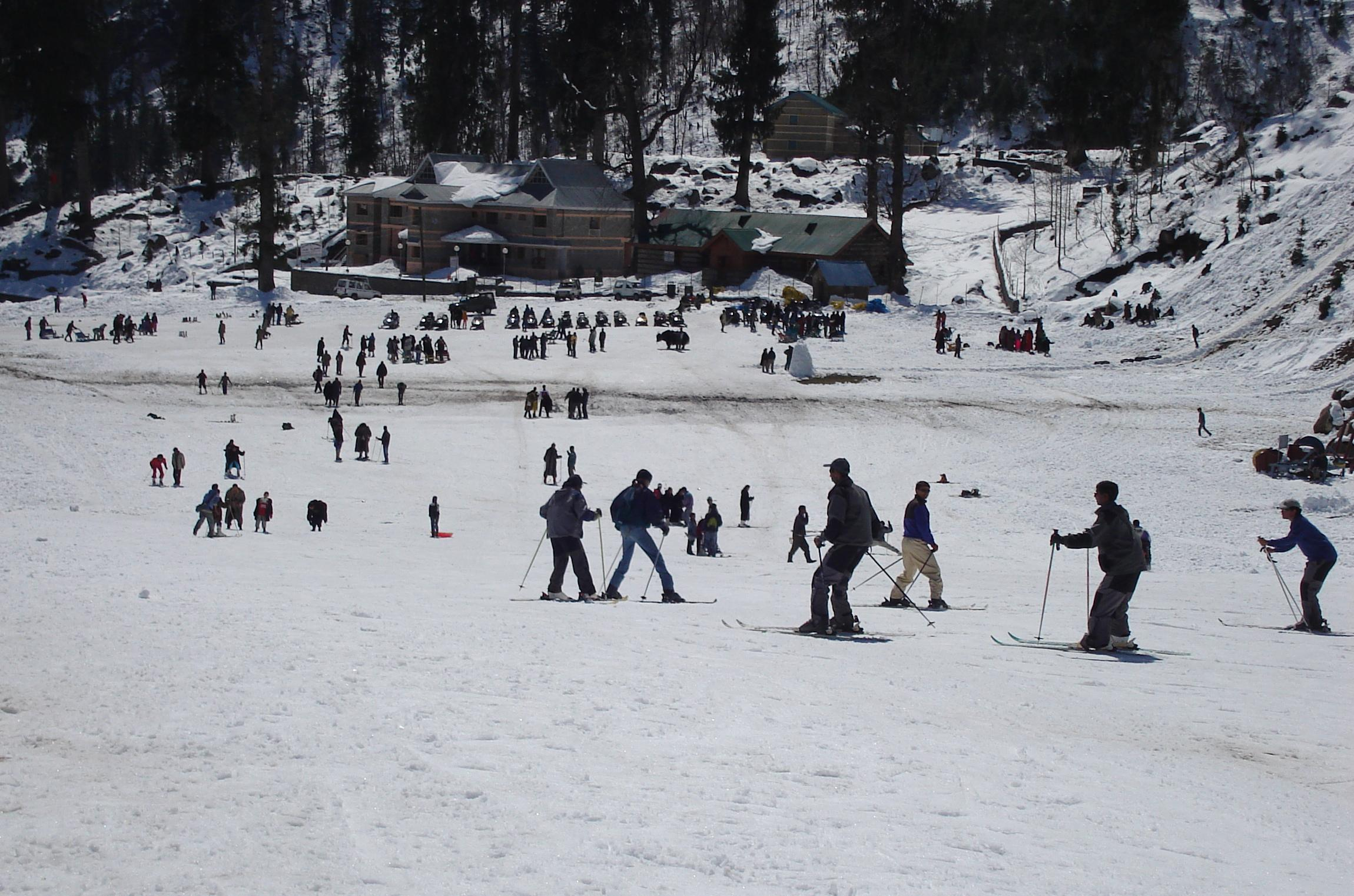
Skiing in Manali

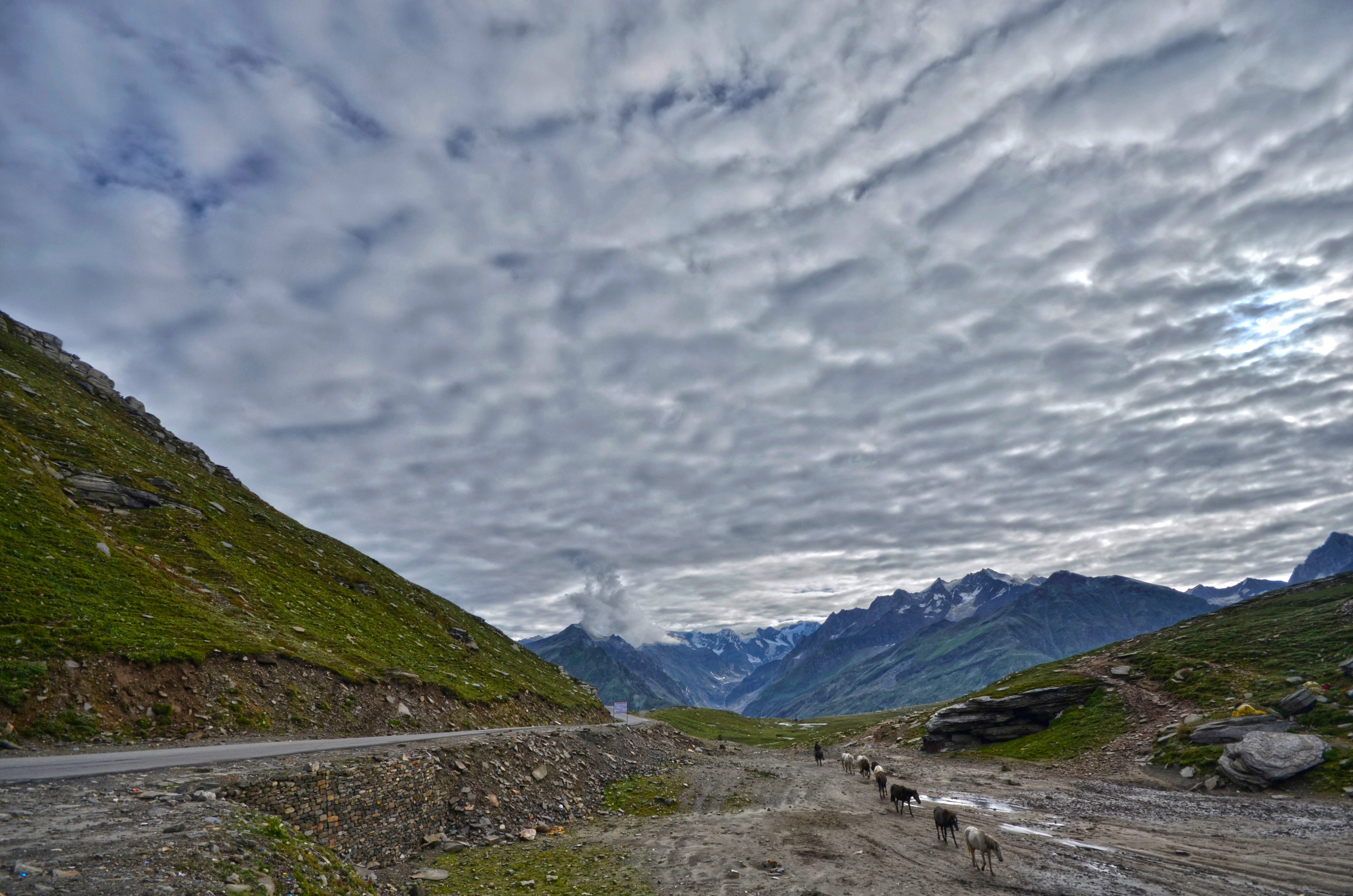
Rohtang Pass in Himachal Pradesh

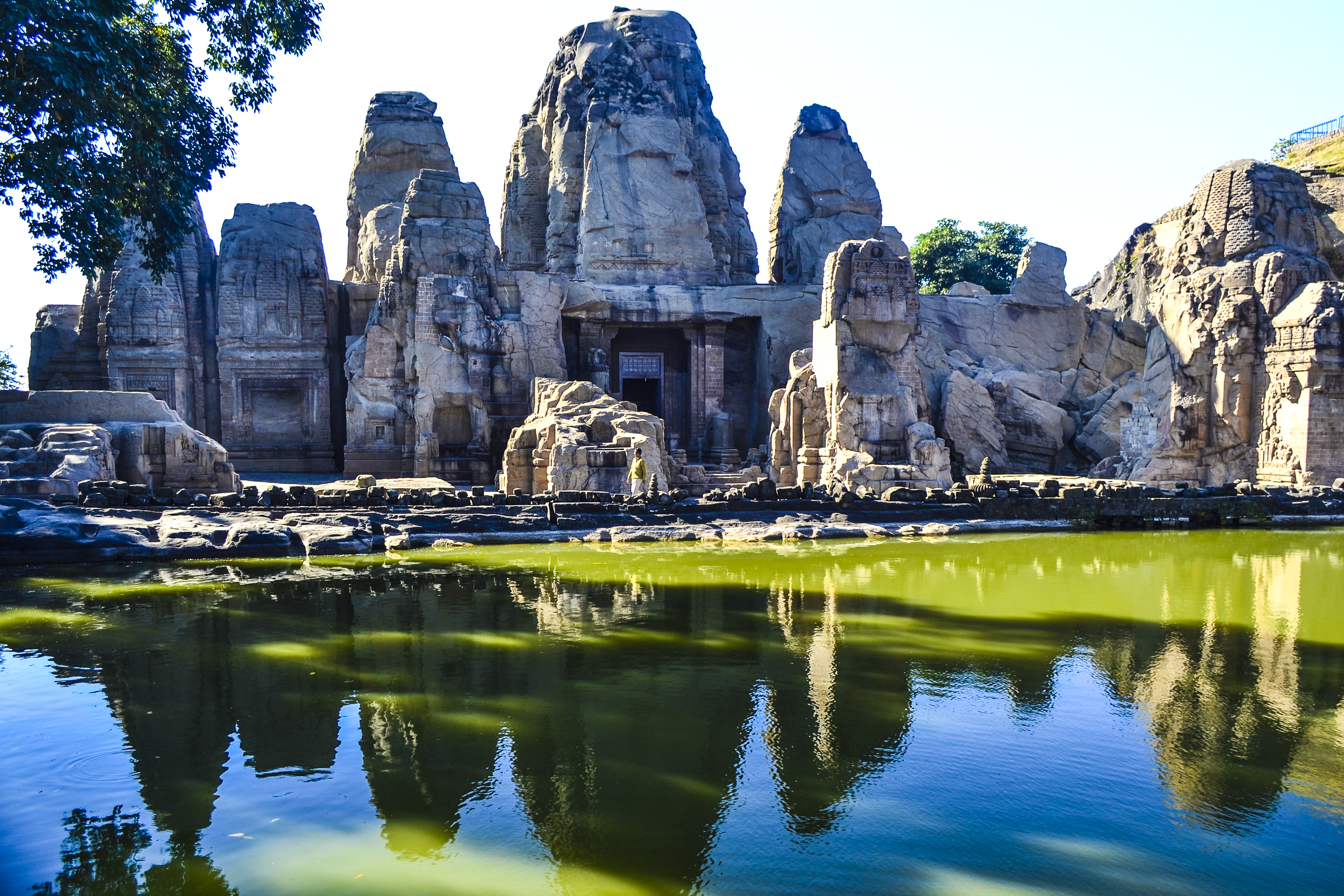
8th century rock cut temple at Masrur

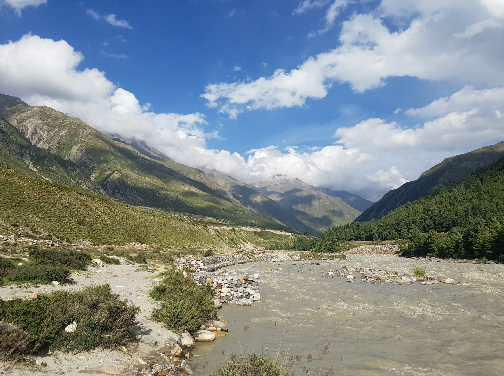
Chitkul is a small village at the end of Sangla valley in Kinnaur

== Statistics ==
=== Domestic tourism ===
Domestic tourism in Himachal Pradesh has seen significant fluctuations over the past few years.

Domestic tourist arrivals in Himachal(2018–2024)
Year	Arrivals
2018	8,700,000
2019	8,857,000
2020	2,163,000
2021	1,973,000
2022	15,000,000
2023	15,900,000
2024	18,000,000

=== Foreign tourism ===
Himachal Pradesh, a state in northern India known for its scenery and culture, attracts tourists from all over the world.

Foreign tourist arrivals in Himachal(2013–2024)
Year	Arrivals
2013	400,000
2014	400,000
2015	400,000
2016	400,000
2017	400,000
2018	200,000
2019	200,000
2020	41,803
2021	5,000
2022	29,000
2023	63,000
2024	83,000
