= Raison =

Raison may refer to:

== People ==
- Raison (surname)

== Other uses ==
- Raison, Himachal Pradesh, India
- Raison (cigarette), a South Korean cigarette brand

== See also ==
- Raisin (disambiguation)
- Raison d'état or national interest
- Raison d'être (disambiguation)
