= Jwalamukhi =

Jwalamukhi may refer to:

- Jwalamukhi (poet) (1938–2008), Indian poet, novelist, writer and political activist
- Jwalamukhi (1980 film), an Indian Hindi-language film
- Jwalamukhi (2000 film), an Indian Hindi-language film
- Jwaalamukhi, a 1985 Indian Kannada-language film

== See also ==
- Jawalamukhi, Himachal Pradesh, India
  - Jawalamukhi Assembly constituency
  - Jwalamukhi temple, Himachal Pradesh
