= Kullu Manali Circuit =

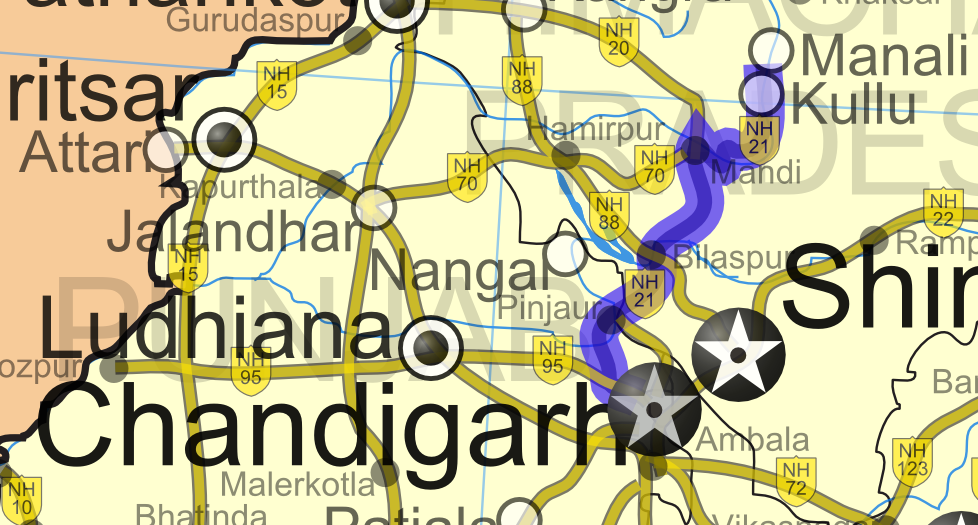
National Highway 21

The Kullu Manali Circuit is a tourist route in India. The initial entry point to Kullu Manali Circuit is from Chandigarh, India. Most of the stopovers and destinations lies on the National Highway No. 21. This highway originates from Chandigarh and ends at Manali. This path from Chandigarh to Manali followed by National Highway No 21. The circuit is categorised into 4 main segments:-

- Sutlej Trail
- Beas Trail
- Kullu Valley Trail
- Across Rohtang Pass

| Trails | Destinations |
|---|---|
| Sutlej Trail | Swarghat, Bilaspur, Deothsidh |
| Beas Trail | Mandi, Rewalsar, Jogindernagar |
| Kullu Valley Trail | Kullu, Raison, Nagar, Manali |
| Across the Rohtang Pass | Keylong, Lahul and Spiti |

== Picture gallery ==
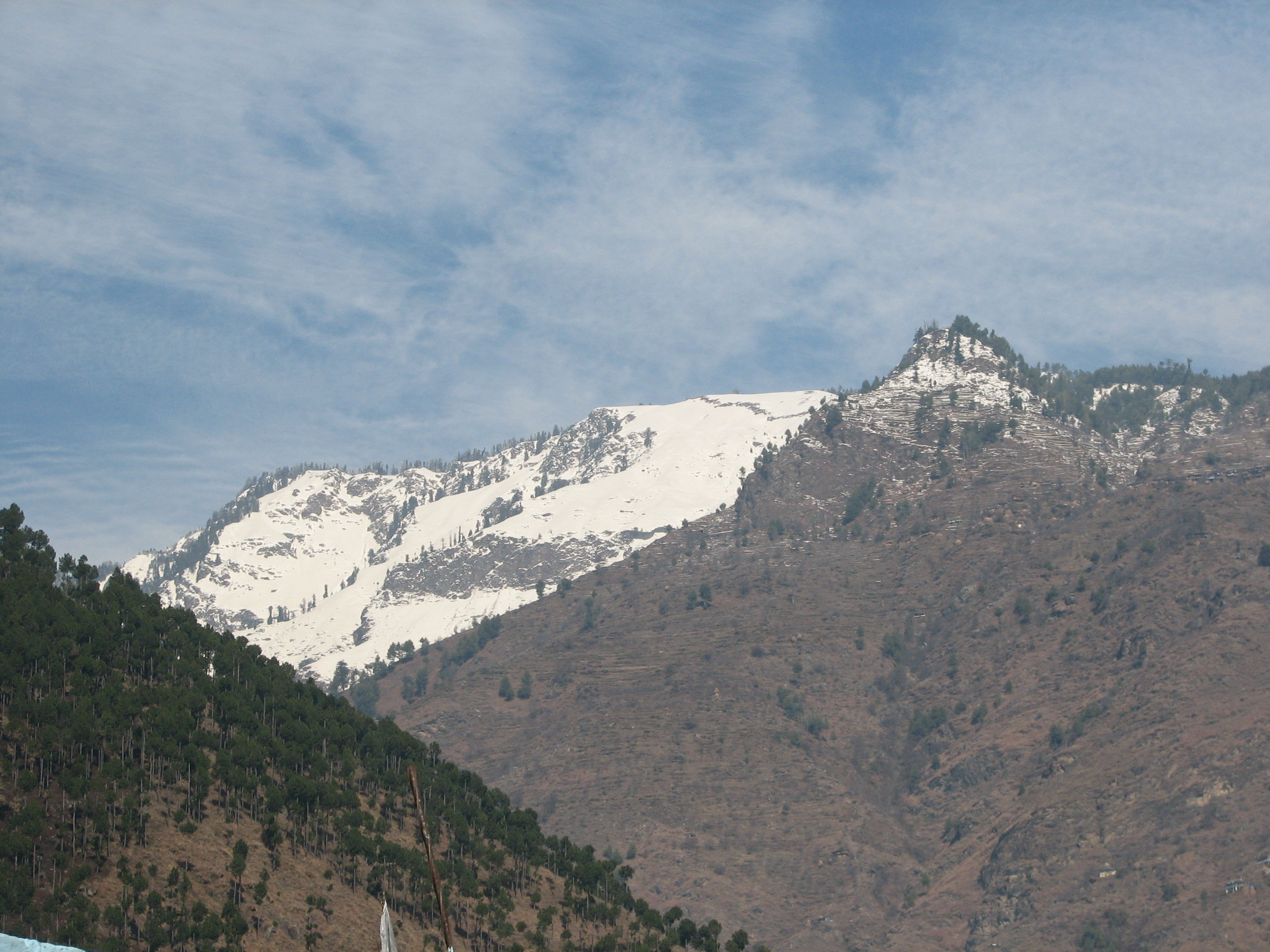
Lug valley

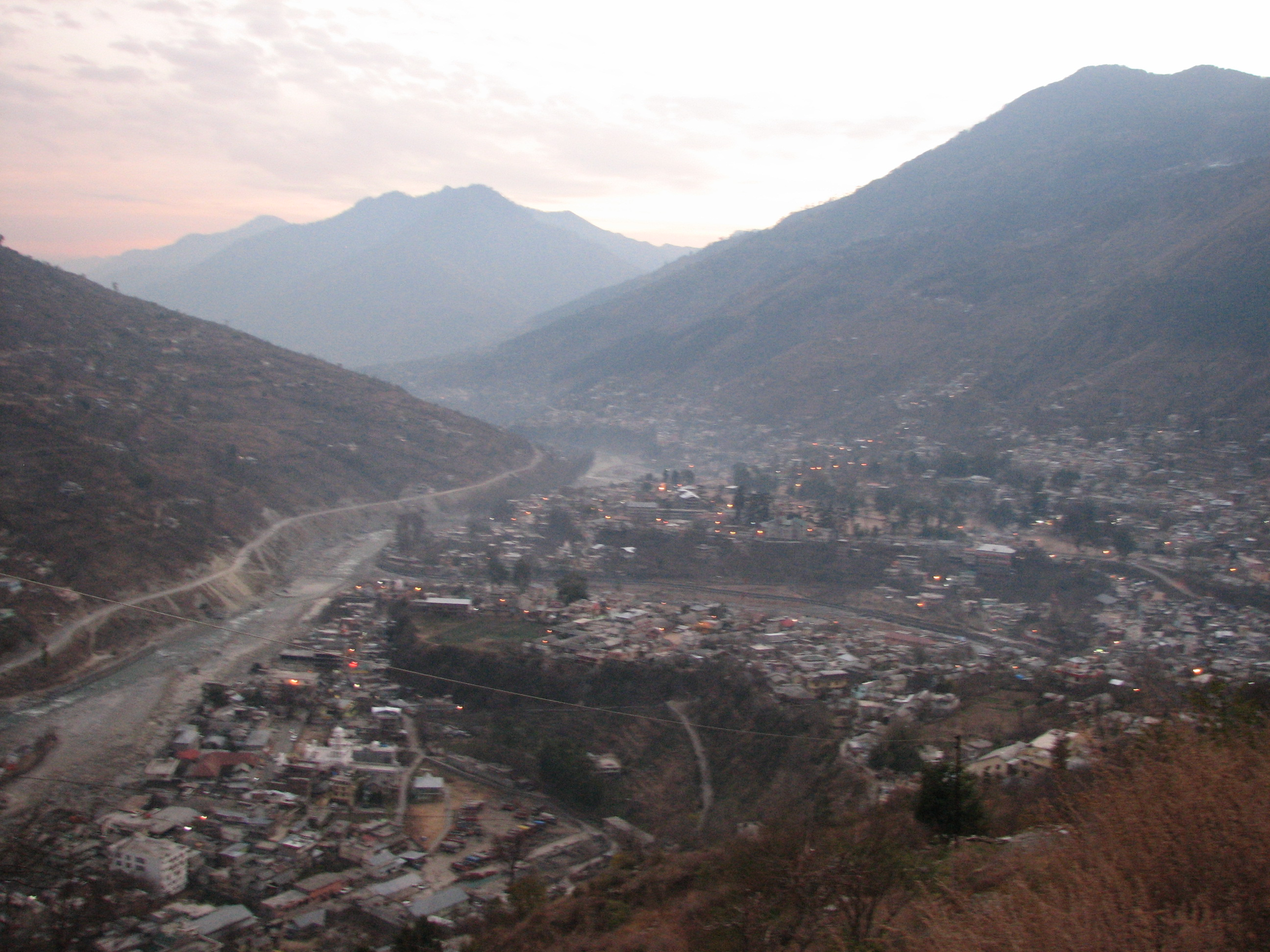
Kullu as seen from Bhekhli village

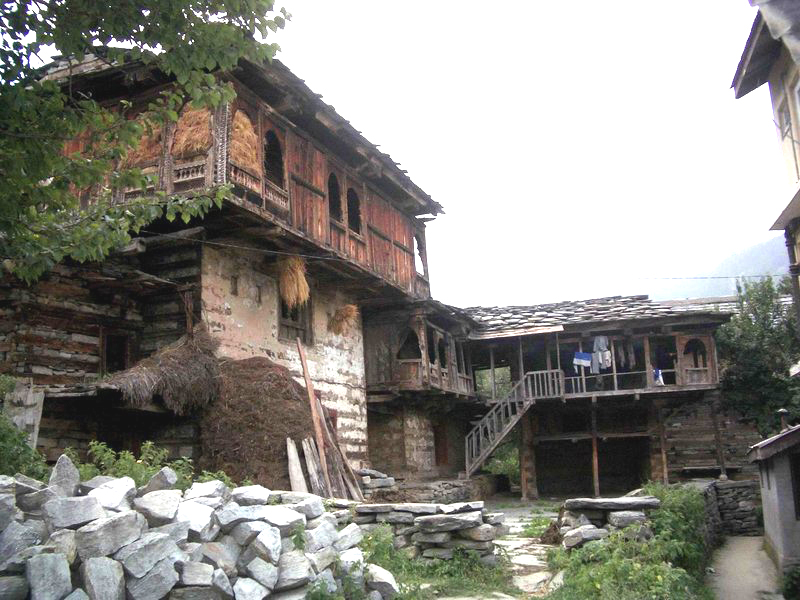
Traditional home, Manali, 2004

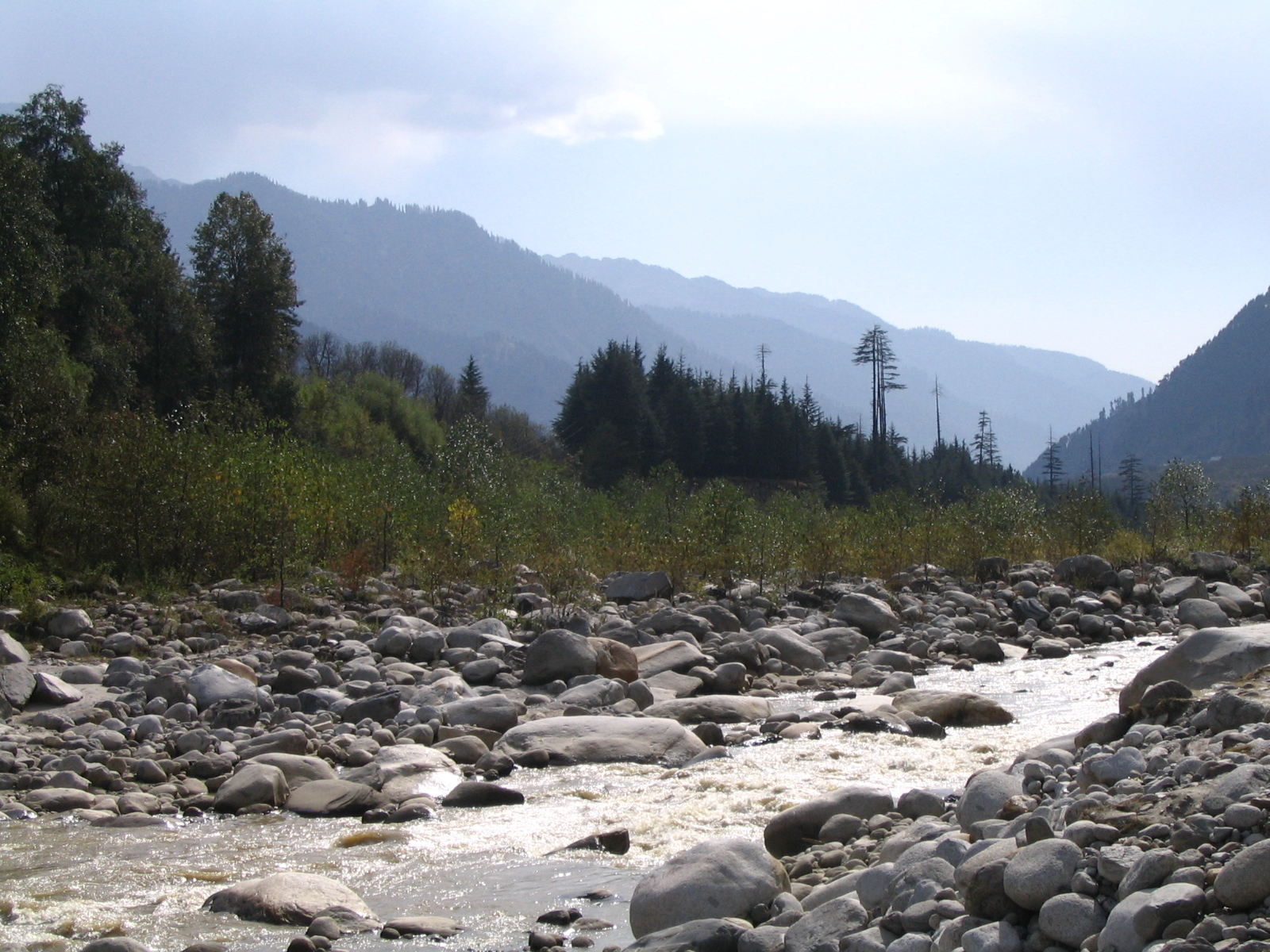
River Beas and mountains as seen from Va

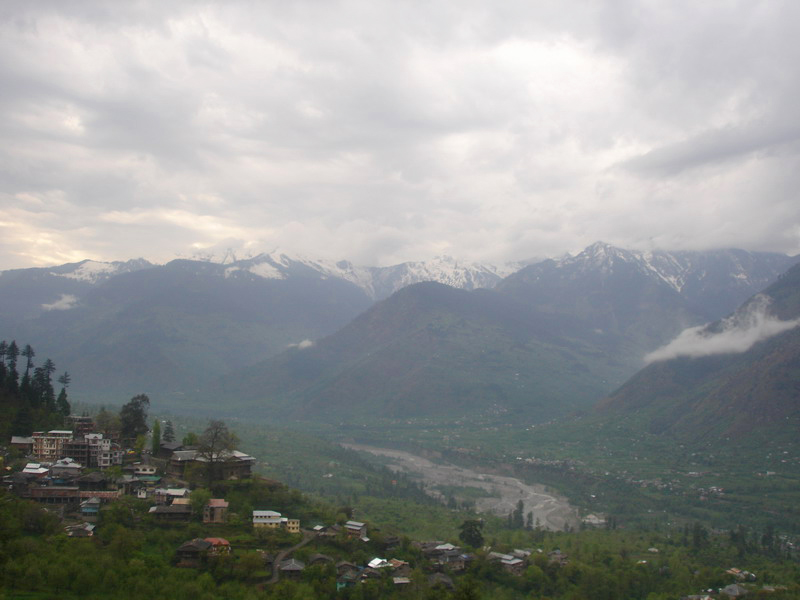
Mountain ranges in Manali

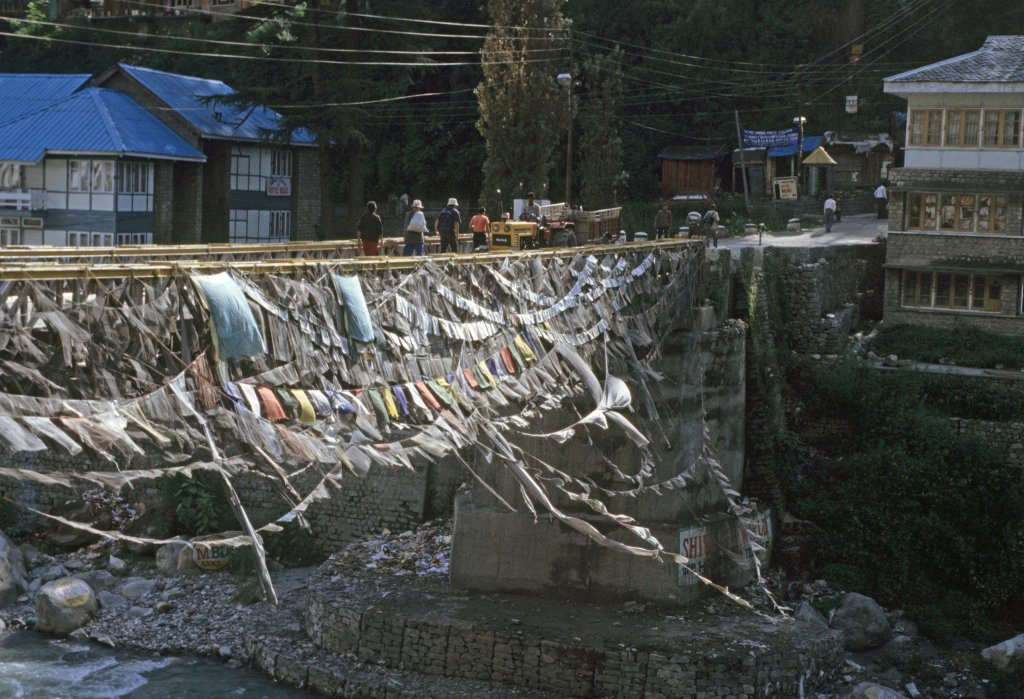
Bridge in the middle of town with prayer flags

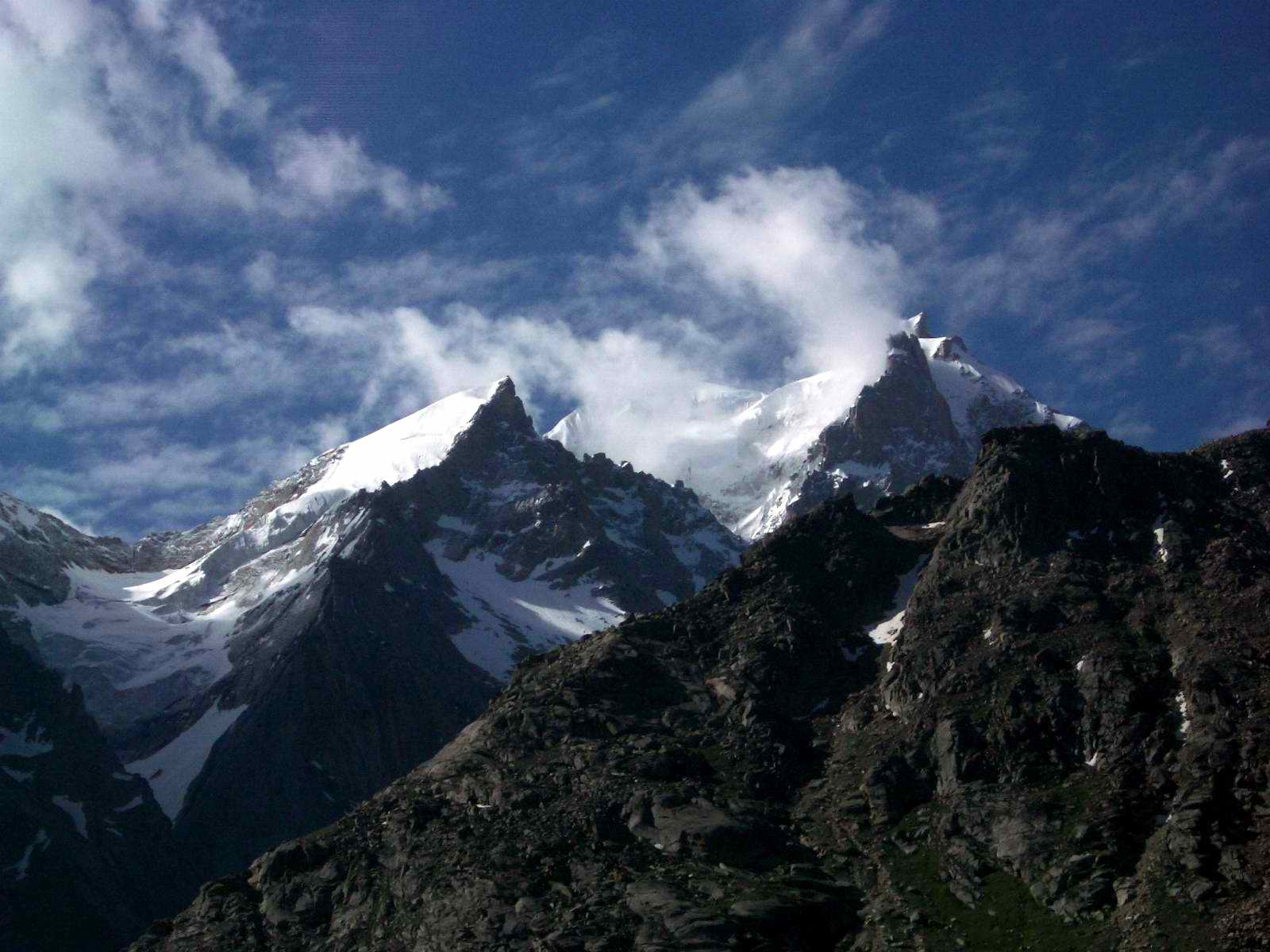
Mountain peaks, Lahul

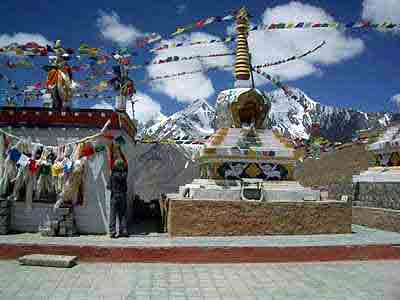
Kunzum Pass between Lahul & Spiti

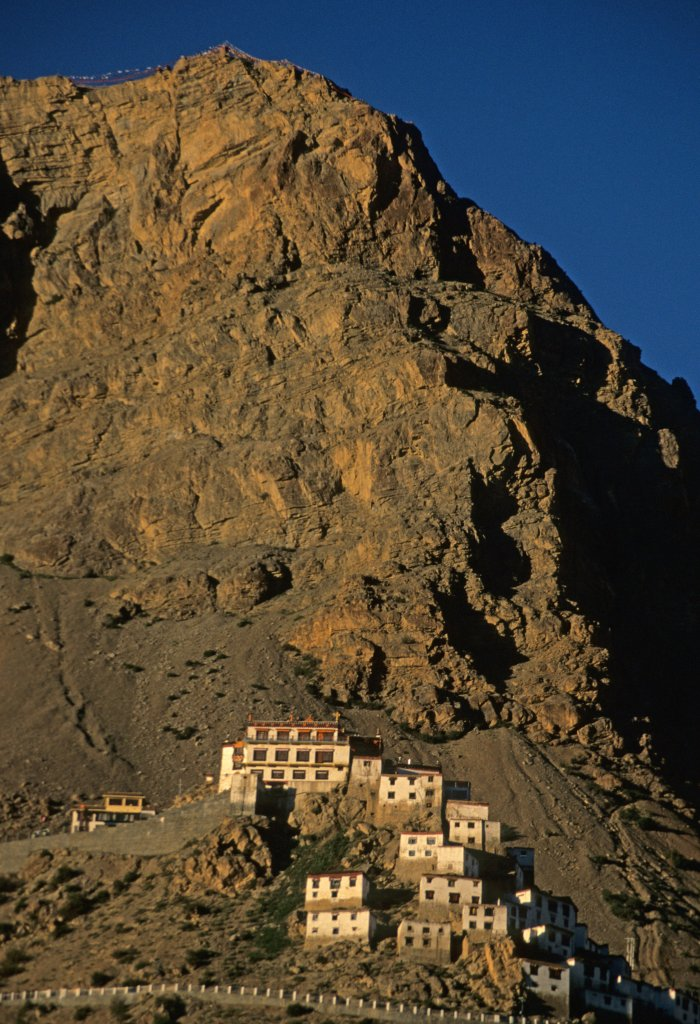
Ki Gompa

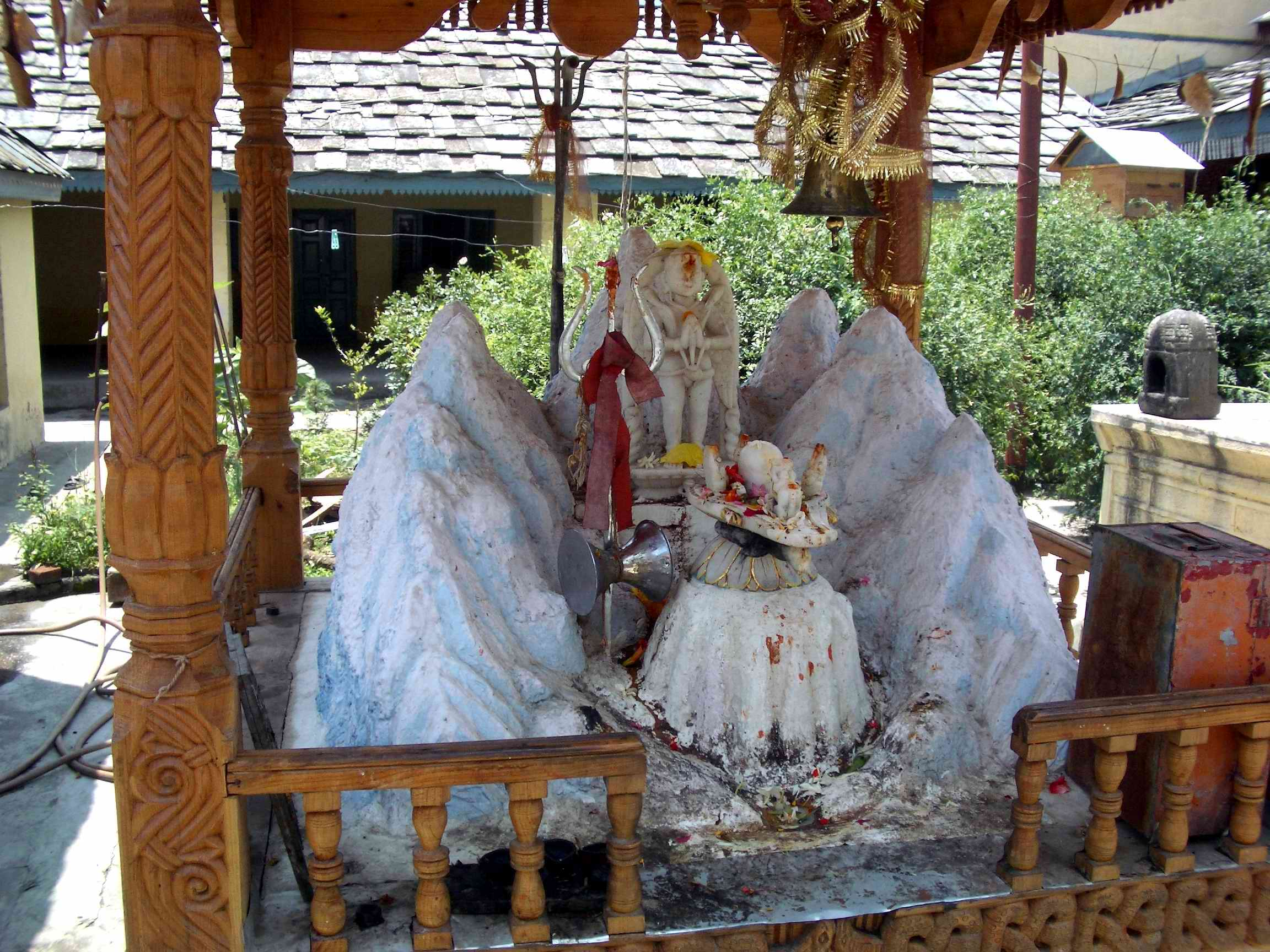
Shiva shrine, Kullu

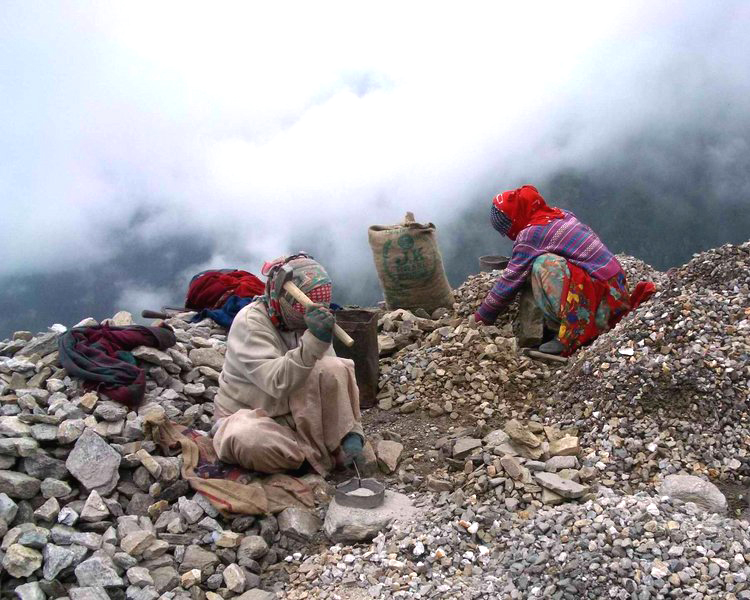
Road workers crushing rocks, Kullu

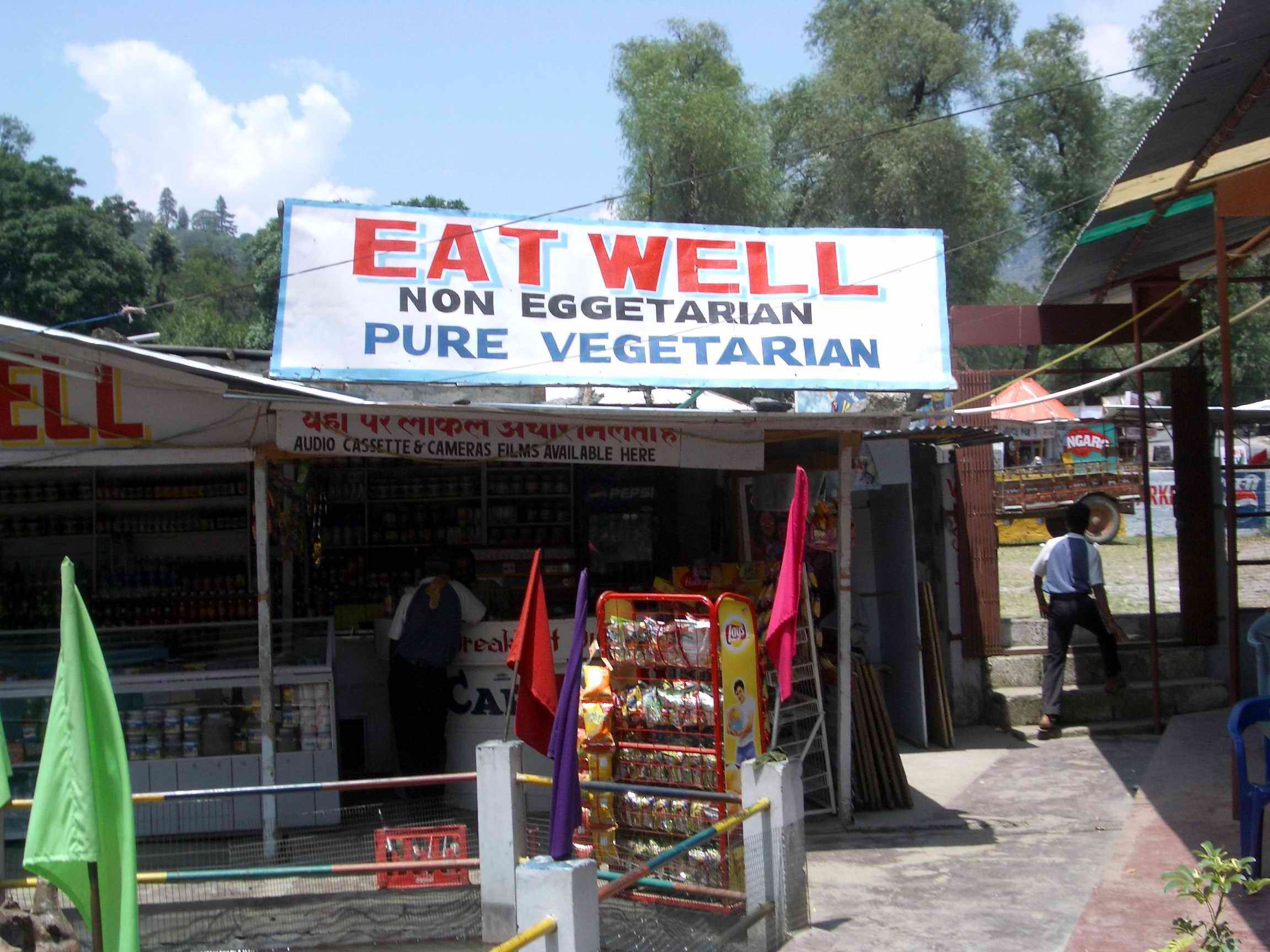
Roadside restaurant, Kullu

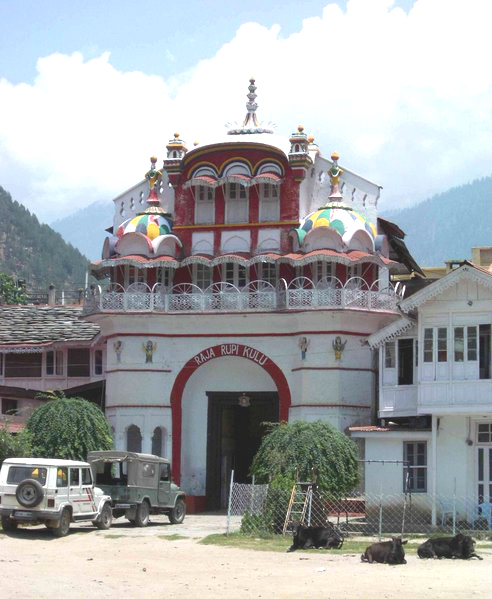
Raja Rupi Kulu Palace
