= Deothsidh =

Deotsidh
- Pilgrimage town
- Location in Himachal Pradesh, India Deotsidh (India)
- Coordinates: 31.4551214°N 76.541099°E
- Country: India
- State: Himachal Pradesh
- District: Hamirpur district

Government
  - Body: Panchayat

Area
  - Total: 1,118 km^{2} (432 sq mi)

Population (2011)
  - Total: 17,252
  - Density: 15.43/km^{2} (39.97/sq mi)

Languages
  - Official: Hindi
  - Native: Pahari
- Time zone: UTC+5:30 (IST)
- PIN: 174047
- Telephone code: 1972
- Vehicle registration: HP-21
- Nearest city: Shah Talai
- Sex ratio: 850 ♂/♀
- Literacy: 89.0%
- Lok Sabha constituency: Lok Sabha constituency
- Vidhan Sabha constituency: Hamirpur Assembly Constituency
- Civic agency: Panchayat
- Climate: Cool (Köppen)

The place of Sidh Baba Balak Nath's gufa Deotsidh is a pilgrimage town in Barsar tehsil, Hamirpur district, Himachal Pradesh, India. The nearest broad gauge railway station is in Una district, about 60 kilometres (37 mi) distant, and the nearest airport is about 172 kilometres (107 mi) away in Chandigarh.

== Annual fair ==
Beginning on 14 March, which is in the Hindu month of Chaitra, an annual fair is organised at Deotsidh and attracts thousands of devotees from all over India and abroad. The fair commemorates Baba Balak Nath, an incarnation of Lord Shiva in Kali Yuga.

== General information ==
The Shrine - Baba Balak Nath Trust is the Overall Authority to Look After the Temple And Local Premises including the Library, Langar and Sarai. The Main Gufa is Located in the south of the Hilltop which is strictly banned for physical visit for women devotees. However, the women in a different Queue are allowed to have Darshans from a platform located some 5 Metre ahead of the Samadhi Place. Many pilgrims prefer to walk uphill from nearly Shrine of Shahtalai chanting hymns and Bhajans, performing strict religious exercises.

Local Police are deployed in numbers when there is a seasonal rush of Pilgrims majority of which arrive from Punjab and neighbouring states. Apart from the Main Shrine, there are Permanent and seasonal novelty shops located in Deotsidh operated mostly by the local residents. During the peak Season of Melas There are number of food stalls and cool water points are installed by pilgrims serving the traffic and by passersby. The cleanliness drive and open littering becomes a regular drive during such times.

== Climate ==
Deotsidh is situated at an average elevation of 1110 M above sea level in the Mid Shivalik Ranges Of The Outer Himalayas and Experience varying climates throughout the year ranging from Cool Winters ( Mid October to Mid April ) with Maximum Day Temperatures going as high as 20 °C with record low of -3 °C . Summers ( Mid April to Mid July ) are often moderate with Hotter days and pleasant nights at 37 °C to 17 °C, Monsoons lasts from Mid July to early September with Fair amount of Rainfall . Due to its geographical Location, Pine Forests are spread in large number . The last recorded snowfall occurred on 7 January 2012

Landscape

Deotsidh, as it is located in the Central Shivalik ranges at a sea level height of above 1000 meters presents a complete 360° panoramic view of far south Naina Devi and Bhakra Dam, lowlands Of Western Una and Hamirpur District. The far northern views of the Dhauladhar Himalayan ranges, the hills of Mandi District and some of the regions of Jalori Pass, the lower hills of Solan and the Hill Of Bahadurpur and Swarghat of Bilaspur District.

== Attractions ==
The village is a part of a pilgrimage circuit that includes the Chintpurni, Bajreshwarji Mandir, Jwala Ji and Chamunda Devi temples. The village has a Deotsidh temple dedicated to Baba Balak Nath, from the top of which can be seen Bhakhra Dam, one of the largest dams in the world.
