= Allium negianum =

Scientific classification
- Kingdom: Plantae
- Clade: Tracheophytes
- Clade: Angiosperms
- Clade: Monocots
- Order: Asparagales
- Family: Amaryllidaceae
- Subfamily: Allioideae
- Genus: Allium
- Species: A. negianum

Binomial name
- Allium negianum A.Pandey, K.M.Rai, Malav & S.Rajkumar

Species of flowering plant

Allium negianum is a species of Allium discovered in 2021 in India. It is found in the western Himalayas, in the Indian districts of Pithoragarh and Chamoli, in the state of Uttarakhand, between 3,000 and 4,800 meters above sea level. It was cultivated in the region for years before it was officially identified.

A. negianum was named after Kuldeep Singh Negi, who was an Allium collector.
