= Shri Chamunda Devi Mandir =

Hindu temple in Himachal Pradesh, India

Shri Chamunda Devi Temple
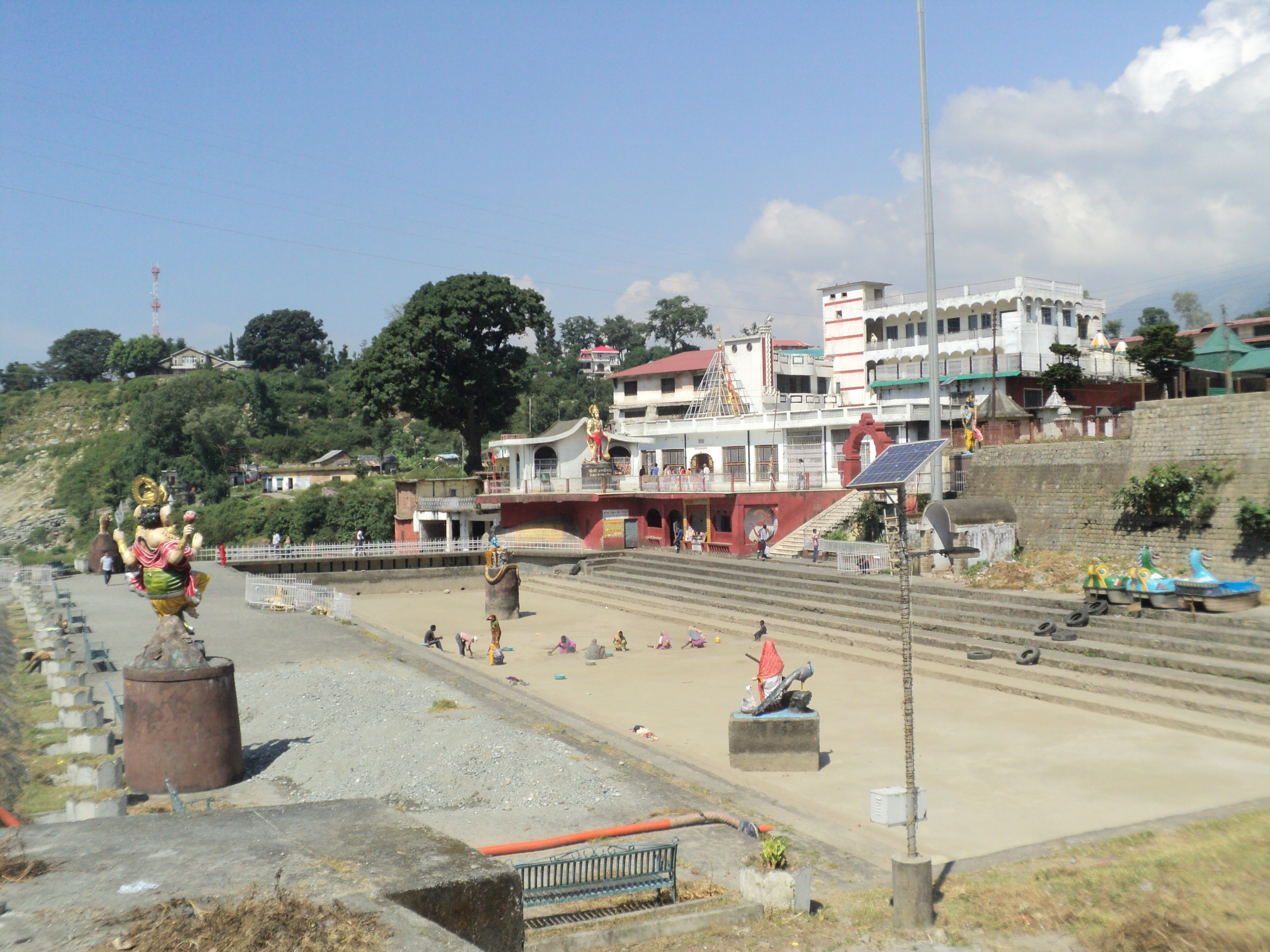
- Complete front view of the temple

- Location within Himachal Pradesh Location within India

Religion
- Affiliation: Hinduism
- District: Kangra
- Deity: Shri Chamunda Devi
- Festival: Navratri

Location
- Location: Padar, Dharamshala
- State: Himachal Pradesh
- Country: India
- Coordinates: 32°8′54″N 76°25′9″E

Shri Chamunda Devi Temple also known as Chamunda Nandikeshwar Dham is a Hindu temple dedicated to Shri Chamunda Devi, a form of Goddess Durga, located at 19 km away from Palampur town in Dharamshala Tehsil of Kangra district of the Northern Indian state of Himachal Pradesh. This is one of the most prominent temples in Himachal Pradesh and one of the most popular all over India. It is believed that whatever vow is prayed here manifests in reality.

The much older Aadi Himani Chamunda which is also the original shrine, is situated at the hilltop, making it difficult for pilgrims to reach. Thus, this temple was constructed around 400 years ago for the ease of the believers.

== Shakta pitha status ==
While the Chamunda Devi Temple holds immense religious significance in Himachal Pradesh, it is not listed among the 51 or 52 traditional Shakta pithas mentioned in Hindu scriptures such as the Kalika Purana and the Devi Bhagavata Purana. These classical Shakta pithas are associated with the legend of Goddess Sati, where parts of her body are believed to have fallen to earth.

Despite this, Chamunda Devi is deeply revered in the region and is commonly included among the five major Shakti temples of Himachal Pradesh, along with Chintpurni, Jwalamukhi, Brajeshwari (Kangra), and Naina Devi. This grouping is based on local traditions and pilgrimage circuits, rather than canonical texts.

== Legend ==
This ancient temple is said to have been constructed in the 16th century and has considerable spiritual legend attached to it. According to one folklore, a 16th Century king and a priest prayed to the goddess Chamunda, asking for her consent to shift the idol to a more accessible location. The legend suggests that the goddess appeared in the priest's dream and suggested him the exact location from where the idol would be found. The king was informed of the same and his men recovered the ancient idol and installed it at the place where the temple is built now.

== Popularity ==
It is one of the most visited temples in India. The Chamunda Devi Temple remains a popular tourist attraction for those who visit Palampur. The temple attracts travelers from parts of India especially, not only because there are a lot of spiritual legends attached to it, but also because of the temples long history and its exhibition of Himachali architecture. The ancient idol of Shri Chamunda Devi is a common subject of interest among travelers, photographers, and devotees alike. Apart from the tourism who visit the Chamunda Devi Temple, the local residents of the hill town consider it one of the holiest places of worship in the area, especially because of its many legends and history that are attached to it. These residents and other devotees from the neighboring hill towns visit this temple in order to offer their prayers to the goddess.

A small temple named Jakhni Mata Mandir is situated on a hilltop that overlooks the valley. It is accessible by a short mountain drive.

== Access ==
=== Road ===
The temple is located in the village of Chandreshwar, approximately 15 km from Dharamshala and 10 km from Kangra, along the Dharamshala–Palampur road (State Highway 17). It is served by both Himachal Road Transport Corporation (HRTC) and private buses, taxis, and autos connecting Dharamshala, Palampur, Kangra, and nearby towns.

=== Rail ===
The nearest railway station is Kangra station, about 14 km from the temple, on the narrow-gauge Kangra Valley Railway line between Pathankot and Joginder Nagar, with regular daily service. For broad-gauge travelers, Pathankot Junction (PTK) is approximately 90 km away.

=== Air ===
The nearest airport is Kangra Airport (Gaggal Airport, IATA: DHM), roughly 25 km from the temple, with daily flights to New Delhi and Chandigarh. Taxis and buses are available for onward travel.

== See also ==
- Shakta pithas
- Jwalamukhi Temple
- Bajreshwari Mata Temple
- Chintpurni Temple
