= Chakmoh =

Village in Himachal Pradesh, India

Chakmoh is a village in Hamirpur district of Himachal Pradesh, India. It is surrounded by the thick forests having various types of trees mostly Cheed. Baba Balak Nath Temple Deotsidh is also situated here. A lot of devotees come here every year to worship Baba Balak Nath. The village is well connected with roads and have the facilities of electricity and water. The village has a long history and a population of approximately 2000 people. There are two colleges, both of which are affiliated to Himachal Pradesh University Shimla.:

- B.B.N.P.G. College Chakmoh having Science, Arts and Commerce stream and also Master classes for Sanskrit and Hindi subjects.
- Shri. Vishav Nath Sanskrit College Chakmoh offering a graduate degree in Sanskrit language.

There is also one Senior Secondary School and two Government Primary schools for education.
