= Baba Balak Nath =

Figure in Hindu mythology

- Devanagari: बाबा बालक नाथ
- Affiliation: Brahman (Nath), (Siddha) Deva
- Abode: Deotsidh, Gufa- Baba Balak Nath, Hamirpur District, Himachal Pradesh, India
- Mantra: हरि ॐ श्री सिद्धाए नमः (Hari Om Shri Siddhaye Namah)
- Mount: Peacock
- Festivals: Chet Mahina, Chaitra- Mela
- Parents: Sh. Vishnu (father), Smt. Lakshami (mother)

Baba Balak Nath is a Hindu deity, who is worshiped in the North-Indian state of Himachal Pradesh and Punjab. Their main temple, known as Deotsidh, is in a cave on the hilltop of Chakmoh village in Hamirpur, Himachal Pradesh.

== Early life ==
Baba Balak Nath was born in the house of a Gaur Brahmin at Girnar Parbat, a famous place of pilgrimage for the sect of fakirs in Kathiawar. Baba Balak Nath, Deotsidh is very popular deity in the north region of India specially Himachal Pradesh, Punjab, Delhi & Haryana. Every year in Chaitra māsa people come from different states and even from abroad such as Canada, UK, USA to the main temple situated in Deot Sidh, Himachal Pradesh seeking blessing from the deity. It is said that who so ever visit the temple at this time gets all wishes fulfilled by Lord.

== Notable Indian films on the deity include ==
- Shiv Bhakat Baba Balak Nath (1972) by Avatar
- Jai Baba Balak Nath (1981) by Satish Bhakri.
