= Aadi Himani Chamunda =

Hindu temple in Himachal Pradesh, India

Coordinates: 32.1927°N 76.4506°E

- आदि हिमानी चामुँडा
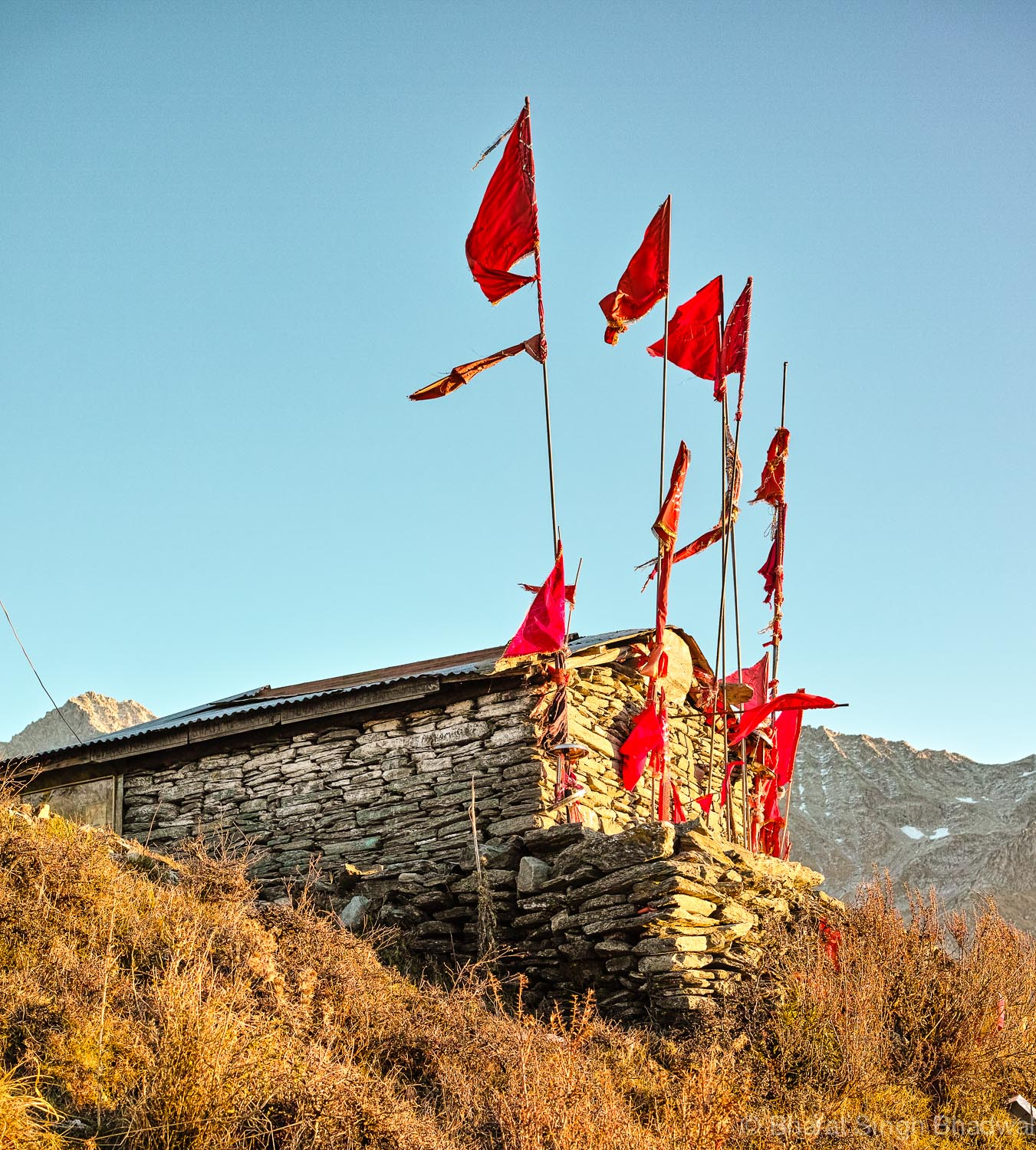
- Aadi Himani Chamunda temple as viewed against the backdrop of the Dhauladhar mountains. This is a makeshift temple after the original temple was burnt by lightning in February 2014

Religion
- Affiliation: Hinduism
- Deity: Shri Chamunda Devi
- Festival: Navratri

Location
- Location: Chandar Bhan, Jia, Kangra
- State: Himachal Pradesh
- Country: India
- Interactive map of Aadi Himani Chamunda

Aadi Himani Chamunda is a Hindu temple dedicated to Shri Chamunda Devi, situated in Chandar Bhan, Jia in Kangra Valley, Himachal Pradesh, India, in the Himalayas.

== History ==
The temple stands close to the ruins of the palace of Raja Chandar Bhan Chand Katoch (d. 1660), and is of least the same age, if not far older. Until 1992 the temple was also derelict but has been restored, in very large measure as a result of the dedication and hard work of one man, Mr. P. D. Saini, a retired Class 1 officer, who worked on its restoration for 20 years after his retirement, with the assistance of a group of devotees. He continues (as of 2013) to devote himself to the improvement of the temple even after its administration was taken on by the government.

The temple environs are of outstanding natural beauty and for that reason a destination for trekkers. Aadi Himani Chamunda Temple (3185 meters) is located on a hilltop North East to the existing Shri Chamunda Devi Mandir in Kangra District of Himachal Pradesh. One can reach there after hiking about 13 Kilometers from Dharamshala Palampur state Highway (Jadrangal Village) and approximate lay 13 Kilometers from the last motor able road at Kand Kardiana village.

The trek to Aadi Himani Chamunda Devi requires about 6–7 hours and moderate expertise is required. Devotees visit the sacred shrine throughout the year except winters. As per locals goddess Shri Chamunda Devi killed two demons Chand and Mund from the top of the mountain by throwing huge boulders on them, one can still find one of the boulder above the Shiva Temple located near existing Shri Chamunda Devi Temple on Dharamshala Palampur state highway.

The recent temple build in past decade was destroyed by the fierce fire in 2014 and now it has been under reconstruction again by the help of devotees and Temple Trust. There is no water available en route to mandir.

== Dedication and worship ==
Shri Chamunda Devi (Sanskrit: चामुण्डा, Cāmuṇḍā), also known as Chamundi, Chamundeshwari and Charchika, is a fearsome aspect of Devi, the Hindu Divine Mother and one of the seven Matrikas (mother goddesses). She is also one of the chief Yoginis, a group of sixty-four or eighty-one Tantric goddesses, who are attendants of the warrior goddess Durga. The name is a combination of Chanda and Munda, two monsters whom Chamunda killed. She is closely associated with Kali, another fierce aspect of Devi. She is sometimes identified with goddesses Parvati, Chandi or Durga as well. The goddess is often portrayed as haunting cremation grounds or fig trees. The goddess is worshipped by ritual animal sacrifices along with offerings of wine and in the ancient times, human sacrifices were offered too. Originally a tribal goddess, Chamunda was assimilated in Hinduism and later entered the Jain pantheon too, although in Jainism, the rites of her worship include vegetarian offerings, and not the meat and liquor offerings.

Ramakrishna Gopal Bhandarkar says that Chamunda was originally an indigenous goddess worshipped by the tribal peoples of the Vindhya Range of central India. These tribes were known to offer goddesses animal as well as human sacrifices along with ritual offerings of liquor. These methods of worship were retained in Tantric worship of Chamunda, after assimilation in Hinduism. He proposes that the fierce nature of this goddess is due to her association with Vedic Rudra (identified as Shiva in modern Hinduism), identified with fire god Agni at times. Wangu also backs the theory of the tribal origins of the goddess.

== See also ==
- Shri Chamunda Devi Mandir
- Jwala Ji Mandir
- Chintpurni Mata Mandir

== Sources ==
- Durga: Avenging Goddess, Nurturing Mother, ch.3: "Chamunda". Norton Simon Museum
- Babb, Lawrence A. (2004): Alchemies of Violence: Myths of Identity and the Life of Trade in Western India (pp. 168–9, 177–178) ISBN 0-7619-3223-2
- Kinsley, David (1988): Hindu Goddesses: Vision of the Divine Feminine in the Hindu Religious Traditions. University of California Press ISBN 0-520-06339-2
- Moor, Edward (1999): The Hindu Pantheon (first published 1810). Asian Educational Services ISBN 81-206-0237-4
- Singh, Narendra (2001): Encyclopaedia of Jainism. Anmol Publications PVT Ltd ISBN 81-261-0691-3
- Wangu, Madhu Bazaz (2003): Images of Indian Goddesses. Abhinav Publications (280 pages) ISBN 81-7017-416-3
