= Raison (surname) =

Raison is a surname, and may refer to:

- André Raison (c.1640–1719), French baroque composer and organist
- Charles Raison (born 1957), American psychiatrist
- Herbert Raison (1889–1952), Anglican priest
- Kate Raison (born 1962), Australian actress
- Max Raison (1901–1988), English cricketer
- Michel Raison (born 1949), French politician
- Milton Raison (1903–1982), American screenwriter
- Miranda Raison (born 1977), English actress
- Paul Raison (art historian), British authority on Old Master paintings
- Paul Raison (athlete) (born 1977), Australian paralympic
- Timothy Raison (1929–2011), British politician
