= Raison d'être =

Raison d'être /ˌreɪzɒ̃ ˈdɛtrə/ is a French expression commonly used in English, meaning "reason for being" or "reason to be."

Raison d'être may refer to:

== Music ==
=== Songs ===
- "Raison d'etre", by Asriel from the album Abyss
- "raison detre", by Japanese rock band Dir En Grey on the album Gauze
- "Raison d'etre", by Japanese rock band Nightmare used as opening theme of the anime Claymore
- "Raison d'etre", used as the ending theme of the Chobits anime by Japanese singer and voice actress Rie Tanaka
- "Raison d'etre", by British rock band Buzzcocks from the album A Different Kind of Tension
- "Raison d'etre～交差する宿命～", by Tomosuke Funaki under the alias Zektbach for the arcade game beatmania IIDX 17: Sirius
- "Raison d'etre~レーゾンデートル~", by Japanese singer Eve from the album Smile

=== Other uses in music ===
- Raison d'être (band), a Swedish dark-ambient-industrial-drone music project
- Raison D'être (album), by Australian jazz fusion guitarist Frank Gambale

== Other uses ==
- Raison d'être, an American Ale brewed by Dogfish Head
