= Raison, Himachal Pradesh =

Camping ground stopover in Himachal Pradesh, India

Coordinates: 32.054°N 77.132°E

Raison is a stopover which has vast camping grounds maintained by Himachal Pradesh Tourism.

== General information ==
Raison is a small cluster of villages on the banks of Beas river about 12 km north of Kullu town. It is famous for camping sites and starting point for white water rafting on Beas river. Recently a mineral water unit by "Catch" has been set up here. This place is also famous for rural centre of Rajendra Prasad National Ophthalmology Centre (AIIMS) where summer camps for various ophthalmological diseases are held every year.

- Type:- stopover.
- Climate:-In winters the temperature falls down to about 1-2 degree Celsius and summers are pleasant.
- Height:- 1435 m (4708 ft).

== Access ==
- Distance from Kullu:- 12 km. (on Manali highway).
- Distance from Manali:- 29 km.
- Distance from Delhi:- 575 km.
- Distance from Shimla:- 232 km.
- Nearest broad gauge railhead:- 292 km. (Chandigarh)
- Airport:- 22 km. (Kullu Airport)
