= Jwalamukhi temple, Himachal Pradesh =

Jwalamukhi temple
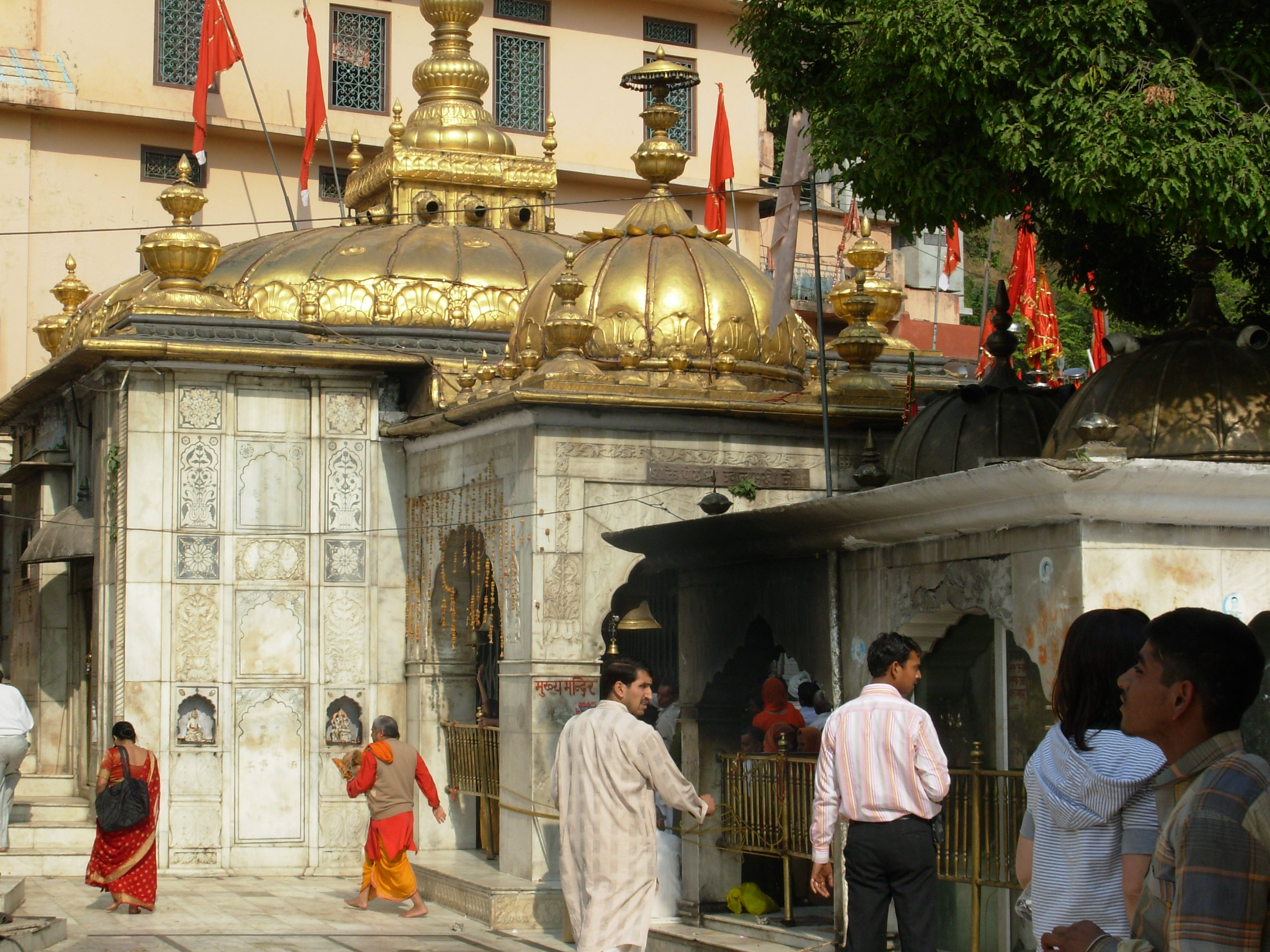
- Entrance to the temple

- Location in Himachal Pradesh Jwalamukhi temple, Himachal Pradesh (India)

Religion
- Affiliation: Hinduism
- District: Kangra
- Deity: Jwala Devi

Location
- Location: Jawalamukhi
- State: Himachal Pradesh
- Country: India
- Interactive map of Jwalamukhi temple
- Coordinates: 31.8752°N 76.3243°E

The Jwalamukhi (IAST: Jvālāmukhī) temple is a Hindu temple dedicated to the goddess Jwala Devi, located in the Jawalamukhi town of Himachal Pradesh, India. It is known for its eternal flame emanating from a rock fissure on top of which the main shrine has been built. It is considered one of the major Shakti pitha shrines.

== History ==
Around c. 650 CE, a Chinese envoy to India described a place where hot and cold water came out of calcareous rocks; Alexander Cunningham identifies this place as Jwalamukhi. While it is possible that a shrine existed at the place in c. 650, the original structure does not exist at the site.

Shams-i Siraj's Tarikh-i-Firuz-Shahi (14th century) is the earliest extant text to mention Jwalamukhi by name. It states that emperor Firuz Shah Tughlaq visited the place during a campaign against Kangra. The emperor's visit was apparently a result of curiosity, but it led to rumors that he held the local goddess in reverence. Shams-i-Siraj, based on a report from his father (who was part of the emperor's retinue), dismisses this as a false claim spread by "infidels", and assures his readers that the emperor was a devout Muslim who "held the idol in deepest detestation".

Abul Fazl (16th century) describes the place without naming it: he mentions "mountain lights resembling lamps", stating that several temples were built over such places. He considers the allegedly miraculous flame to be the natural effect of a sulfur mine. English traveller Thomas Coryat (1577-1617) mentions the place as "Jallamakee", and French traveler Jean de Thévenot (1633-1667) calls it "Calamac ".

== Architecture ==
The temple complex has a main temple built over a fissure that emits combustible natural gas, believed to be a manifestation of Devi. It is surrounded by small temples dedicated to various gods and goddesses. The devotees believe the fissure in the main temple to be the mouth of the goddess whose body is present in the Vajreshwari temple at Kangra. The temple building is of modern Muslim style, with a golden dome and pinnacles. A silver-plated folding door, donated by Kharak Singh, is part of the building. Some images have been placed in the temple relatively recently.
