= Bajreshwari Mata Temple, Kangra =

Hindu temple in Kangra, Himachal Pradesh, India dedicated to goddess Vajreshvari

Vajreshwari Temple
- Kangra Devi
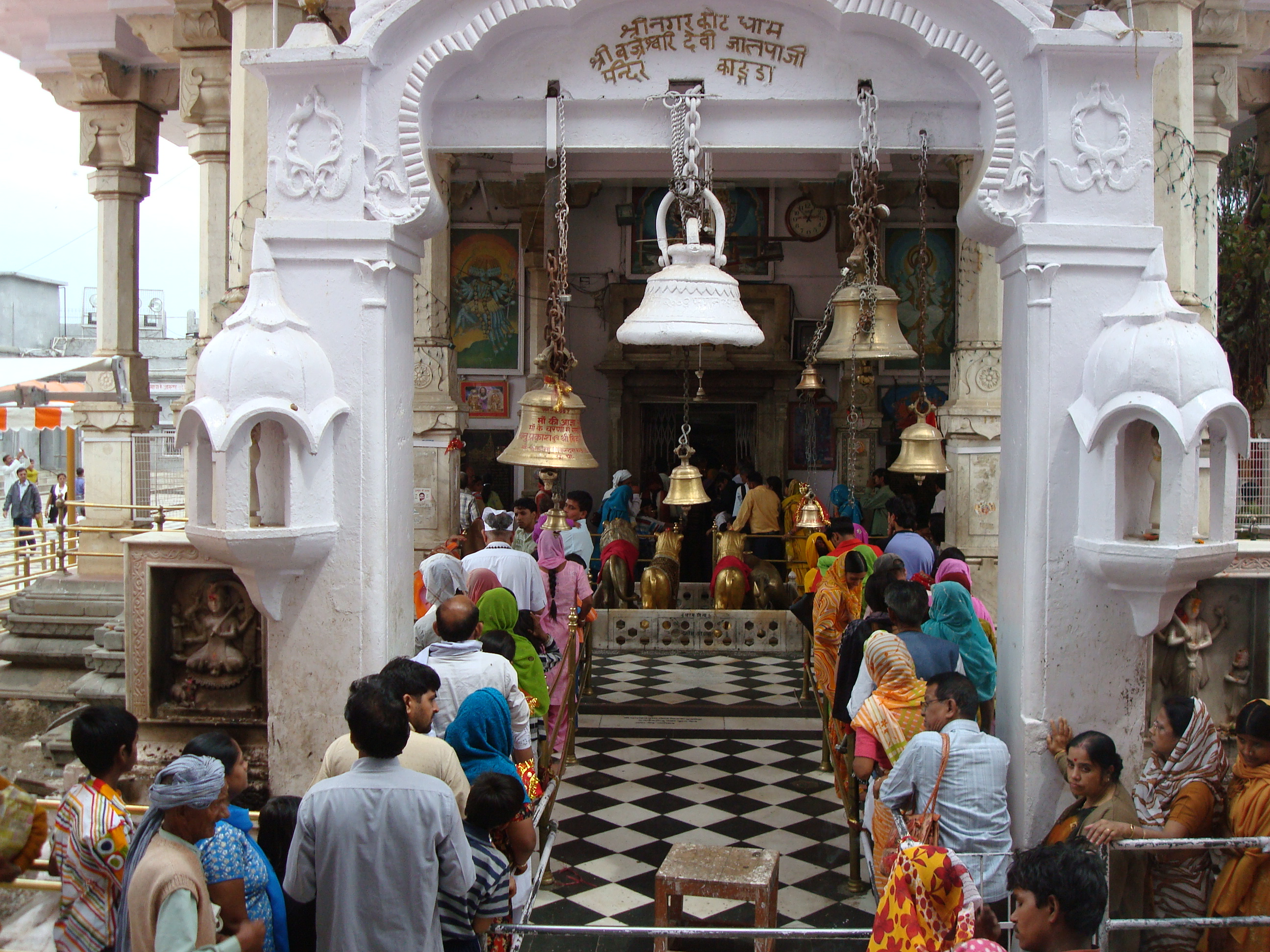
- Main entrance of the temple

- Location in Himachal Pradesh

Religion
- Affiliation: Hinduism
- District: Kangra district
- Deity: Durga
- Festival: Navratri

Location
- Location: Kangra, Kangra Devi
- State: Himachal Pradesh
- Country: India
- Coordinates: 32.10183°N 76.26987°E

Architecture
- Type: Hindu temple architecture
- Elevation: 738.33 m (2,422 ft)

The Vajreshwari Devi Temple, also known as Brajeshwari Devi Temple, Bajreshwari Mata Temple, or Kangra Devi Temple, is a Hindu temple in Kangra district, Himachal Pradesh, India. It is dedicated to Durga in her fierce form as Vajreshwari, the goddess of the thunderbolt. The temple is one of the 51 sacred Shakta pithas, where it is believed that the left breast of Sati fell to earth.

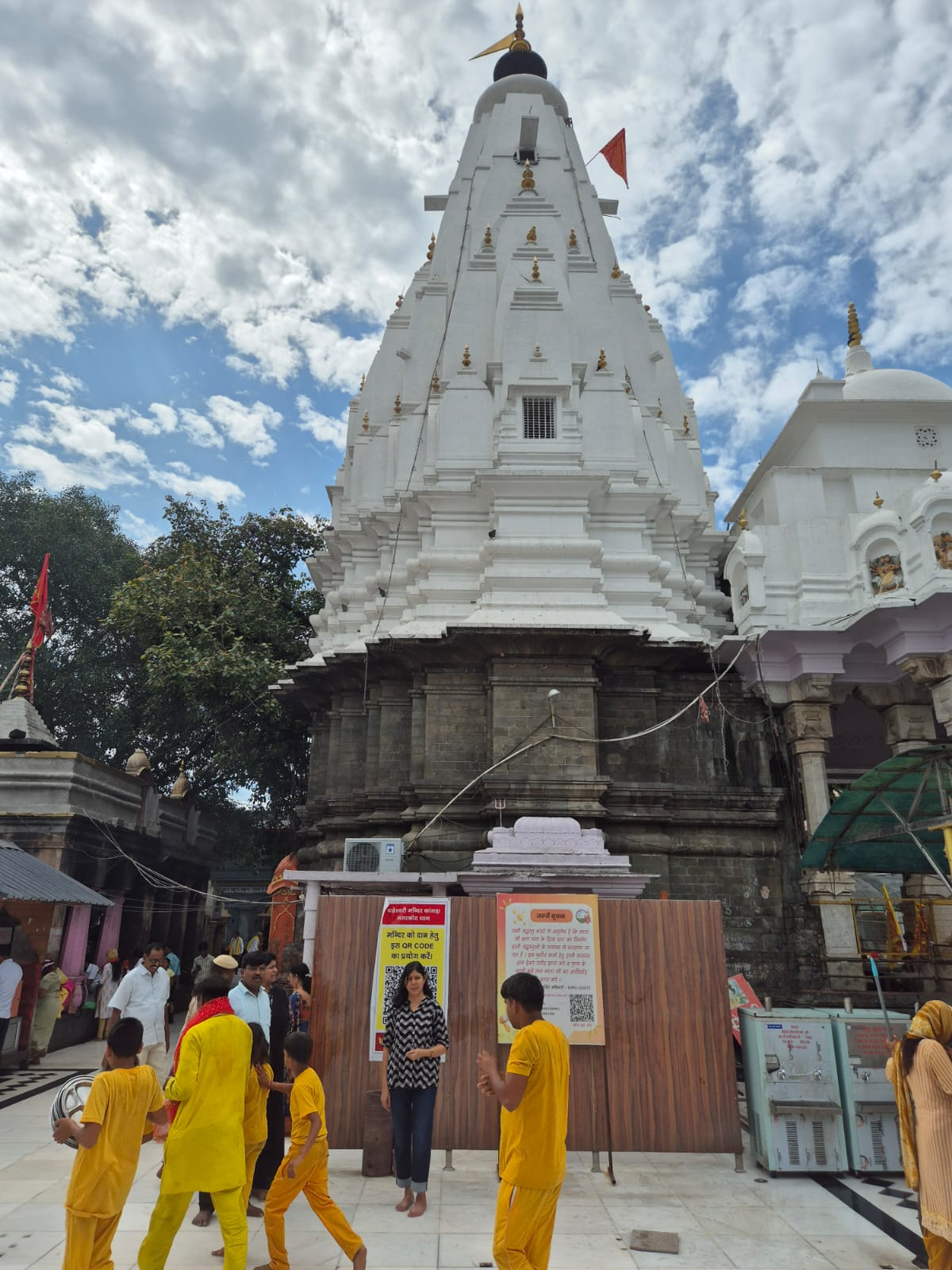
Vrajeshwari Kangra

The temple complex has several smaller temples dedicated to other Hindu deities. There is also a temple of Bhairava there.

The name Bajreshwari comes from the Sanskrit word Vajra meaning "thunderbolt" and Ishwari meaning "goddess". She is believed to be a form of Durga, who used a divine thunderbolt to slay the demon Kalikala. As per Shakta pitha legend, this site is where the left breast of Sati fell, making it a sacred location of divine feminine power.

== Sources ==
- Maa Vajreshvari Devi
