= Jawalamukhi =

- Town
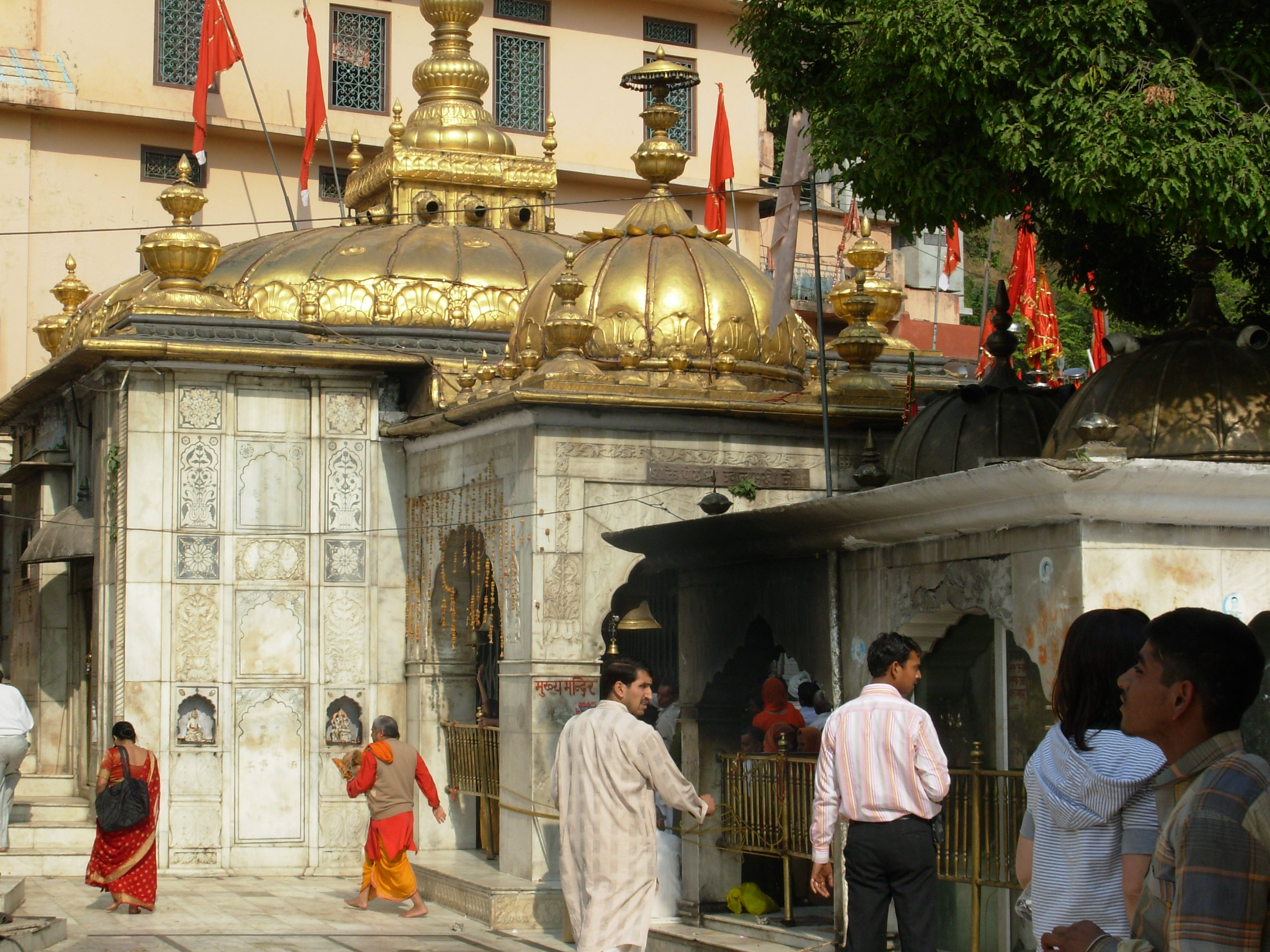
- Sri Jwalamukhi Devi Temple
- Nickname: Jawalaji
- Location in Himachal Pradesh, India Jawalamukhi (India)
- Coordinates: 31.8756100°N 76.3243500°E
- Country: India
- State: Himachal Pradesh
- District: Kangra
- Elevation: 557.66 m (1,829.6 ft)

Population (2011)
  - Total: 5,361

Languages
  - Official: Hindi
  - Native: Pahari
- Time zone: UTC+5:30 (IST)
- Vehicle registration: HP 83

Jawalamukhi, also known as Jwalamukhi or Jawala-ji, is a temple town and a nagar parishad in Kangra district in the Indian state of Himachal Pradesh. It is the location of the Jwalamukhi temple, which is known for a naturally burning flame emanating from a rock fissure, and recognized as one of the Shakta pithas.

== Geography ==
Jawalamukhi is located at 31.87561°N 76.32435°E. It has an average elevation of 610 metres (2,001 feet).

== Demographics ==
At the 2001 India census, Jawalamukhi had a population of 4931. Males constitute 52% of the population and females 48%.

== Census statistics ==
As of 2001 India census,

- Number of Households - 1,012
- Average Household Size (per Household) - 5.0
- Population-Total - 4,931
- Population-Urban - 4,931
- Proportion of Urban Population (%) - 100
- Population-Rural - 0
- Sex Ratio - 906
- Population (0-6 Years) - 608
- Sex Ratio (0-6 Year) - 961
- SC Population - 812
- Sex Ratio (SC) - 961
- Proportion of SC (%) - 16.0
- ST Population - 0
- Sex Ratio (ST) - 0
- Proportion of ST (%) - 0
- Literates - 3,777
- Illiterates - 1,154
- Literacy Rate (%)

== Genealogy registers ==
Hindu genealogy registers at Jawalamukhi are genealogy registers of pilgrims maintained there by pandas.
