= Western Himalayan subalpine conifer forests =

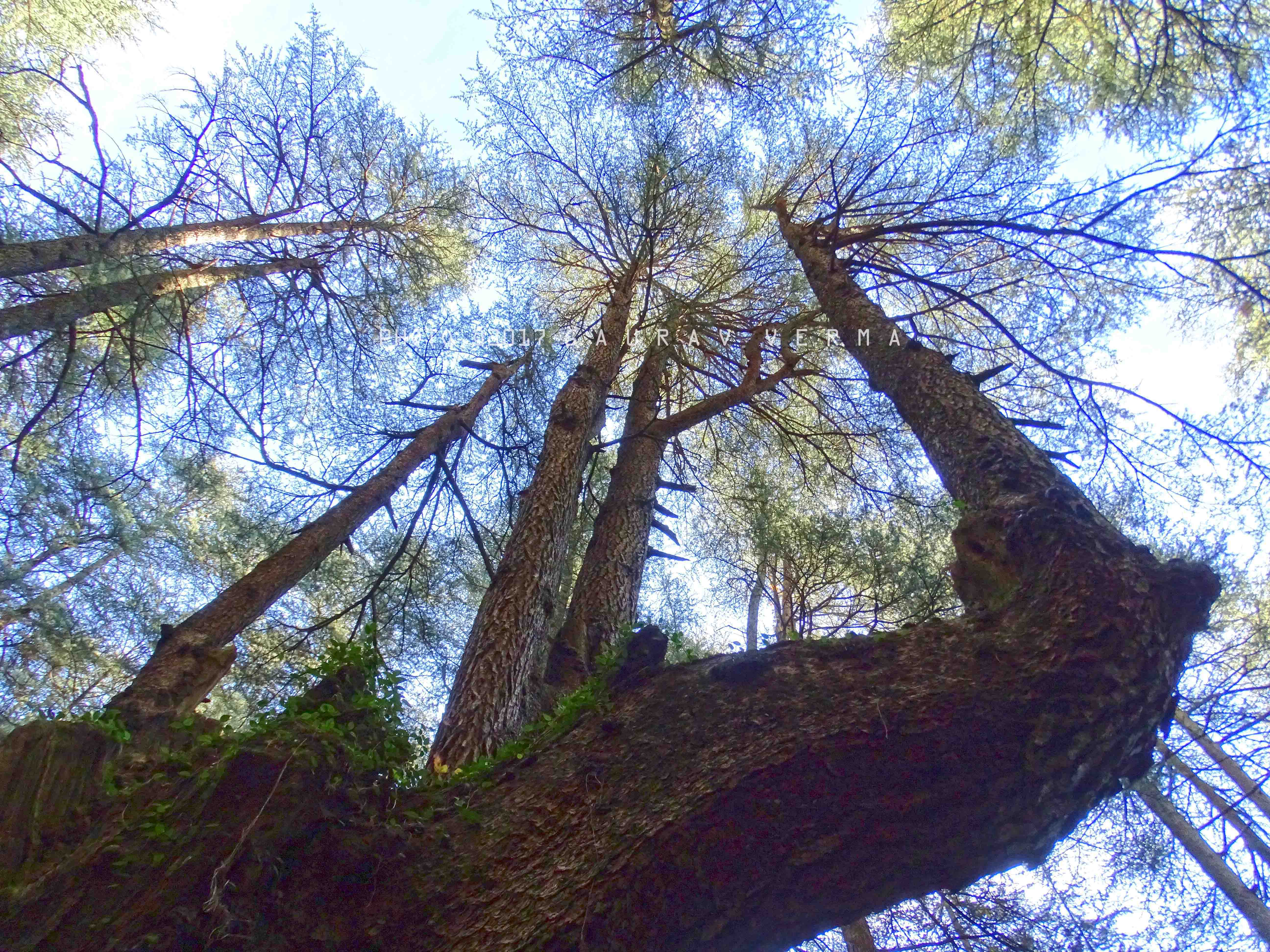
- Cedrus deodara at Chail, Himachal Pradesh, India

- Ecoregion territory (in purple)

Ecology
- Realm: Indomalayan
- Biome: temperate coniferous forests
- Borders: List: Northwestern Himalayan alpine shrub and meadows; Western Himalayan alpine shrub and meadows; Western Himalayan broadleaf forests; Himalayan subtropical pine forests; Baluchistan xeric woodlands
- Bird species: 315
- Mammal species: 102

Geography
- Area: 39,700 km^{2} (15,300 mi^{2})
- Countries: India; Nepal; Pakistan; Afghanistan

Conservation
- Habitat loss: 62.318%
- Protected: 6.18%

The Western Himalayan subalpine conifer forests is a temperate coniferous forests ecoregion of the middle and upper elevations of the western Middle Himalayas of Nepal, India, and Pakistan.

== Setting ==
The ecoregion forms a belt of coniferous forest covering 39,700 square kilometres (15,300 mi^{2}) on elevations between 3,000 and 3,500 metres (9,800 and 11,500 ft). It extends west from the Gandaki River in Nepal, through the Indian states of Uttarakhand, Himachal Pradesh, and Jammu and Kashmir into northern Pakistan. This belt of conifers is the highest expanse of woodland to be found on the slopes of the Himalayas, treeless alpine scrub lying just above its ecotopic frontier. It is a valuable ecosystem as many Himalayan birds and animals migrate seasonally up and down the mountains spending part of the year in the conifer forests, so conservation is a high priority.

Though being quite wet, his ecoregion is still drier than the Eastern Himalayan subalpine conifer forests, which receive more moisture from the Bay of Bengal monsoon.

== Flora ==
Several distinct forest types are found in this ecoregion. Fir trees (Abies spectabilis) in places grow in nearly pure stands. In other areas they mix with oaks (Quercus semecarpifolia). Rhododendron campanulatum, Rhododendron arboreum, Abies spectabilis, and birch (Betula utilis) form another common assemblage. Elsewhere mixed-conifer forests are made up of Abies spectabilis, blue pine (Pinus wallichiana) and spruce (Picea smithiana). Cupressus torulosa and Cedrus deodara are also found here.

A recently published major new monograph, Conifers Around the World, treats the high-level western Himalayan fir tree as Abies gamblei (apparently, Abies spectabilis does not reach this region!)

Following are some notable conifers present in the area:

- Fir: Abies pindrow, Abies spectabilis, and Abies gamblei
- Pine: Pinus roxburghii, Pinus wallichiana, and Pinus gerardiana
- Spruce: Picea smithiana
- Cypress: Cupressus torulosa
- Juniper: Juniperus communis, Juniperus indica, Juniperus squamata, Juniperus recurva, Juniperus excelsa subsp. polycarpos, etc
- Cedrus: Cedrus deodara
- Taxus: Taxus contorta and Taxus wallichiana
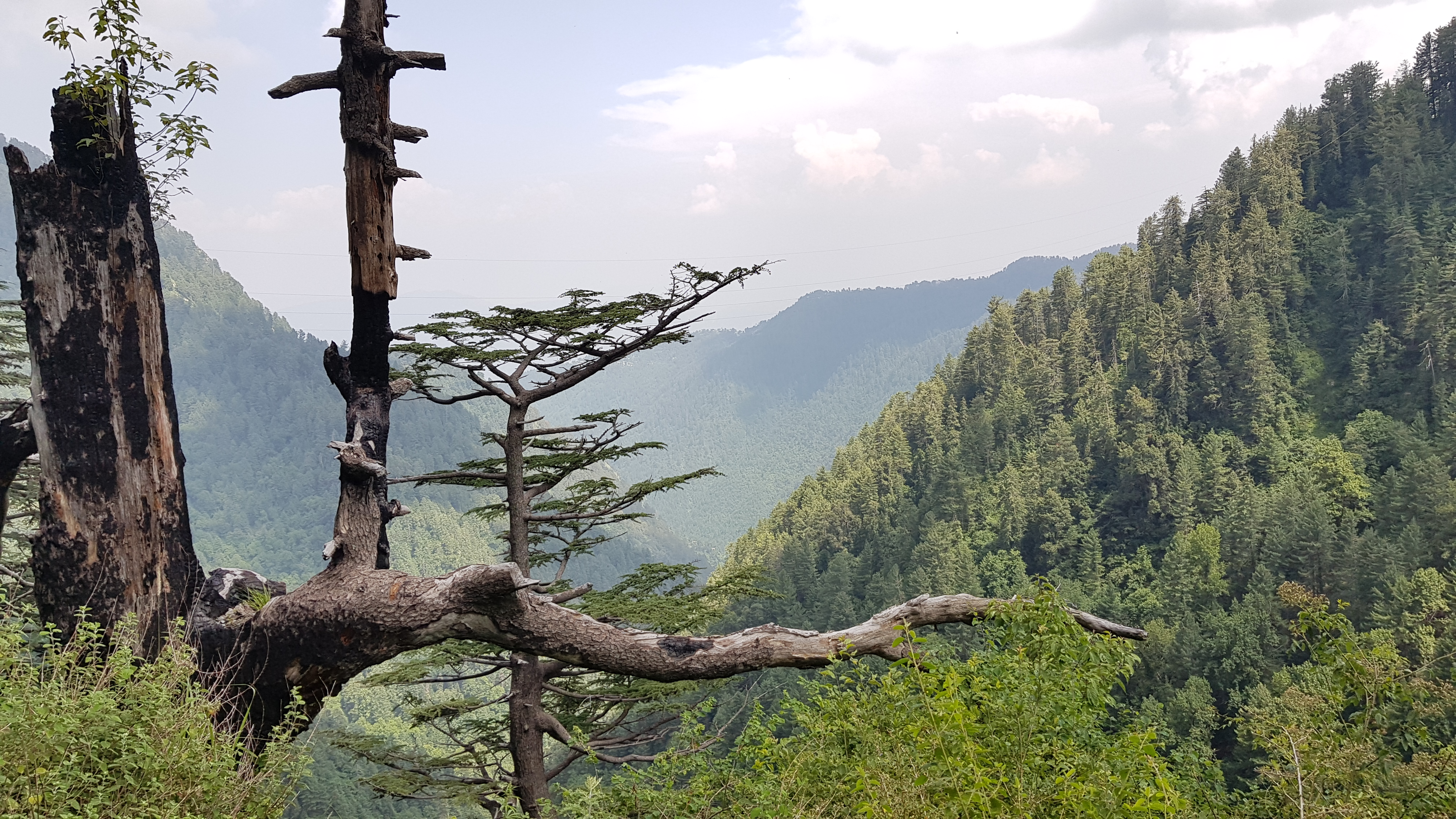
- Deodar forests in Ayubia National Park.
  Ephedra: Ephedra gerardiana, Ephedra intermedia

== Fauna ==
This ecoregion is home to some fifty-eight species of mammals. Predators include the Leopard, Himalayan brown bear, Himalayan black bear, large herbivores include the Himalayan serow, Himalayan tahr, Kashmir musk deer, Himalayan goral and the Markhor goat, the national symbol of Pakistan. The murree vole, is near endemic.

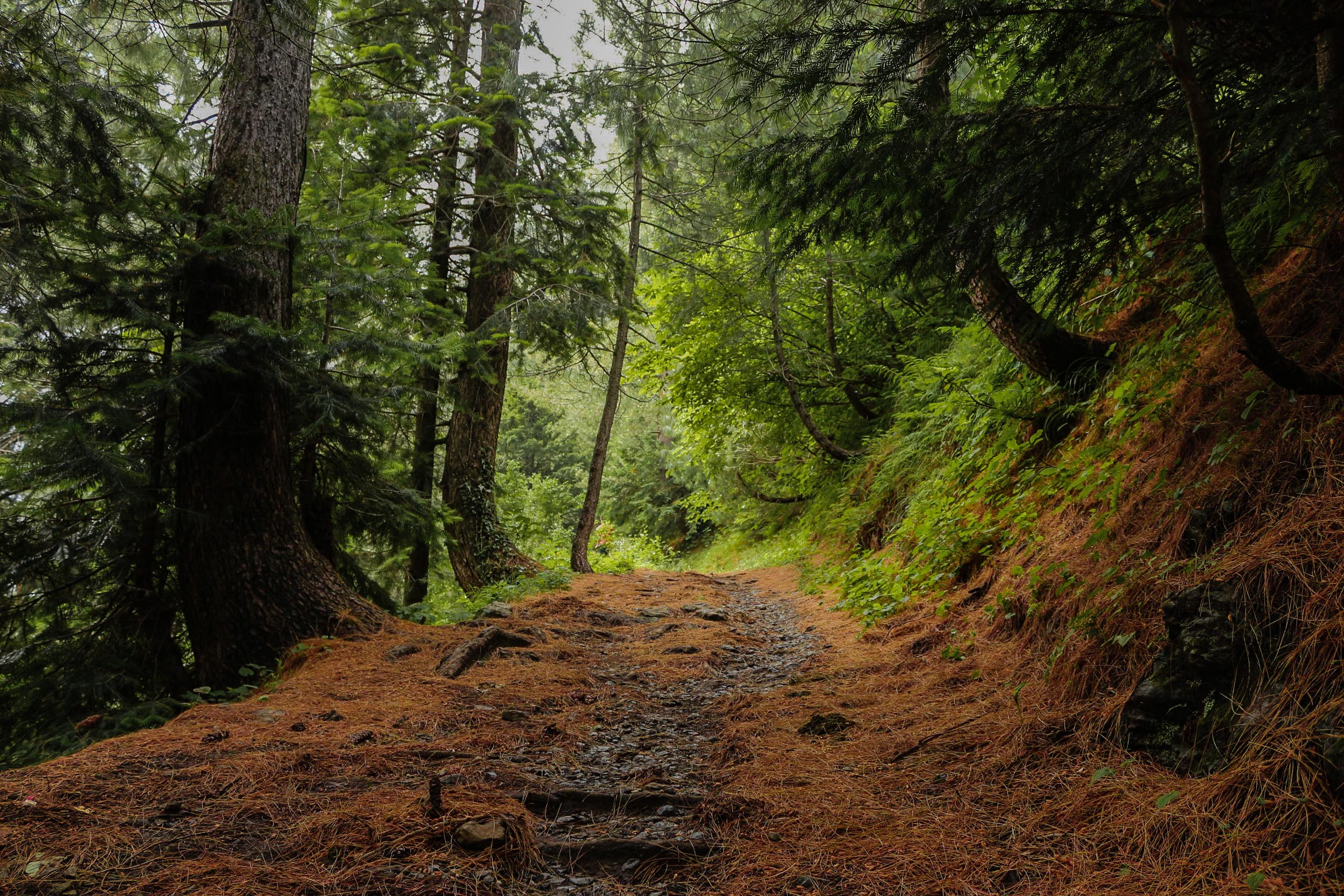
Forested path to Mushkpuri Top.

About 285 species of birds have been recorded in this ecoregion, including 9 endemic species and a number of birds that are sensitive to habitat disturbance and therefore likely to be vulnerable to further forest clearance. These include the Koklass pheasant (Pucrasia macrolopha), western tragopan (Tragopan melanocephalus), and the Himalayan monal (Lophophorus impejanus).

== Threats and conservation ==
Despite being relatively thinly populated some seventy percent of the conifer forest has been cleared or degraded, partly to make way for terrace cultivation. However it still contains some of the least disturbed forests in the western Himalayas. Protected areas that contain areas of conifer forest include Great Himalayan National Park and Rupi Bhabha Sanctuary in Himachal Pradesh, Kishtwar National Park in Jammu and Kashmir, Gangotri National Park and Govind Pashu Vihar Wildlife Sanctuary in Uttarakhand, all in India, as well as Royal Dhorpatan Hunting Reserve in Nepal, Ayubia National Park and Machiara National Park in Pakistan. A particular threat comes from disturbance of nesting birds during the collection of morel mushrooms in spring.

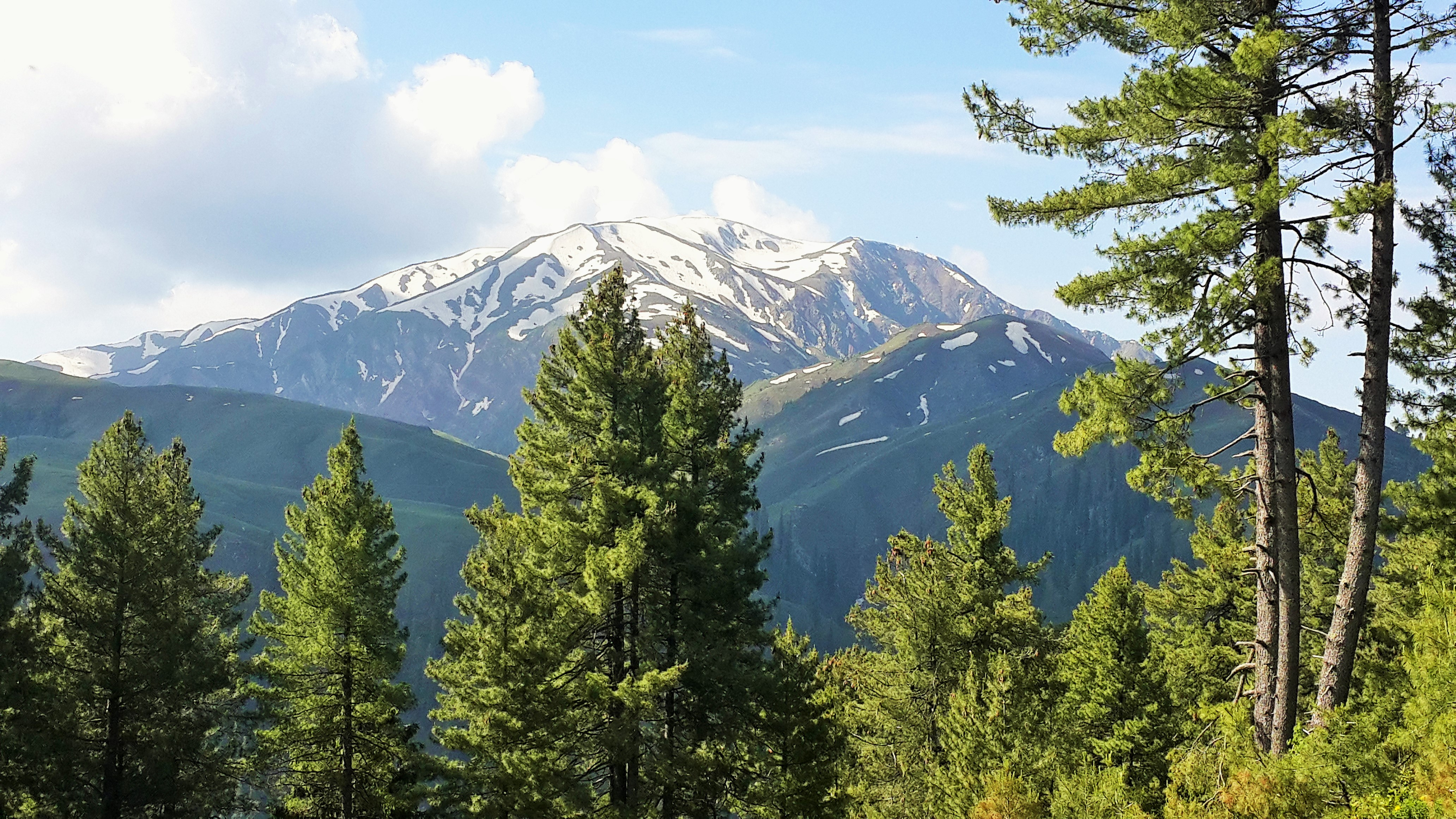
Forest dominated by Pinus wallichiana in Kaghan Valley.

Extraction of firewood for heating among rural populations in Pakistan has degraded forests at some locations.

== See also ==
- Himalayan silver fir forests — plant community within the ecoregion.
- Flora of West Himalaya
- Ecoregions of the Himalayas
- List of ecoregions in India
