= Shamshi, Himachal Pradesh =

Village in Himachal Pradesh, India

Shamshi is a village in the Kullu district of Himachal Pradesh, India. It hosts several governmental and industrial establishments of the Kullu district.

== Geography ==
Shamshi is located in the Kullu valley, on the right side of the Beas river. The Khokhan range rises to the west of Shamshi, while the Bijli Mahadev mountain dominates the ranges to its east. Shamshi is located just ahead of the town of Bhuntar, in the direction of Kullu.

== History ==
Shamshi finds a mention in the colonial-era Kangra District Gazetteer, 1897 as 'Shamsi', a patti (tract) of the Khokhan kothi (revenue district) of the Kullu tehsil which had a cultivated area of 566 acres. The Kangra District Gazetteer, 1917 notes that while Kullu was predominantly Hindu, just over nine hundred Muslims, in the form of Balti and Pathan traders, were also settled between Kullu's Akhara and Shamshi. Besides, this gazetteer also notes that there was a government-aided school at Shamshi.

== Culture ==
The local deity of Shamshi is Jwala Mata.

Village Khokhan, with its medieval-era temple dedicated to the deity Adi Brahma, is about 4 km from Shamshi. In local myths, Adi Brahma is the brother of Shamshi's Jwala Mata. An annual festival associated with Shamshi, the Shamshi Virshu, is celebrated at Khokhan.

== Forestry and wood industries ==
Shamshi has offices and residences of the Parvati Forest Division of the Himachal Pradesh Forest Department. Among others, these include the office of the Director, Great Himalayan National Park, a UNESCO World Heritage Site near Kullu.

The Wood-Based Industry Workshop (WBI workshop) at Shamshi was established in 1965. The workshop remains functional, producing wooden furniture, panels, and tiles. In 2022, a museum of wood culture was opened at WBI.

The Himachal Pradesh Forest Development Corporation has a wood depot in Shamshi, where it auctions and sells timber and firewood.

== Other establishments ==
- Shamshi has a training centre of the Sashastra Seema Bal (SSB). At this centre, a few hundred Indian youth annually inducted into this paramilitary force from all over India receive 44 weeks of mandatory basic training.
- Shamshi has an Industrial Training Institute (ITI), which provides vocational and technical training to youth. Shamshi's ITI was established in 1962.
- The Bhutti Weavers Cooperative Society (shortened as 'Bhuttico'), the leading producer of Kullu woollens, is based in Shamshi. It was established in 1944.

== Transport ==
- Shamshi is located on the road from Bhuntar to Kullu. This road is connected to the National Highway 3 (Atari-Leh highway).
- Shamshi is about 3 km from the Kullu-Manali airport, towards Kullu.
