= Himalayan silver fir forests =

Forest habitat

Himalayan Silver Fir forests is a plant community and conifer forest habitat type in the Western Himalayan subalpine conifer forests ecoregion of the Temperate coniferous forests Biome.

The forest's vegetation is dominated by the Abies pindrow (Himalayan Silver Fir) species of conifer trees.

== Geography ==
It is located in the Western Himalayas region of the Himalayan Range System in southern Asia.

Himalayan Silver Fir Forests are found from the Gandak River region in Nepal, through the higher elevations of northwestern India, to montane northern Pakistan.

== See also ==
- Flora of West Himalaya
- Ecoregions of the Himalayas
- Temperate coniferous forests ecoregions — worldwide.
- Abies alba (European Silver Fir)
