= Bijli Mahadev =

Bijali Mahadev Mandir
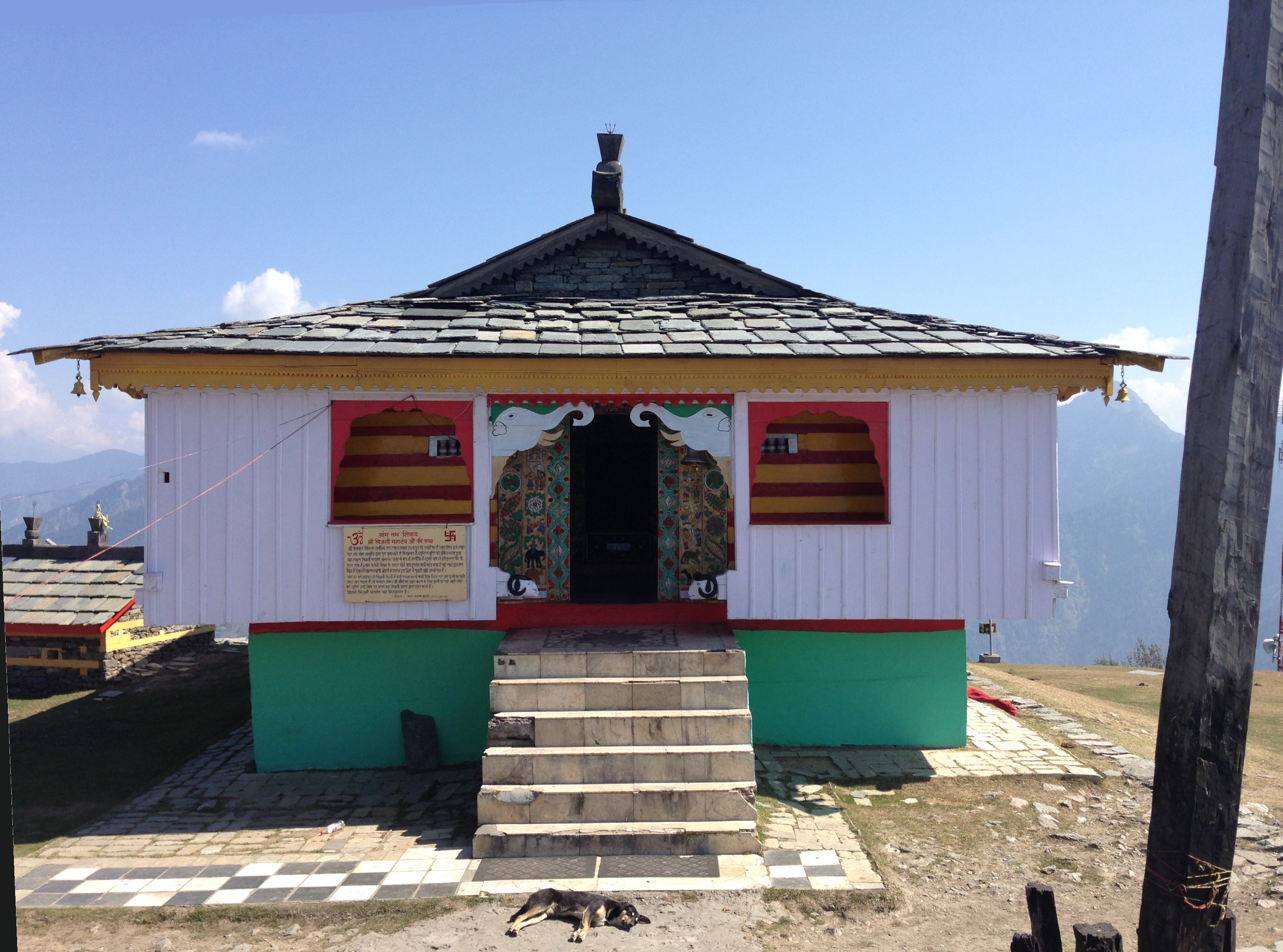
- Bijali Mahadev Mandir

Religion
- Affiliation: Hinduism
- District: Kullu district
- Deity: Mahadev

Location
- Location: Kashawri village, Kullu Valley
- State: Himachal Pradesh
- Country: India

Architecture
- Style: Kath Kunni
- Elevation: 2,460 m (8,071 ft)

Bijli Mahadev temple is a located in Kashawri village, Kullu Valley, Himachal Pradesh, India. It is located at an altitude of about 2,460 meters. The temple is one of the ancient temples in India and is dedicated to a major deity in Hinduism, god Shiva.

== History ==
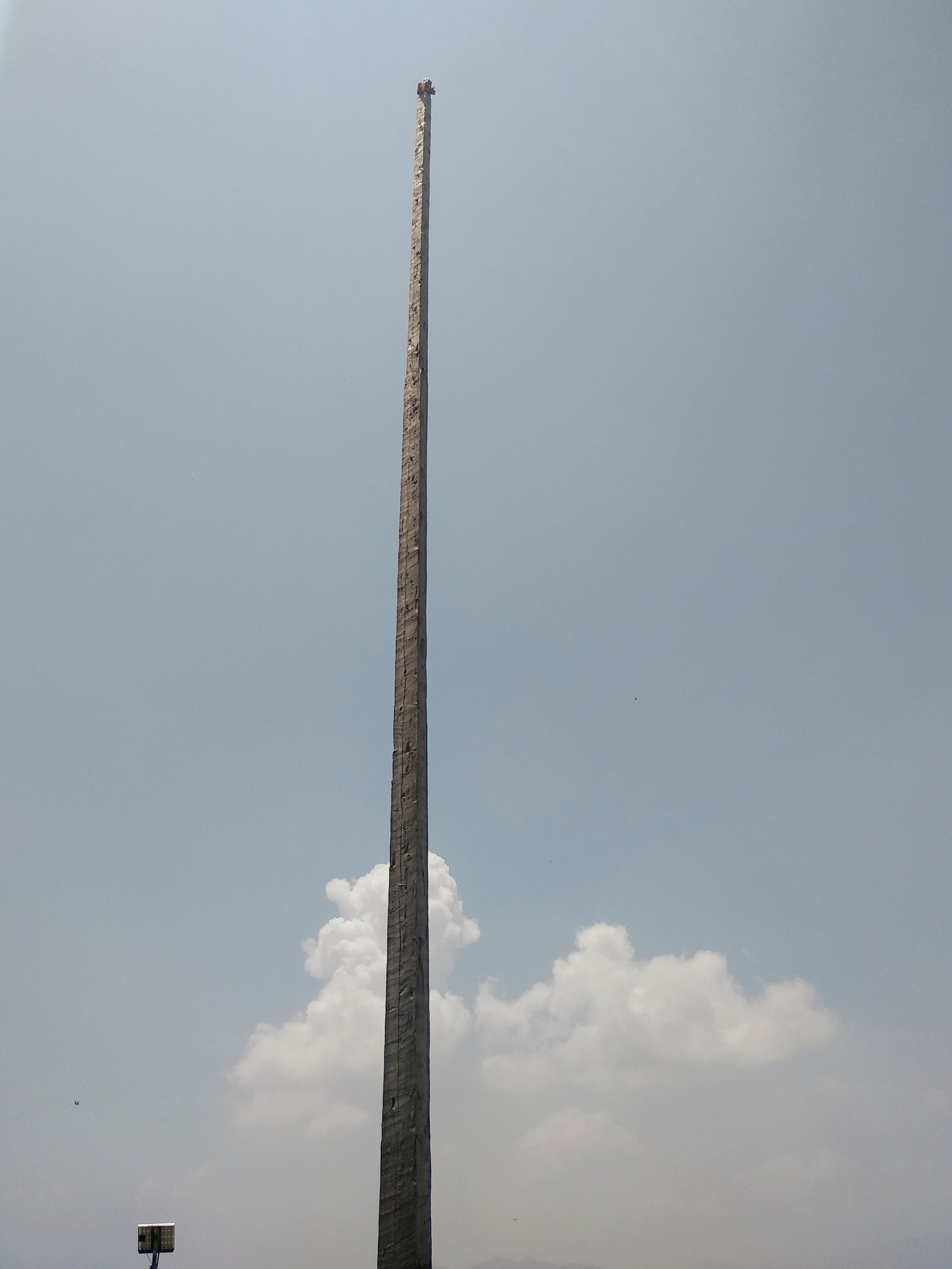
Wooden Staff at Bijli Mahadev

As per Hindu legend, the Bijli Mahadev temple was built as a way to pay homage to lord Shiva after he defeated the asura (demon) named Jalandhara with his trident and saved the Kullu valley from being submerged. The temple has been in existence from ancient times, per the local inhabitants. A different version of the legend also exists, which says that lord Shiva had killed an asura named Kulanta who reached Kully from the Mathan village in Lahaul-Spiti. Kulanta took the form of a giant serpent and wanted to submerge all forms of life on the planet under water. Shiva defeated the demon and rescued the people.

The temple is named Bijli Mahadev because lightning (bijli) strikes the temple every 12 years that breaking the lingam into pieces. The priest of the temple then uses a mixture of chopad (homemade butter), pulse flour and cereal to put together the broken pieces of the lingam. The temple has been built in Kath-Kuni architectural style, a traditional Pahari-style of constructing structures, especially in Mahasu region, as the temple lies in the region. It is widely believed that the temple was built by the Pandavas during their years of exile.

The lingam is placed within the sanctum sanctorum, and the 60-foot-high wooden staff built from deodar trees is placed in front of the temple. There are stone sculptures of Shiva and Nandi on the sides. Devotees circumambulate the sanctum through a wooden rectangular corridor.

The temple is among a few of Shiva's temples that are situated on a mountain top. About 23 kilometers away in Bajaura lies another old Shiva temple known as the Basheshwar Mahadev temple.

== Travel ==
Located at an elevation of 2,460 meters above the sea level, the Bijli Mahadev temple has the Kullu valley on one side and the Parvati valley on the other. Earlier, the only route to reach the temple was via a long trek. Transport developments have made it possible to reach the temple from three sides: Kullu valley, Parvati valley, and Naggar town. Trekkers opt for the Naggar route to reach the temple via Jana village that goes through dense deodar forests. A 3-kilometer trek from the last motorable access road takes visitors to the temple. A panoramic view of the different valleys can be seen from the temple. The months of April to June and September to November are the best times to visit the temple. The entire mountain gets buried in snow during the winters. Devotees usually visit the temple in the month of sawan.

== Gallery ==
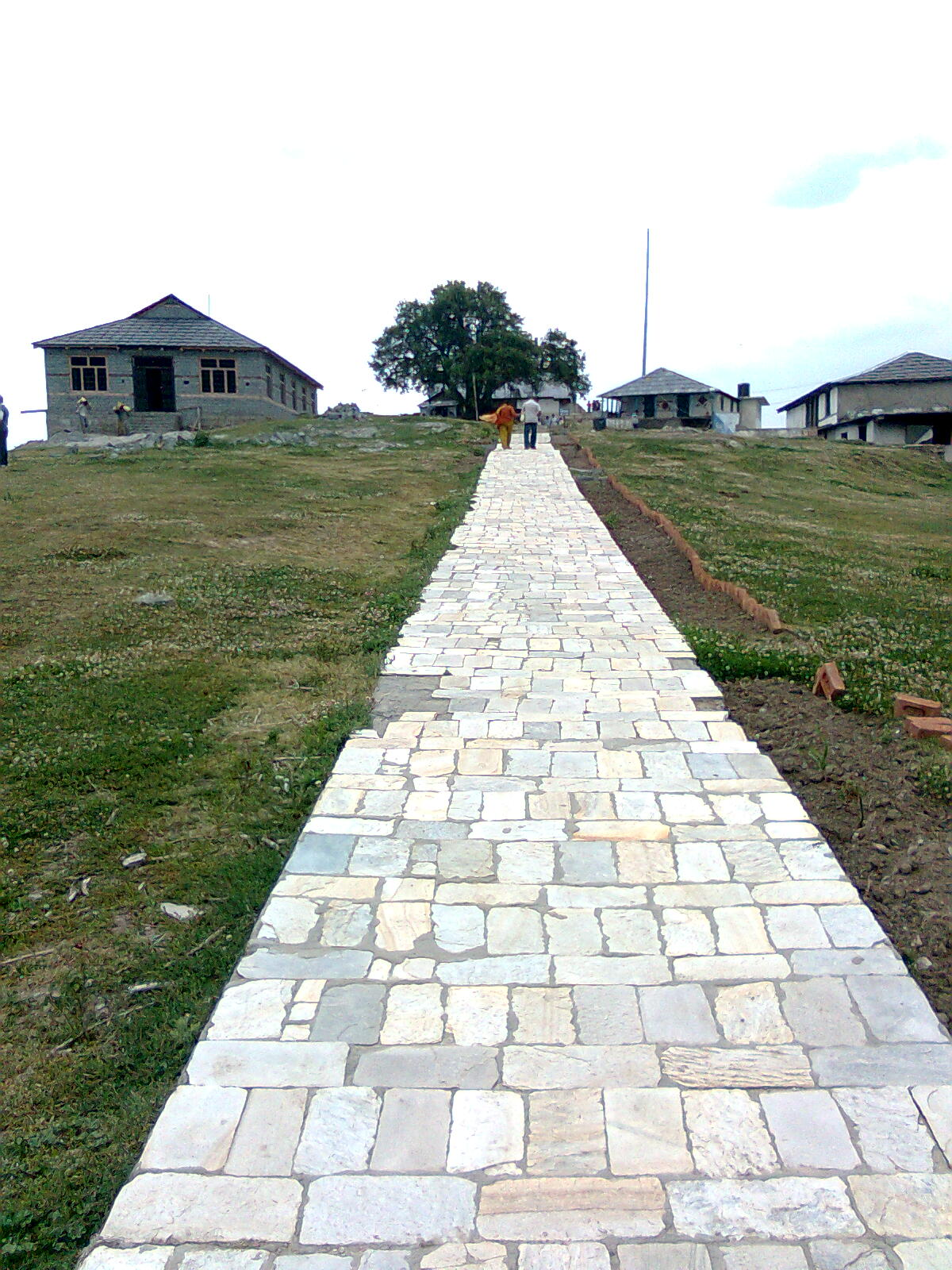
The way to Bijli Mahadev

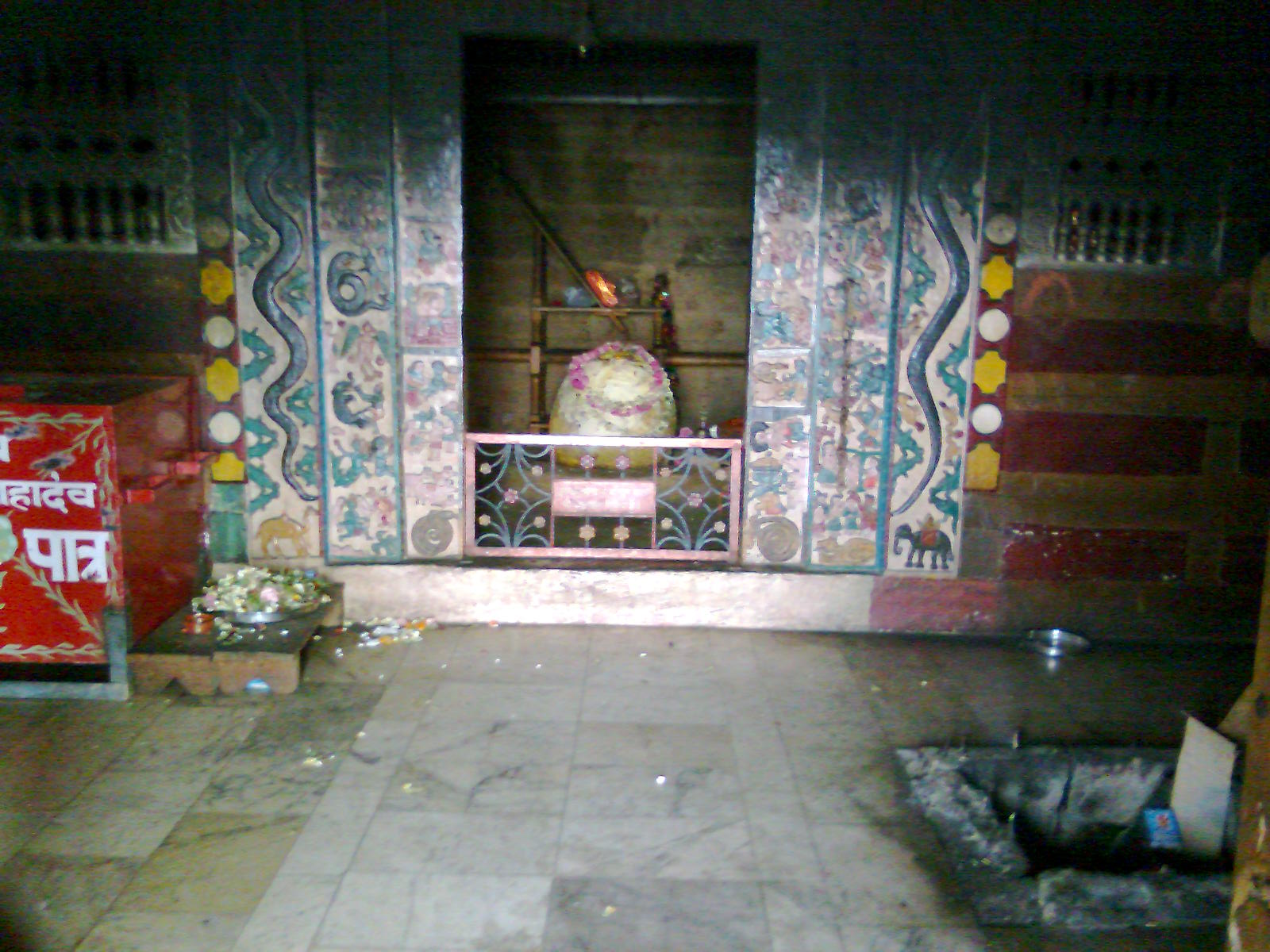
The main Shiv Linga

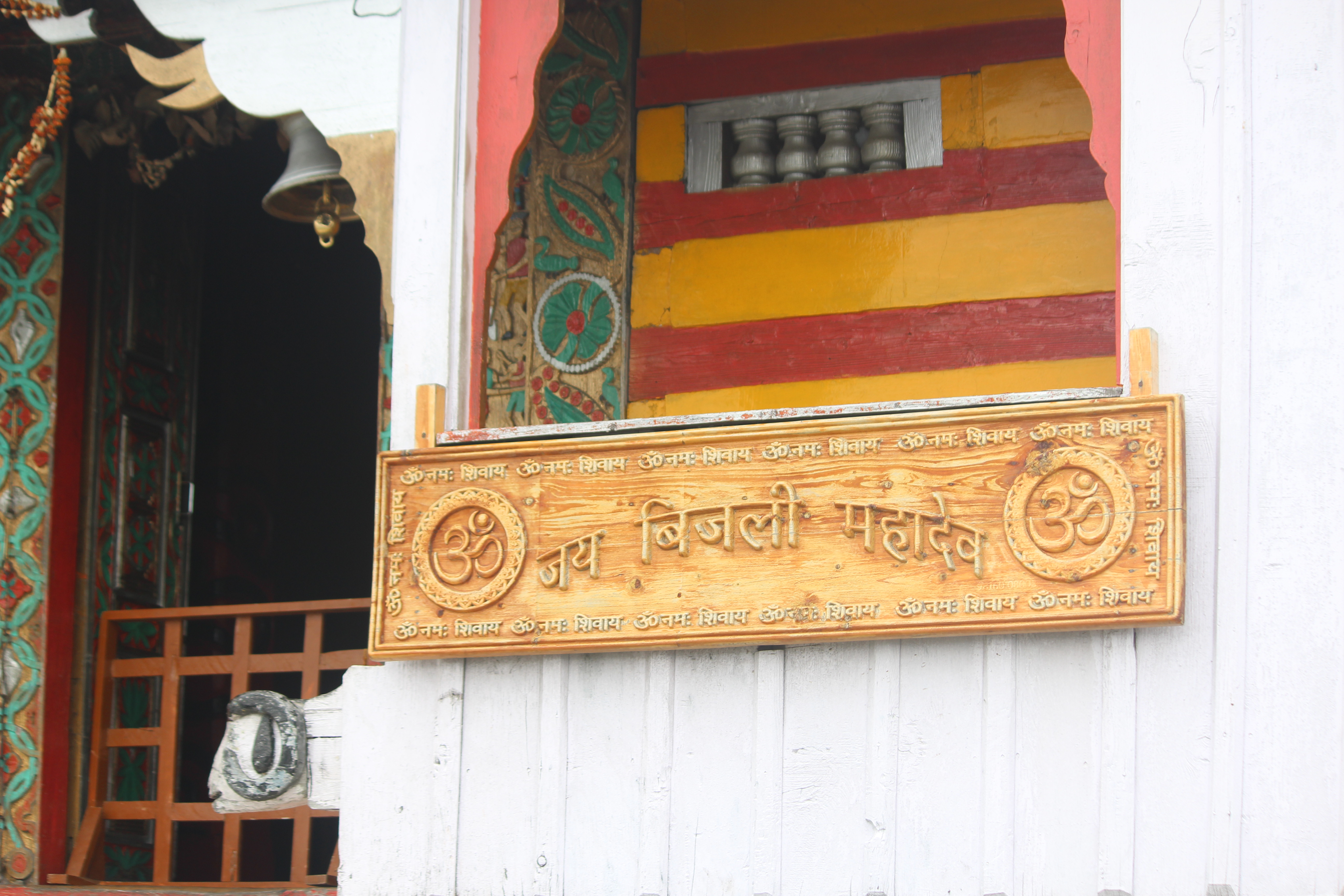
A name board at the Bijli Mahadev temple
