= Nagotal =

Nagotal is a village in Lower Dir District, Khyber Pakhtunkhwa, Pakistan.

== Geography ==
The village is surrounded by green mountains, and Nagotal has rich water resources.

"Maiden valley" is a populated valley. It receives over 1000 mm of rain annually and has an elevation of between 4,000 and 10,000 ft. Much of it is still forested: deodar and other conifer are dominant at the higher altitudes, and deciduous species including oak, wild olive and walnut proliferate at the lower altitudes. Lower down, increasing population pressure and the insatiable demand for firewood has reduced tree cover drastically.
