= Khokhan =

Coordinates: 31°25′N 77°16′E

- Village
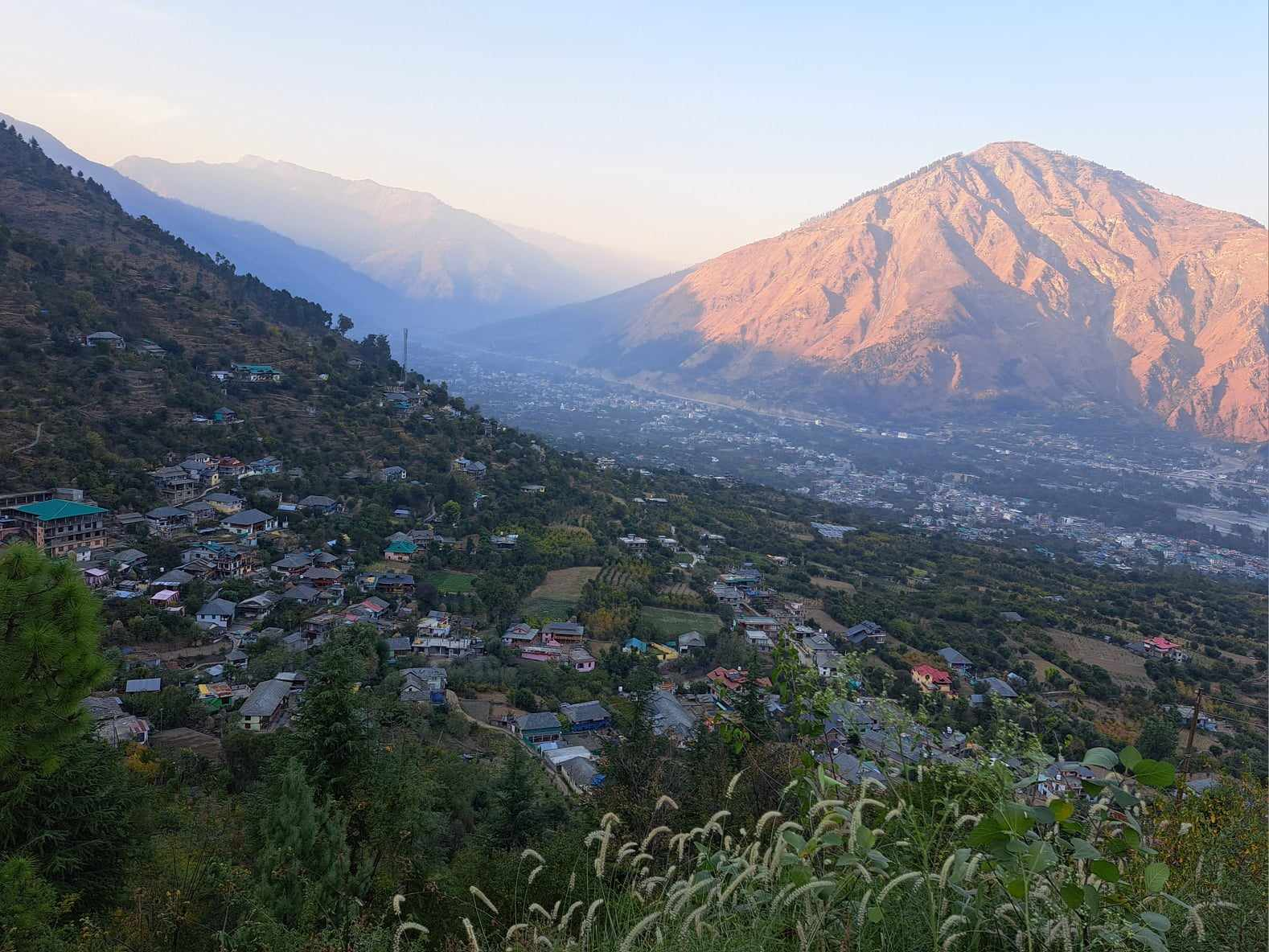

- Location in Himachal Pradesh, India Khokhan (India)
- Country: India
- State: Himachal Pradesh
- District: Kullu district

Government
  - Type: Gram Panchayat
- Elevation: 1,189 m (3,901 ft)

Languages
  - Regional: Kullui
- Time zone: UTC+5:30 (IST)
- PIN: 175125

Khokhan is a village in the Kullu district, Himachal Pradesh, India. It is located close to the towns of Shamshi and Bhuntar in the Kullu valley. Administratively, Khokhan constitutes a Gram Panchayat, led by an elected Pradhan, in the Kullu block of the Kullu district. The village is located on east and north-east facing slopes, and most of the village receives abundant sunlight throughout the year.

This village is known for the Adi Brahma temple and the Khokhan Wildlife Sanctuary.

== Adi Brahma Temple ==
The Adi Brahma temple is right above the Khokhan village. According to the historian O.C. Handa, the Adi Brahma temple has a four tier, pyramidal-style roof, in the 'hansakara' style. All in all, the temple is about 20m in height, from base till the top. Architectural as well as relic-based evidence at this site suggests that the present structure dates to the 14th century A.D., likely built by Raja Ban Sen (1301-1346 A.D.) of Mandi, on the site of an older, 'shikhara' style stone temple from the 10th-11th century A.D. This temple is a 'dehra' (resting place) of the deity Adi Brahma, whose moharas and 'rath' (palanquin) are placed in a 'bhandara' (treasury) across this mountain. Usually the dehra remains closed, and is opened only when the deity comes visiting, on his palanquin from the Bhandara.

According to custom, the Adi Brahma deity, called Devta Adi Brahma, is considered as a brother to the female deities of two nearby villages: Jwala Mata of Shamshi and Naina Mata of Bhulang. At a spur to the south of Khokhan village, there is a much more recent and smaller wooden temple of the deity Veer Nath. This deity is also related to the Devta Adi Brahma.

There is also another temple for Adi Brahma, built in the same style, at Tihri in Mandi district of Himachal Pradesh. In local folk belief, the Adi Brahma temple of Tihri village is related to the Adi Brahma temple of Khokhan village.

== Khokhan Wildlife Sanctuary ==
The nearby Khokhan Wildlife Sanctuary is named after the Khokhan village.
