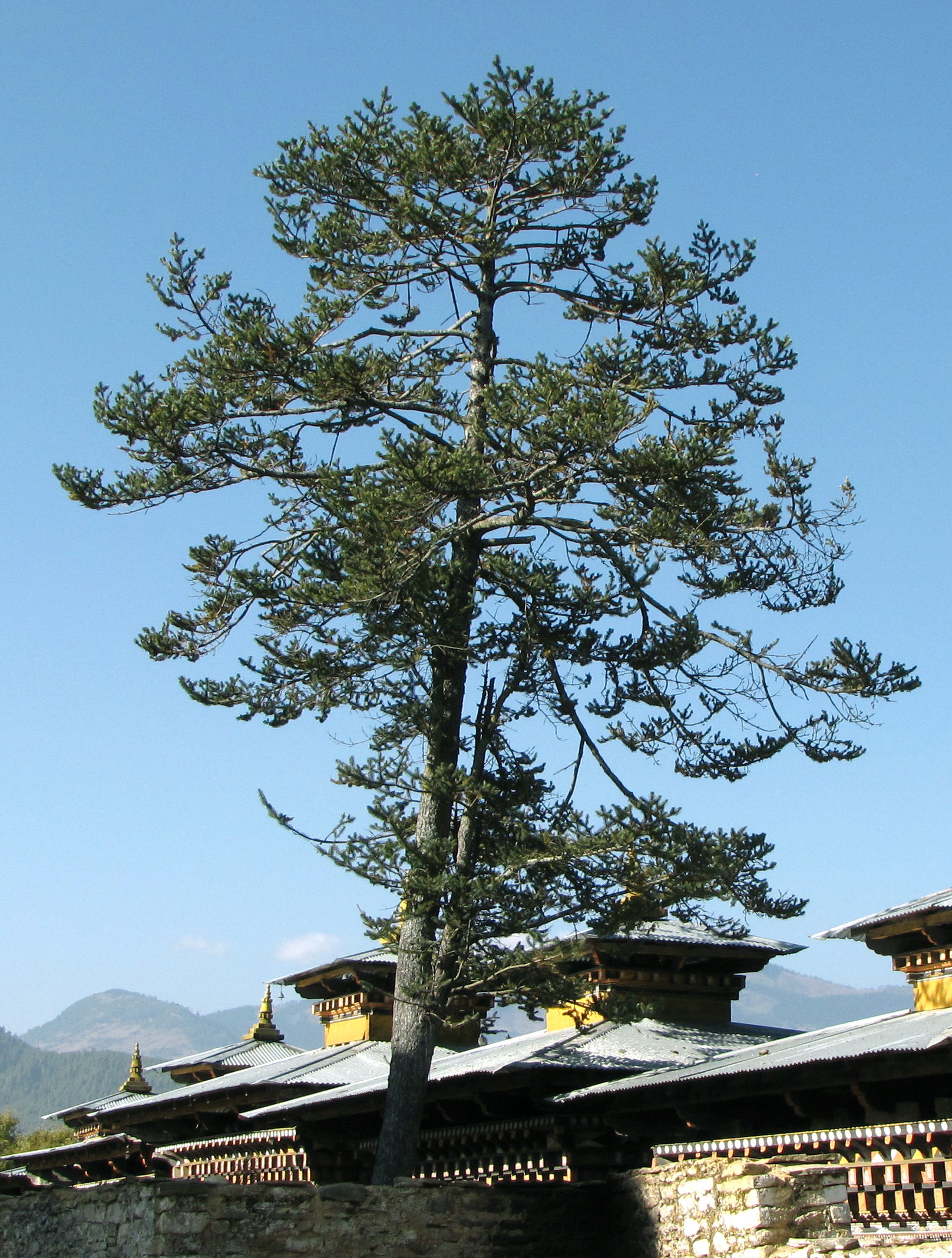

Conservation status
- Least Concern (IUCN 3.1)

Scientific classification
- Kingdom: Plantae
- Clade: Tracheophytes
- Clade: Gymnospermae
- Division: Pinophyta
- Class: Pinopsida
- Order: Pinales
- Family: Pinaceae
- Genus: Abies
- Species: A. densa

Binomial name
- Abies densa Griff.

Synonyms
- Abies spectabilis var. densa (Griff.) Silba; Abies spectabilis subsp. densa (Griff.) Silba; Abies fabri subsp. fordei (Rushforth) Silba; Abies fordei Rushforth

= Abies densa =

Species of conifer

Abies densa, the Bhutan fir, is a conifer species in the family Pinaceae. It is sometimes included in the East Himalayan fir (A. spectabilis) as a variety.

Found in Bhutan, China, India, and Nepal, it is not considered a threatened species by the IUCN.

Also called the Himalayan alpine fir, Abies densa is a dominant conifer in the upper coniferous belt of the central and eastern Himalayas from Nepal, Sikkim, Bhutan, and adjacent Tibet to Burma (Myanmar) in altitudes between 2800 and 3700 m. It is a tree up to 30–40 (sometimes to 60) m, with trunk diameters sometimes reaching 2.5 m. The bark is breaking to thick angular plates, the branchlets light grayish-yellow when young, later grayish-brown to gray. The needles are up to 4.5 cm long, with somewhat recurved margins. The cones are up to 10 cm long, bluish gray or dark blue to bluish brown, with bract length varying among individuals (slightly included or with more or less protruding, straight or recurving tips). Sometimes lumped with Abies spectabilis, a species of more westerly distribution, Abies densa differs from the former in several traits, e.g., its leaves are shorter, narrower, somewhat recurved, and are less silvery-white below; Abies densa also has smaller cones with bracts relatively longer than in Abies spectabilis.
