= Great Himalayan National Park =

National park in Himachal Pradesh, India

The Great Himalayan National Park
- IUCN category II (national park)
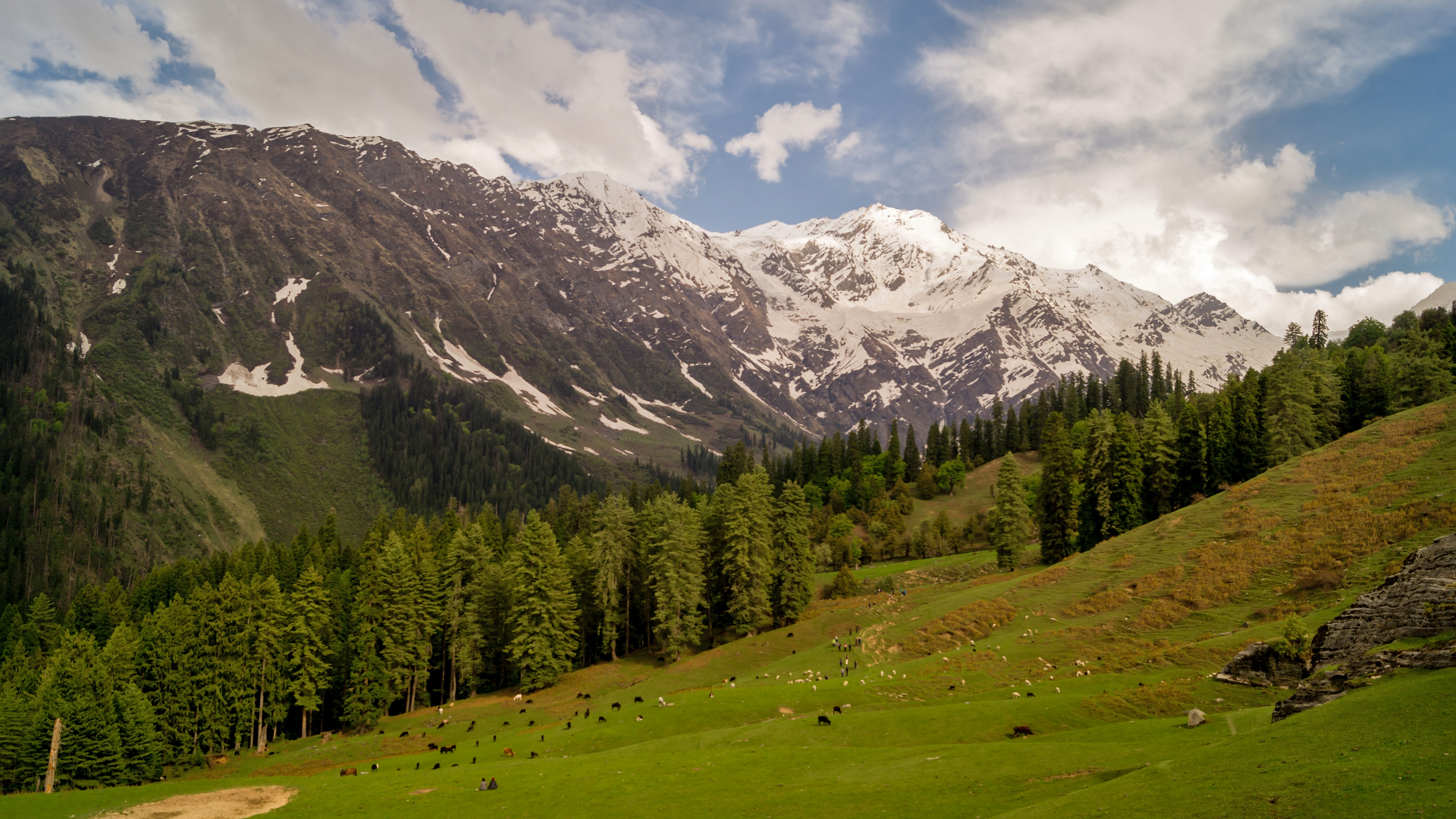
- View of a meadow in the park

- Location within Himachal Pradesh
- Interactive map of The Great Himalayan National Park
- Location: Himachal Pradesh, India
- Coordinates: 31°44′N 77°33′E
- Area: 1,171 km^{2} (452 sq mi)
- Established: 1984
- Website: https://www.greathimalayannationalpark.org/

UNESCO World Heritage Site
- Type: Natural
- Criteria: x
- Designated: 2014 (38th session)
- Reference no.: 1406
- Region: Asia-Pacific

The Great Himalayan National Park (GHNP) is a national park in India, located in Banjar sub-division of Kullu in the state of Himachal Pradesh. The park was established in 1984 and is spread over an area of 1171 km^{2}; elevations within the park range between 1500 and 6000 m. The Great Himalayan National Park is a habitat to numerous flora and more than 375 fauna species, including approximately 31 mammals, 181 birds, 3 reptiles, 9 amphibians, 11 annelids, 17 mollusks and 127 insects. They are protected under the strict guidelines of the Wildlife Protection Act of 1972; hence any sort of hunting is not permitted.

In June 2014, the Great Himalayan National Park was added to the UNESCO list of World Heritage Sites, under the criterion of "outstanding significance for biodiversity conservation".

== Biogeography ==
The GHNP is at the junction of world's two major biogeographic realms: the Indomalayan realm to the south and the Palearctic realm to the north. The temperate forest flora-fauna of GHNP represents the westernmost extension of the Sino-Japanese Region. The high elevation ecosystem of the Northwest Himalaya has common plant elements with the adjacent Western and Central Asiatic region. As a result of its 4,100 m elevation range the park has a diversity of zones with their representative flora and fauna, such as alpine, glacial, temperate, and subtropical forests.

These biogeographic elements are result of geological evolution of Himalaya which continues today from the action of plate tectonics and continental drift. Over 100 million years ago, the Indian sub-continent broke off from the large, southern landmass, Gondwanaland and moved north. It eventually slammed into the northern land mass, Laurasia, and formed the gigantic folded mountains of the Himalaya. Due to this union of Gondwanaland and Asiatic landmasses, exchange of flora and fauna was possible and this ultimately led to the unique biogeographical features in the region.

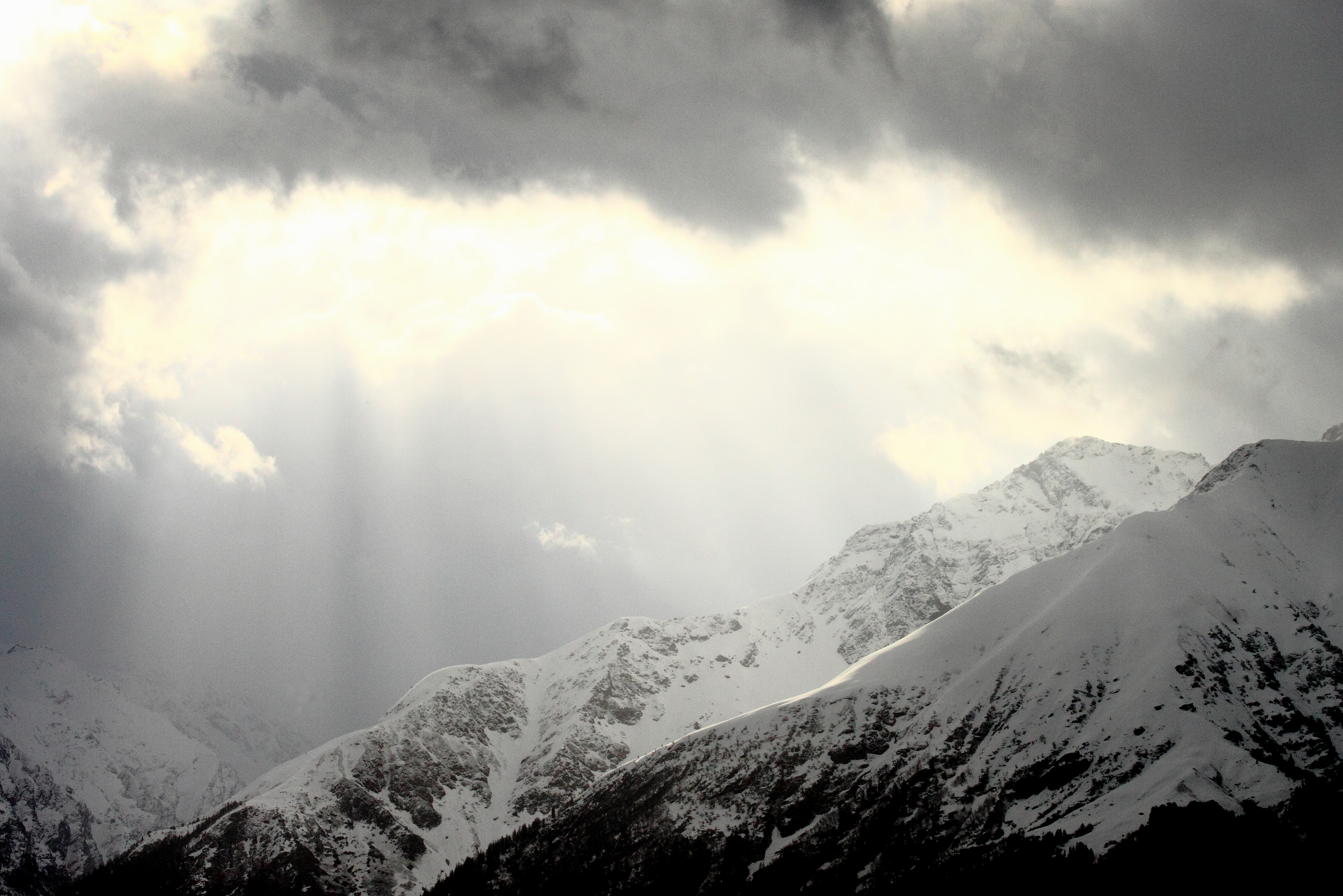
Mountains in GHNP

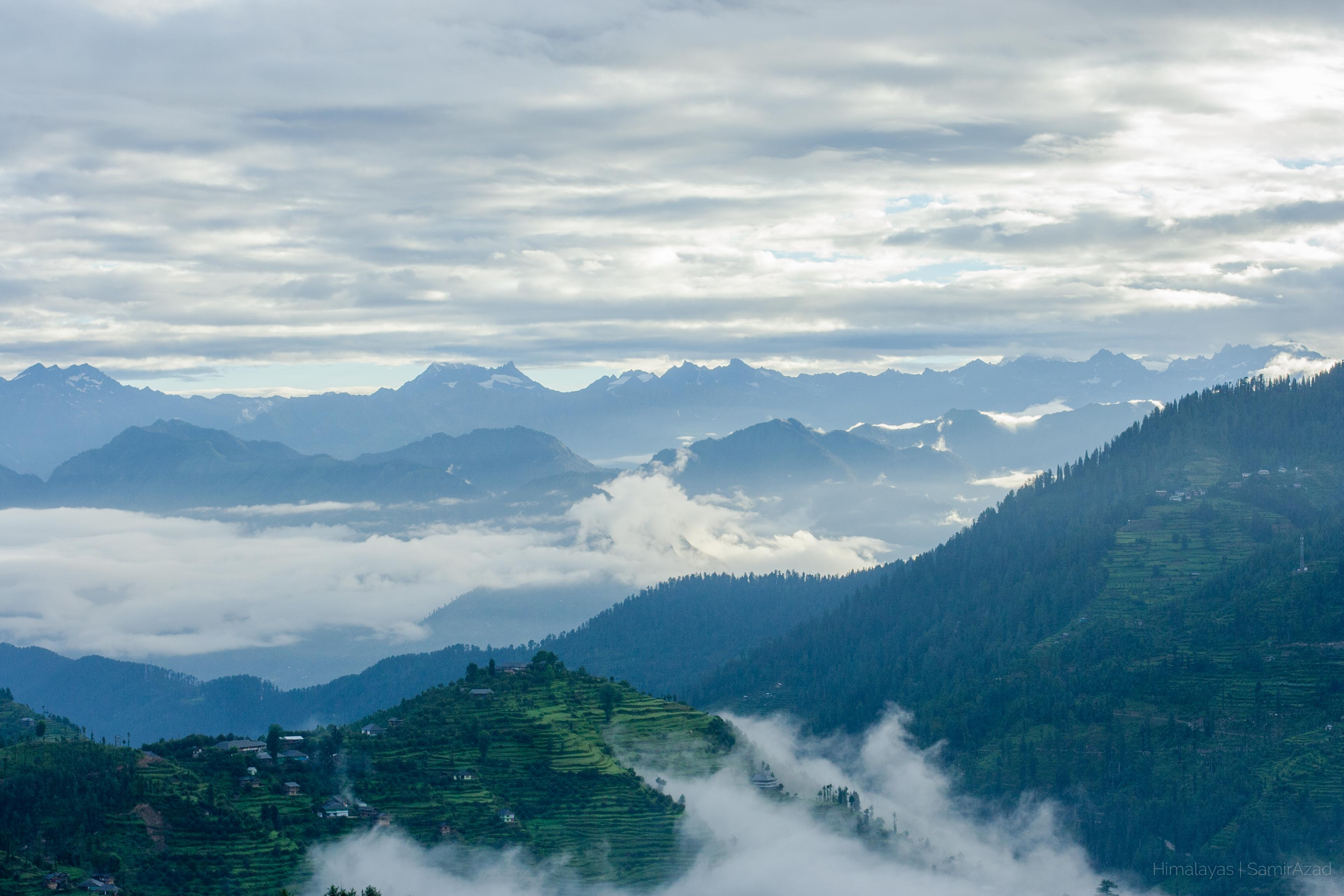
Several small villages are located in the western part of the park

== Timeline of creation ==
It took twenty years from inception to inauguration for GHNP to be realized as part of the Indian national park system. The following is a brief timeline:

1980: Preliminary park survey of the watersheds of Tirthan, Sainj and Jiwanal in Banjar area of Kullu district

1983: Continued park survey, the Banjar area of Kullu district.

1984: Himachal government expresses intention to create GHNP.

1988: Settlement of rights of local communities in GNHP begins.

1994-99: World Bank funds Conservation of Biodiversity project, during which 16 village eco-development committees are founded to involve local communities in biodiversity conservation; Wildlife Institute of India conducts research project at GHNP.

1996: Biodiversity Conservation Society (BiodCS) registered to share responsibility for GHNP management.

1999: GHNP instated as India’s newest national park; compensation awarded to local communities previously identified as having traditional forest rights there.

2000: WSCG organisers form SAHARA (Society for Advancement of Hill and Rural Areas) to work with GHNP management.

2008: Research on western tragopan population in GHNP, in collaboration with Wildlife Institute of India.

2010: Proposal to declare 710 sq km Parvati watershed as Khirganga National Park in the north of GHNP to strengthen the conservation efforts. Two Wildlife sanctuaries of Tirthan and Sainj proposed to be merged into GHNP for a higher protection status.

2011: Application to nominate GHNP as UNESCO World Heritage Site, submitted.

2012: IUCN evaluation team visits GHNP for critical analysis of the property.

2013: GHNP's nomination considered and put in referral list; Management council constituted by involving all the heads of 13 local governing bodies.

2014: GHNP is awarded World Heritage Natural Site status in the proceedings of the 38th World Heritage Committee meeting at Doha, Qatar

== Biodiversity ==
=== Fauna ===
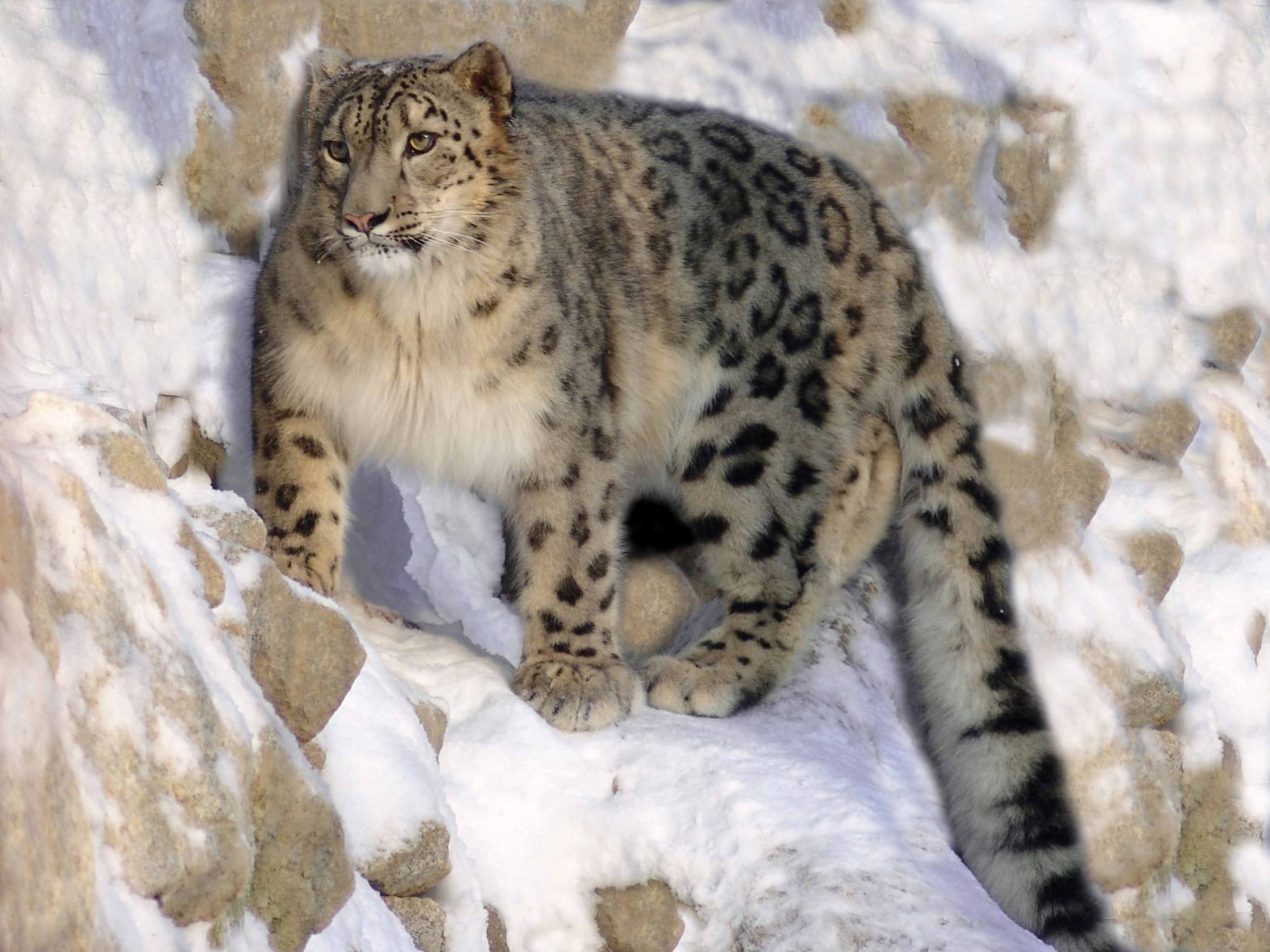
A closeup of Snow Leopard

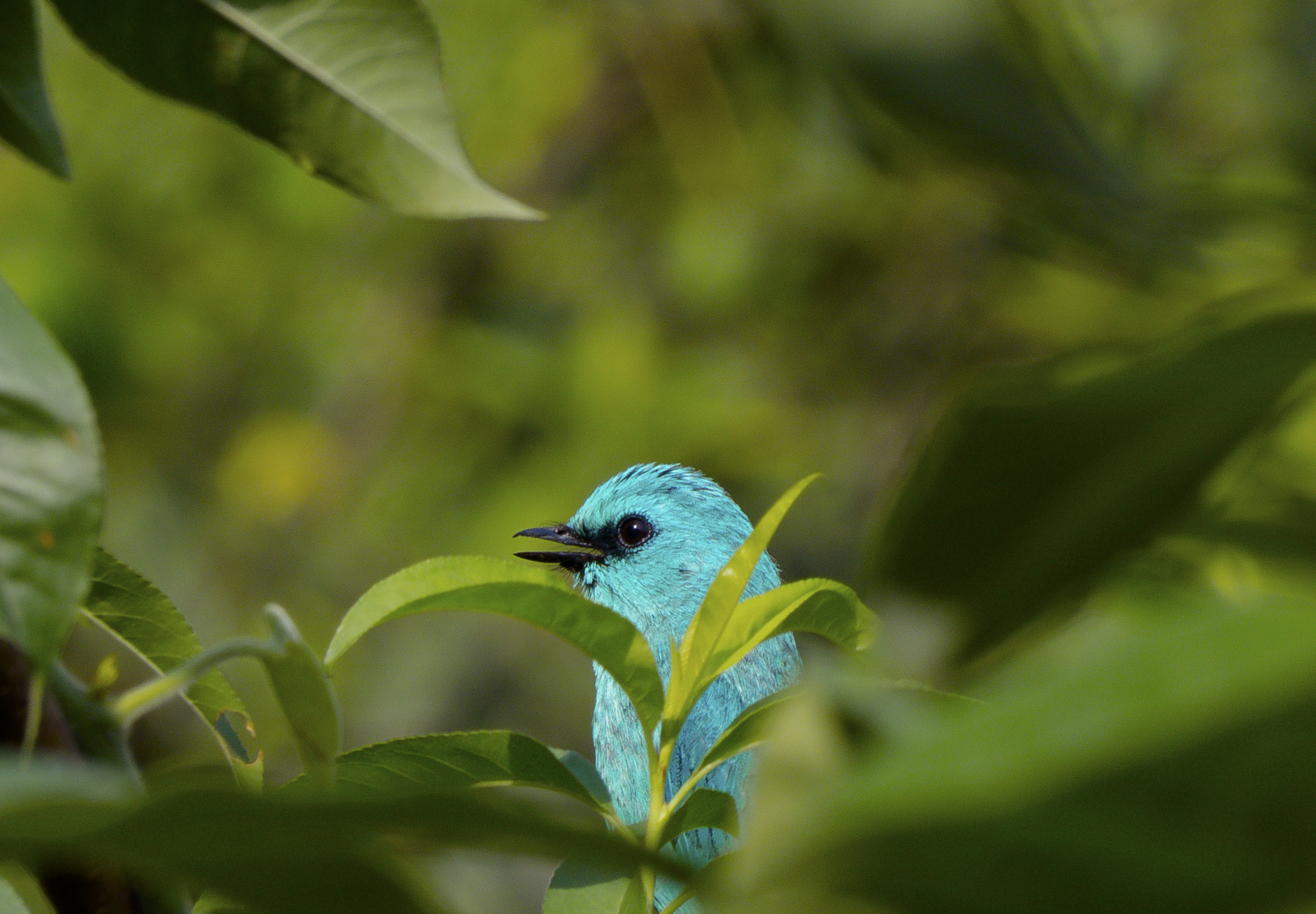
Verditer flycatcher in park

The Great Himalayan National Park is home to more than 375 faunal species. So far species of 31 mammals, 181 birds, 3 reptiles, 9 amphibians, 11 annelids, 17 mollusks and 127 insects belonging to six orders have been identified and documented. Most of the Himalayan fauna has been given protection under the high priority protection category of Schedule I of the Indian Wildlife (Protection) Act, 1972. The state government of Himachal Pradesh has banned hunting in the state for more than ten years. A trek of 35 to 45 km in any of the park's valleys brings one into the high elevation habitat (3,500 m and above) of animals such as blue sheep, snow leopard, Himalayan brown bear, Himalayan tahr, and musk deer. Best sightings can be made in autumn (September–November) as animals start their seasonal migration to lower elevations.

=== Flora ===
The GHNP also supports a great diversity of plant life, thanks to its wide elevation range and relatively undisturbed habitats. From the lofty pines and spruces and the great, spreading horse chestnuts of the lower valleys, to the dense cushions and prostrate branches of the alpine herbs and junipers, the park presents an endless variety of vegetation. Although some areas have been modified by grazing, this is one of the few areas of the Western Himalayas where the forests and alpine meadows can be seen in something approaching their original state. The subalpine zone is richest in species, followed by the alpine and upper temperate zones.

== Trekking and tourism ==
In the recent years, the GHNP has emerged as a popular trekking and ecotourism destination. The GHNP office at Sai Ropa issues permits for the treks. There are several popular trekking routes in the park, ranging from those that can be done in a day or two, to those that can take up from a week to ten days. Ecotourism and homestay tourism has also being gaining popularity in places outside but near to the park.

The office of the Director, GHNP, is at Shamshi, in the Kullu valley.
