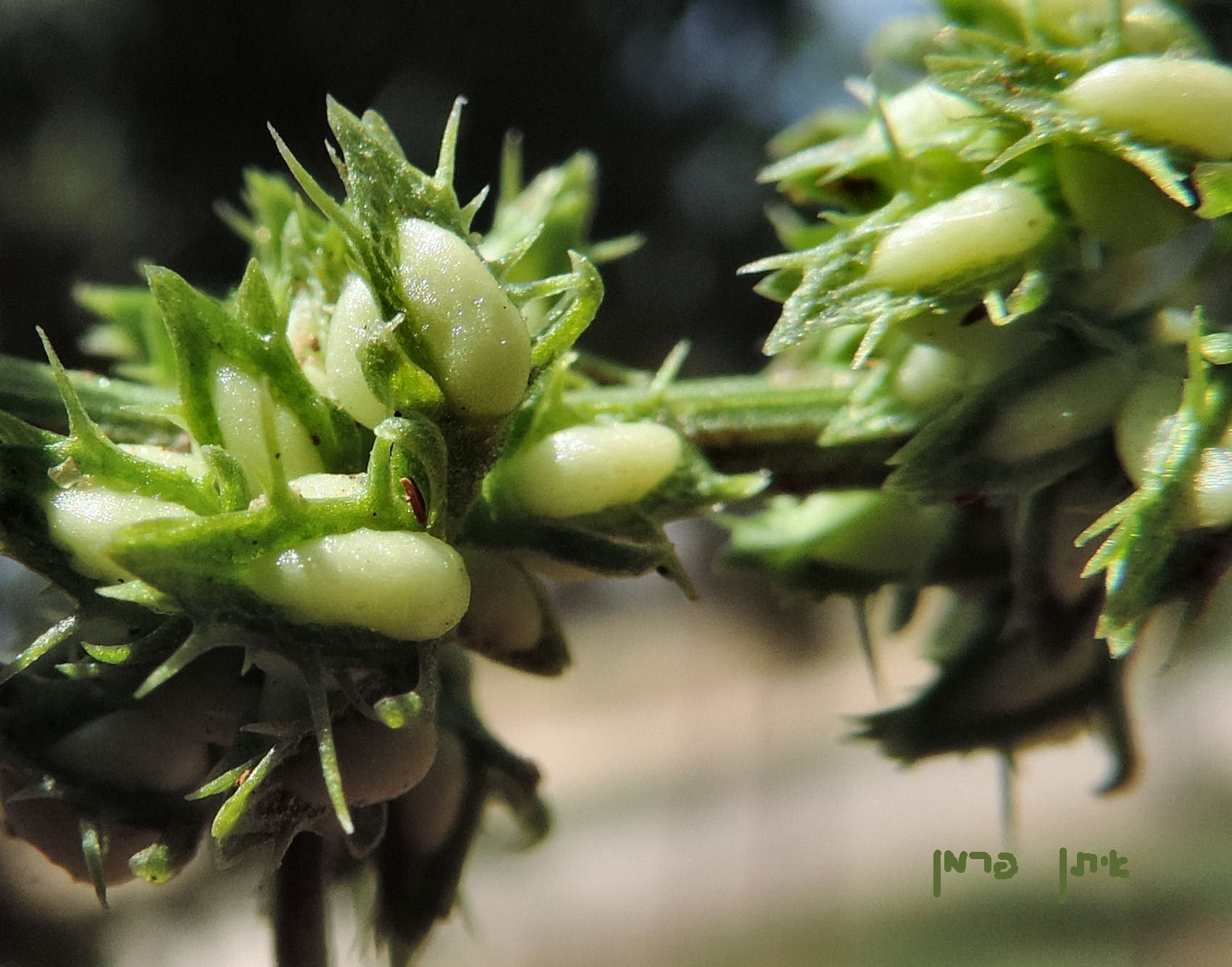
- Closeup showing teeth

Scientific classification
- Kingdom: Plantae
- Clade: Tracheophytes
- Clade: Angiosperms
- Clade: Eudicots
- Order: Caryophyllales
- Family: Polygonaceae
- Genus: Rumex
- Species: R. dentatus

Binomial name
- Rumex dentatus L.

= Rumex dentatus =

Species of flowering plant

Rumex dentatus is a species of flowering plant in the knotweed family known by the common names toothed dock and Aegean dock. It is native to parts of Eurasia and North Africa, and it is widely known elsewhere as an introduced species. It grows in disturbed habitat, often in moist areas, such as lakeshores and the edges of cultivated fields. It is an annual or biennial herb producing a slender, erect stem up to 70 or 80 centimeters in maximum height. The leaves are lance-shaped to oval with slightly wavy edges, growing to a maximum length around 12 centimeters. The inflorescence is an interrupted series of clusters of flowers, with 10 to 20 flowers per cluster and each flower hanging on a pedicel. Each flower has usually six tepals, the 3 inner of which are edged with spinelike teeth and have tubercles at their centers.

This plant has allelopathic activity.
