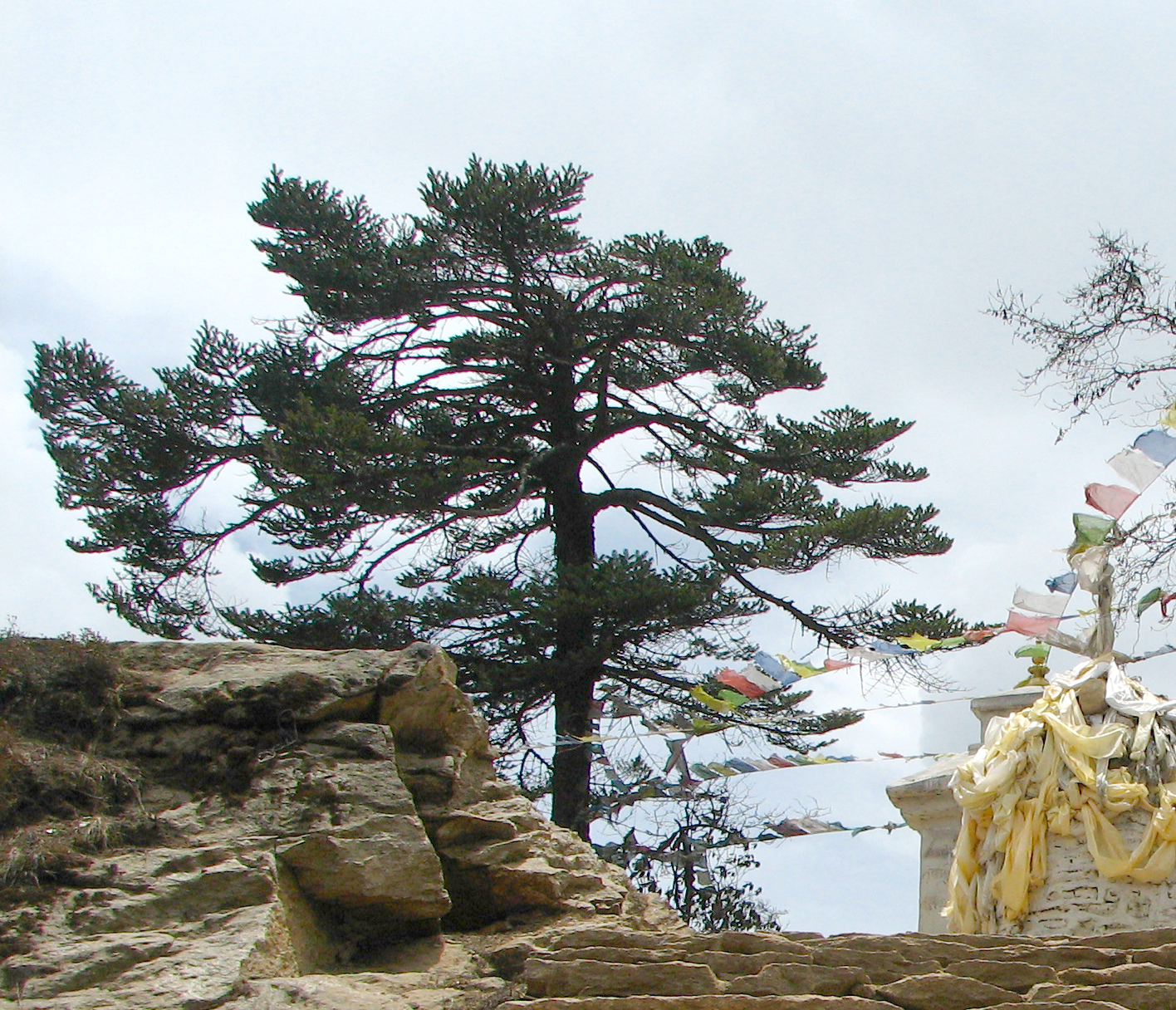

Conservation status
- Near Threatened (IUCN 3.1)

Scientific classification
- Kingdom: Plantae
- Clade: Tracheophytes
- Clade: Gymnospermae
- Division: Pinophyta
- Class: Pinopsida
- Order: Pinales
- Family: Pinaceae
- Genus: Abies
- Species: A. spectabilis

Binomial name
- Abies spectabilis (D.Don) Spach

Synonyms
- Abies webbiana (Wall ex D. Don) Lindl.

= Abies spectabilis =

Species of conifer

Abies spectabilis, the East Himalayan fir, is a conifer species in the family Pinaceae and the genus Abies. It is sometimes held to include the Bhutan fir (A. densa) as a variety. It is found in Afghanistan, China (Tibet), northern India, Nepal, and Pakistan. It is a large tree, up to 50 m (160 ft) tall.

Abies spectabilis has a wide distribution, but it has suffered from logging and deforestation, especially at the lower elevations. In 2011, IUCN assessed it as "Near Threatened".

Abies spectabilis occurs most commonly in mountains between 1600 and 4000 meters high, especially in the Himalayas. While it does appear in strips of its kind, it is more common to find Abies spectabilis around other similar trees, such as Abies pindrow and Abies densa. Abies spectabilis is commonly confused with Abies densa. It functions best in cold and wet climates. Abies spectabilis has been brought to places outside where it originated due to humans, and while it failed to take root in North America, it can be found in the UK and Ireland, though it does not always last in the heat of summer.
