= Deodar forests =

Forests of Western Himalayas dominated by Deodar Cedars

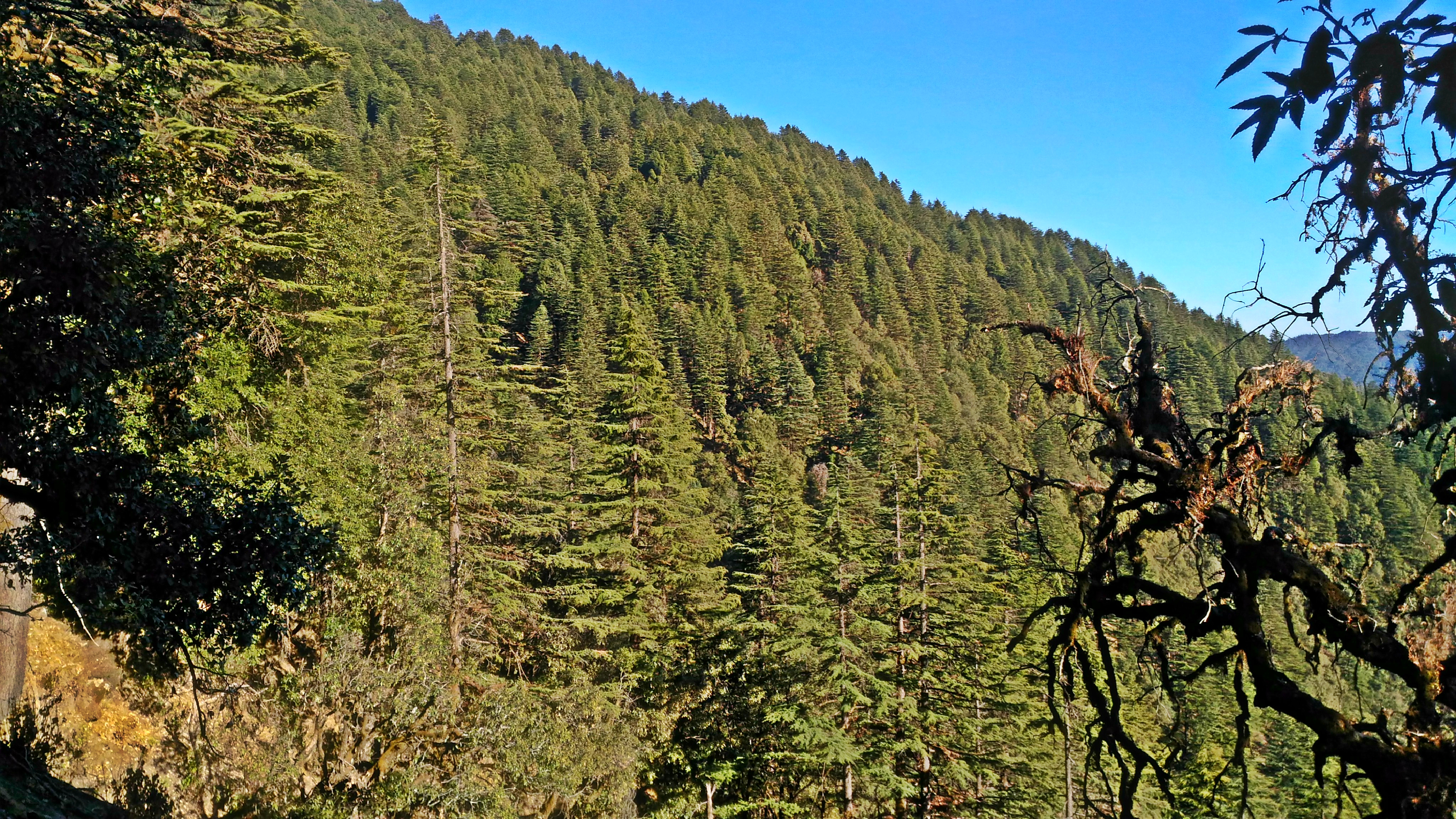
Deodar forest at Bindeshwar Mahadev, India

Deodar forests are forests dominated by Cedrus deodara, the deodar cedar. This tree is found naturally in the Western Himalayas from the Gandaki River in central Nepal to the Hindu Kush mountain range in Afghanistan.

The deodar cedar is native to the Himalayas, where its local name is deodar, which translates from the original Sanskrit as "timber of the gods". They were officially introduced into cultivation in 1831, although they have been grown in Chinese parks and gardens for centuries.

== Native forests ==
The native forests of the deodar cedar (Cedrus deodara) are located in the Himalayas, from Nepal through Pakistan, India and Afghanistan. This range is mostly dominated by Cedrus deodara; other species include Quercus ilex, Juglans regia, Taxus wallichiana, Picea smithiana, Abies pindrow, Pinus giardiana, Pinus wallichiana. There are several areas that appear monospecific, where Cedrus deodara is the dominant species. Most of the monospecific areas are dry temperate areas, but there are a few recorded monospecific areas that are moist temperate regions.

Deodar forests have been recorded to start growing at an elevation of 5,600 feet (1,700 m) and will stop at about 9,000 feet (2,700 m). Cedrus deodara will not tolerate temperatures below 0 °F (−18 °C), despite its natural high elevation.

== Urban forests ==
Deodar cedars are very popular in the urban landscape setting, making them very common. Placing more trees around cities is becoming increasingly popular and a necessity, adding to property value and air quality. This is creating new urban forests by mixing new species together and creating more diversity of natural habitats. The deodar cedar is native to a high climate that gets high amounts of snow in the winter season. Most places where this species is being introduced into an urban setting have less harsh conditions, allowing it to grow more resiliently. Deodars can range from 40 feet (12 m) in height to 160 feet (49 m), making them a prominent figure in the urban forest.

== Understory ==
Deodar cedars are not the only plant life of the forest. The forest floor is covered with many other plants contributing to the ecosystem, including Rosa webbiana, Rubus brunonii, Hedera nepalensis, Vicia sativa, Medicago denticulata, Rumex hastatulus, Cynodon dactylon, Rumex dentatus, Urtica dioica, Geranium rotundifolium, Viola conescens, Tribulus terrestris, and Aconitum chasmanthus.

== Climate ==
General cultivation of deodar cedars is limited to areas with mild winters, as these trees are frequently killed by temperatures below −13 °F (−25 °C). They prefer sunny and well-drained locations.

== Threats and challenges ==
This species of tree is used industrially for lumber and its oils in its native part of the world. Afghanistan, Pakistan and India have overlogged this tree and are starting to pose a serious threat to its native environment. There have been recent reports of Phytophthora cinnamomi affecting deodar cedars in the Himalayan regions. Phytophthora cinnamomi has killed 200 trees so far, and another 150 are starting to show unhealthy symptoms.

== Cultural importance ==
The deodar forests in the Himalayas are considered a sacred place to the Hindu people of India. Darukavana, which translates to 'deodar forest', is mentioned quite often through ancient Hindu texts. These forests are considered a spiritual place to live for families who are devoted to the lord Shiva, the Hindu god.
