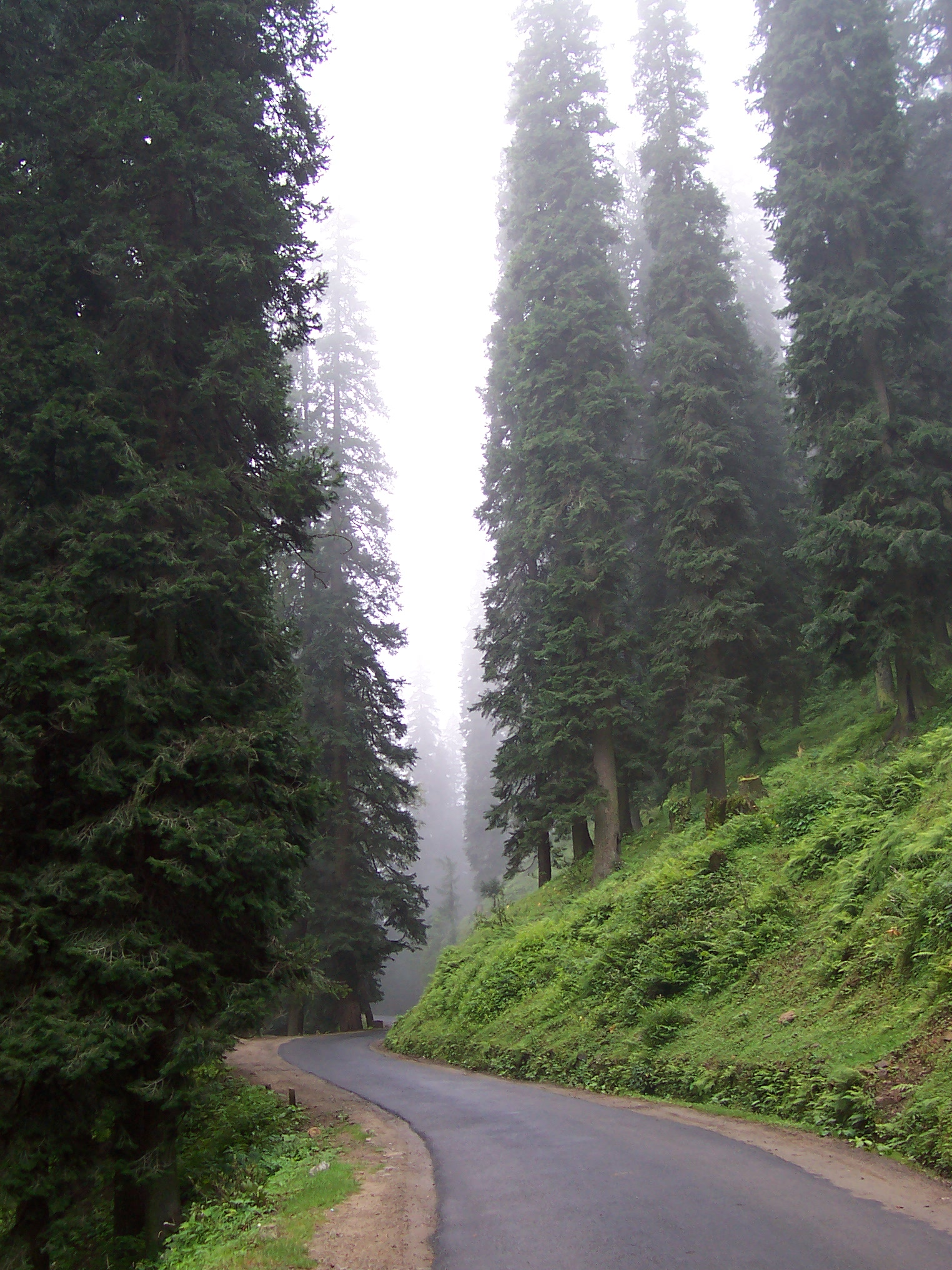
- In Himachal Pradesh, India

Conservation status
- Least Concern (IUCN 3.1)

Scientific classification
- Kingdom: Plantae
- Clade: Tracheophytes
- Clade: Gymnospermae
- Division: Pinophyta
- Class: Pinopsida
- Order: Pinales
- Family: Pinaceae
- Genus: Abies
- Species: A. pindrow

Binomial name
- Abies pindrow (Royle ex D.Don) Royle

= Abies pindrow =

Pindrow fir

Species of conifer

Abies pindrow, the pindrow fir, West Himalayan fir, or silver fir, is a fir native to the western Himalaya and adjacent mountains, from northeast Afghanistan east through northern Pakistan and India to central Nepal.

== Description ==
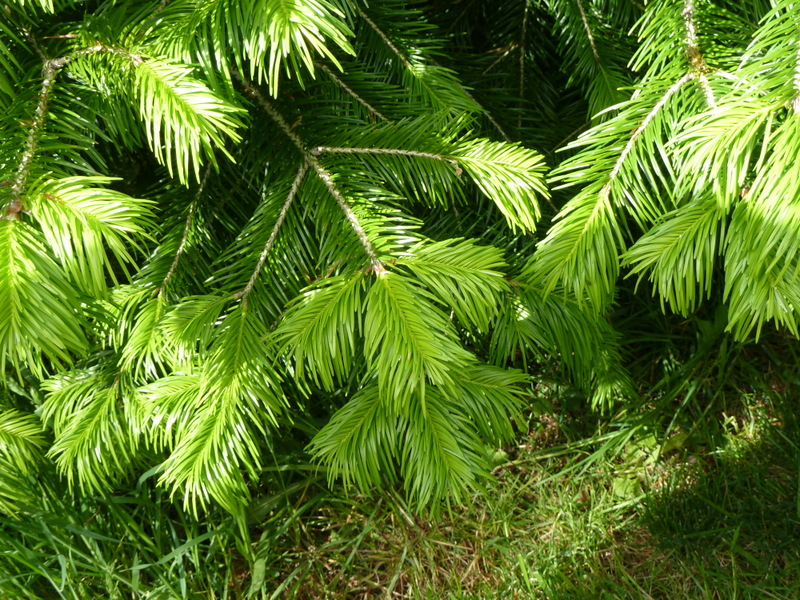
Leaves of cultivated tree at Birr Castle, Ireland

It is a large evergreen tree growing to 40–60 metres (130–200 ft) tall, and with a trunk diameter of up to 2–2.5 metres (6 ft 7 in – 8 ft 2 in). It has a conical crown with level branches. The shoots are greyish-pink to buff-brown, smooth and glabrous (hairless). The leaves are needle-like, among the longest of any fir, 4–9 centimetres (1.6–3.5 in) long, flattened in cross-section, glossy dark green above, with two whitish stomatal bands on the underside; they are arranged spirally on the shoots, but twisted at the base to lie in a flat plane either side of the shoot. The cones are broad cylindric-conic, 7–14 centimetres (2.8–5.5 in) long and 3–4 centimetres (1.2–1.6 in) broad, dark purple when young, disintegrating when mature to release the seeds 5–7 months after pollination.

The closely related Gamble's fir occurs in the same area but on somewhat drier sites; it differs in shorter leaves 2–4 cm long with less obvious stomatal bands and arranged more radially round the shoot. The cones are very similar.

Recent research, however, has shown that Abies gamblei is not related to Abies pindrow. At West Himalayan locations in Himachal state in India visited by members of the Dendrological Atlas team, at around 3000 m the latter species is replaced by Abies gamblei, showing no intermediate forms. Such areas included Churdhar and the upper Sangla Valley at elevations between 3000 and 3400 m where these species have morphologically and ecologically clearly separated. Elevation-wise, pindrow fir occurs between 2,000–3,350 metres (6,560–10,990 ft) (although mostly between 2400 and 3000 m) and Abies gamblei from 3,000–3,500 metres (9,800–11,500 ft). Some references of 3,700 metres (12,100 ft) naming (in error) "Abies spectabilis" in the western Himalayas, most probably are true for Abies gamblei, but to confirm this would require further research.

== Distribution and habitat ==
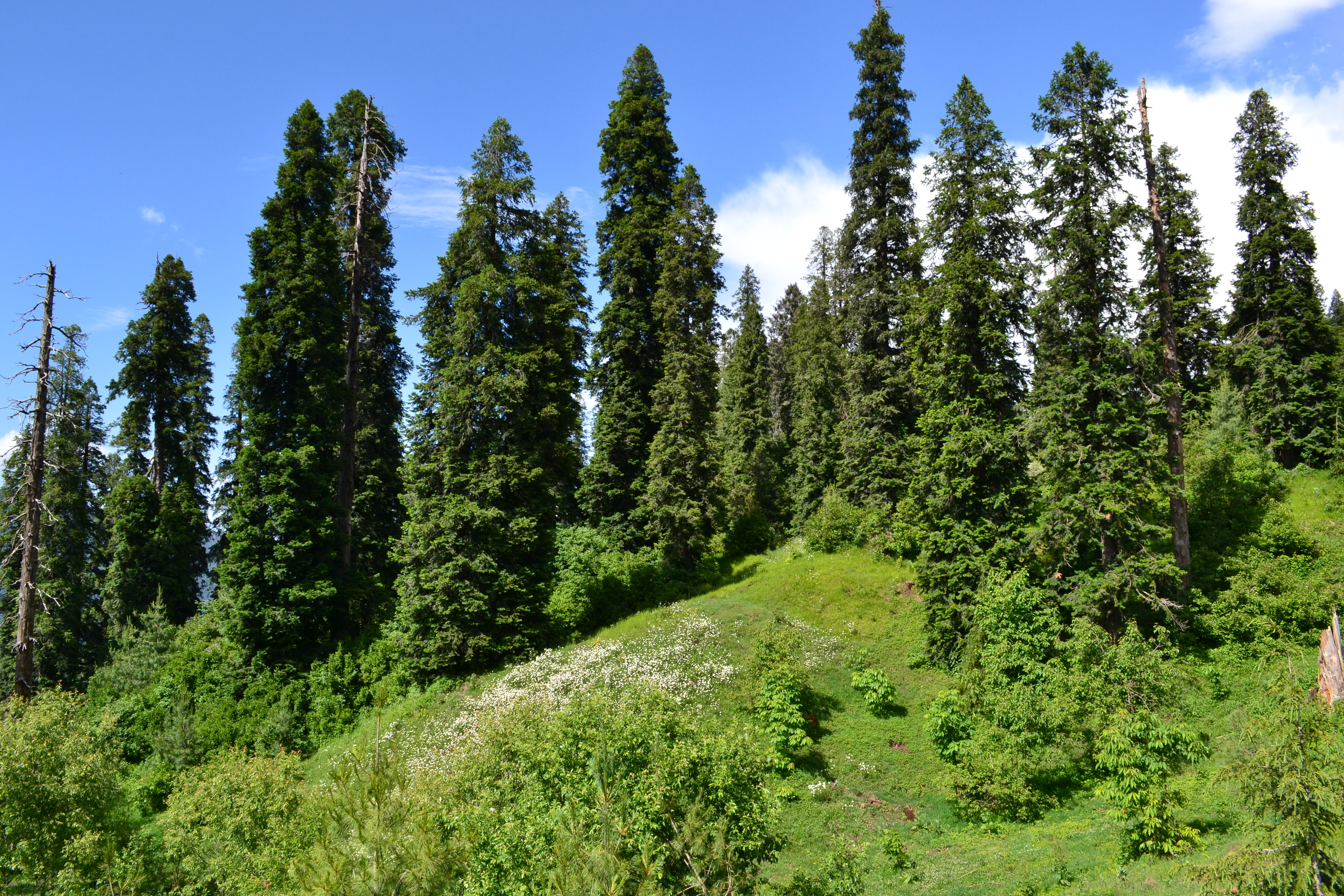
On Mukeshpuri mountain, Pakistan

Abies pindrow grows at altitudes of 2,400–3,700 metres (7,900–12,100 ft) in forests together with Cedrus deodara, Picea smithiana and Pinus wallichiana typically occupying cooler, moister north-facing slopes.

== Uses ==
The pindrow fir is used to a small extent for timber in its native range. It is occasionally grown as an ornamental tree in large gardens in western Europe, but demands high humidity and rainfall to grow well. The name pindrow derives from the tree's name in Nepali.
