= Kullu Valley =

Valley in Himachal Pradesh, India

- Kulu Valley
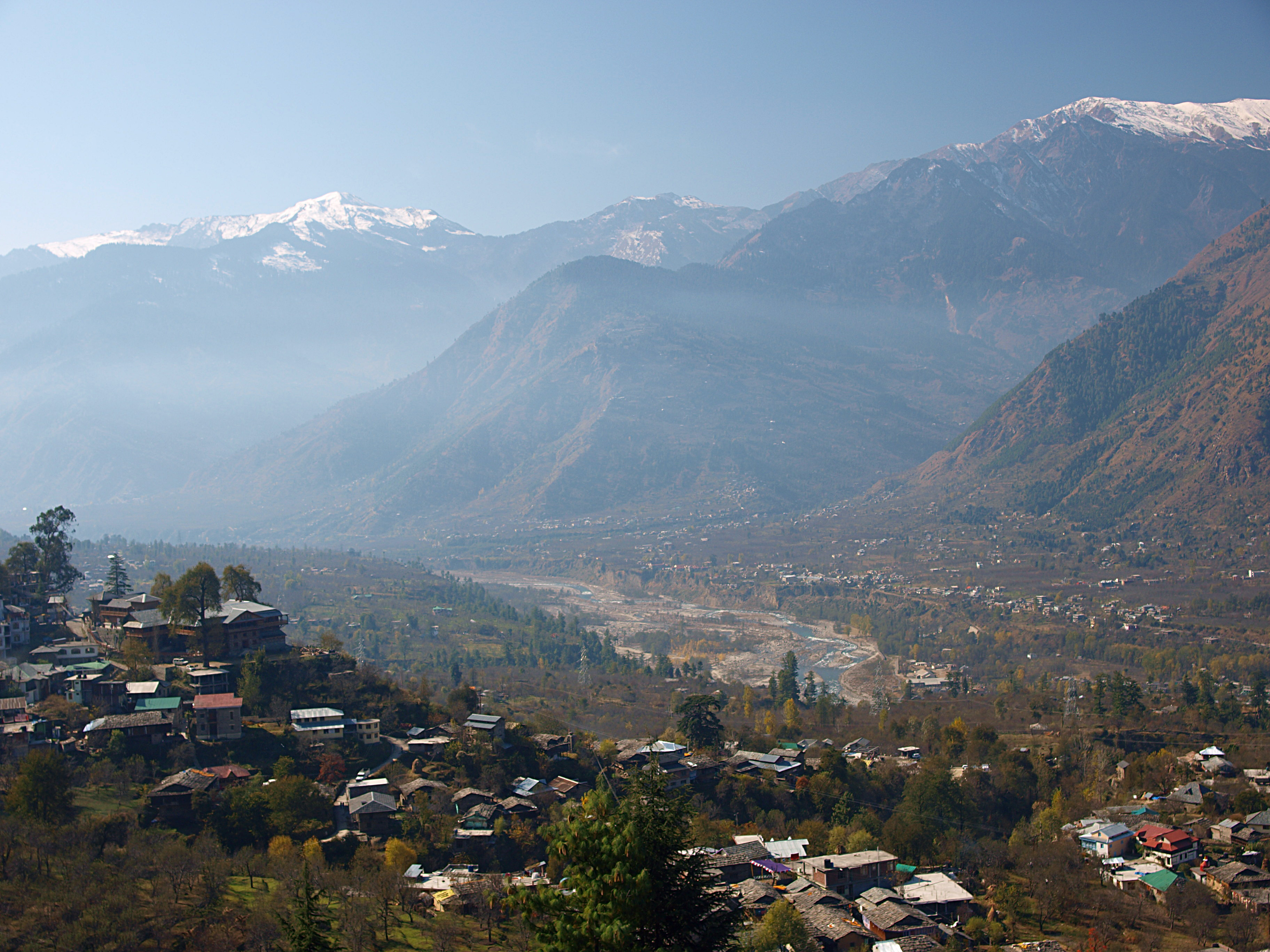
- Kullu Valley

Geology
- Type: River Valley

Geography
- Location: Himachal Pradesh in India
- District: Kullu, Mandi
- Population centers: Kullu, Manali, Bhuntar, Panarsa, Aut
- Coordinates: 31°57′28″N 77°6′34″E
- Rivers: Beas River
- Interactive map of Kullu Valley

Kullu Valley is a broad open valley in Himachal Pradesh, India, formed by the Beas River between Manali and Larji. This valley is famous for its temples, beauty and its majestic hills covered with pine and deodar forests and sprawling apple orchards. Kullu valley is sandwiched between the Pir Panjal, Lower Himalayan and Great Himalayan Ranges. Ski touring is a sport growing in popularity on the Himilayan peaks surrounding the valley.

== Economy ==
See Economy section in Kullu district.

== Tourism ==
For places of interest, festivals, and outdoor sports in the Kullu valley, see Attractions section in Kullu district.

== Gallery ==
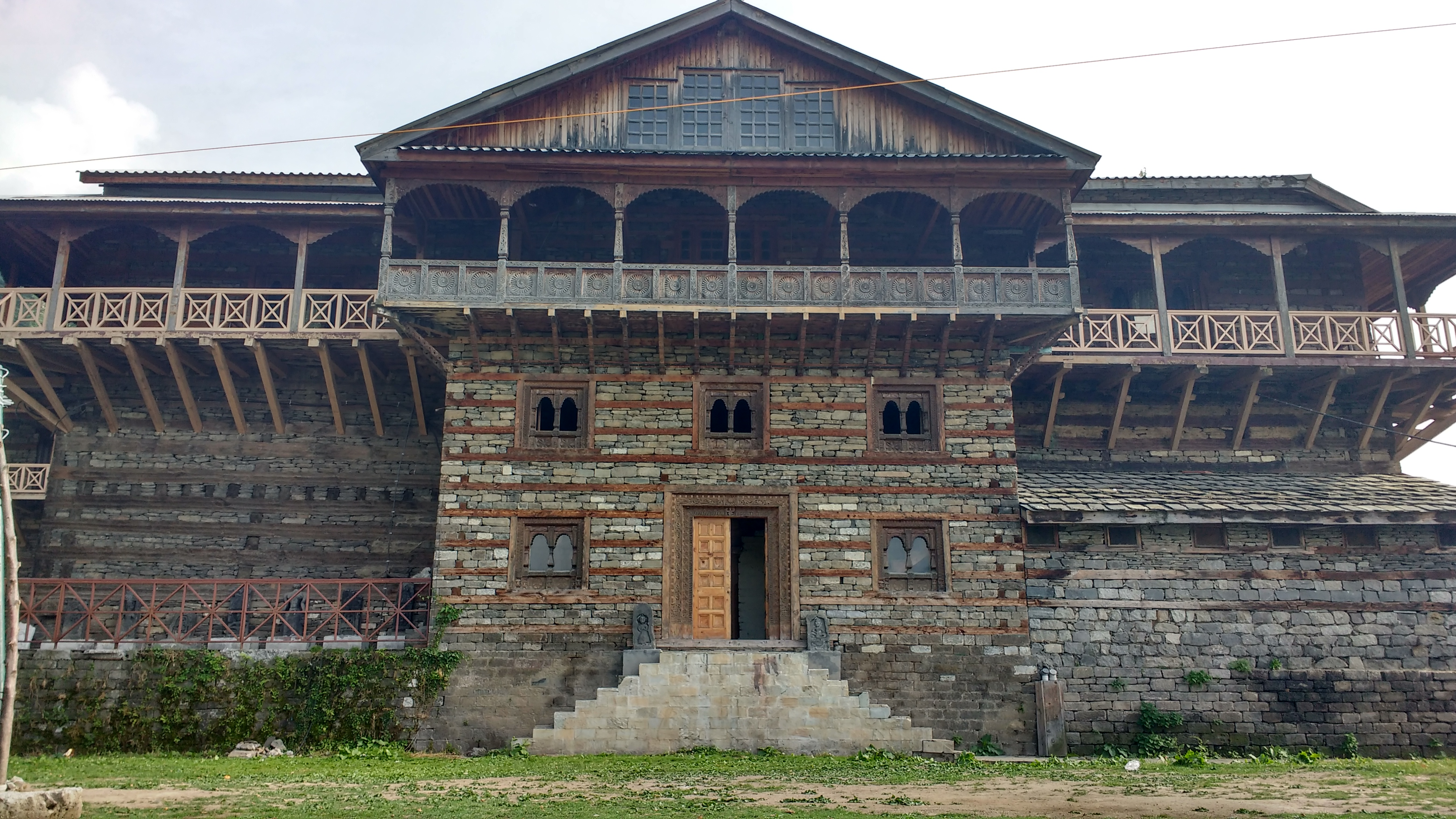
Naggar Castle in Kullu valley

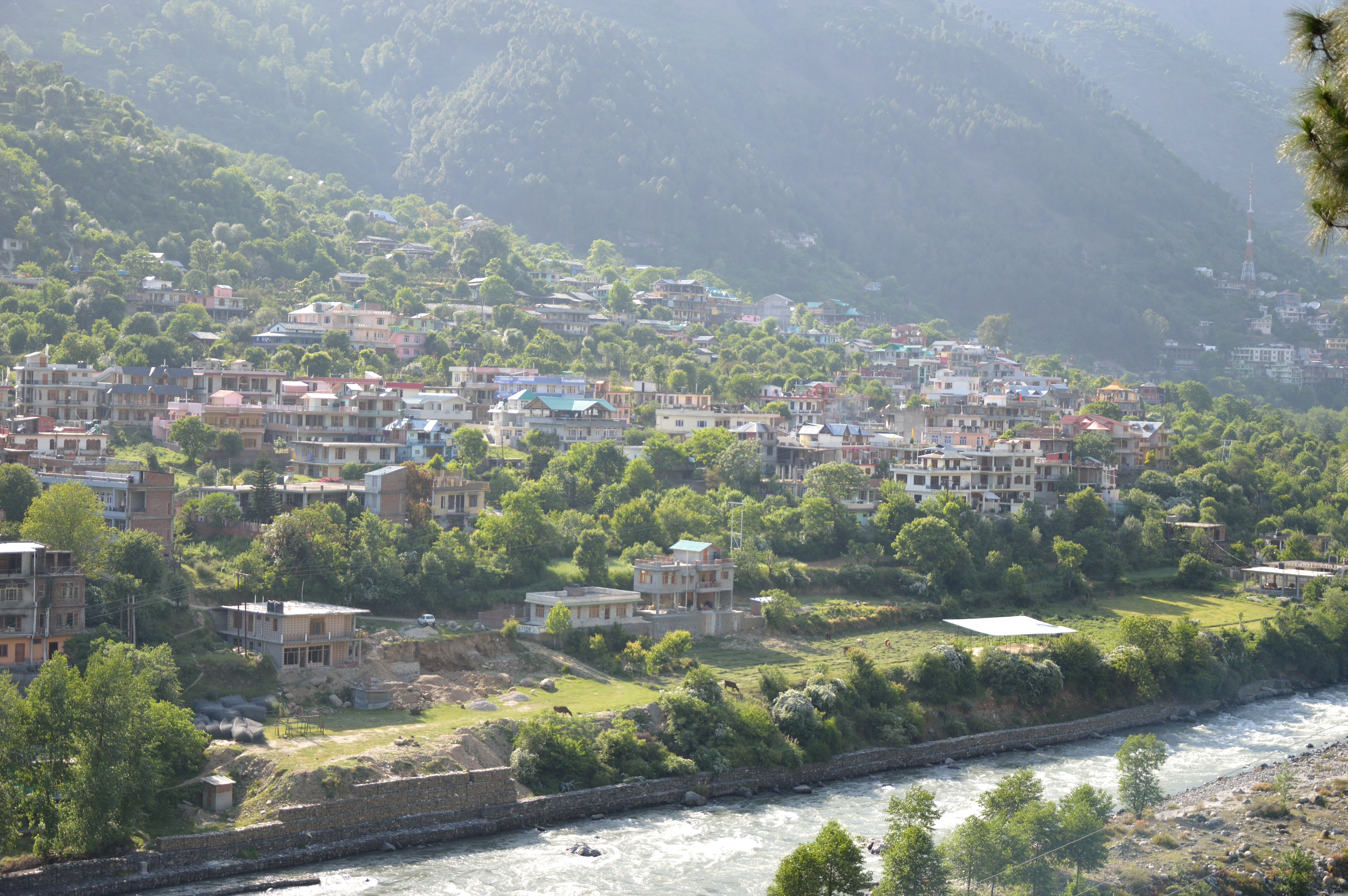
Kullu valley with river Beas

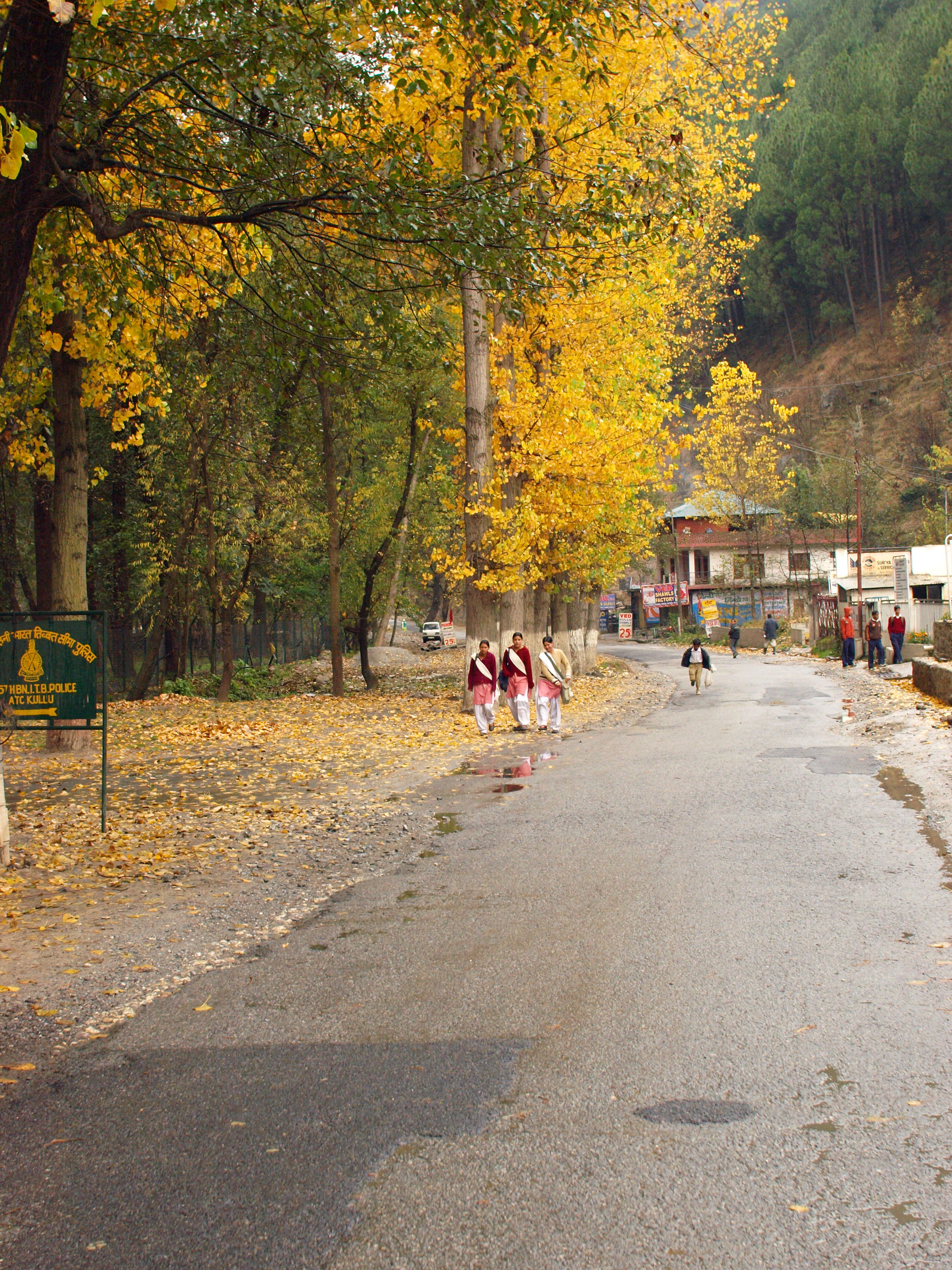
Autumn in Kullu Valley

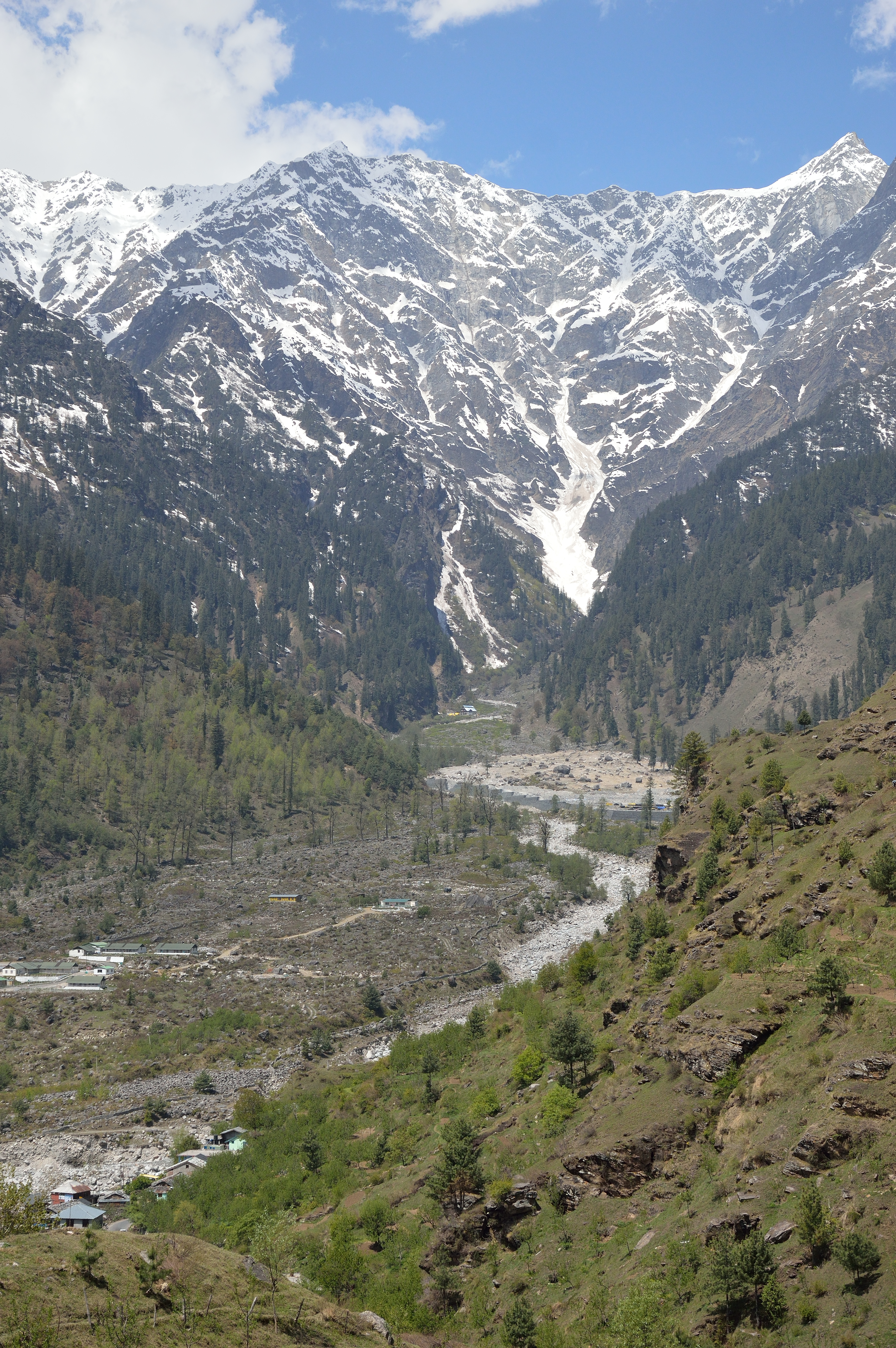
View of Himalayas from Beas river valley in Kullu

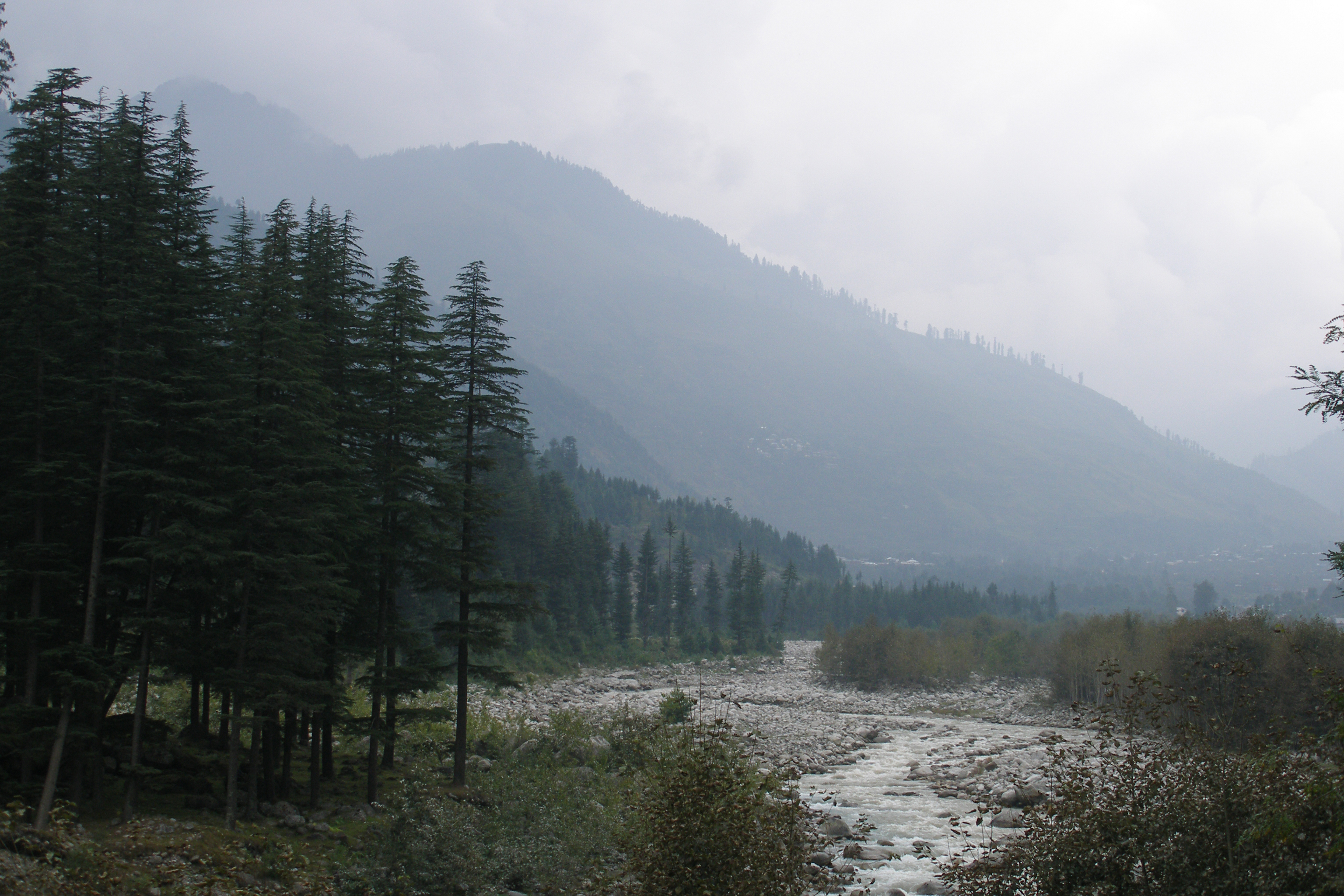
Beas River in September

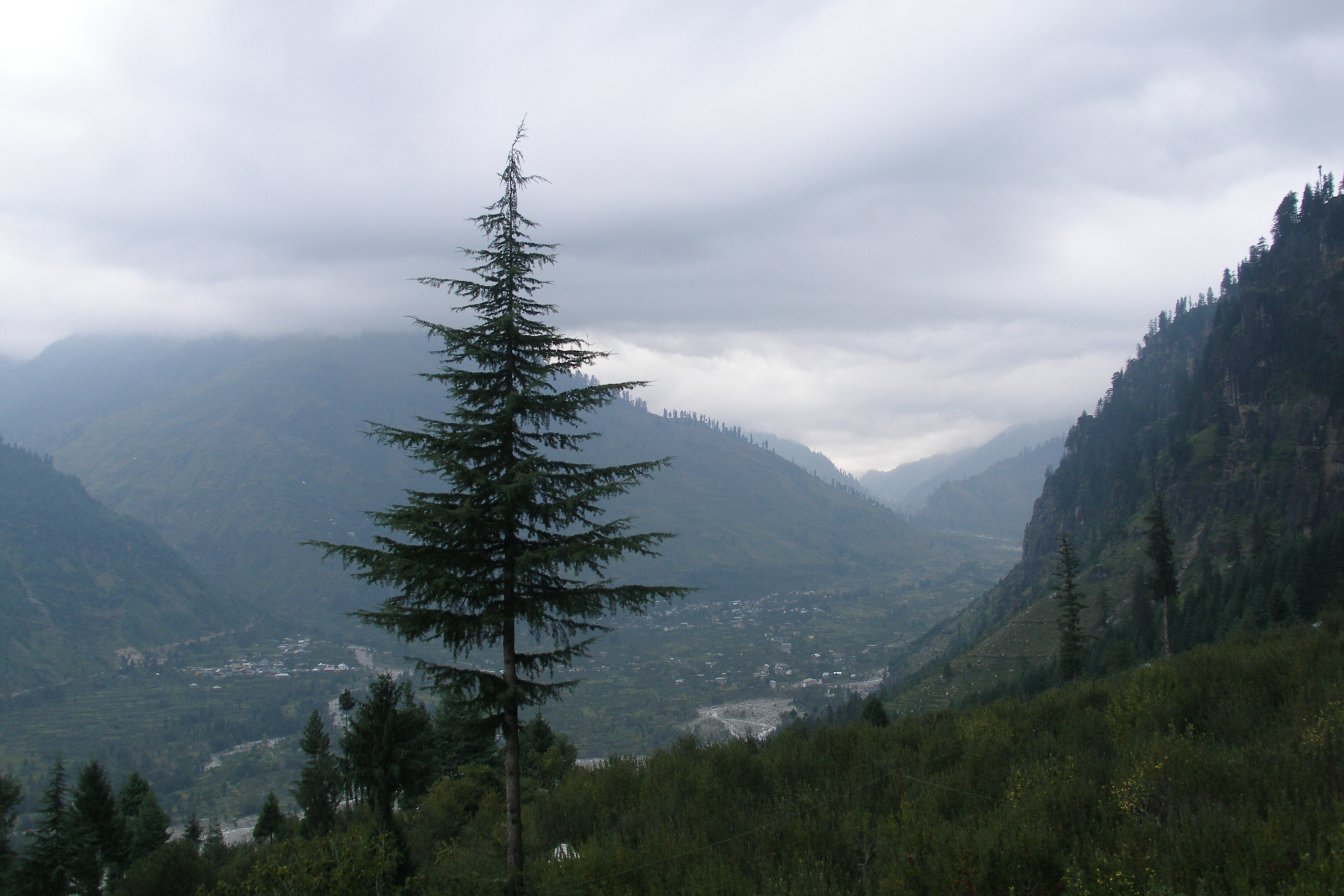
Panoramic view

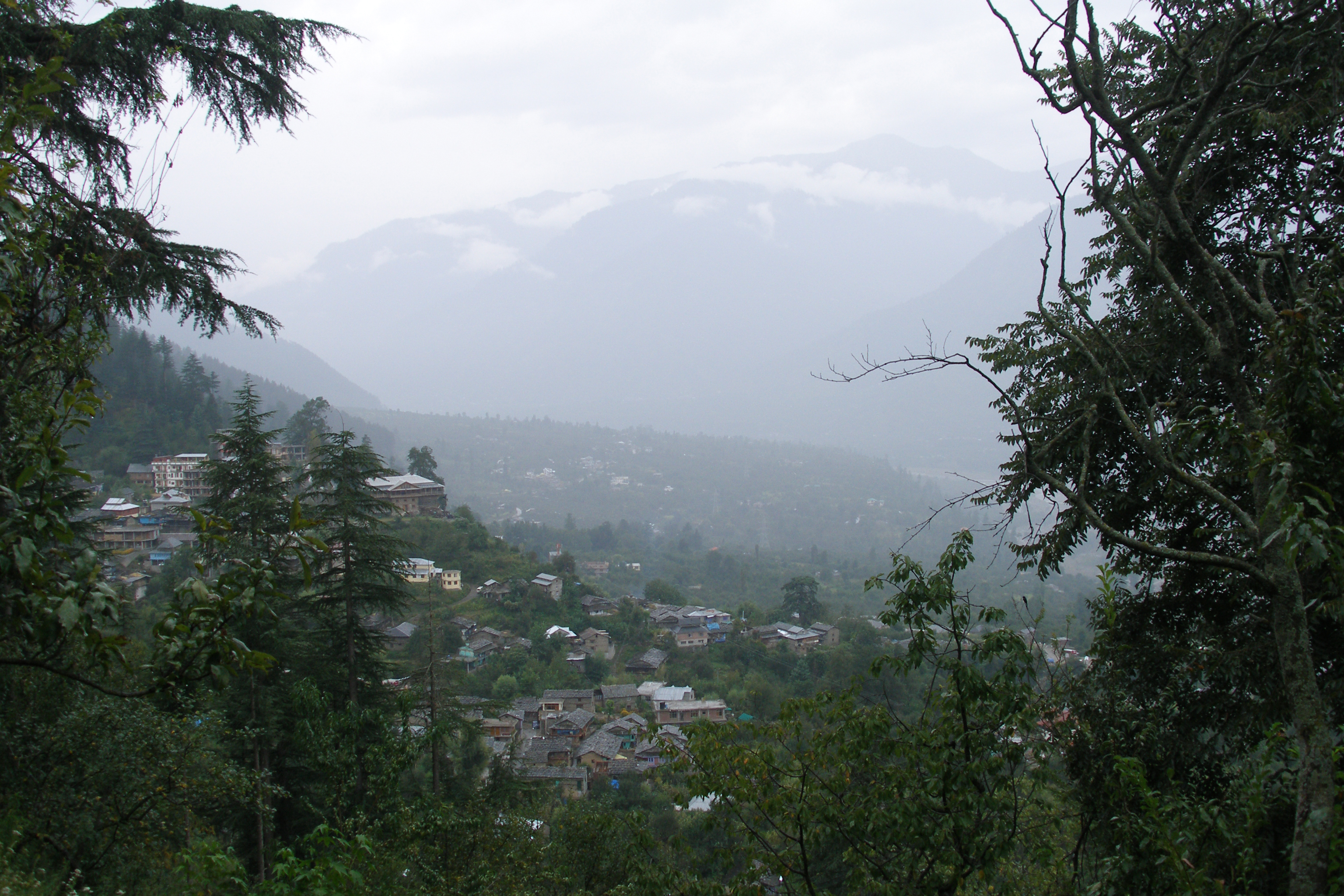
Naggar

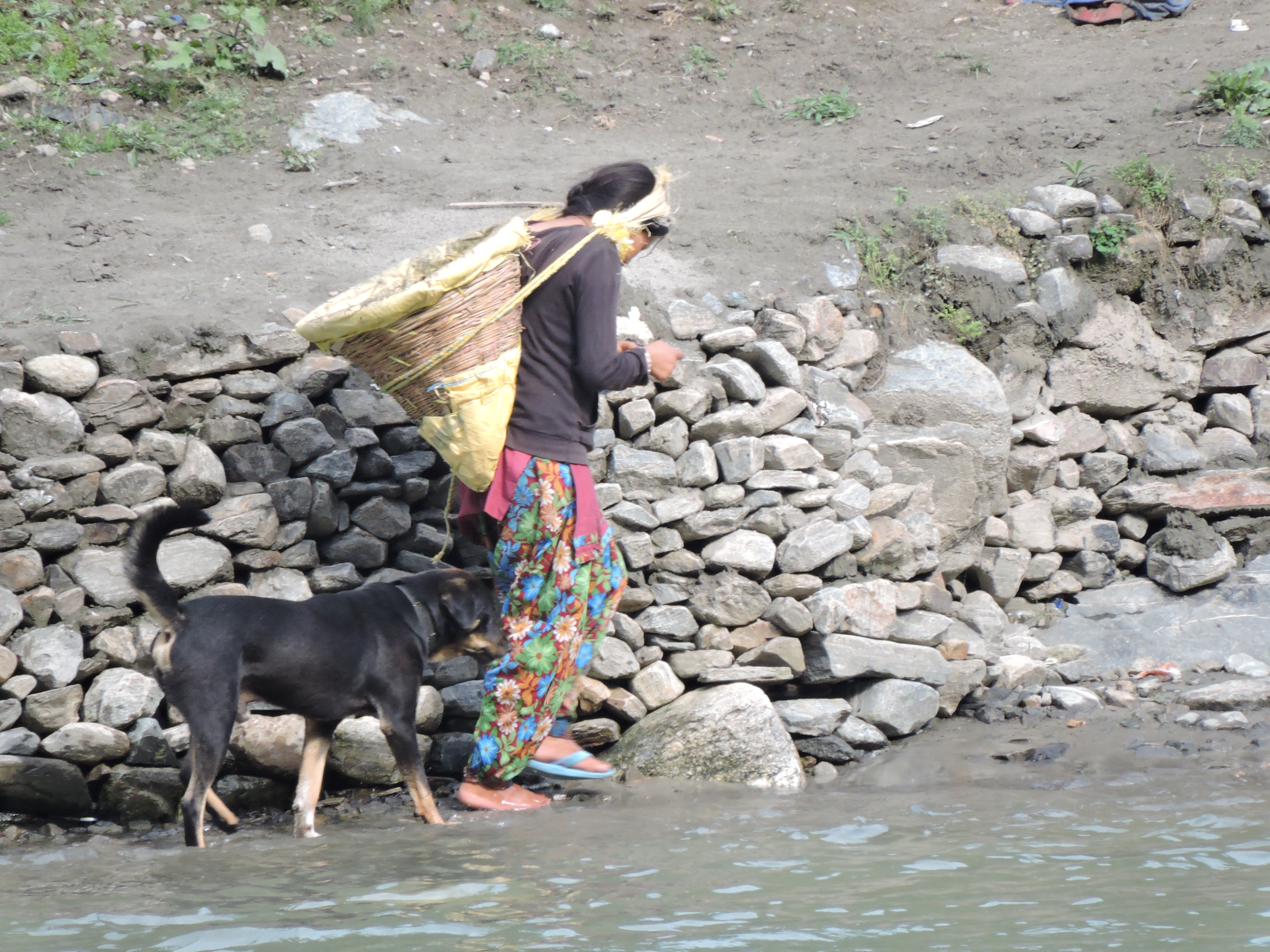
Kullu Girl going alongside river Beas near Kullu, Himachal Pardes, India
