= Uhl River =

Uhl River Tiun Nala
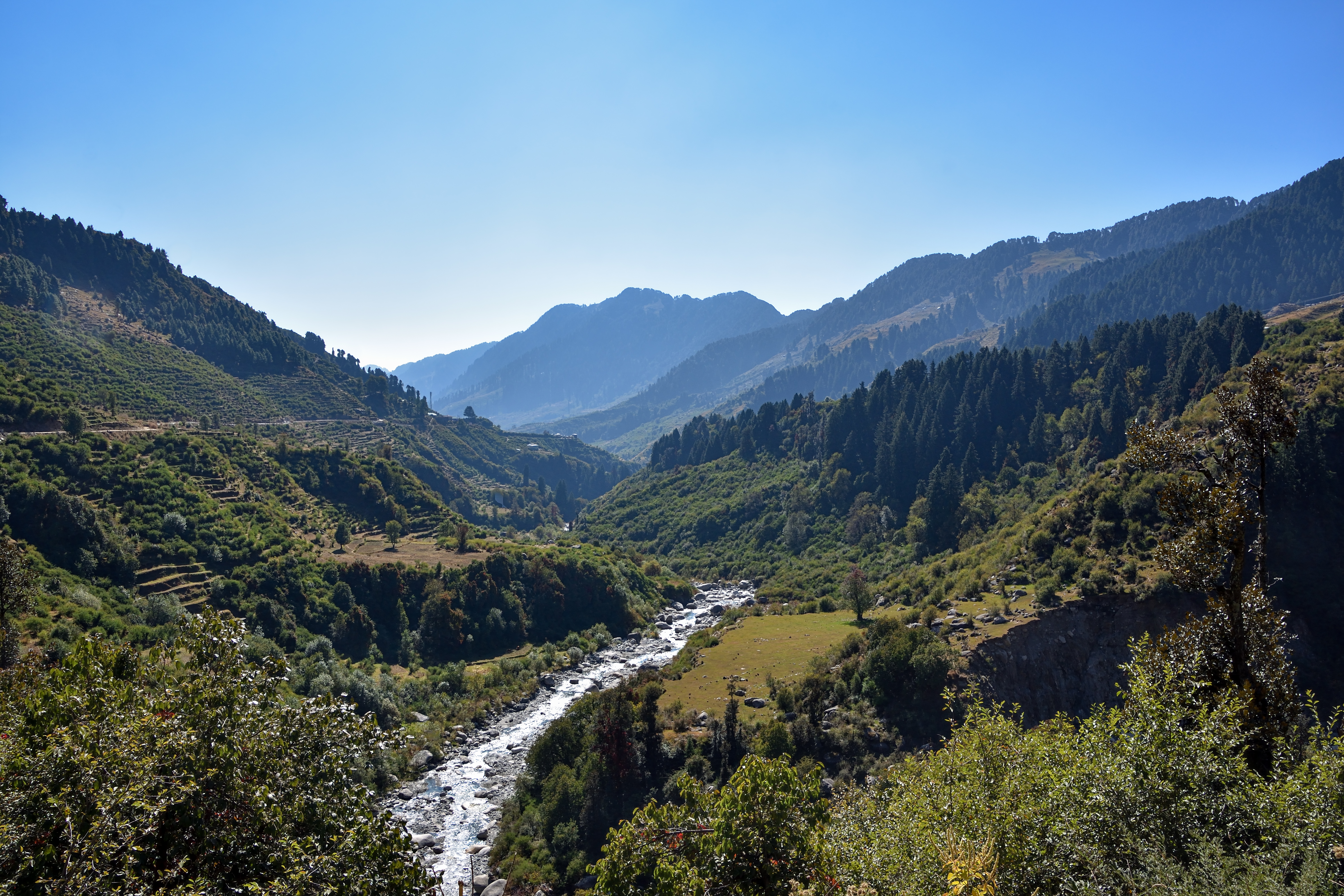
- Uhl down to Baragram

Location
- Country: India
- State: Himachal Pradesh
- Region: Asia
- City: Barot, Kamand in Mandi.

Physical characteristics
- Source: Thamsar Glacier
  - location: Himachal Pradesh, India
- Mouth: Beas River
  - location: 8 km upstream from Mandi, India
  - coordinates: 31°42′58″N 76°59′50″E
  - elevation: 784 m (2,572 ft)

Basin features
- Tributaries
  - left: Lumba Dugh, Bhubhu

The Uhl is a Himalayan river which is part of the watershed of Beas river. The river originates at the Thamsar Glacier in the Dhauladhar range of the Himalayas, flows through the Uhl valley crossing the villages Bada Gran (Baragram) and Barot. In its lower course, it is also known as Tiun Nala and the Uhl valley is known as Chohar valley. After passing the Chohar valley, the Uhl meets the Beas river 5 km downstream from Pandoh.

== Course ==
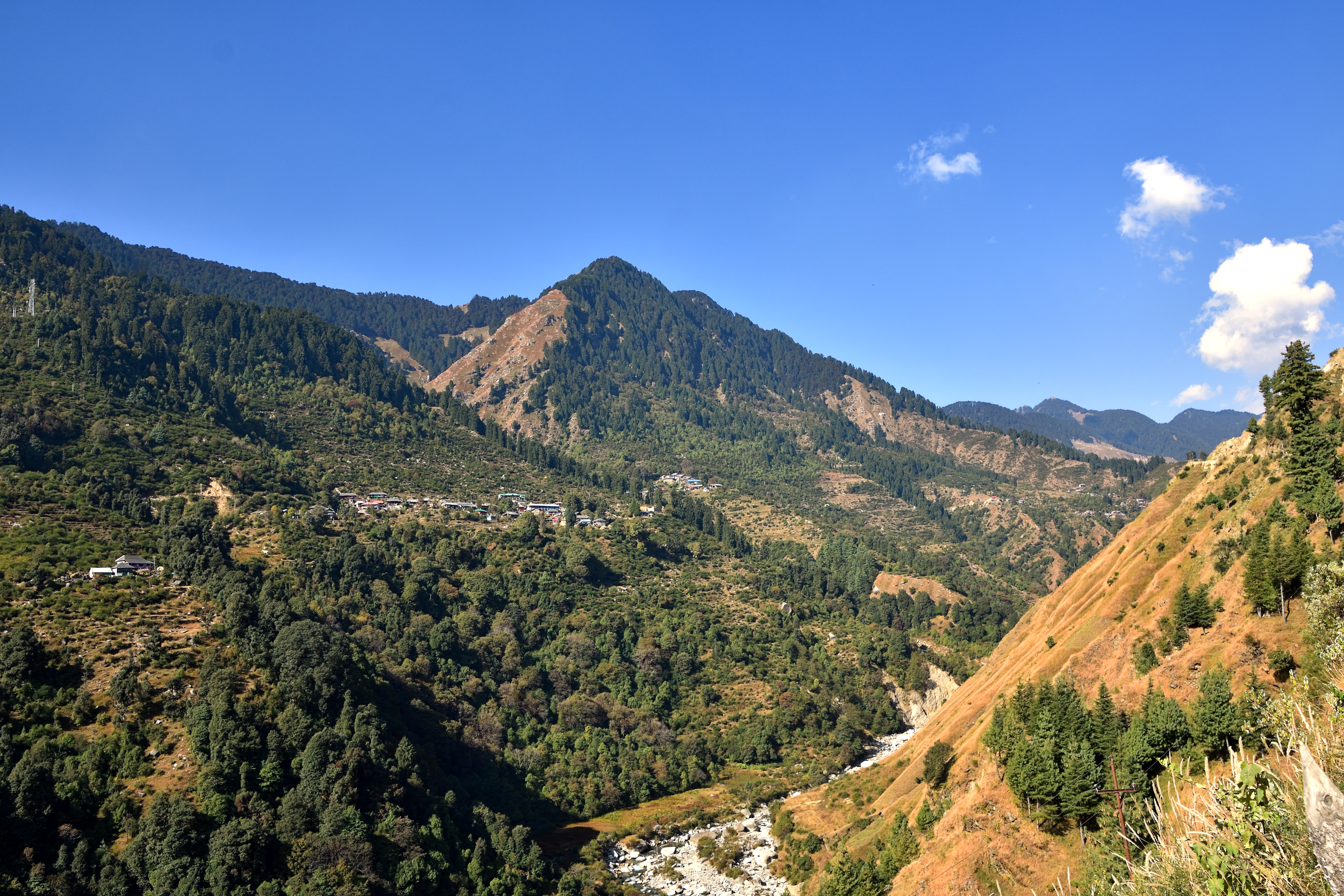
View up the Uhl, Jhajrar Mathi on right bank

The Uhl originates from a lake formed by the Thamsar Glacier in higher Dhauladhar range. The lake is very close to the Thamsar Pass, which lies on the trail to Bada Bhangal. From Thamsar, where it starts as a small mountain stream, the Uhl reaches Palachak, a temporary settlement on the Uhl, where a tributary joins it from the right bank. It crosses Baragram and 18 km downstream at Barot, the Uhl is joined by the Lumba Dugh from the left bank. The Lumba Dugh also originates in the East of the Dhauladhar Range and flows past Luhardi village before meeting the Uhl.

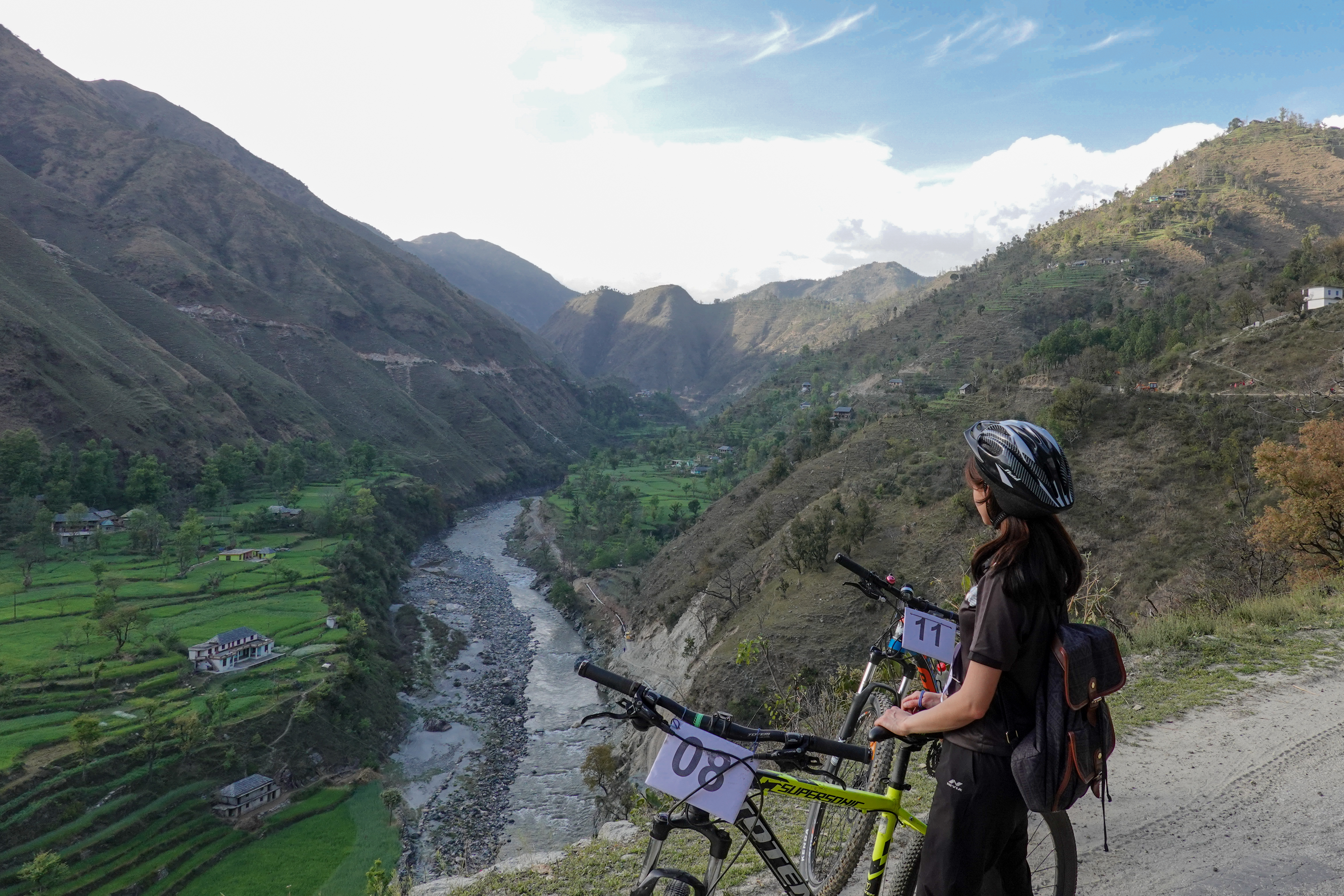
Uhl River Valley near Kamand looking upstream towards Ryagadi, Mar 2019

The permanent campus of the Indian Institute of Technology Mandi, spread over 520 acres (2.1 km^{2}) of land, is located on the left bank of the river Uhl at Kamand (15 km by road from Mandi town).

== Hydroelectric projects ==
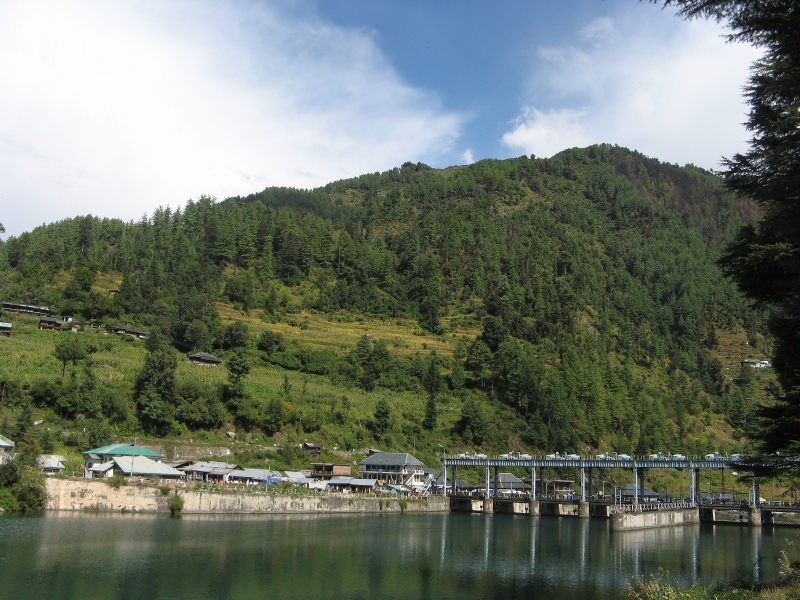
Reservoir at Barot

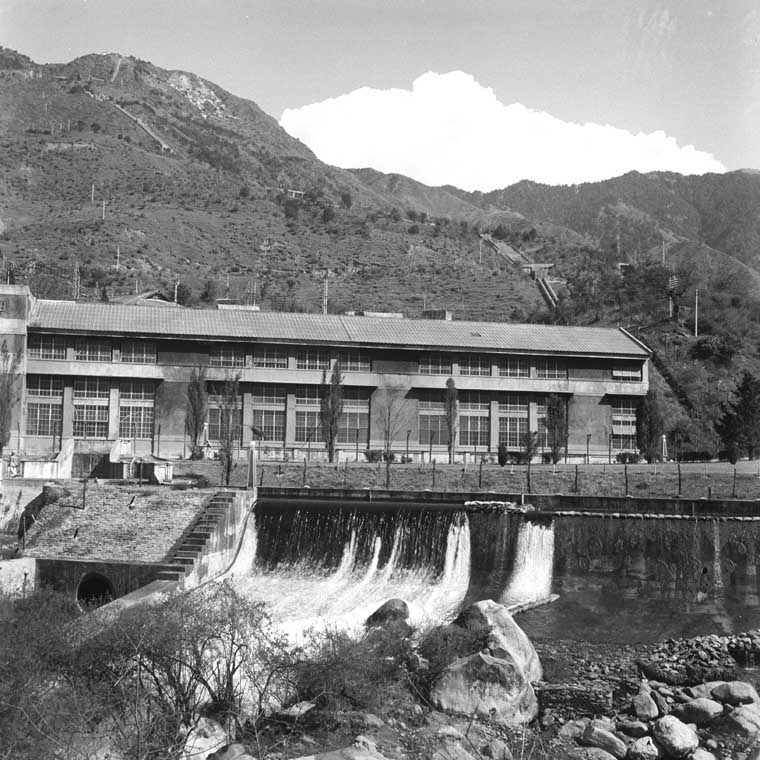
Power station at Jogindernagar

The hydroelectric projects oh Uhl river have been divided in three stages. The Shanan Power House or UHL stage-I, one of the oldest hydel power projects, started by British Rule in India is based on the Uhl. Waters of the Uhl are tapped at Barot in a reservoir using a barrage. This water is then diverted to the Shanan Power House, Jogindernagar using a tunnel and penstocks, where it runs turbines for electricity generation.
Another set of turbines is added at Bassi, a small village situated at the bottom of Chapprot hill and Bassi Power House (66 MW) or UHL stage-II comes into existence. Bassi Power House is the producer of cheapest hydro-electricity (since the project is based on tail-water of Shanan project).
The construction of third stage of project, Uhl Stage III (100 MW), was inaugurated at village Chulla near Tullah with two reservoir, one near the Machhyal Lake and another at Raktal village near Chulla, is currently under progress. The vision of the hydel project scheme was to construct five power stations using the same water that is drawn from the Uhl river.

== Angling ==
Of late, with the introduction of trout in the Indian Himalayan region, fish farms have come up on the banks of Uhl at Barot. There is a government run trout breeding farm and several privately owned trout farms. The angling season runs from the end of August to the end of October annually.

== Gallery ==
Images of the Uhl River ordered from its source to the mouth.

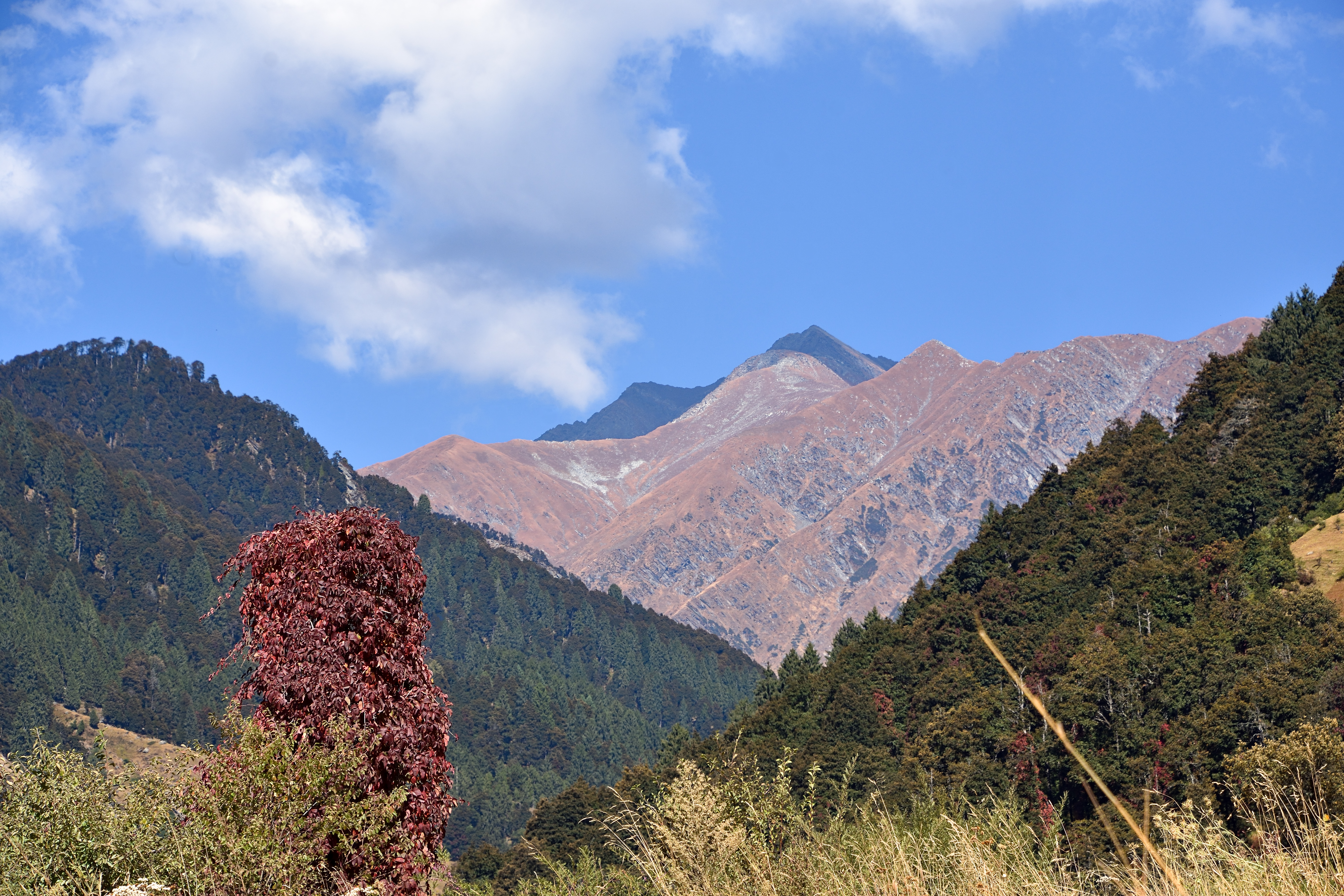
Fall colours above Baragram, Oct '20

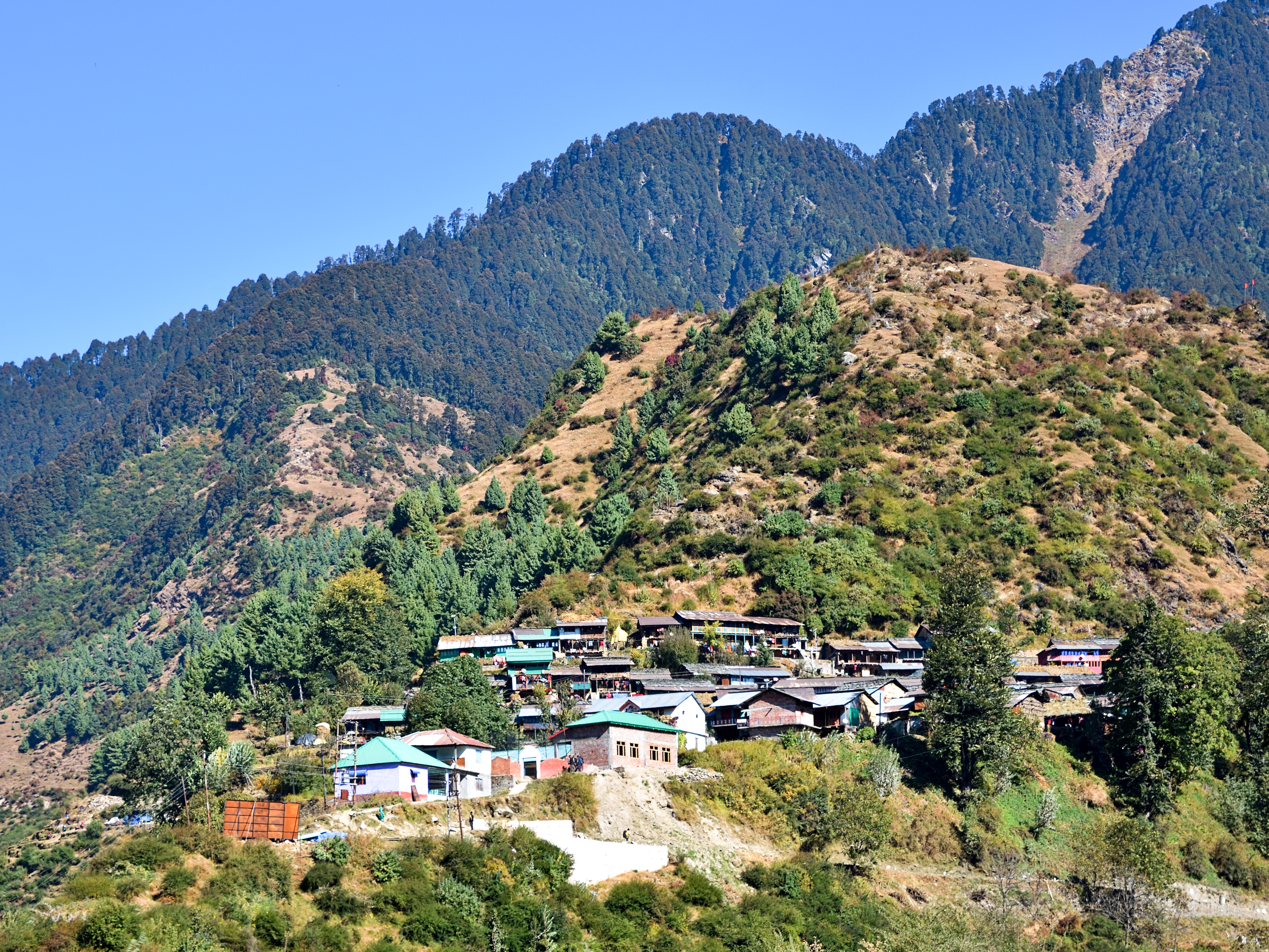
Baragram village, Kangra, Oct '20

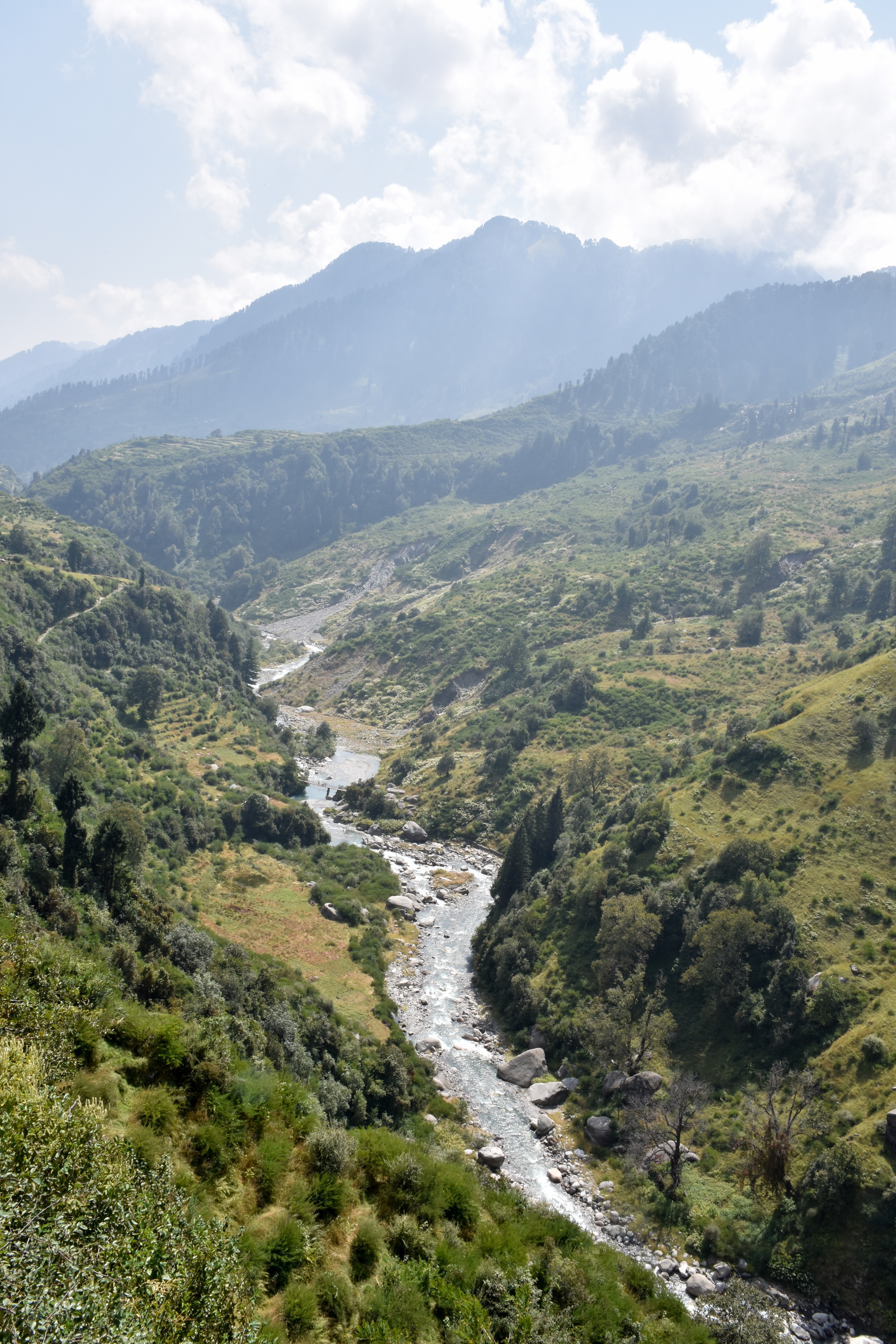
Downstream from Baragram, Oct '17

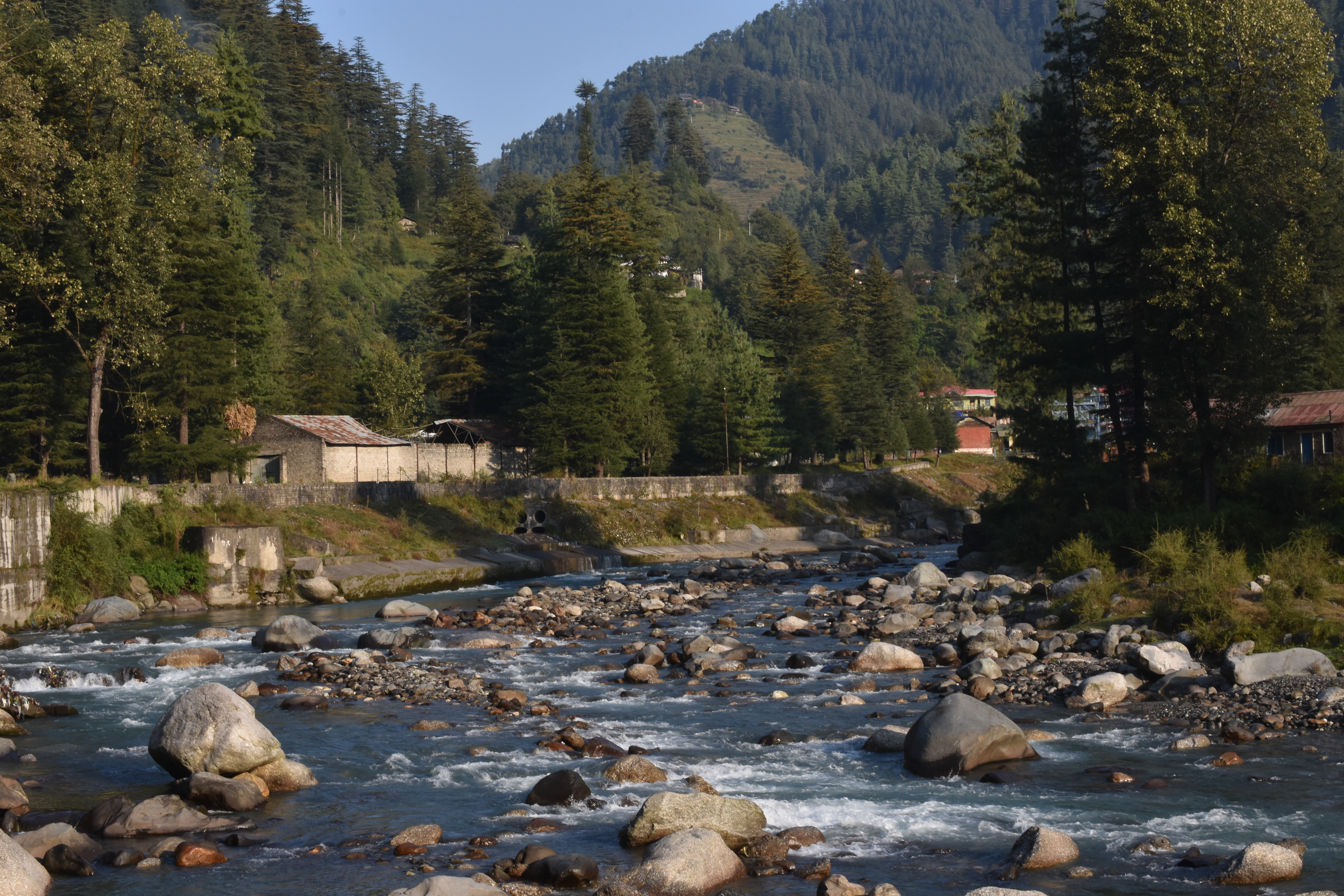
Flowing through Barot, Oct '17

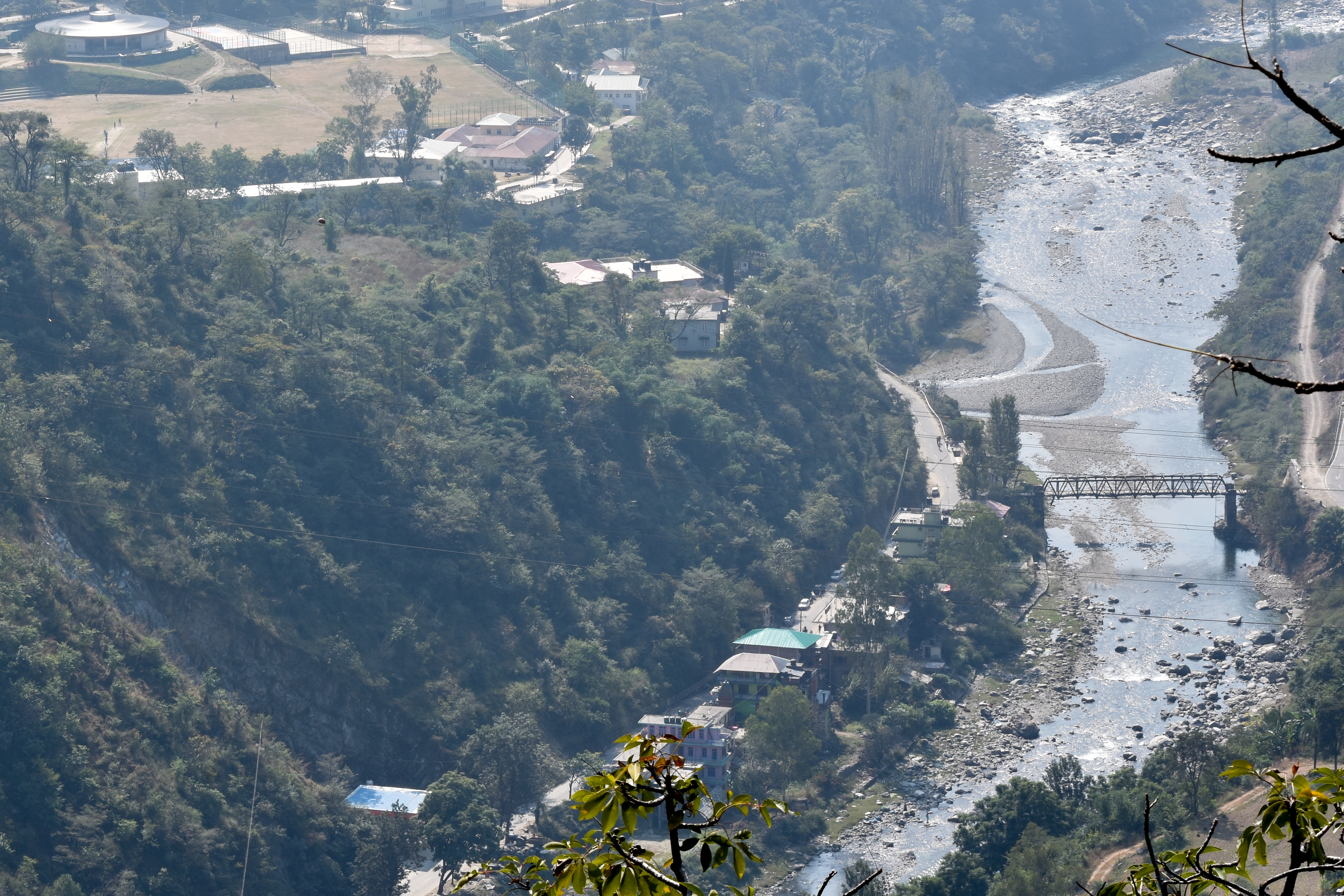
Kamand village & IIT Mandi, Oct '17

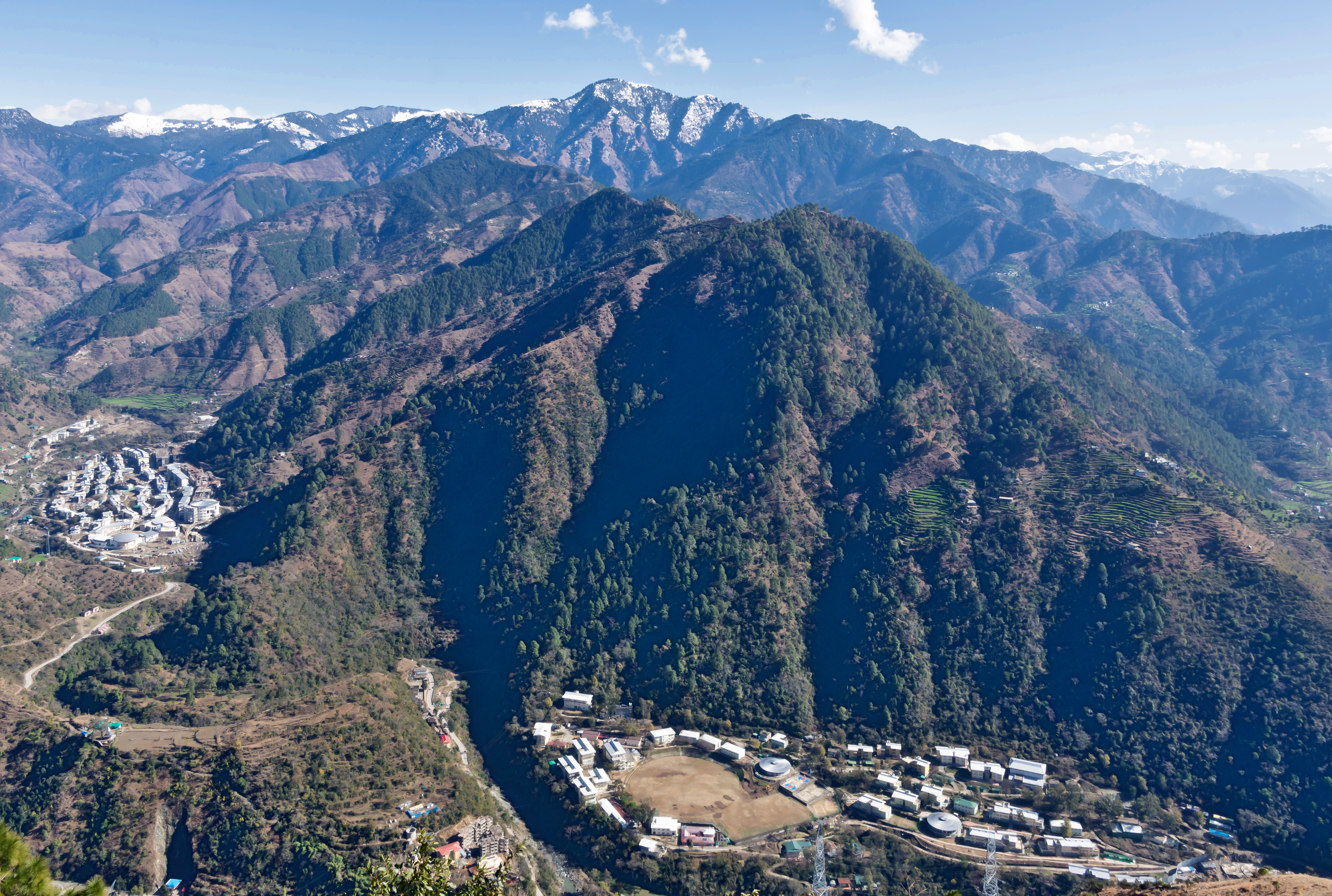
IIT Mandi on left bank, Jan '20

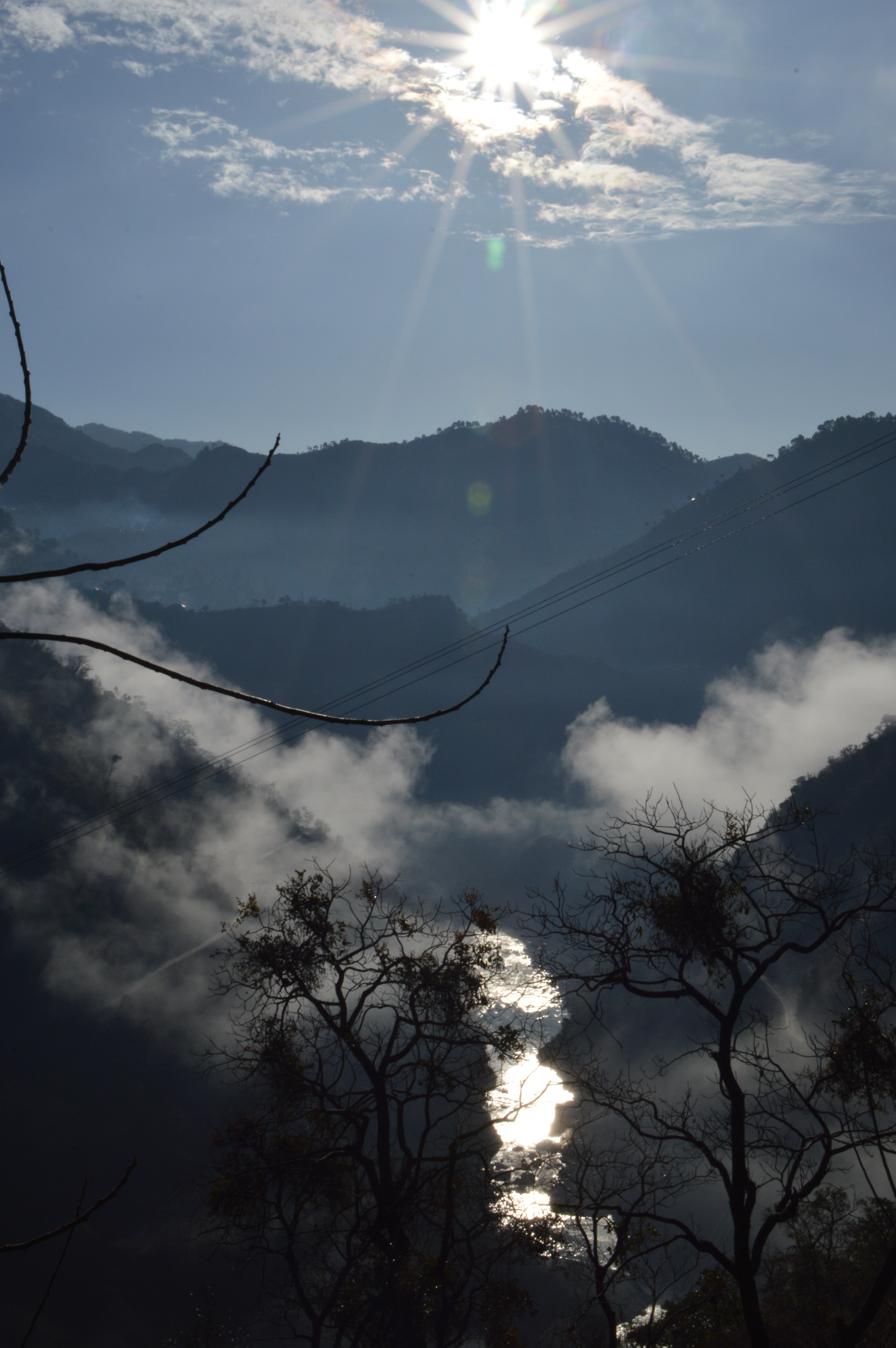
To Peepul Point, IIT Mandi, Jan '14
