= Barot, Himachal Pradesh =

Barot
- Town Valley
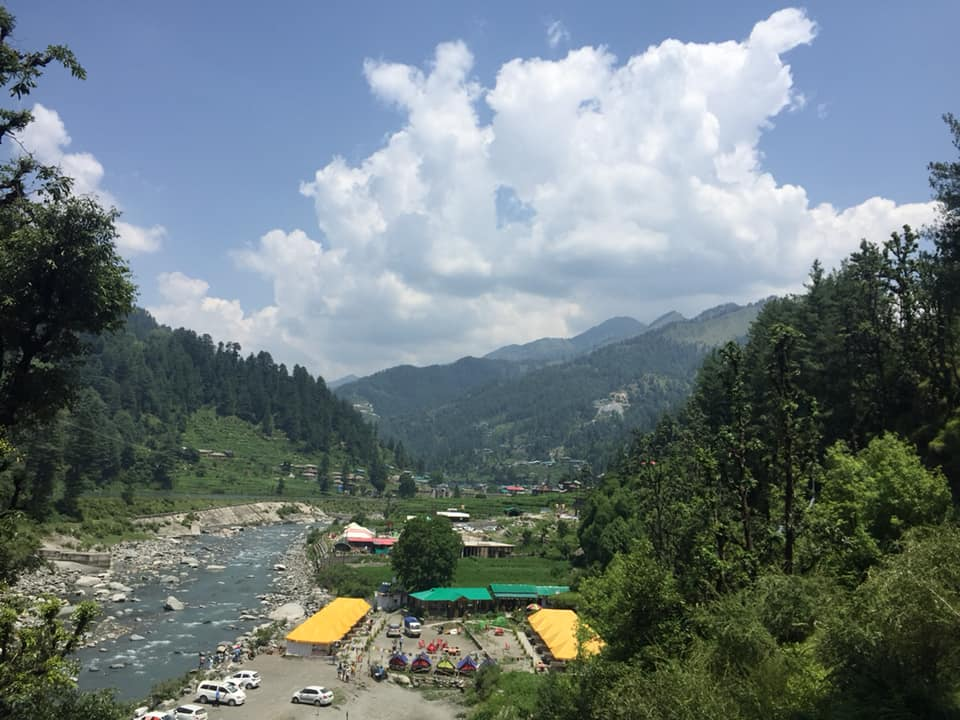
- View of Barot Valley in June 2019

- Location in Himachal Pradesh, India Barot (India)
- Coordinates: 32°2′11″N 76°50′51″E
- Country: India
- State: Himachal Pradesh
- District: Mandi
- Elevation: 1,829 m (6,001 ft)

Population
  - Total: 3,500 (app.)

Languages
  - Official: Hindi
  - Regional: Kullui (Lagali)
- Time zone: UTC+5:30 (IST)
- PIN: 175013
- Telephone code: 1908 (Joginder Nagar)
- Vehicle registration: HP- HP 29 (Joginder Nagar) HP 76 (Padhar)
- Nearest city: Joginder Nagar
- Lok Sabha constituency: Mandi
- Vidhan Sabha constituency: Drang-30
- Climate: Cold (Köppen)
- Avg. annual temperature: 13 °C (55 °F)
- Avg. summer temperature: 17 °C (63 °F)
- Avg. winter temperature: 5 °C (41 °F)

Barot, a village originally developed in the 1920s for Shanan Hydro Project, is now a tourist location in Mandi district in the Indian state of Himachal Pradesh. Barot was difficult to access until 1975, when a road was opened. It is situated 40 km from Jogindernagar and 65 km from Mandi, the district headquarter. The road to Barot branches off at Jogindernagar-Mandi Highway and from Jogindernagar the distance is 40 km. It is sometimes possible to use the funicular trolley from Jogindernagar which reduces the distance to 12 km. The road route includes terraced fields and thick cedar forests, rising to Jhatingri at the hilltop. The remains of the summer palace of the former rulers of Mandi are located here. Through the small village of Tikkan, the road carries on to Barot. The town has a range of outdoor activities, including a trout breeding centre, from where fish are released into the Uhl river. A 30 km section of the river is used for angling.

Barot also forms the gateway to the Nargu Wildlife Sanctuary which lies across the Uhl. The sanctuary is home to the monal, black bear and ghoral. Within it are forest rest houses at Thaltuckhod and Silbandhwari. Through woods of cedar and pine a trek route cuts across the sanctuary to Kullu.

== Shanan Hydel Project ==
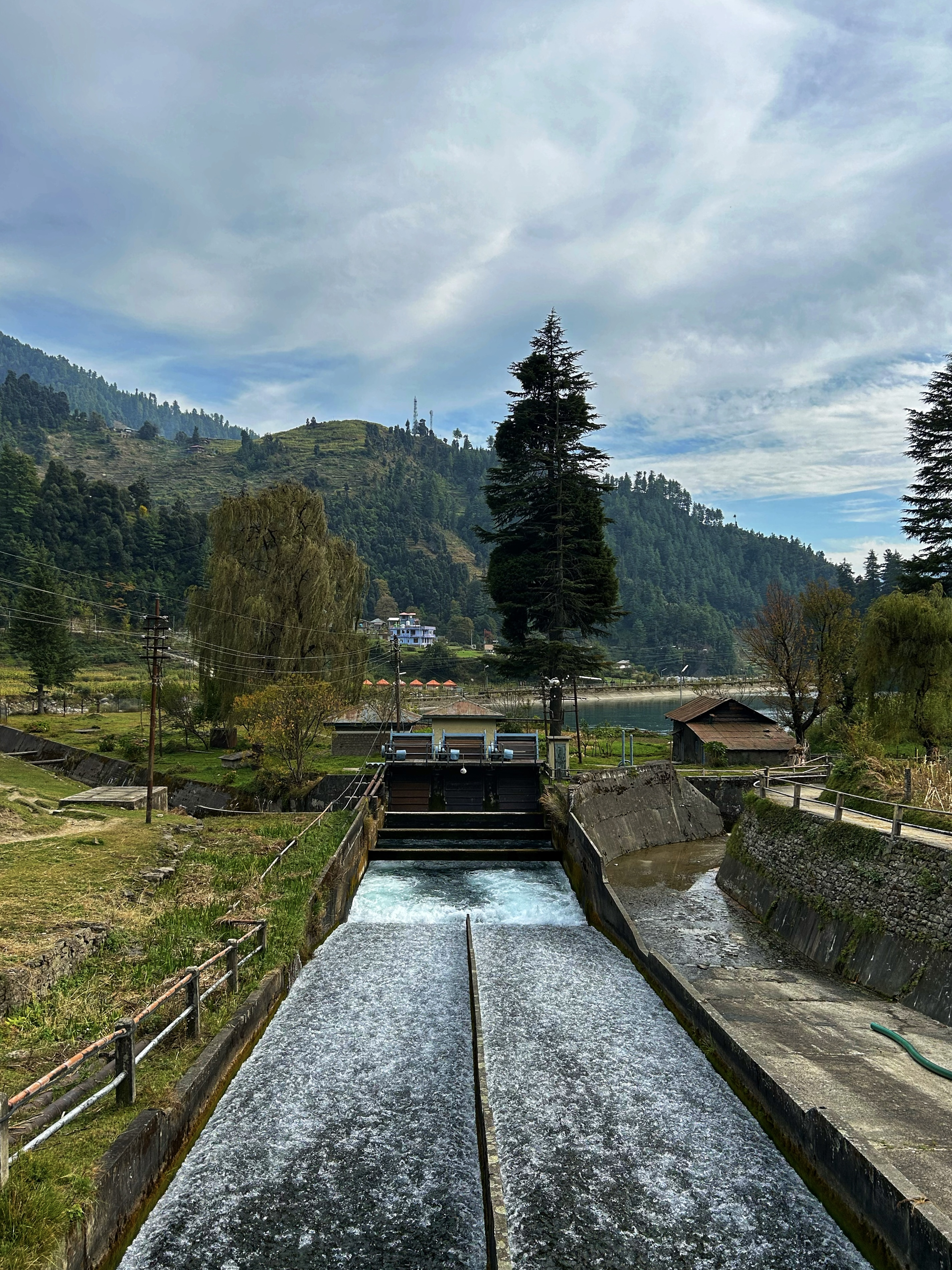
Dam in Barot Valley

Barot is the inlet point of the tunnel that diverts river water of Uhl river to Shanan Power House in Jogindernagar. The town has a diversion dam that was commissioned in 1932. The funicular trolley system was built during construction to connect Barot with Jogindernagar. The project workers live in the Punjab State Electricity Board (PSEB) colony in Barot.

== Accessibility ==
=== By road ===
Barot is situated 25 km off National Highway 20. The diversion to Barot is from a village, Ghatasani, on the Mandi-Jogindernagar road, 40 km from Joginder Nagar and 65 km from Mandi. This Ghatasni-Barot road passes through Jhatingri and Tikkan. From Tikkan, the road runs along the Uhl river till Barot. A major portion of this road is single lane, though not one way.

Barot is connected by public buses to Mandi, Jogindernagar and Palampur. Buses plying to Kothikodh, Bada Gran and Luhardi also pass through Barot.

=== Railway ===
The closest railway station is at Jogindernagar, terminus of the narrow gauge railway line connecting Jogindernagar to Pathankot. The line is operated by Northern Railways, a division of Indian Railways.

=== By Air ===
By air from Delhi to Bhunter (Kullu) or Gaggal (Kangra) airport and then by road to Barot.

=== Other Modes of Transport ===
The funicular trolley system connecting Barot with Jogindernagar built during the construction of the Shanan Hydel project and was the only access until the road was opened in 1975. This trolley link was set up to facilitate transport of construction material to Barot for a reservoir on Uhl river for Shanan Power House. However, once the road connection was established, the trolley fell into a state of disrepair. It is currently owned and maintained by the Punjab State Electricity Board. Currently, the trolley is not in use and is only operated for occasional inspections of the penstocks.

== History ==
Historically, Barot formed part of the Mandi riyasat before and during British times and was governed by the King of Mandi. Pre Independence, Barot was also on the mule trail connecting Kullu valley to Kangra valley. The importance of this route declined once Kullu was connected to a road from Mandi.

== Geography ==
Barot is situated in a small valley formed by the Uhl river. Surrounded on both sides by parts of the Dhauladhar range of the Himalayas, Barot is located at an elevation of 1819 metres (6001 ft) above the mean sea level. Most of the village is settled along the banks of Uhl river. The Uhl barrage and reservoir for the Shanan Power House are a major geographical feature of Barot. Most of the forest around Barot is deodar and Himalayan oak.

== Tourism ==
Barot is a frequent backpacker and day tourist destination. Many trekking trails pass through Barot, including trails to Bada Bhangal via Thamsar Pass, Dehnasar Lake, Manali and Kullu. Most tourists are attracted by the serene surroundings and availability of cheap accommodation.

Of late, Barot is also developing into an angling destination. The Uhl river supports trout breeding and Barot has a few fish farms. Across the river Uhl is the Nargu Wildlife Sanctuary, home to goral, Himalayan black bear and a variety of pheasants; three artificial lakes including one reservoir on Uhl river can be seen as one enters the Barot village near Dhrangan. An old fountain channelising the waters of Uhl erupting at regular intervals is a source of attraction. Just opposite the fountain, two centres of religious faith are situated. One is the temple of Dev Pashakot, the local deity of rain whereas the other is old temple which have been the witness to majority of couples of valley getting tied in marital bonds. The Thandi Golai ground on the way to old Mayot road is the camp site for various trekkers organised by the trekking organisers. Rulling, the highest village in Mandi district is just an hour's uphill trek falling in Lapas panchayat.

== See also ==
- Shanan Power House
- Uhl River
- Thamsar Pass
- Dehnasar Lake

=== Gallery ===
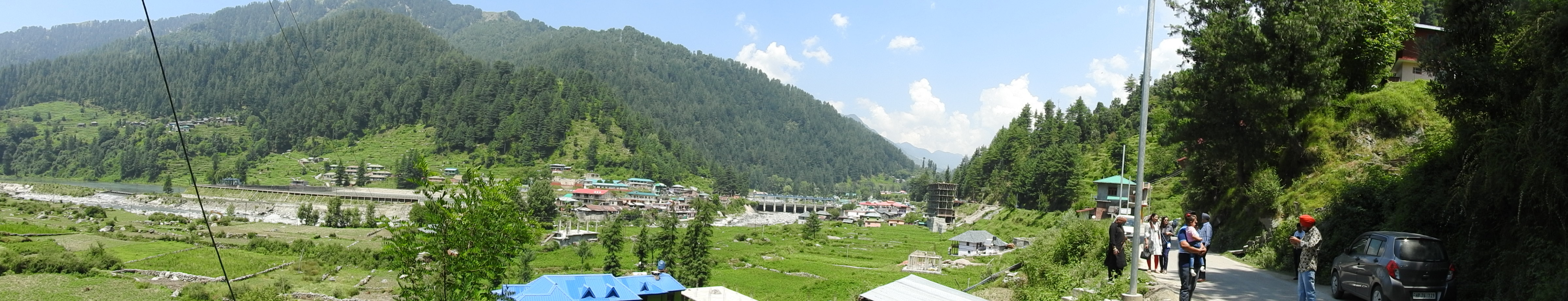
Panoramic view of Barot Valley

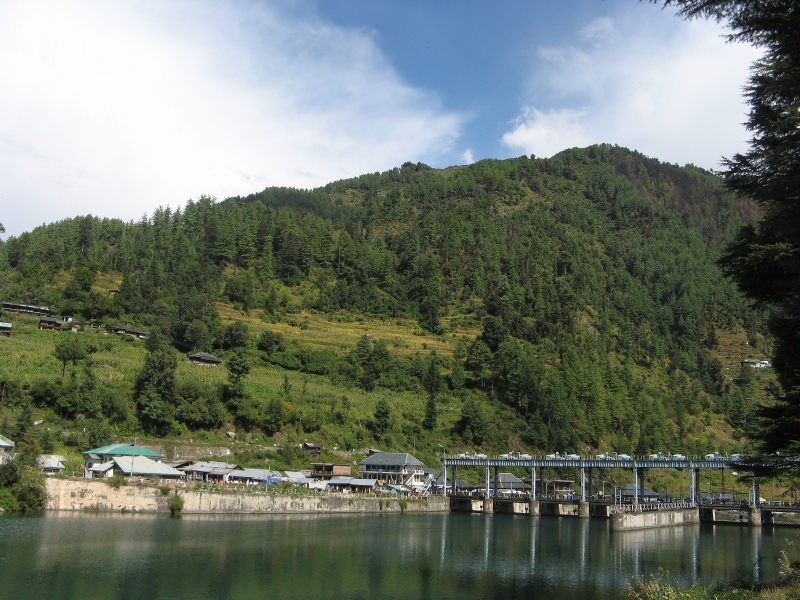
Barot from across the Uhl reservoir

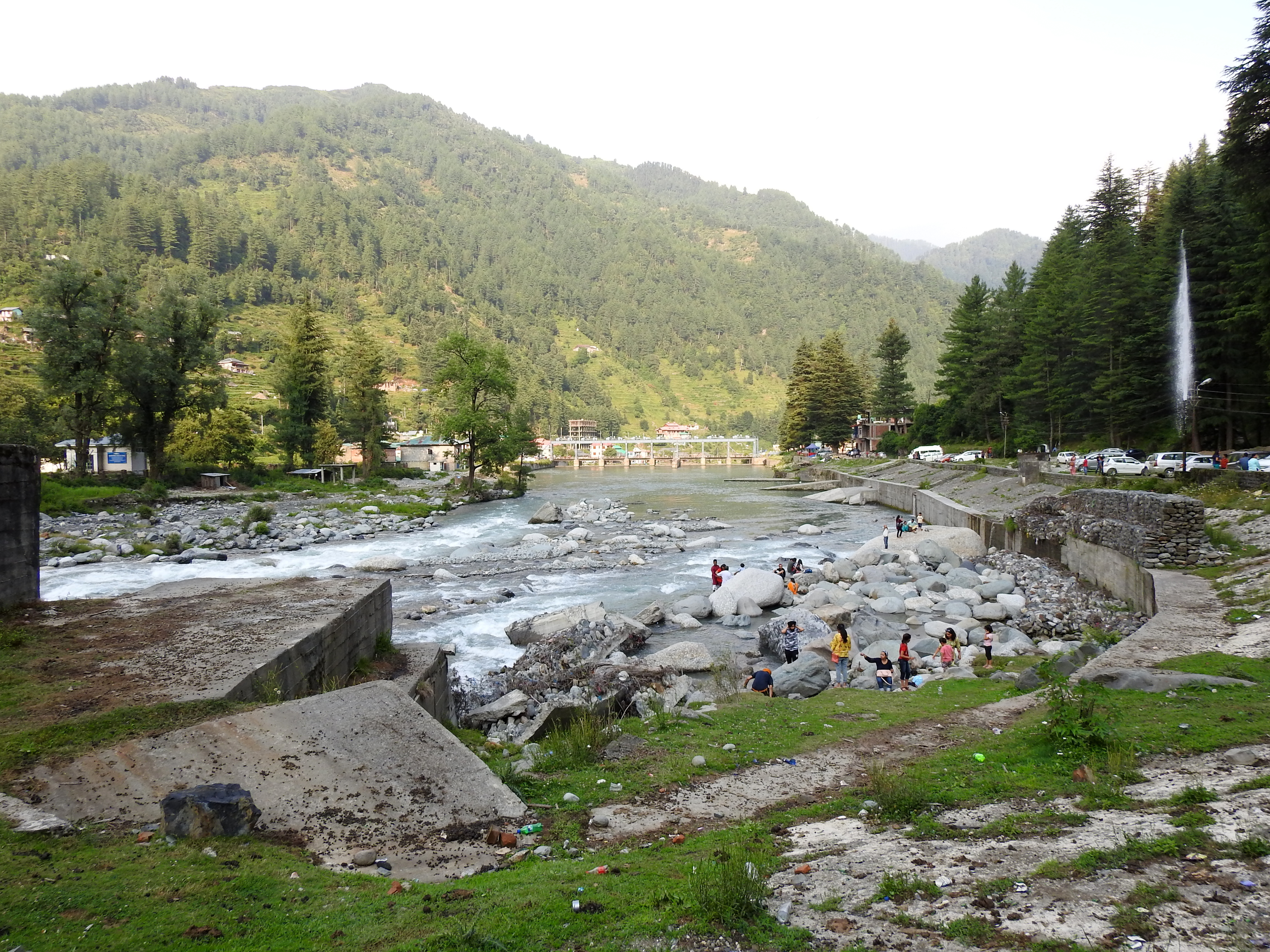
View of Barot valley

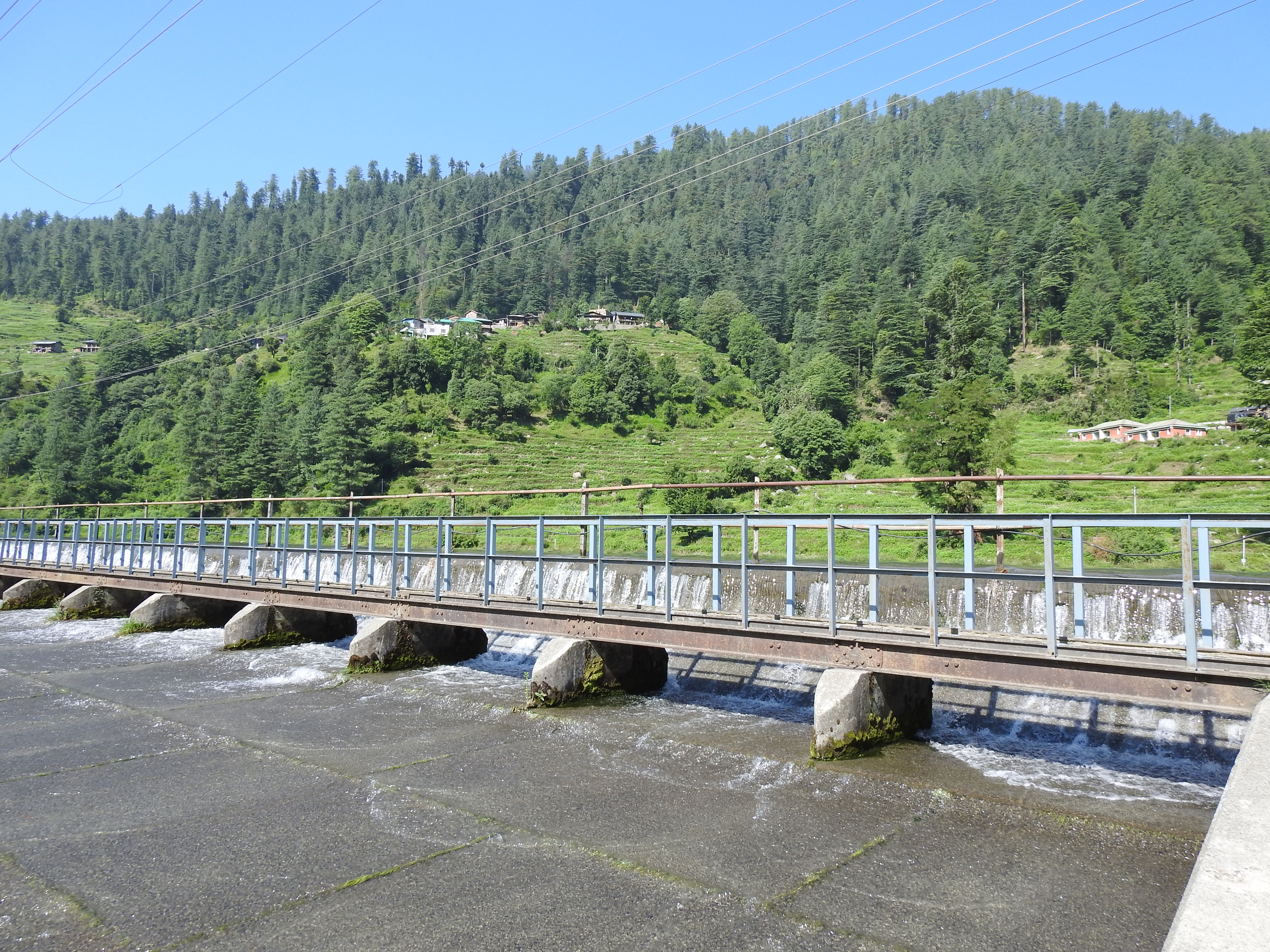
View of Barot valley

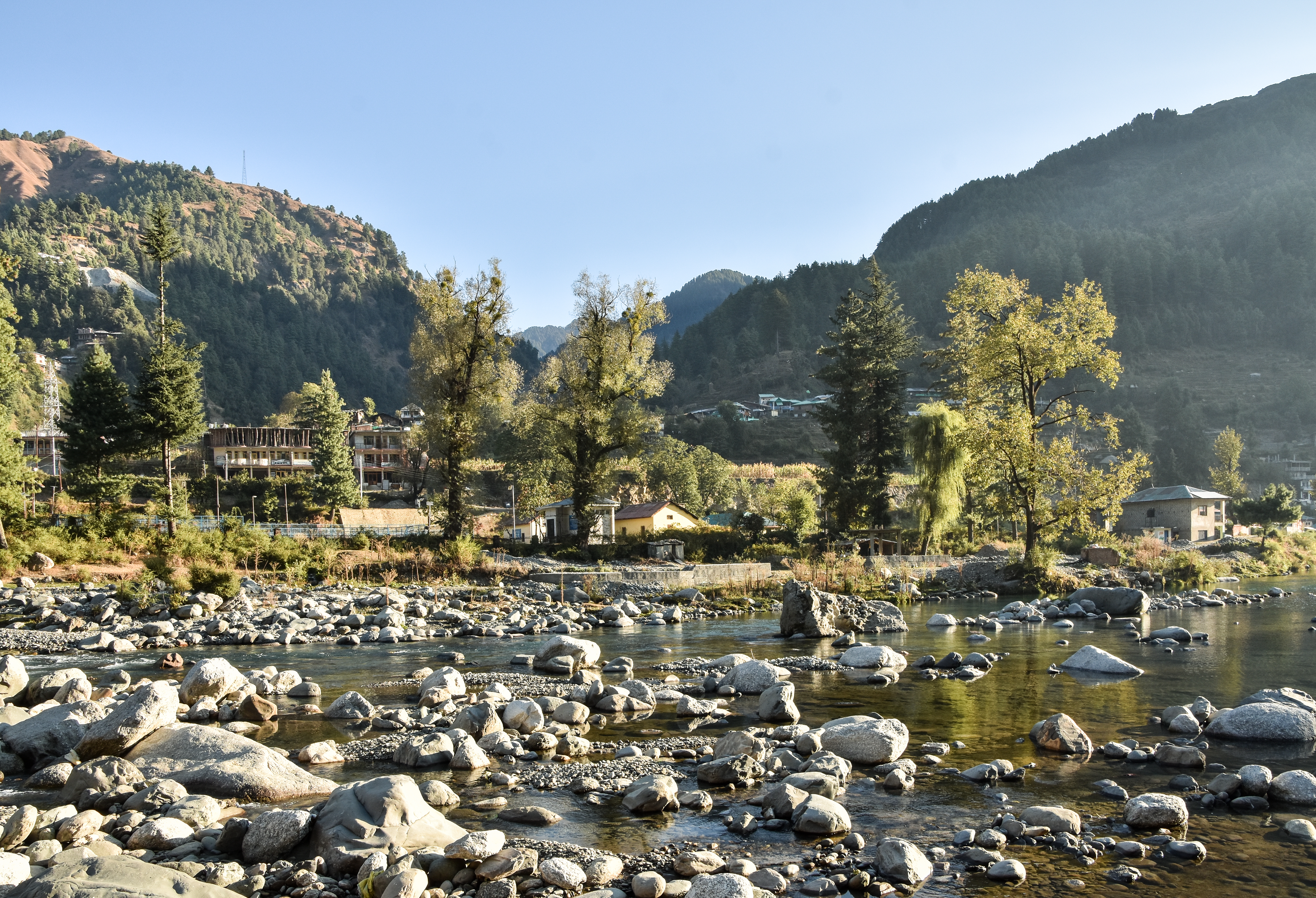
Rocky Uhl above reservoir, Oct '20

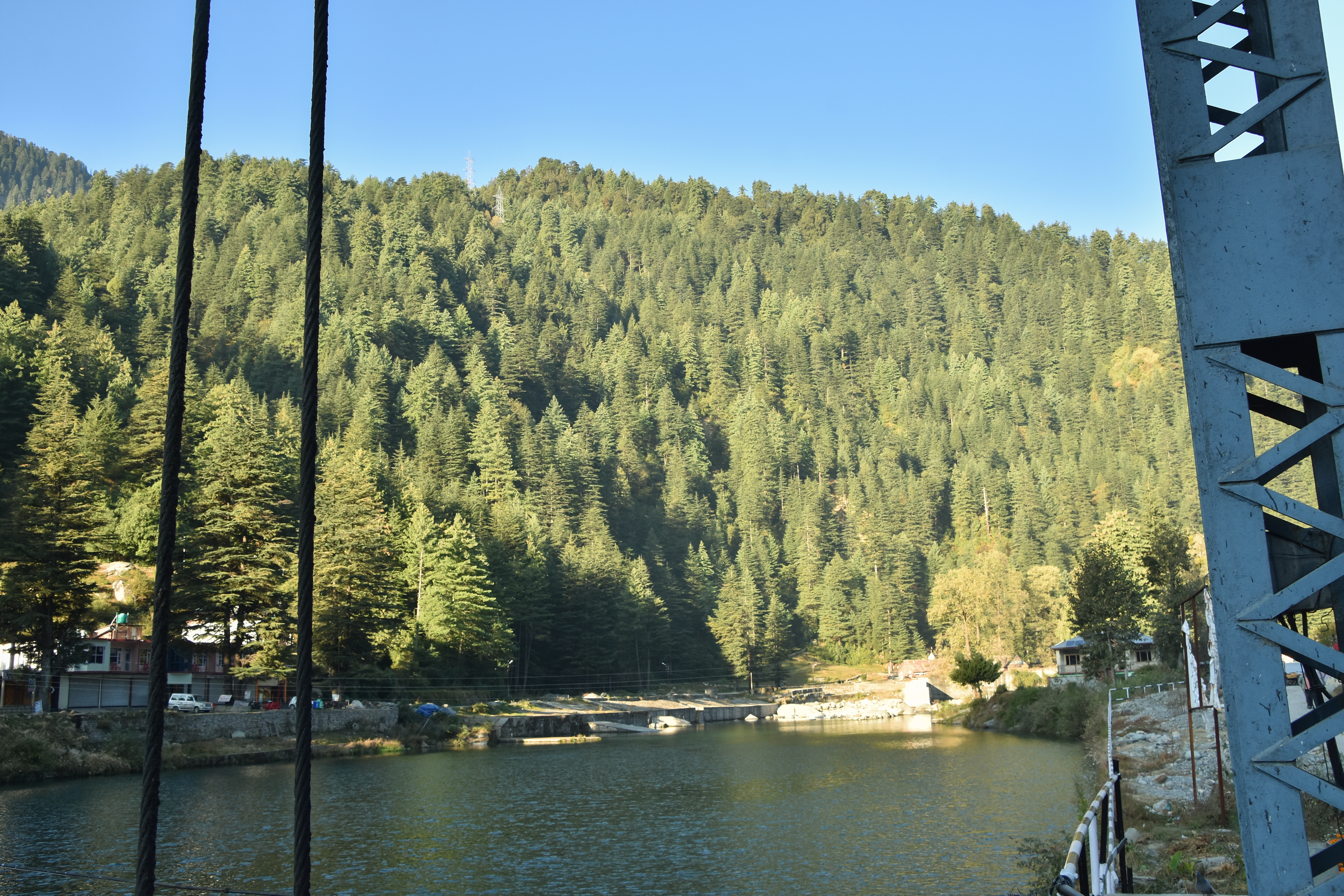
Reservoir viewed from barrage, Oct '20

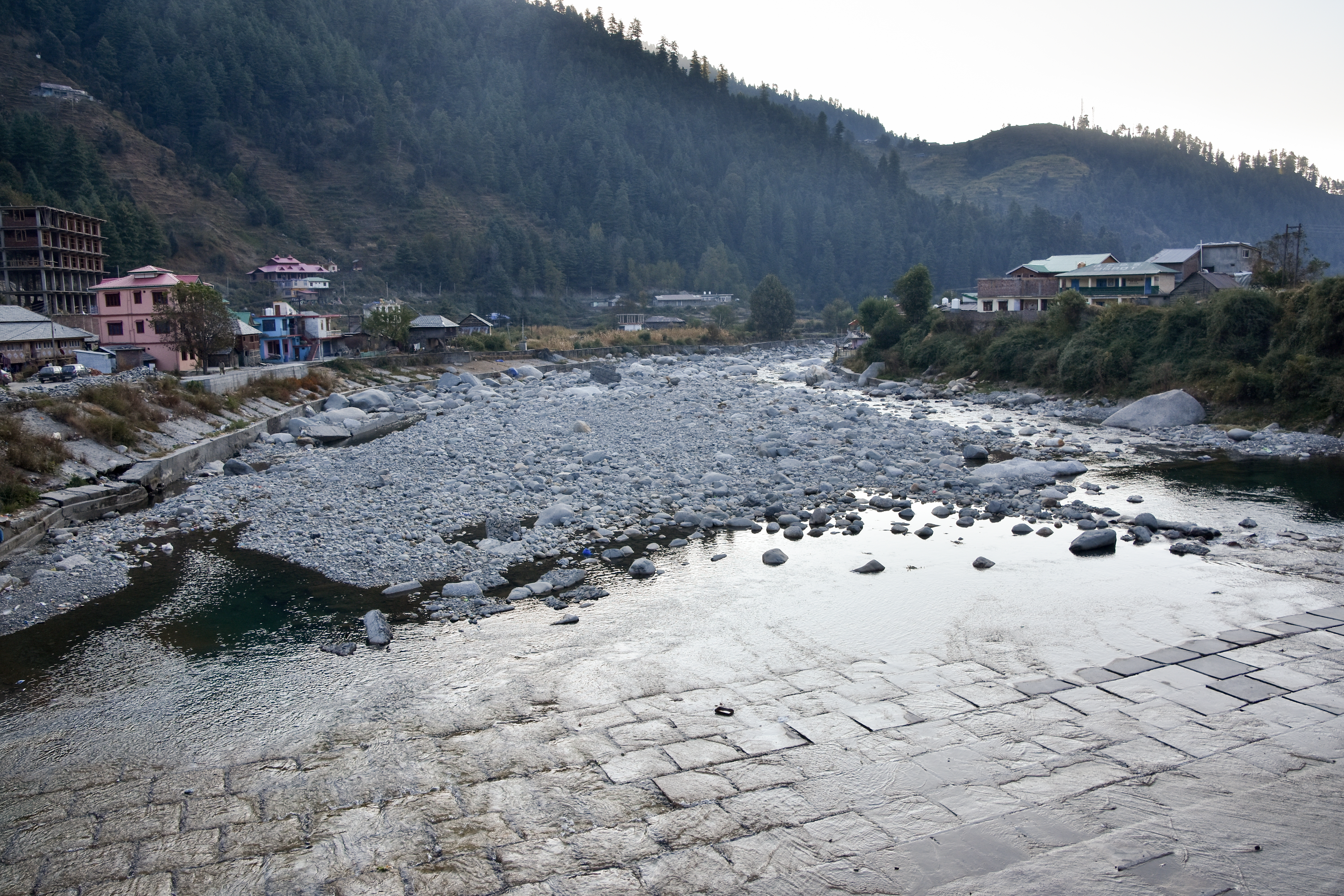
Dry riverbed downstream from barrage, Oct '20

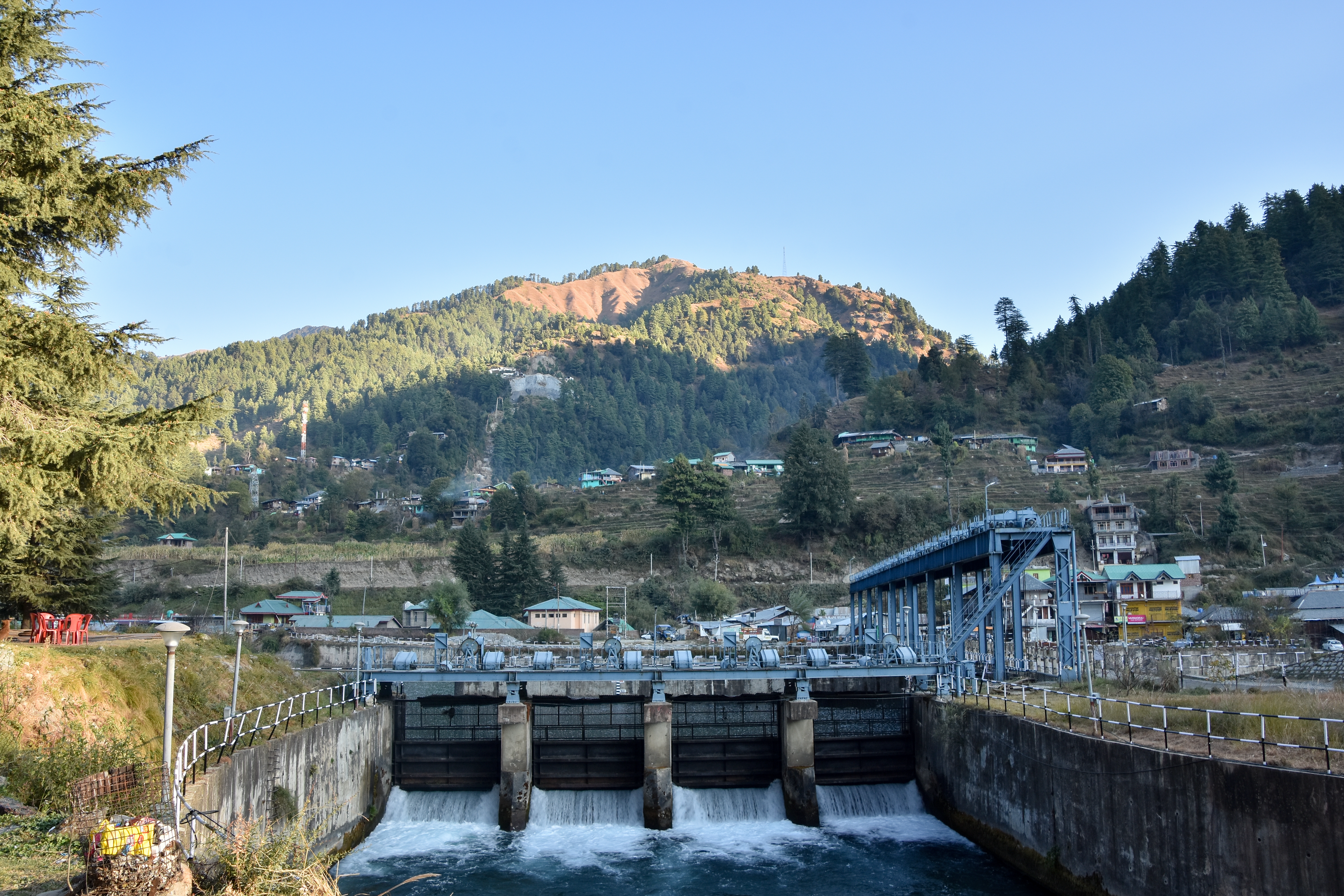
Barrage and Barot village, Oct '20

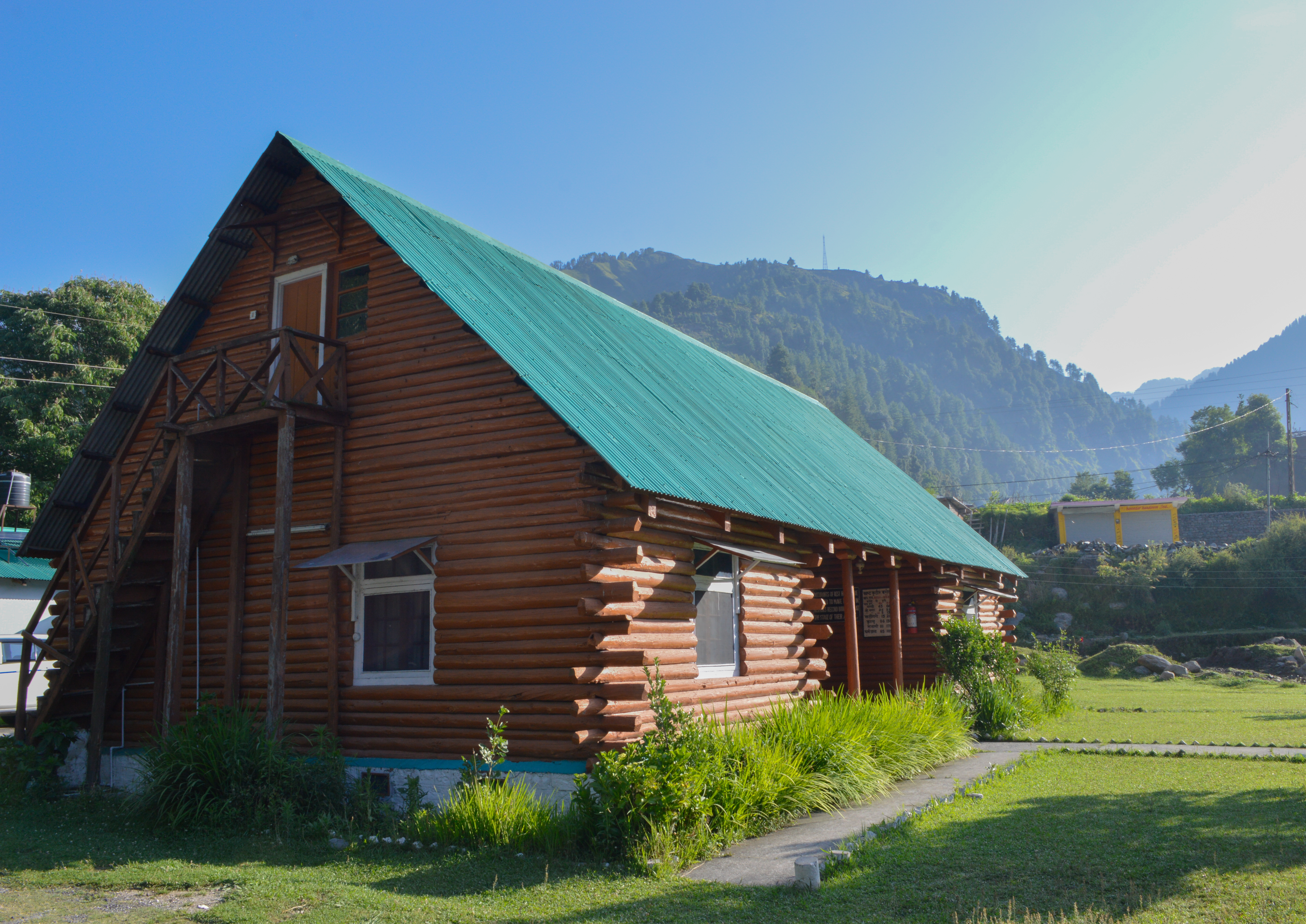
PWD Resthouse, Barot Oct '17

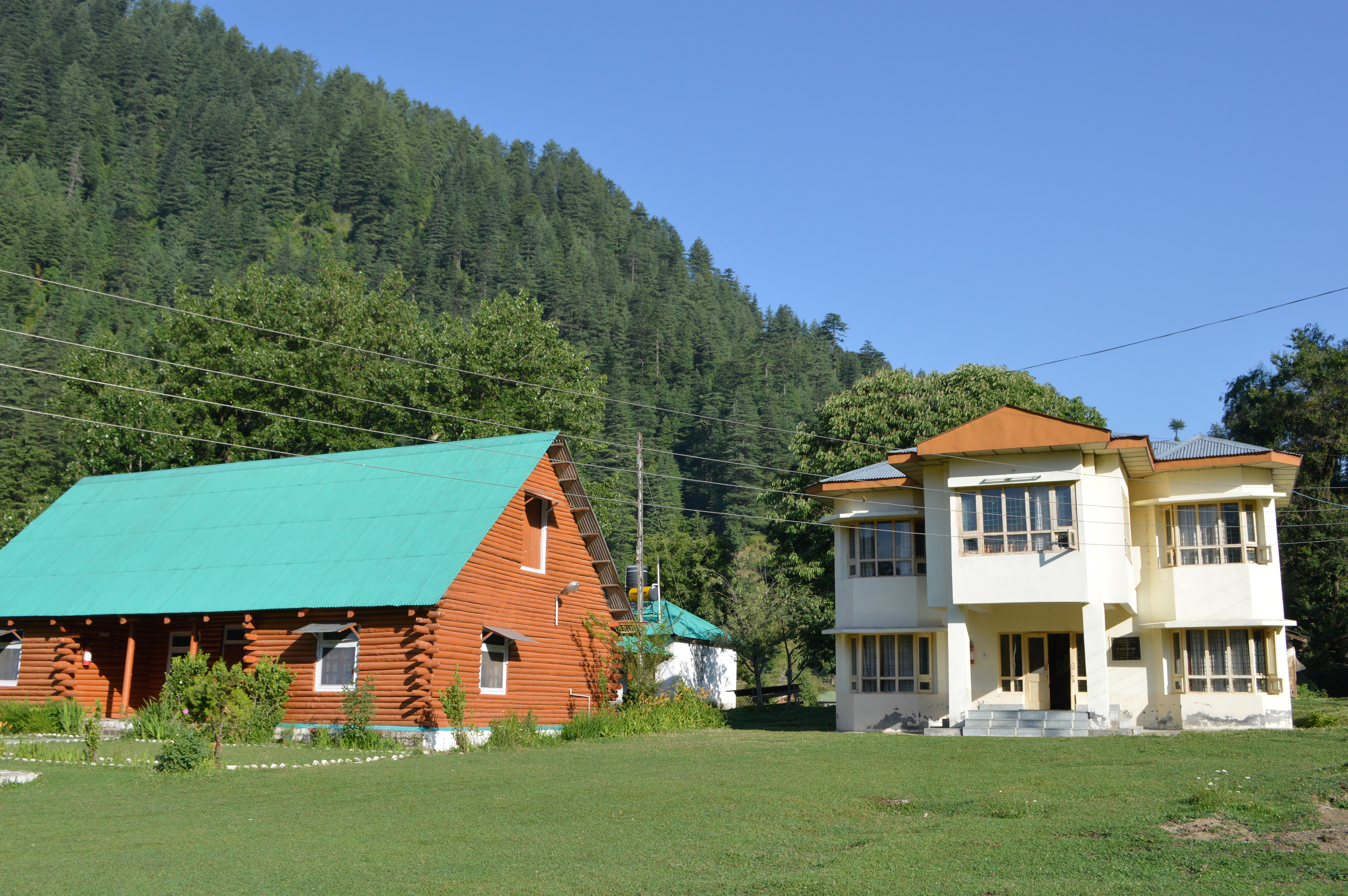
PWD Resthouse, Barot Oct '17

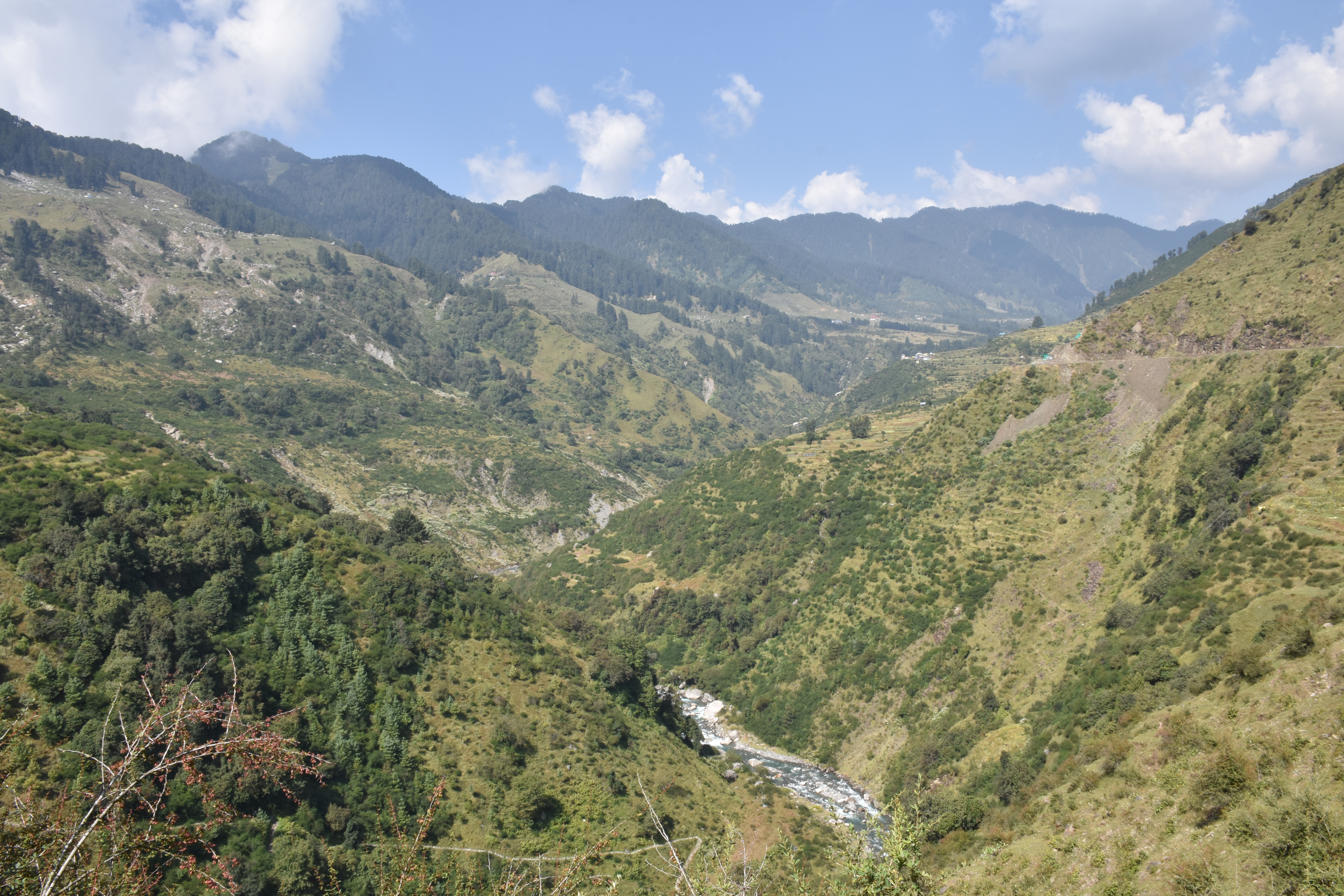
The Uhl River above Barot looking towards Billing, Oct 2017

=== People and life in Barot Valley ===
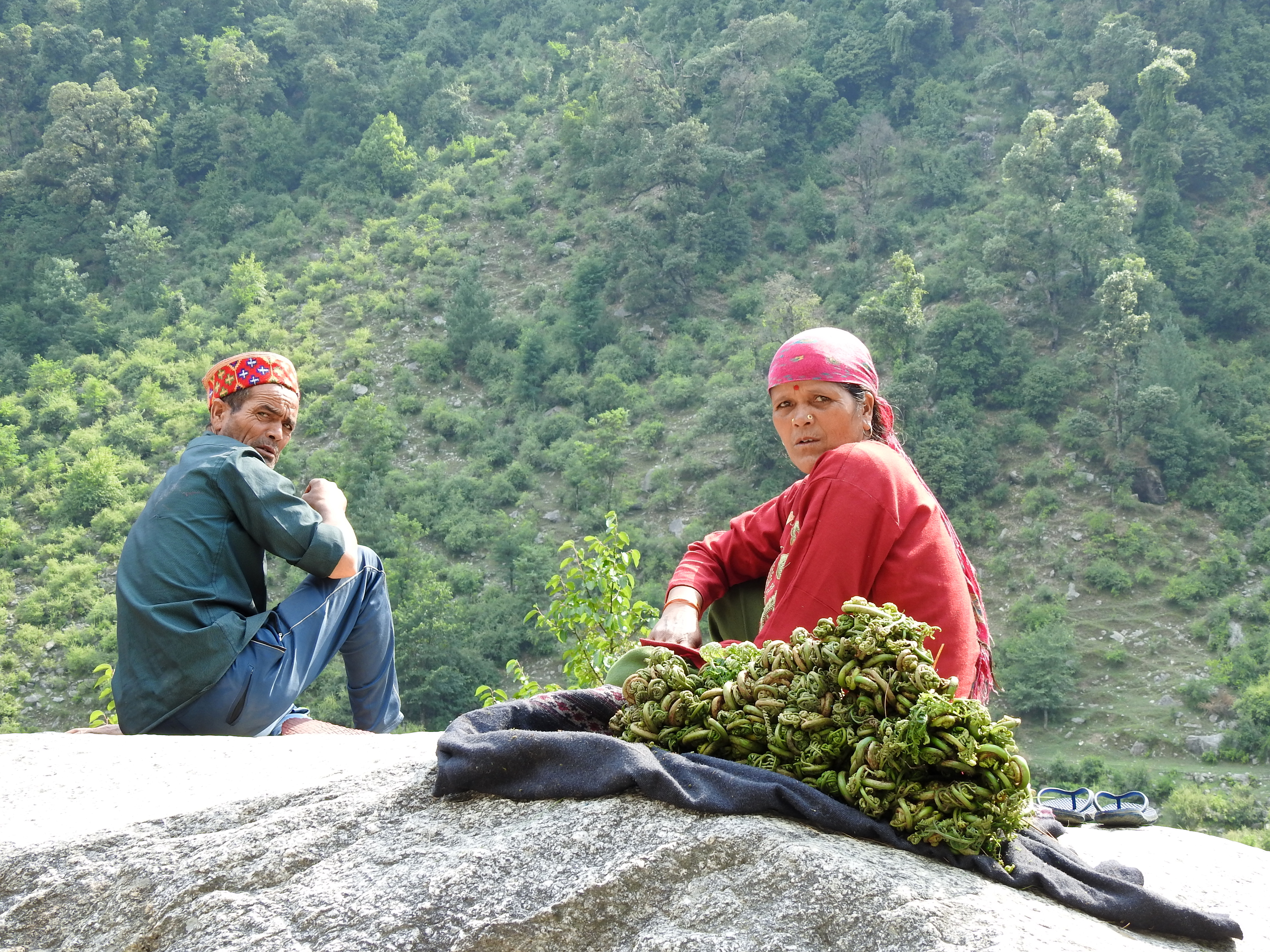
A Himachali couple selling Lingaru – a naturally grown vegetable in mountain

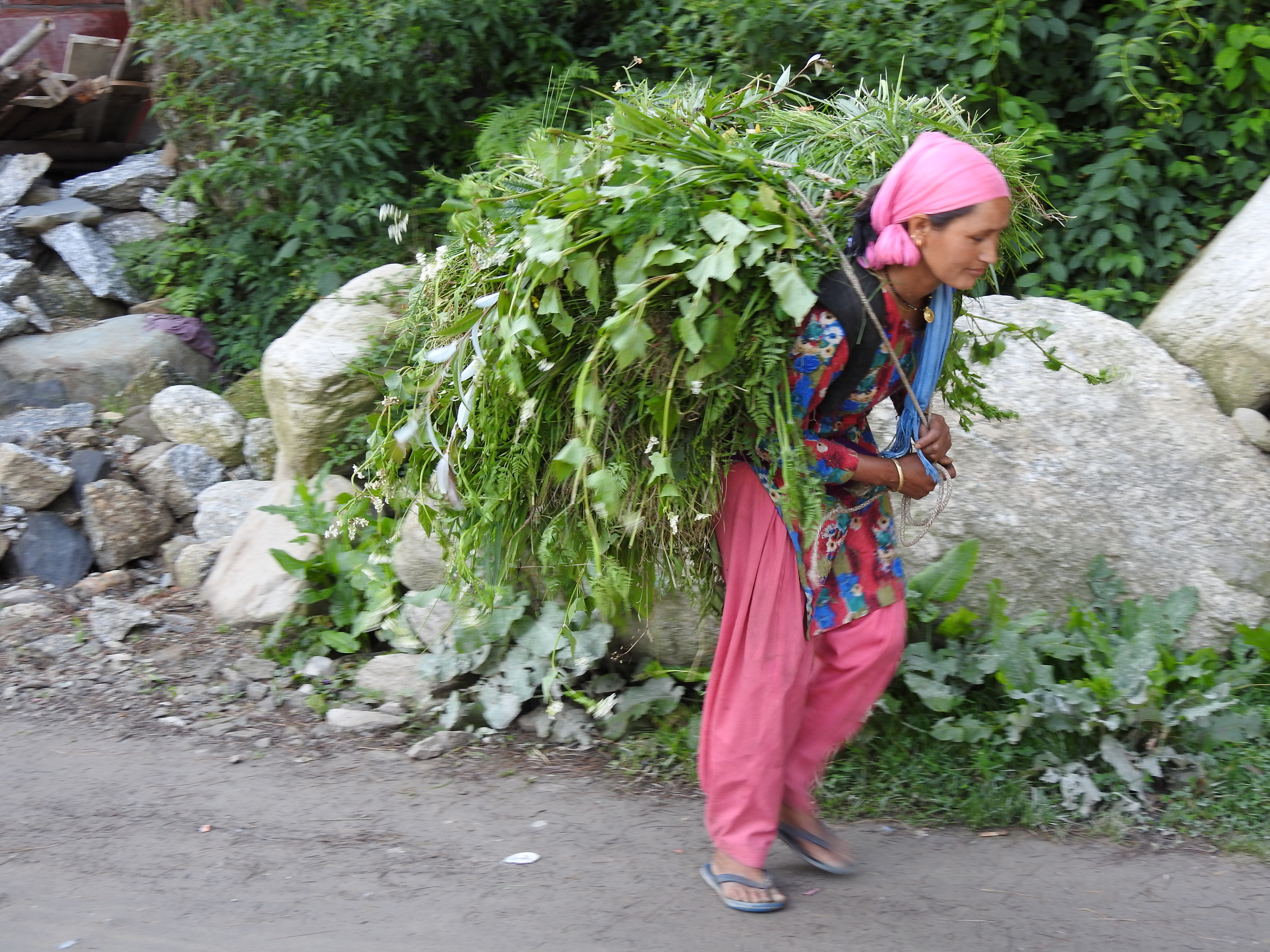
Himachali woman carrying fodder

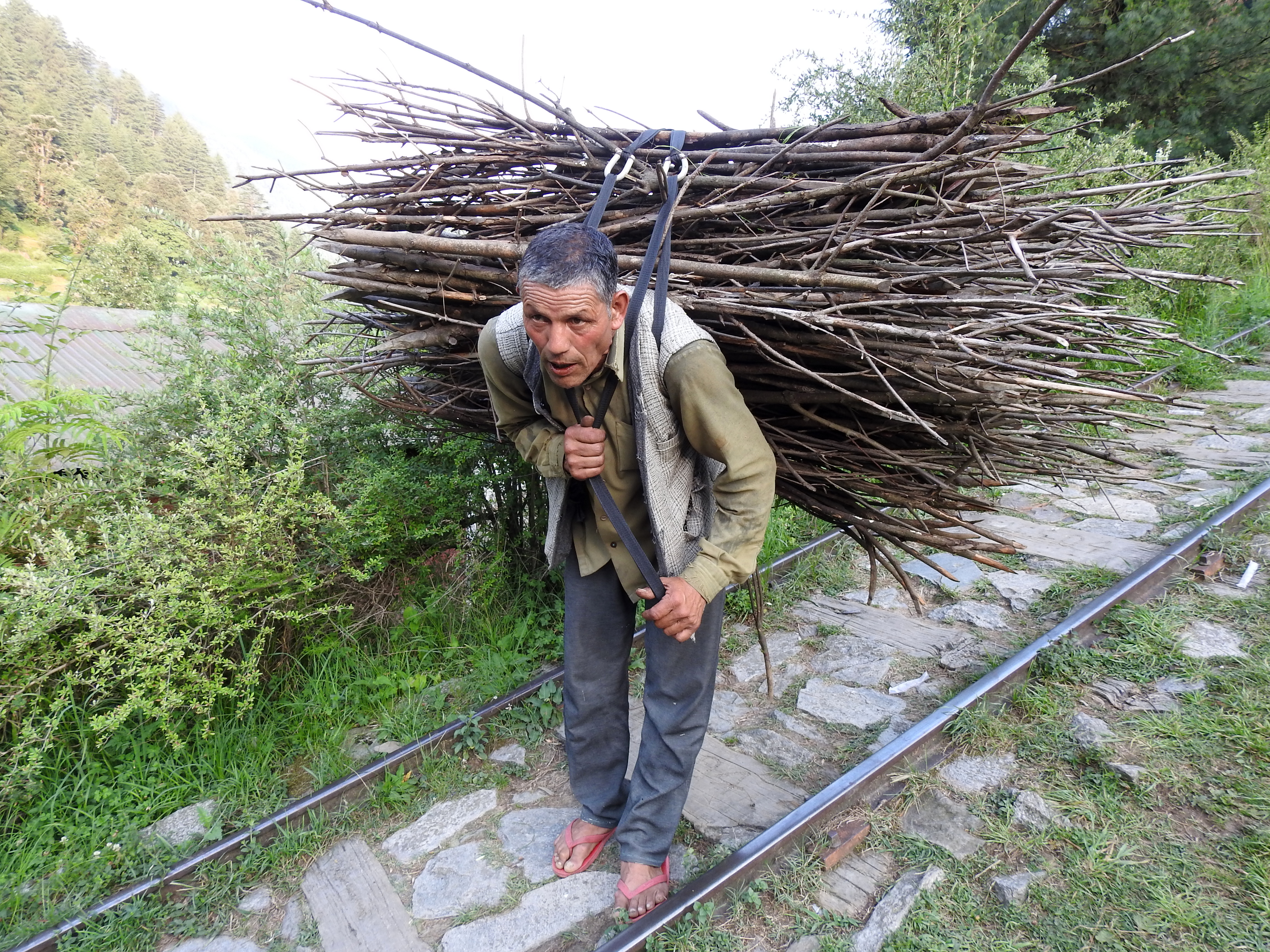
A farmer with sticks to be used for support of vegetable crops

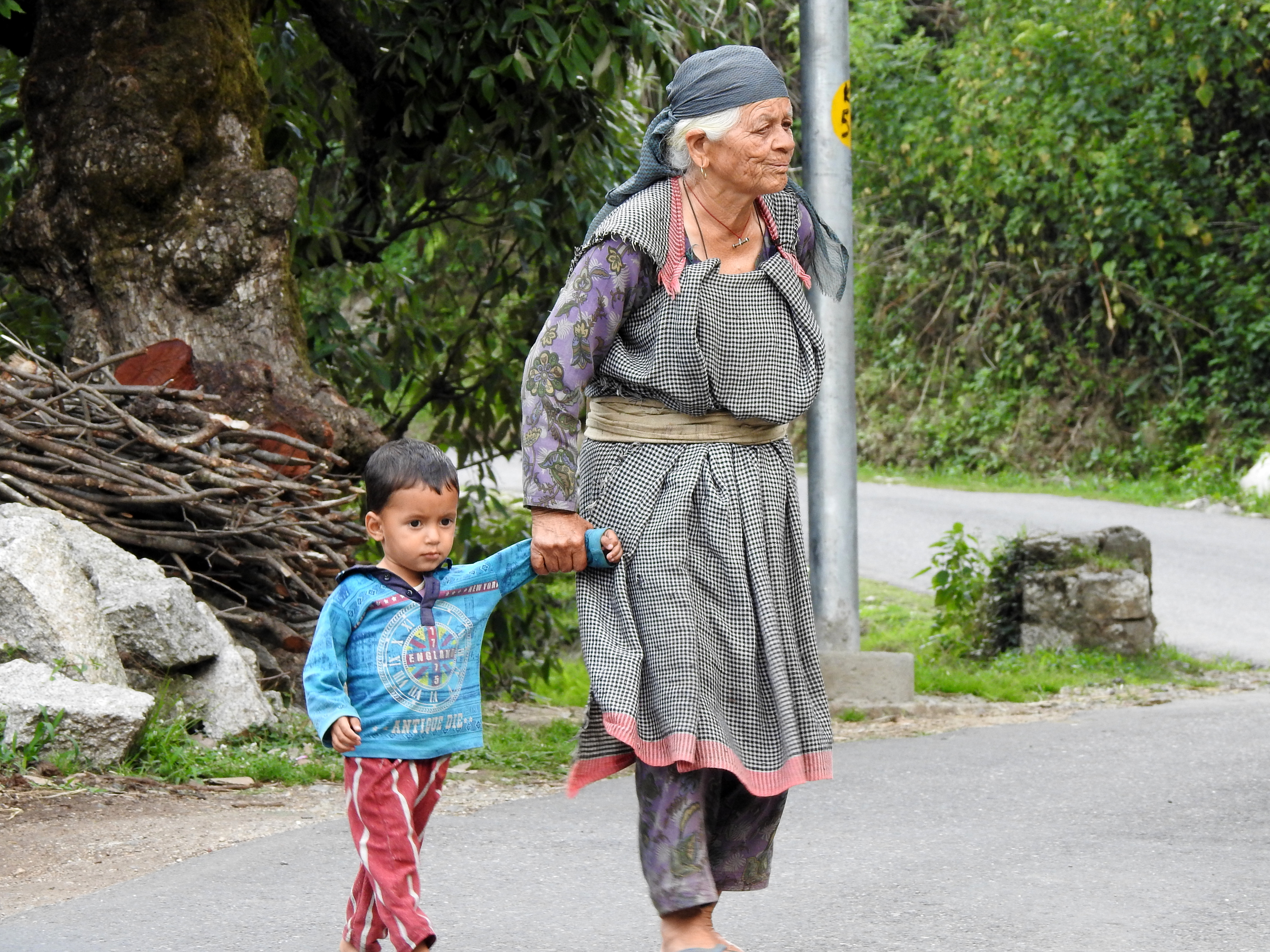
People and social life in Barot, Mandi, Himachal Pradesh

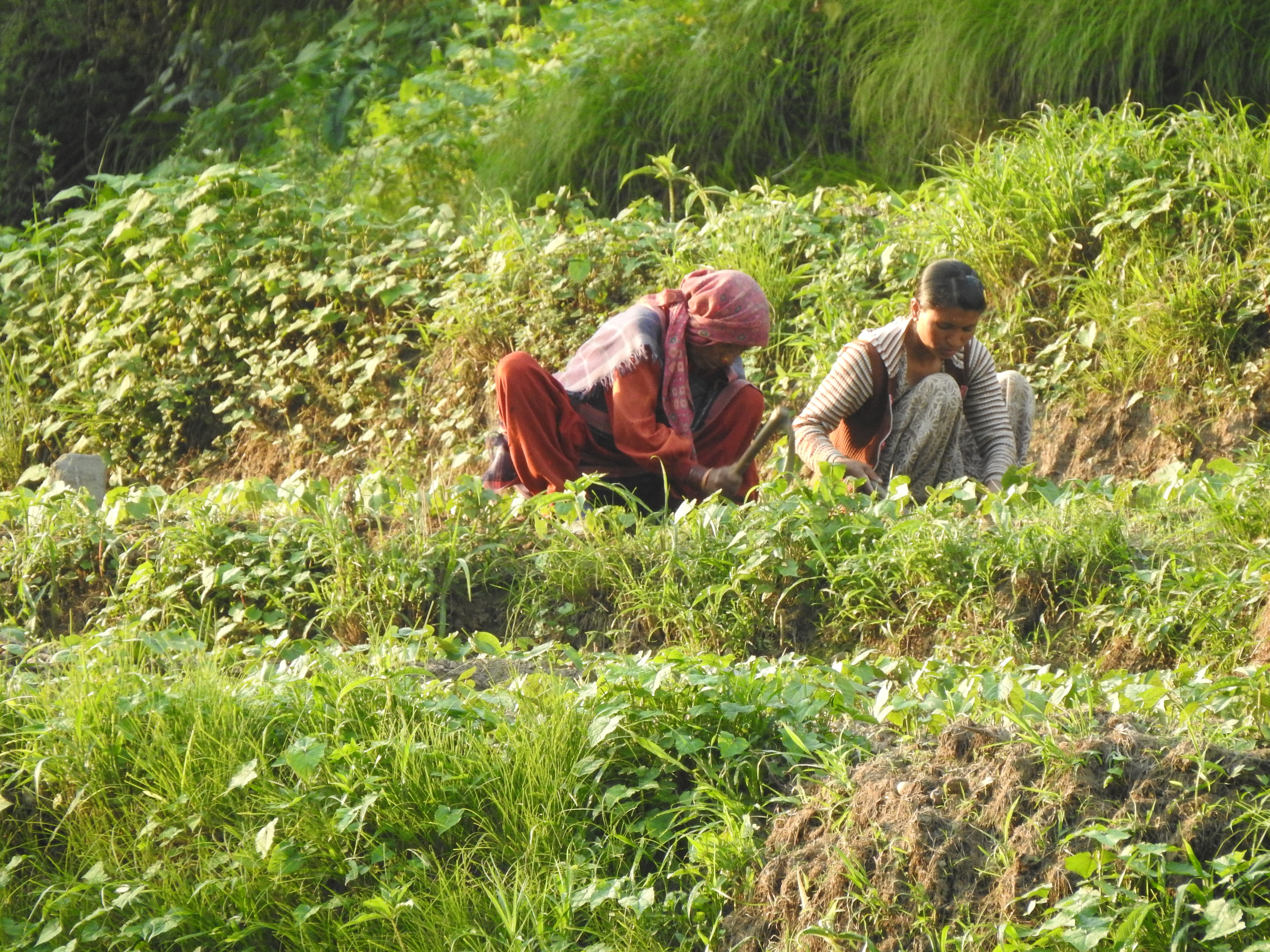
Women working in agriculture fields

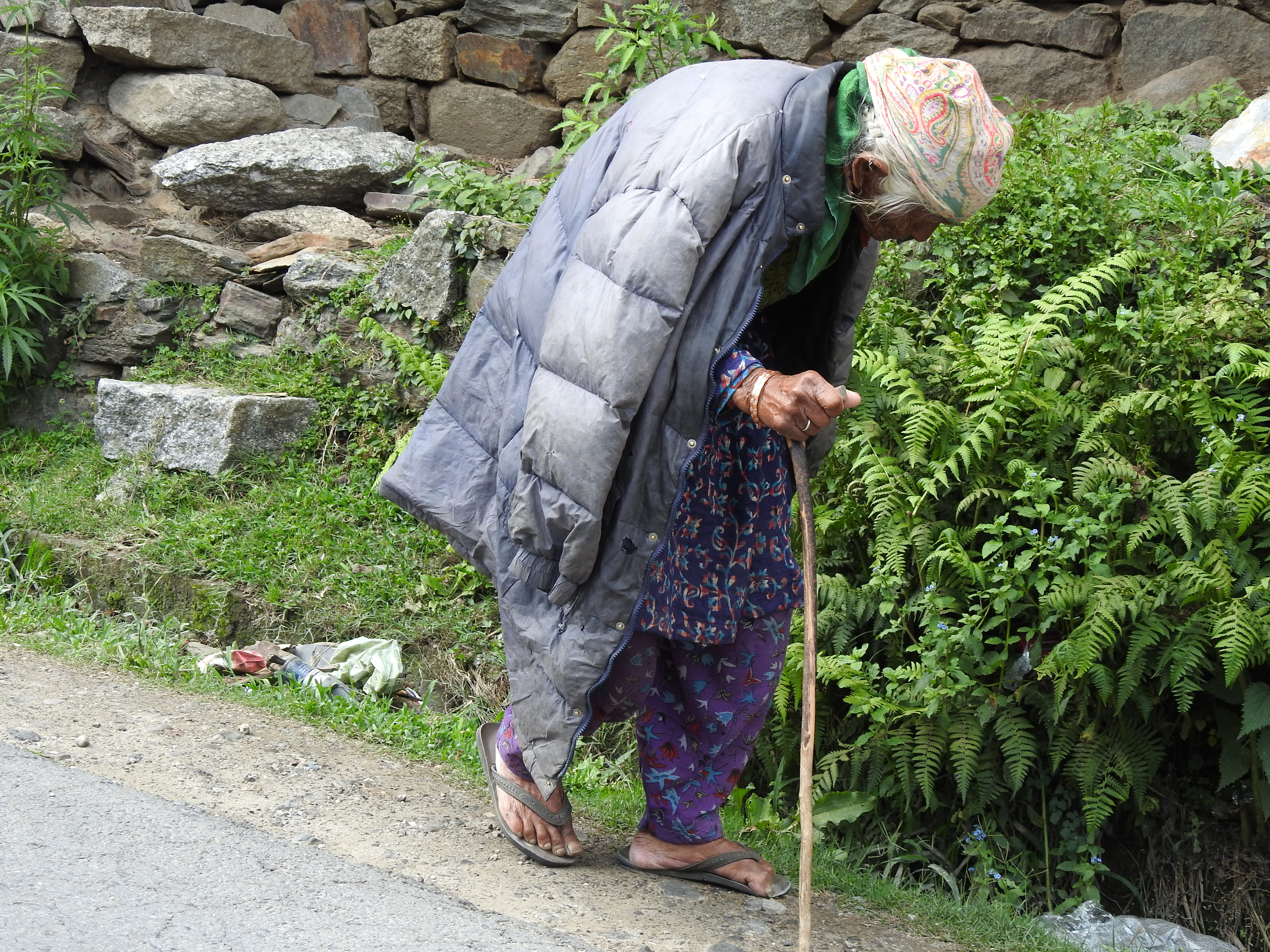
People and social life in Barot – an old Himachali woman on the way to her home near Barot

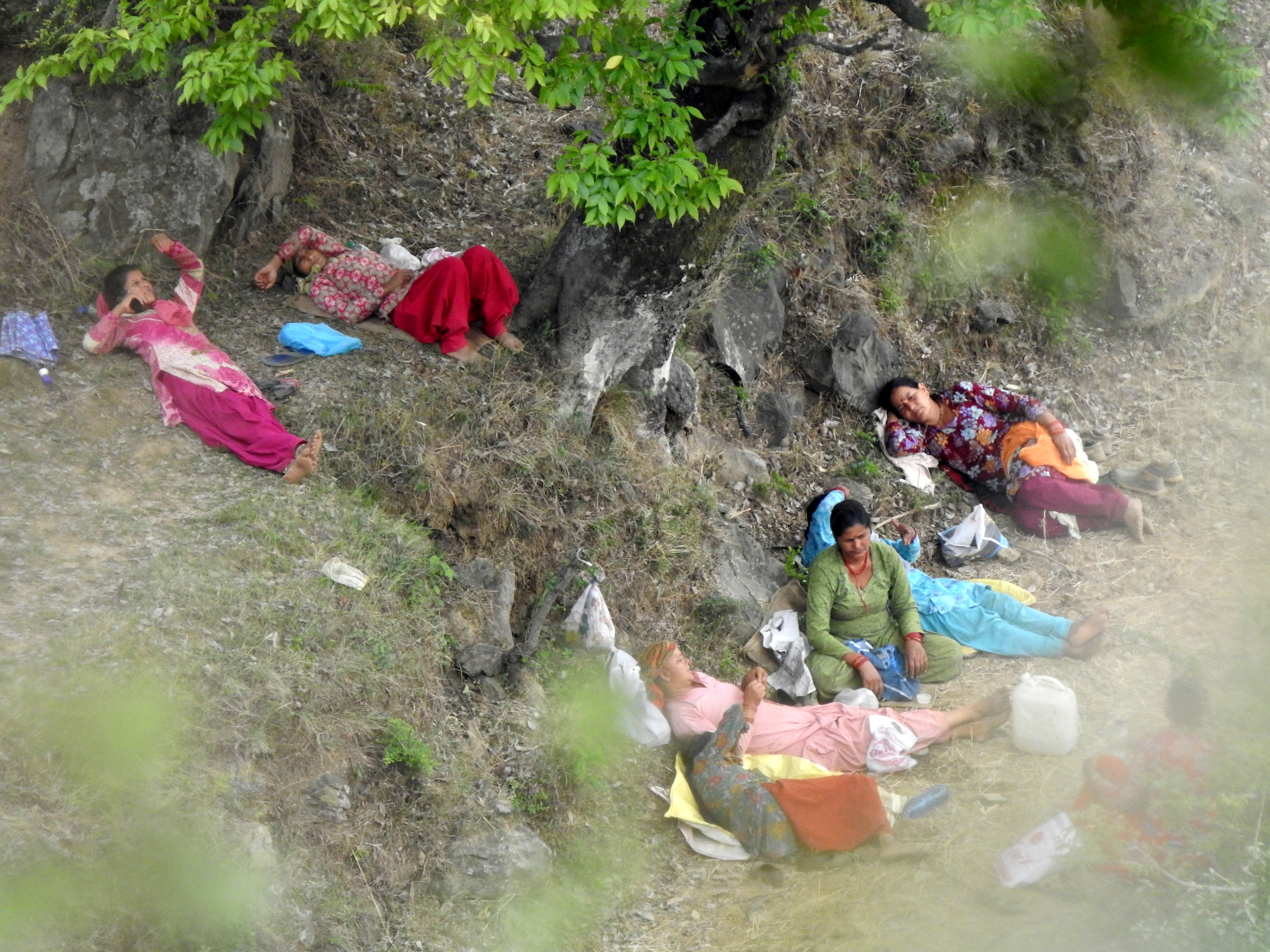
Himachali women resting after working in the fields

=== Traditional Housing structures of Barot ===
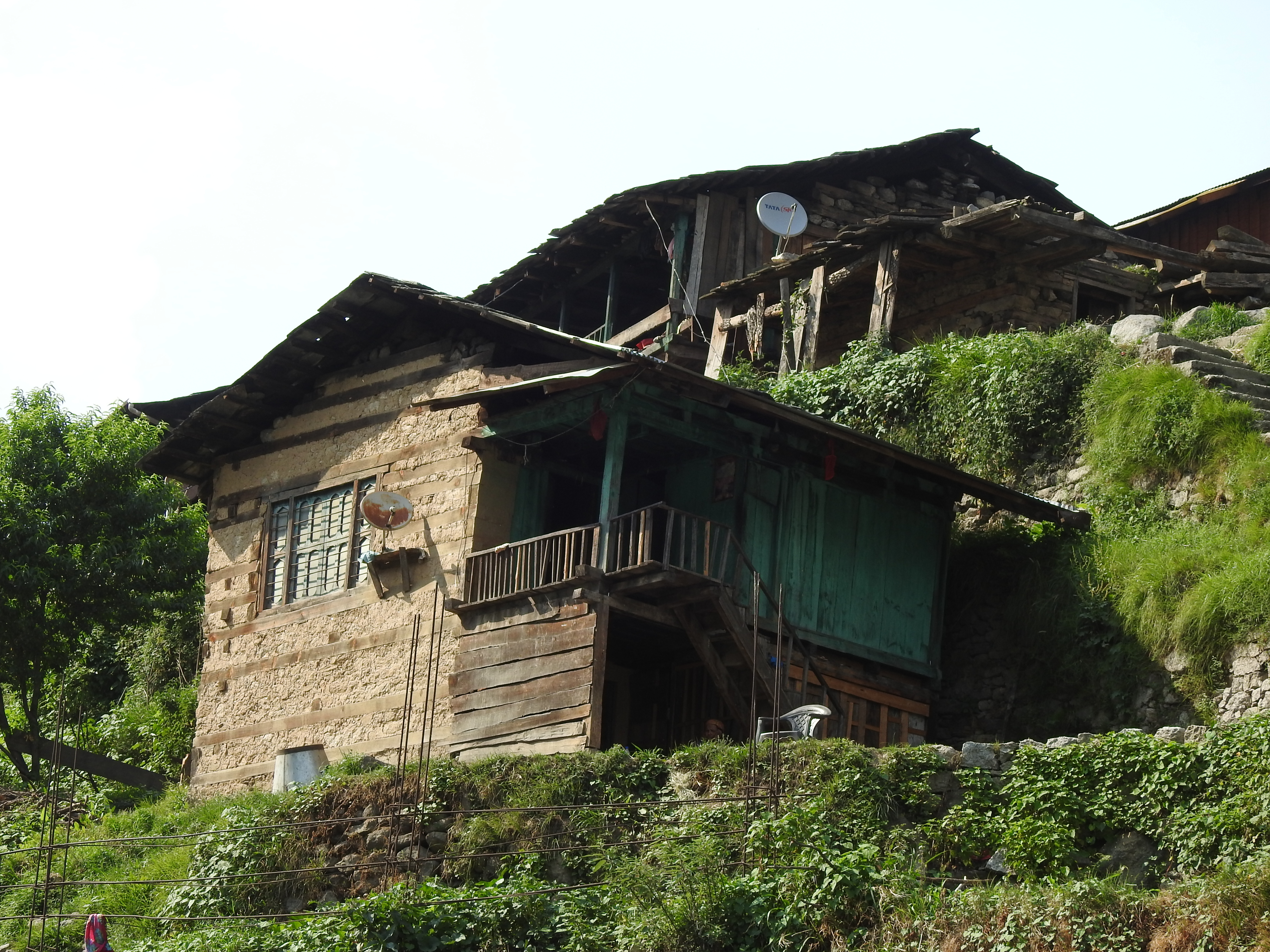

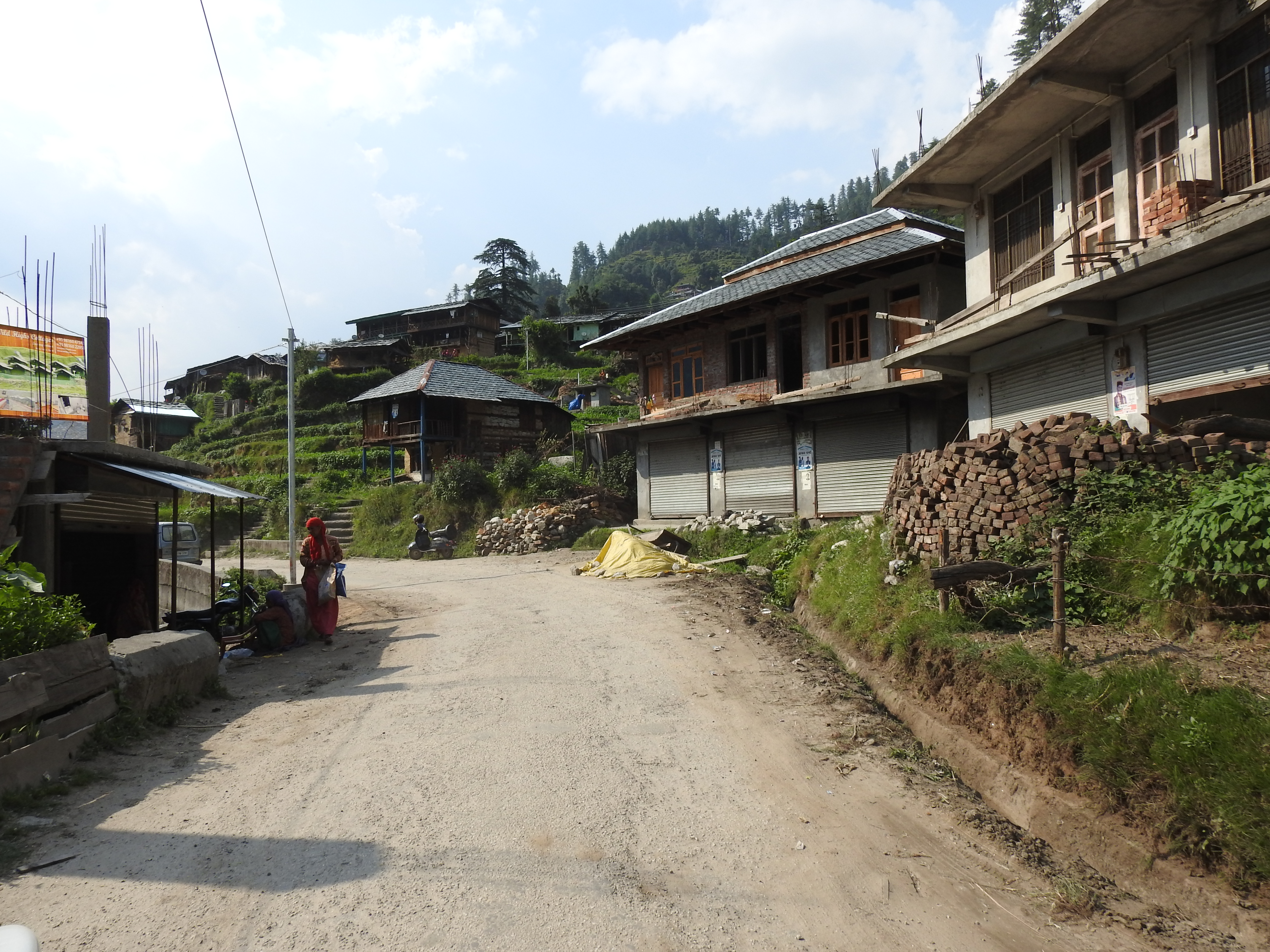

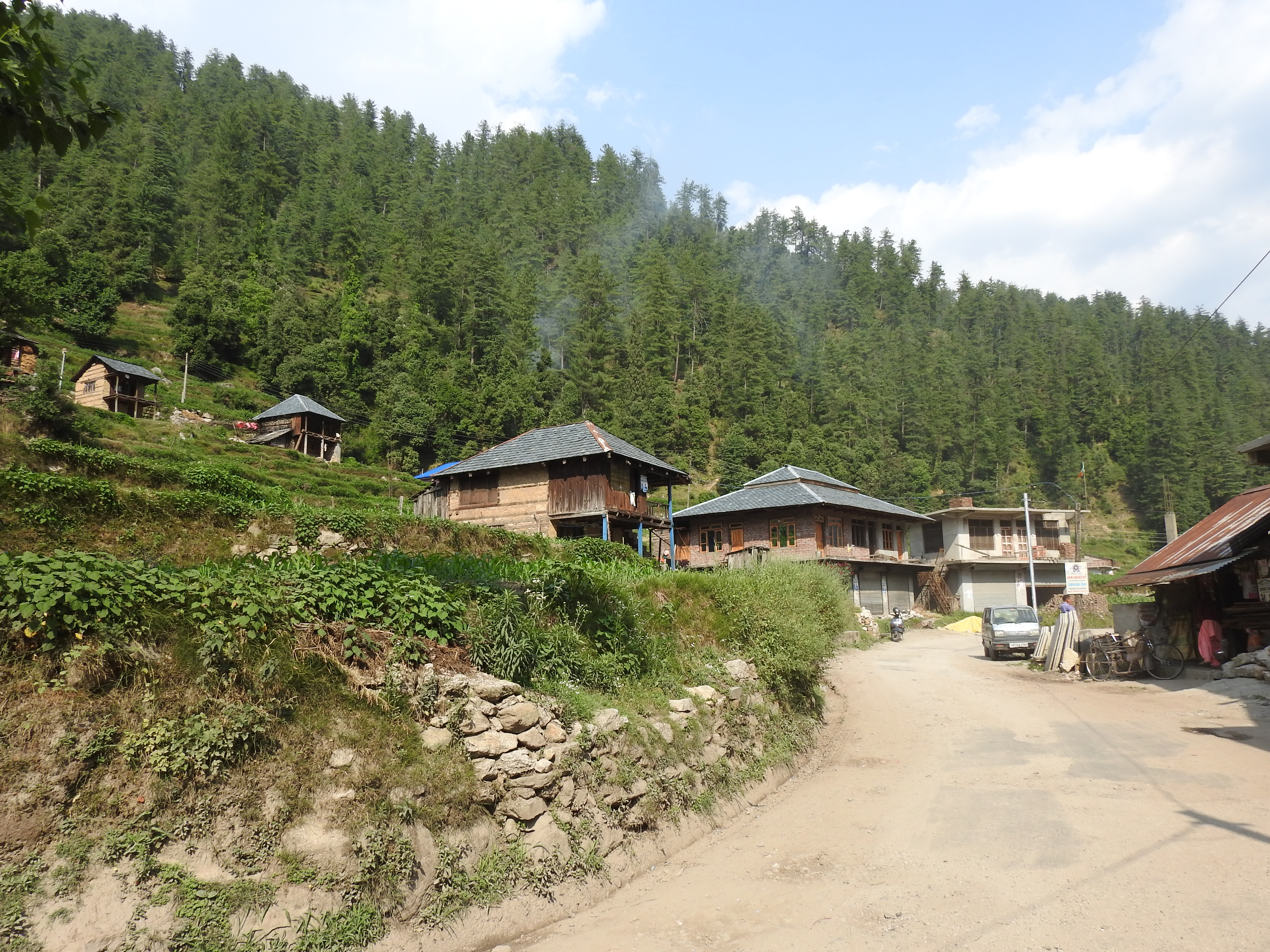

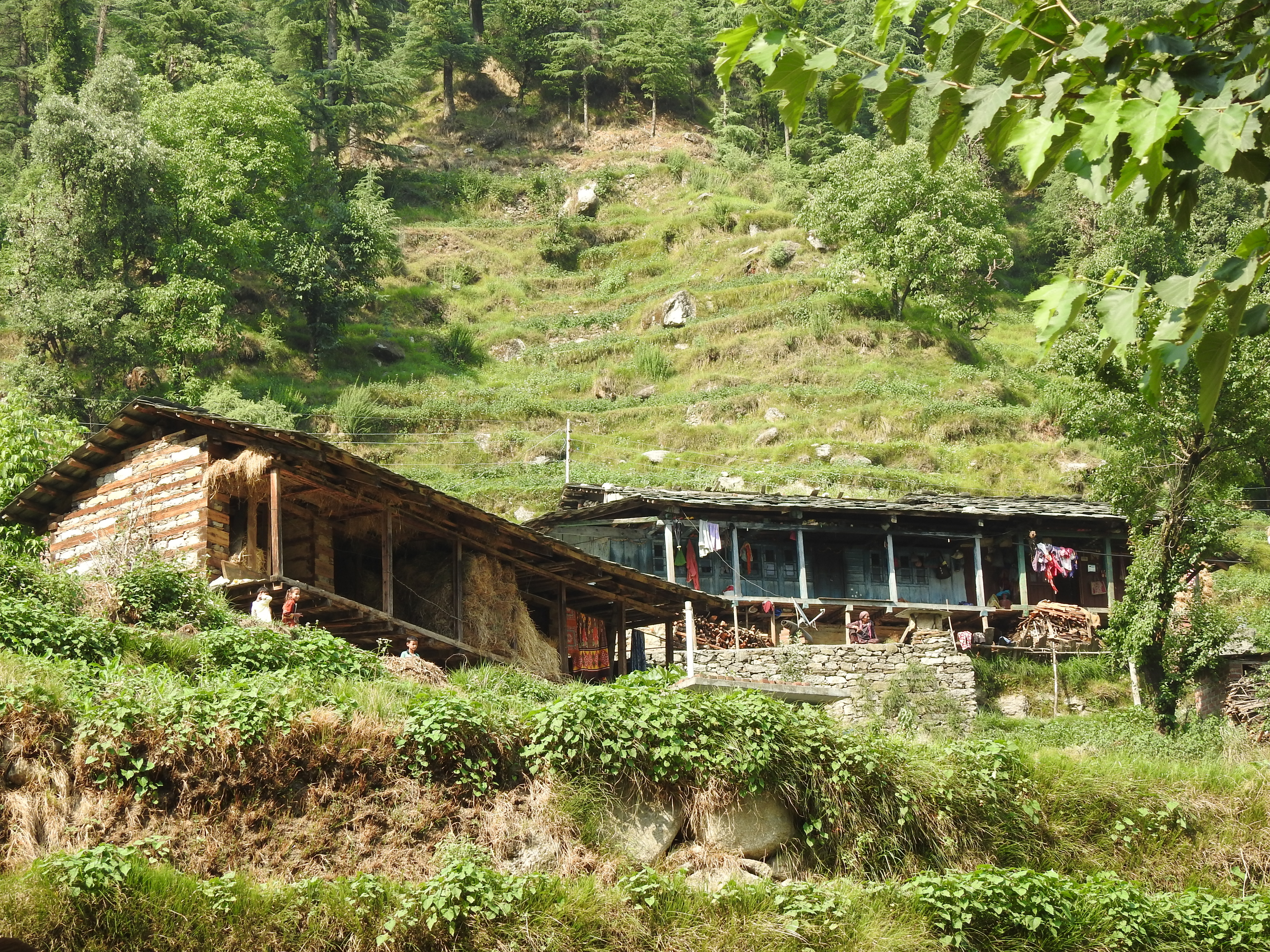

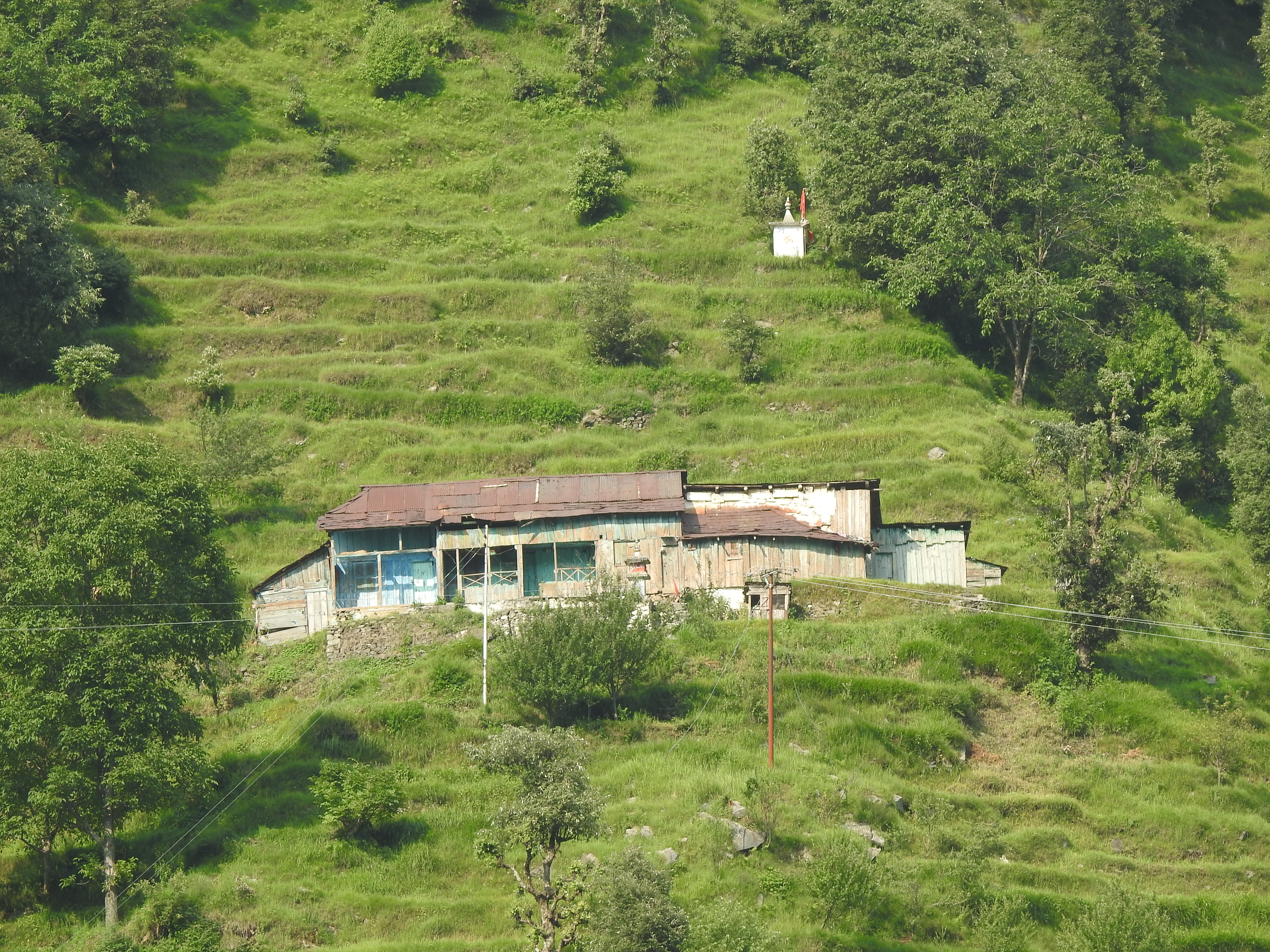
