= Shanan Power House =

Hydroelectric power station in India

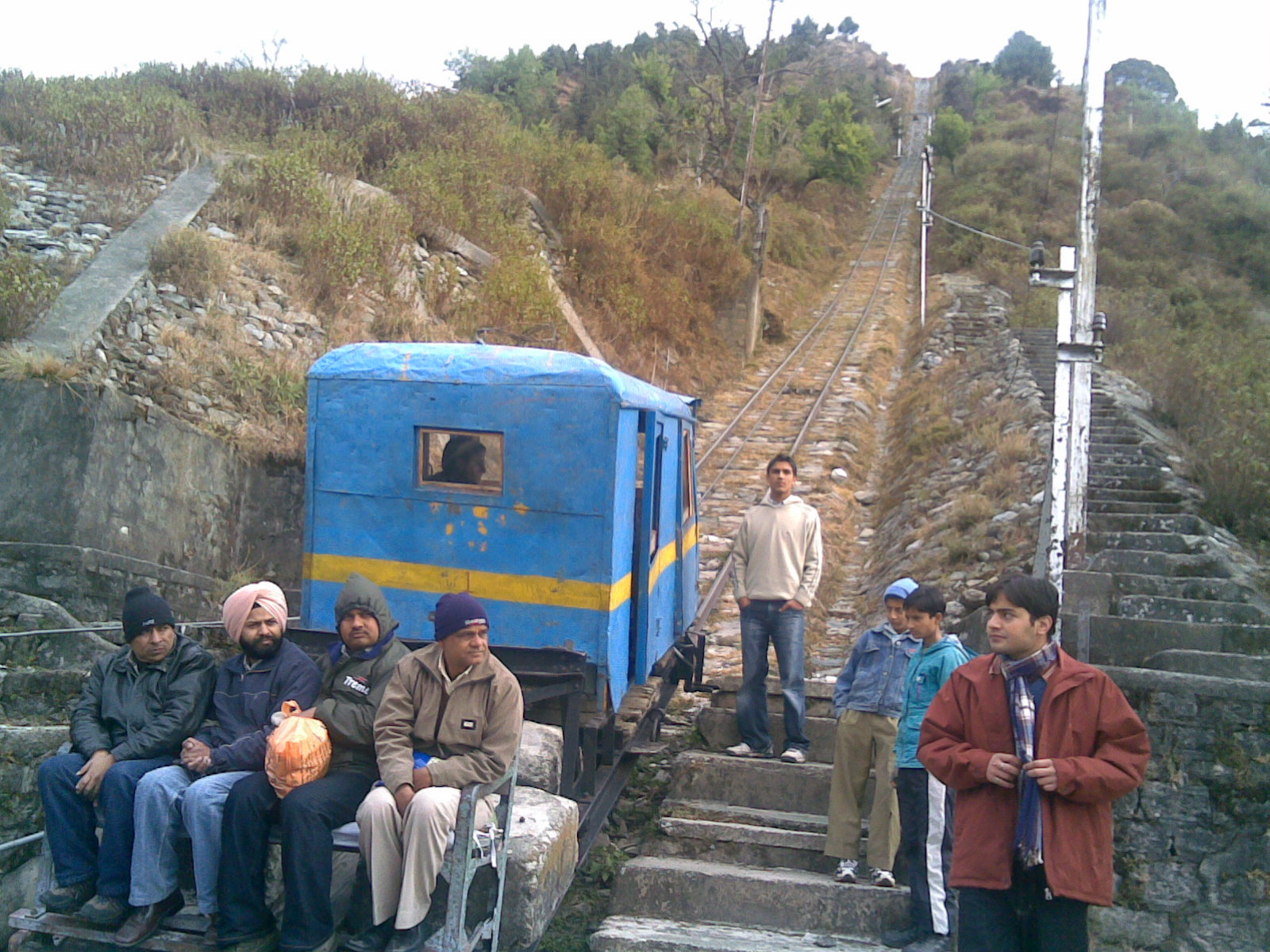
Haulage in the Joginder Nagar Valley

Shanan Power House (commissioned in 1932) is situated 2 km from Jogindernagar in Himachal Pradesh, India. It is the first hydroelectric power project of India in megawatt capacity. British Engineer Colonel B.C. Batty and his team in collaboration with the then ruler of Joginder Nagar region, Raja Karan Sen, designed and created it. The Shanan Power house is currently under the control of Punjab State Electricity Board and whole of the revenue goes to Punjab government. It is to be handed over to the Himachal Pradesh Government in 2024 after the completion of a 99-year lease.

== Design ==
The project utilizes the hydroelectric potential between Uhl river at Barot and Jogindernagar that are separated by a crow fly distance of 7.3 km (4.5 miles) across a mountain range. Barot is at an elevation of 1829 m (6001 ft) while Shanon power house is at an elevation of 1283 m (4212 ft) ft. The water conductor system consists of a diversion dam at Barot, a tunnel and penstocks. The three penstocks include the two original 1.397 m dia and the third added for increased capacity in 1982 which is 1.83 m dia. The water from the power house discharges into Neri Khad in the River Beas catchment area.

== Construction ==
British Engineer Colonel B.C. Batty wanted to construct five hydro-electric power stations by utilizing the water of Uhl river. To bring men and material for work to this place, a railway line was built from Pathankot to Joginder Nagar. To deliver construction material to the hill top for making a water reservoir at Barot, a funicular trolley way system was created there.

The plan was to use the water for five power projects, but could not be completed due to the death of Mr. Batty, and it was stopped with only three power stations, the other being Bassi Power Station. A recently activated plant is Chullah powerstation having a reservoir at Machiyal.

The original turbines were 4 x 12 MW. In March 1982, the Punjab Government upgraded the original turbines to 4 x 15 MW and added a 50 MW turbine for a total capacity of 110 MW. Turbines are from Ganz mavag, Hungary.

== See also ==
- Barot
- Uhl River
