= Thamsar Pass =

- Thamsar Jot
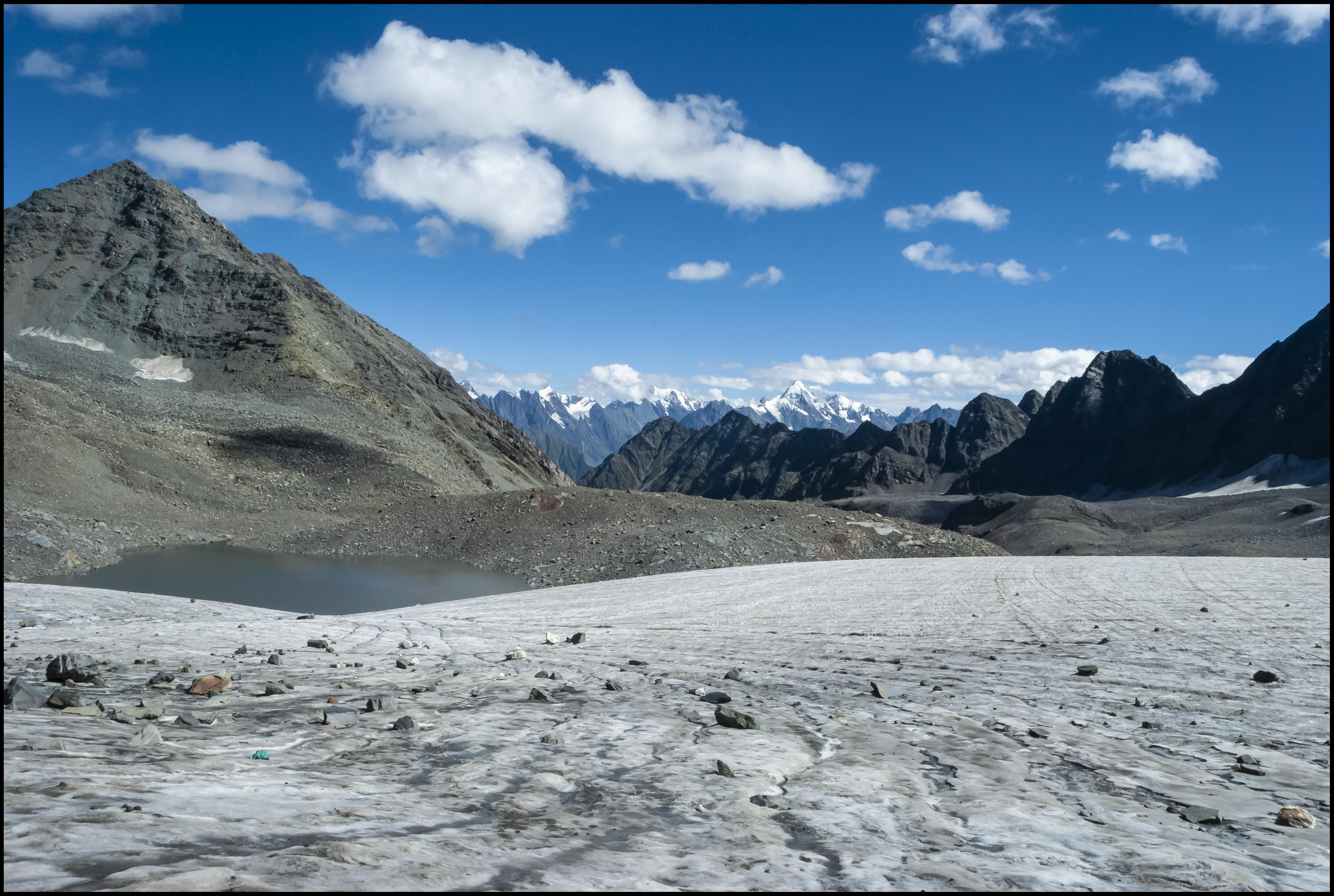
- Thamsar Pass and lake

- Location within Himachal Pradesh Location within India
- Elevation: 4,750 m (15,580 ft)

Location
- Location: Barot Valley, Himachal, India
- Range: Himalayas
- Coordinates: 32°13′32″N 76°46′43″E

Thamsar Pass is a high mountain pass located in the Dhauladhar Range of the western Himalayas in Himachal Pradesh, India. It connects remote regions within Kangra and Chamba districts—primarily linking Bara Bhangal and the Barot Valley as well as Bir–Billing area. It serves both as a traditional shepherd route and a moderate difficult trek.

== Geography and Location ==
Thamsar Pass lies at an elevation of approximately 4,750 metres (15,600 ft)' above sea level. It forms part of the northern stretches of Kangra district and the southern boundary of Chamba in the Dhauladhar range.

== Connectivity and Significance ==
The pass has historically been used by the semi-nomadic Gaddi shepherds as a seasonal route to move livestock between summer grazing grounds in Bara Bhangal and markets near Bir-Billing, Barot Valley, Baijnath, and Joginder Nagar. It is typically accessible from mid-June to mid-October each year.

== Trekking and Adventure tourism ==
Thamsar Pass is a recognized moderate to difficult trek of around 20 kilometers from Rajgundha to Thamsar Pass and further 15 kilometers towards Bara Bhangal. Route includes starting from Billing or Bir, moving through mountain villages such as Rajgundha(2550m), and temporary settlements Palachak(2700), Johdi Waterfall (3070m), Panhartu (3600m), Bhedpal (4100m) and crossing Thamsar Pass (4750m) before descending into Bara Bhangal (2500m) via Marhi (4000m). Trek duration varies from 2–5 days, offering views of two glacial lakes, Chhoti Thamsar (Barot valley side) and Badi Thamsar (Bara Bhanghal side) lakes along with five other large and small glacial lakes in the vicinity, alpine meadows, and Himalayan peaks of around 5000 meters.

== Flora and Fauna ==
The region features diverse vegetation zones—from lower-elevation deodar, oak, and rhododendron forests to high-altitude alpine meadows and herbaceous plants. Wildlife includes species such as Himalayan Tahr and musk deer, with occasional sightings of Himalayan Black bears, and Brown bears, and high-altitude birds. In a first, snow leopard has been reported as the photographic evidence of the elusive and endangered snow leopard (Panthera uncia), has been recorded in the Dhauladhar Wildlife Sanctuary through a camera trap.

== Climate and Accessibility ==
The alpine climate at Thamsar Pass is characterized by sub-zero temperatures, sudden weather changes, and heavy snowfall. Temperatures range around 10 to -30 degrees in the Pass and surrounding areas in Winter Season (October–May) when heavy snowfall and sub-zero temperatures block the accessibility, and around -5 degrees to 15 degrees during Summers (June–September) and monsoon season. Snowfall can happen throughout the year above 4000 meters with rare instances in July and August. The best season to explore the pass and surrounding areas is between June and October when snow recedes.

== Local communities and Culture ==
The trek provides insight into the traditional lifestyle of the Gaddi shepherds, who migrate seasonally through these highlands with flocks of sheep and goats. Bara Bhangal is one of the most remote villages in India, accessible via high-altitude passes like Thamsar and Kalihani, or alternatively via around 20 kilometers trek from the Holi, Chamba side.

== Conservation and Safety ==
The region is regarded as an ecologically sensitive area with fragile alpine ecosystems. Trekkers and explorer are often prone to landslides, altitude sickness, avalanches, variable weather due to its difficult high altitude terrain and unpredictable weather.

=== Dhauladhar Wildlife Sanctuary ===
Dhauladhar Wildlife Sanctuary is a protected area passing through Thamsar Pass trail originating near Palachak campsite, around 5 kilometers north from the Rajgundha Village. It Covers an area of approximately 982.86 square kilometers. The sanctuary is known for its diverse alpine and sub-alpine ecosystems, ranging from dense deodar, oak, and rhododendron forests to high-altitude meadows. It is home to several rare and endangered species, including the Himalayan black bear, leopard, musk deer, and Himalayan tahr, along with a rich variety of birds and medicinal flora. The sanctuary plays a crucial role in biodiversity conservation objectives of the government of Himachal Pradesh. It attracts nature lovers and trekkers exploring the nearby regions of Barot Valley, Joginder Nagar Valley, Baijnath, Palampur etc. when the region is accessible.

== See also ==
- Barot, Himachal Pradesh
- Gaddi people
- Bir, Himachal Pradesh
- Jogindernagar
- Baijnath, Himachal Pradesh
