= List of lakes of India =

This is a list of notable lakes in India across all states and union territories of India.

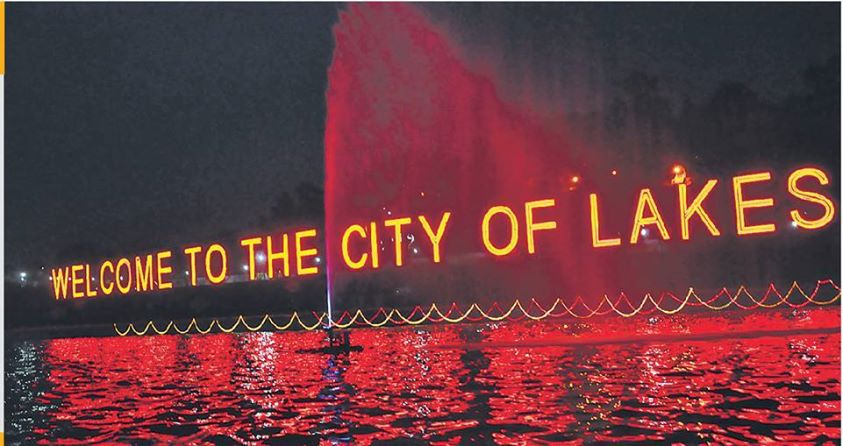
Bhopal is knowns as The City of Lakes, as it has 17 lakes and 5 reservoirs, biggest lake Bhojtal has an area of 31 km^{2}

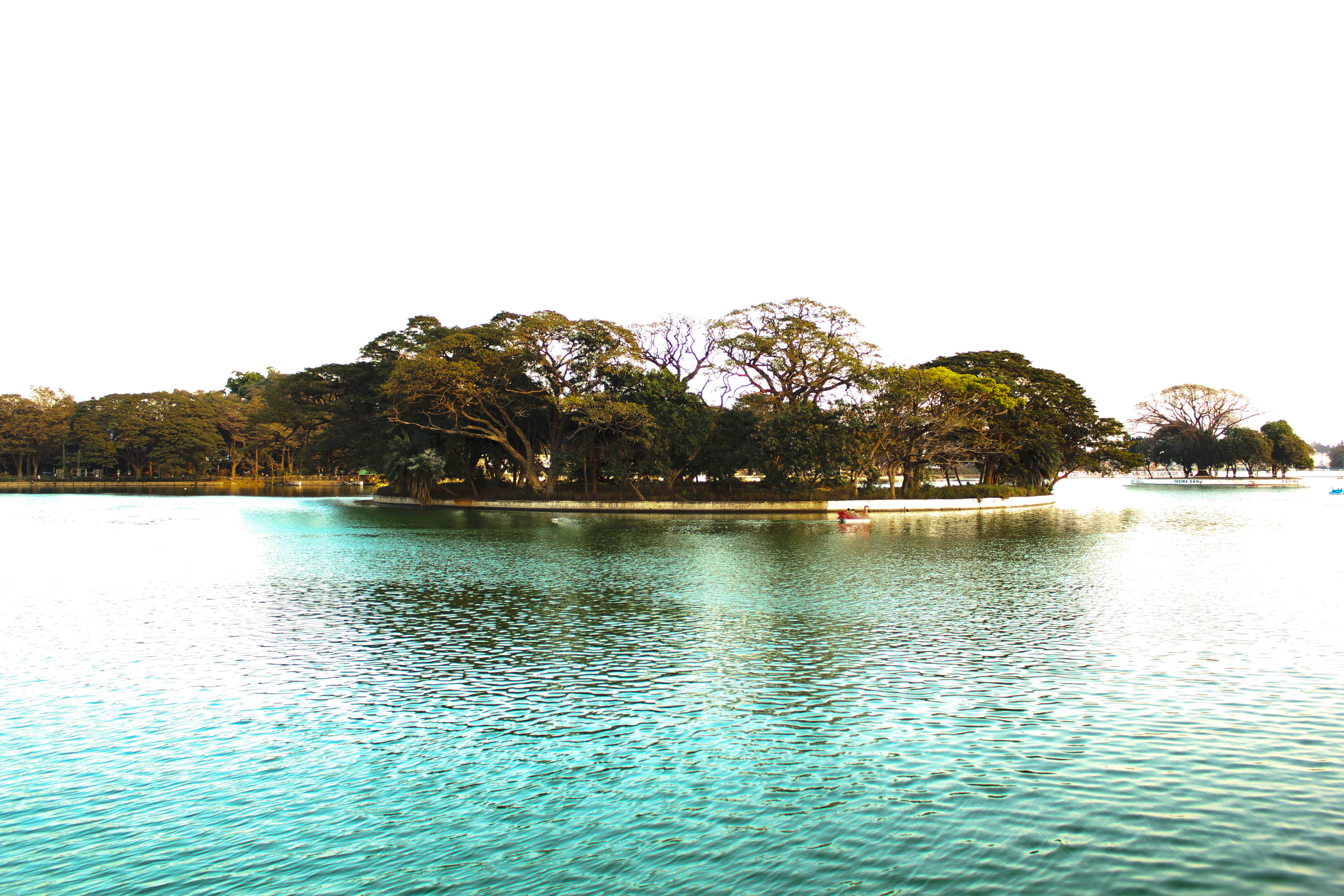
Bangalore has highest number of small lakes

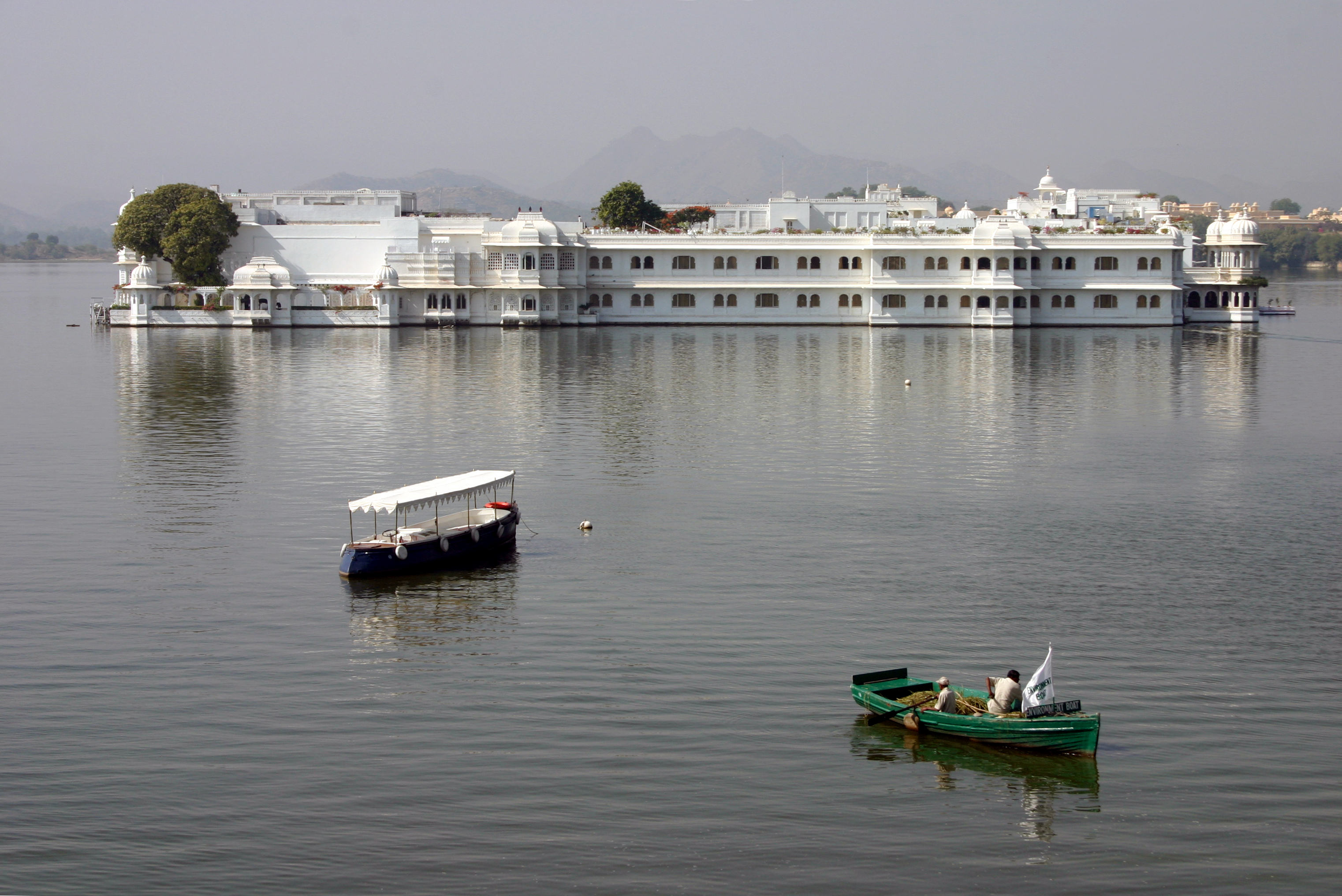
Lake Palace (Jag Niwas) in Lake Pichola, Udaipur, Rajasthan

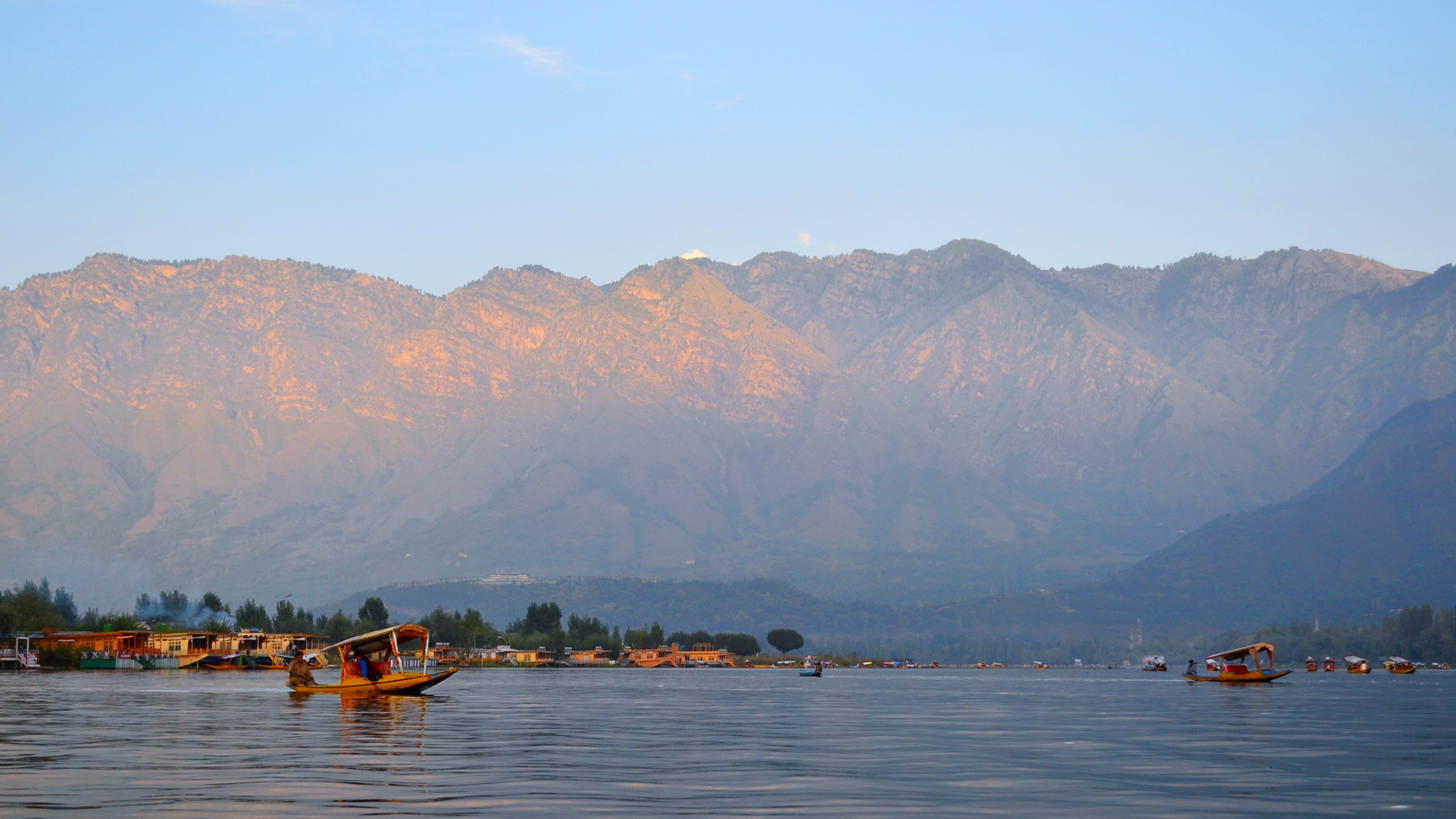
Shikaras on Dal Lake, Jammu & Kashmir

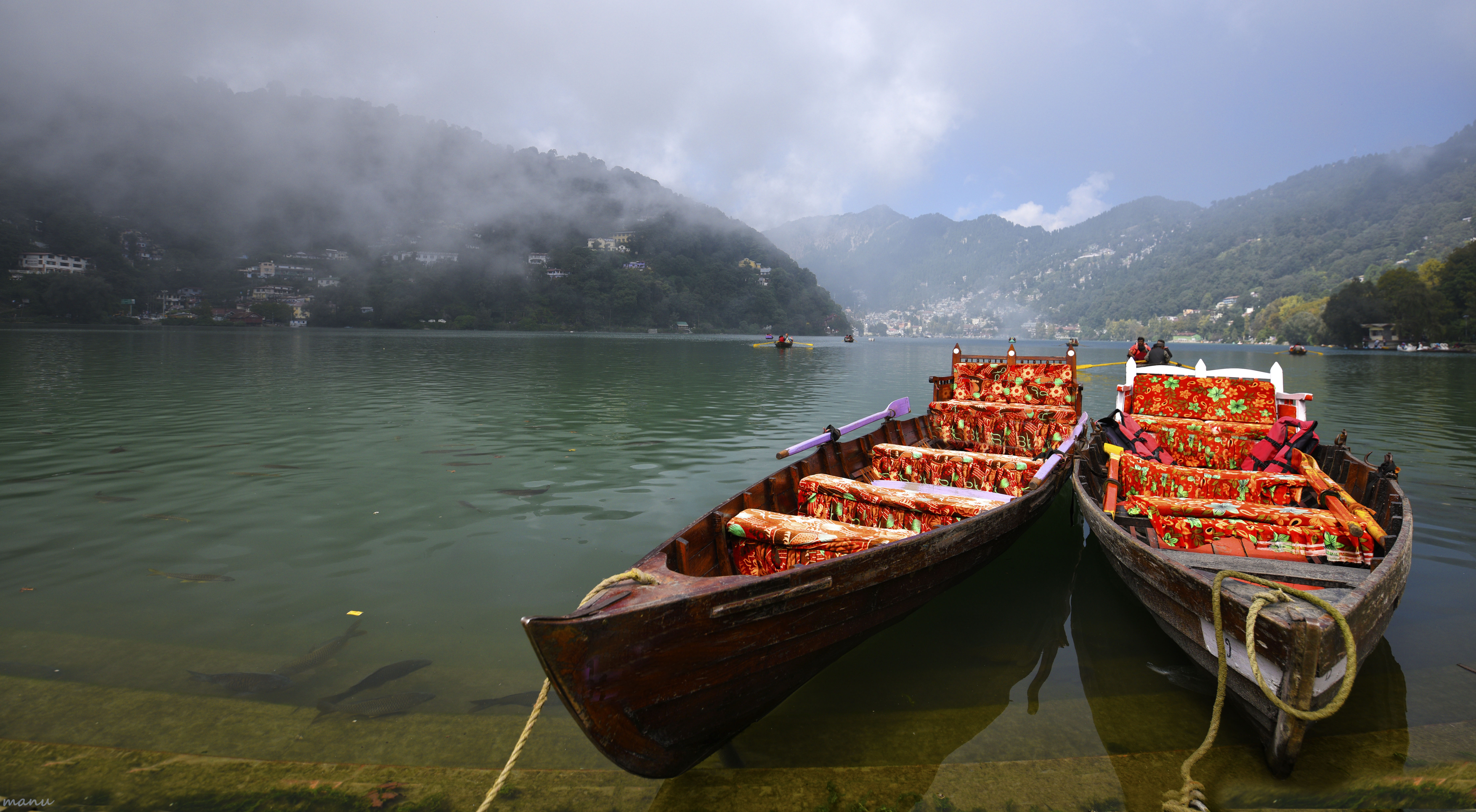
Boats on Naini Lake, Kumaon, Uttarakhand

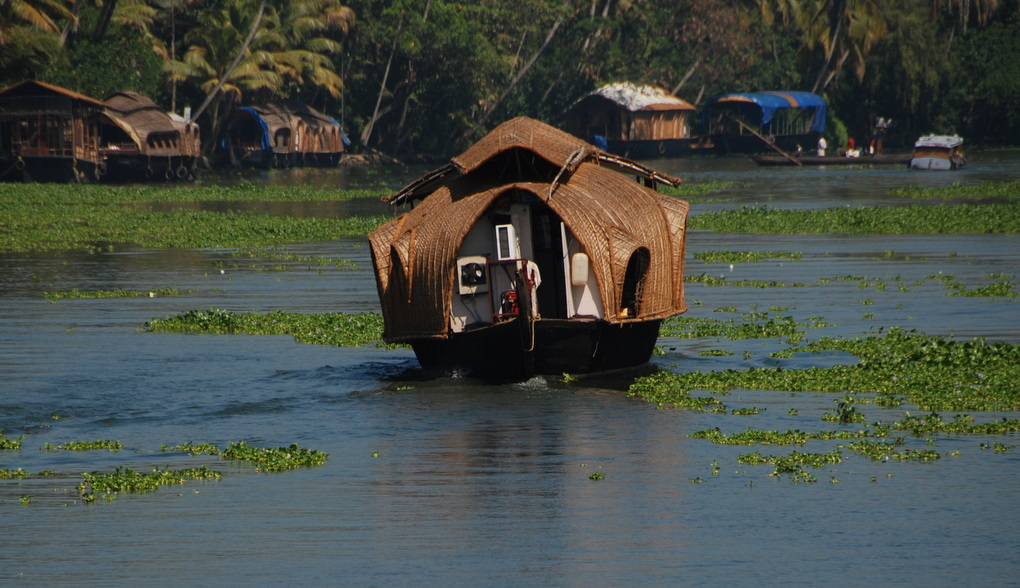
House boat on Vembanad Lake, Kerala

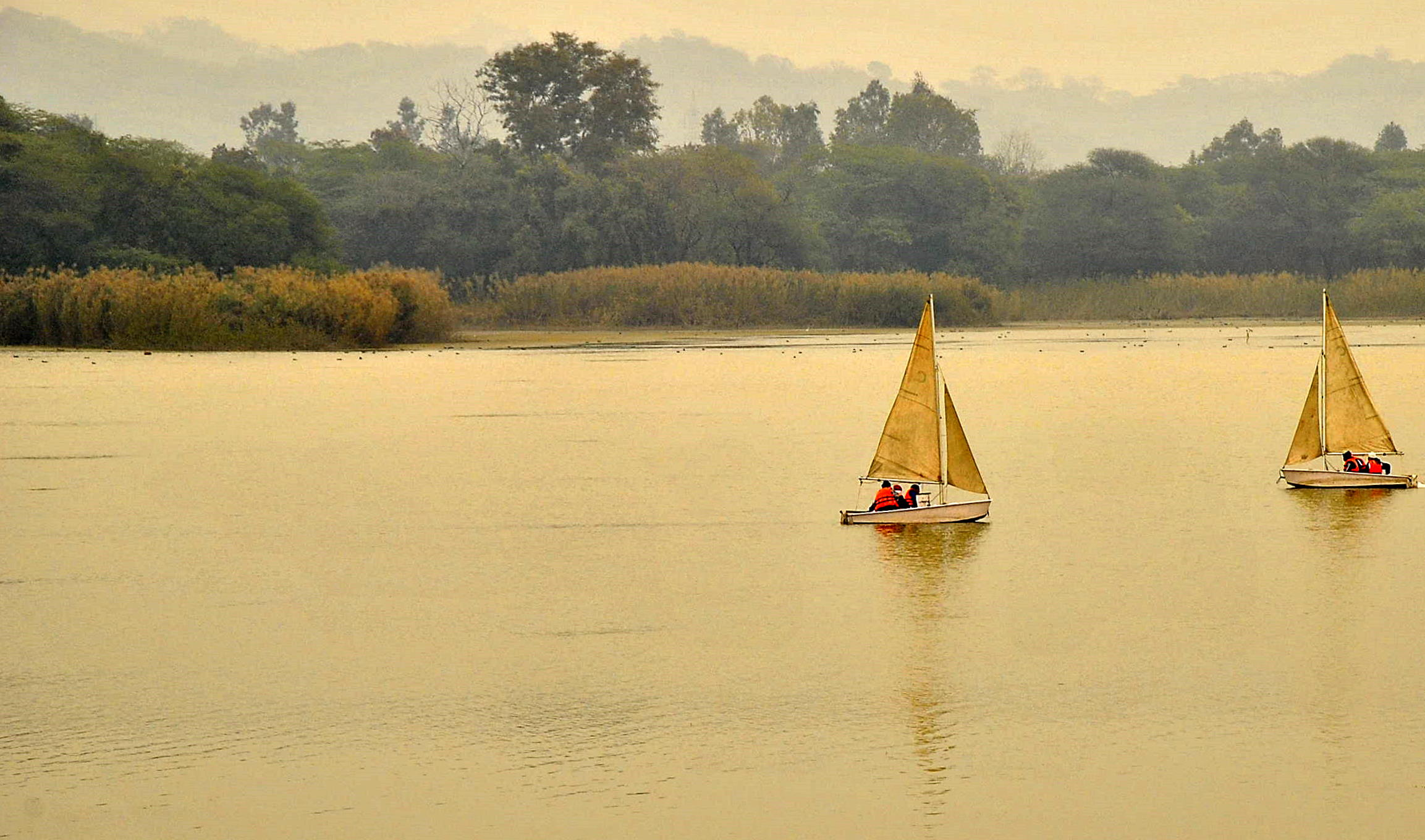
Sailing on the Sukhna Lake, Chandigarh, India

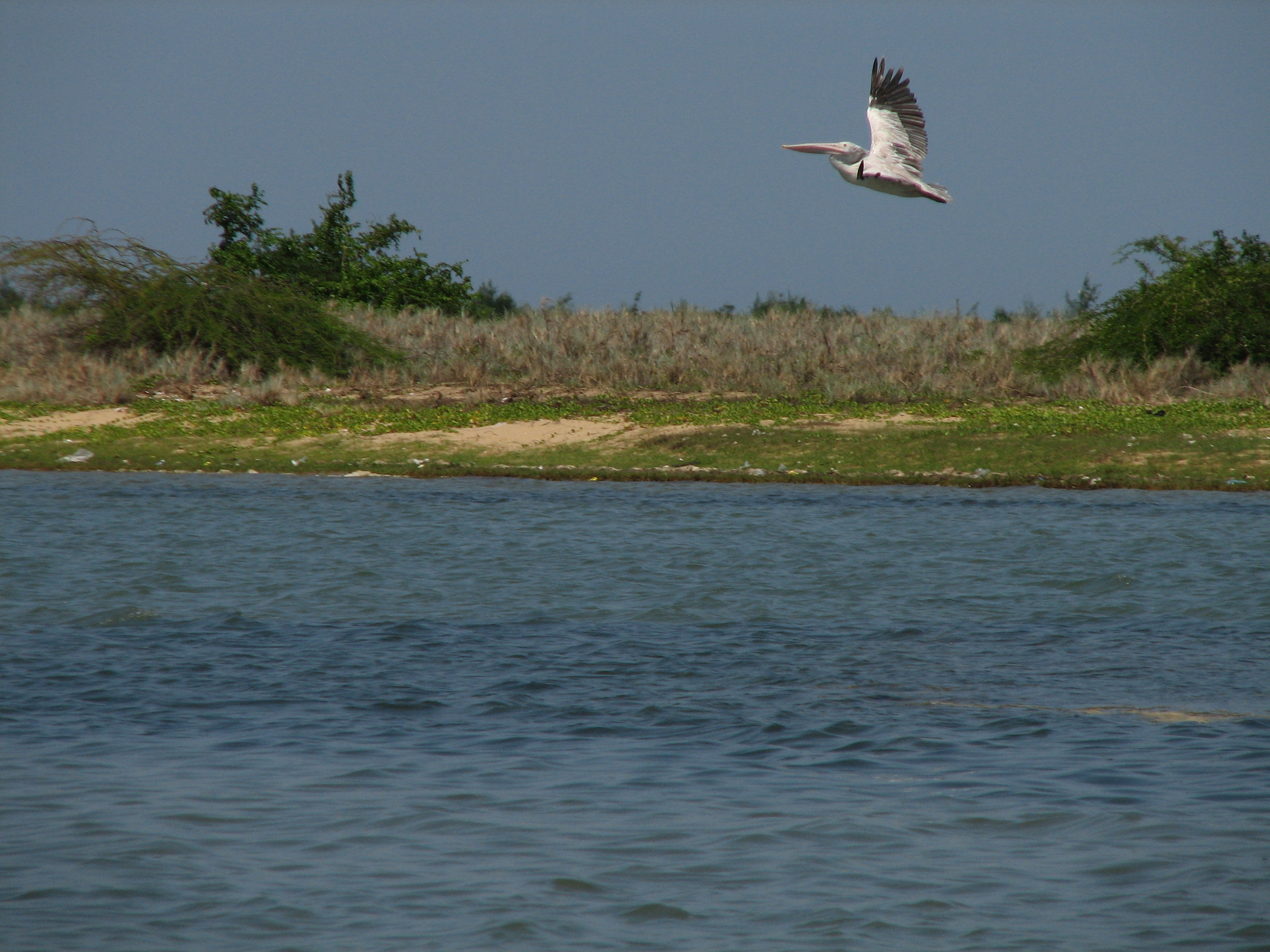
Spot-billed pelican at Pulicat Lake, Andhra Pradesh

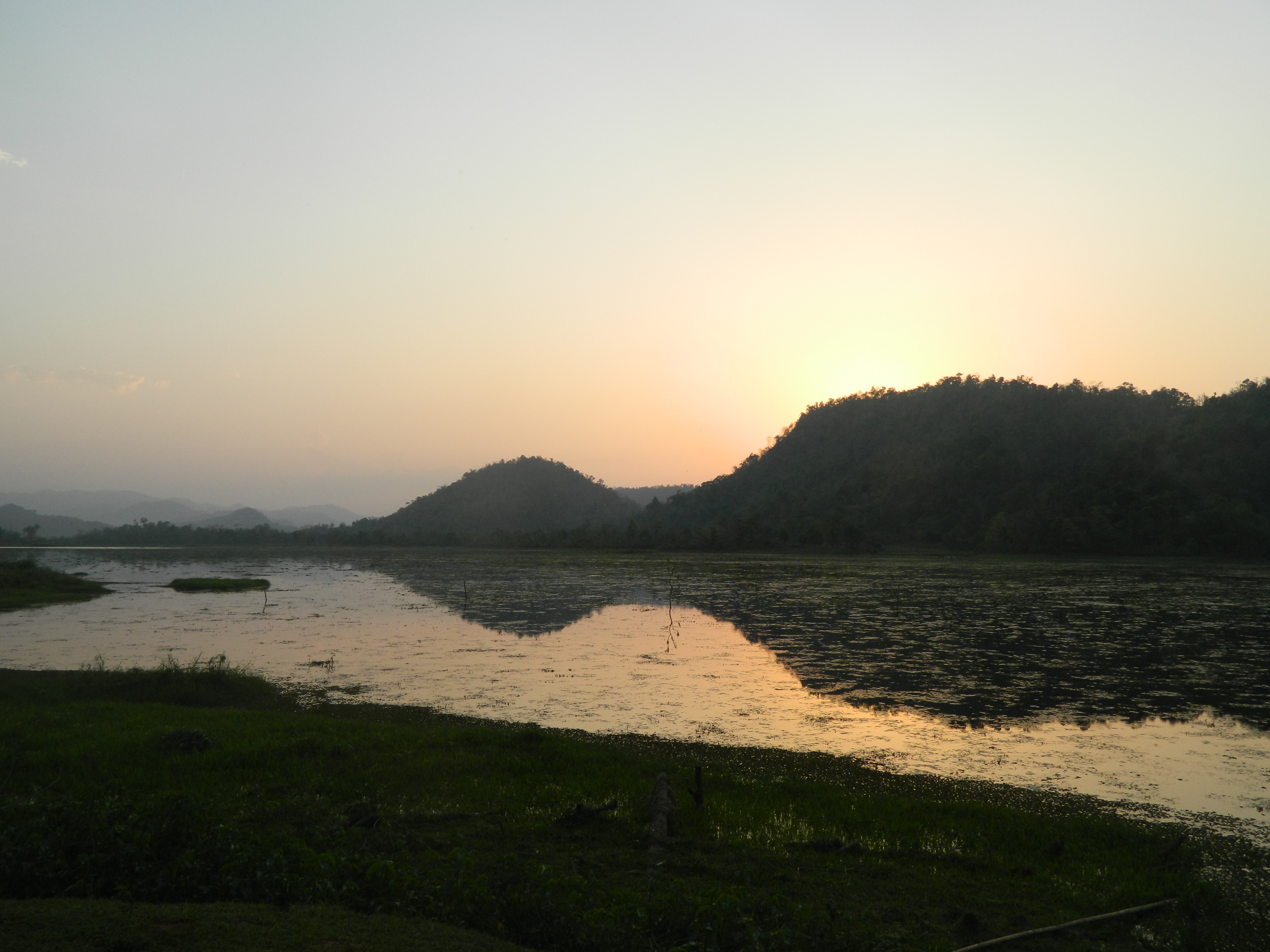
Chandubi Lake, Assam

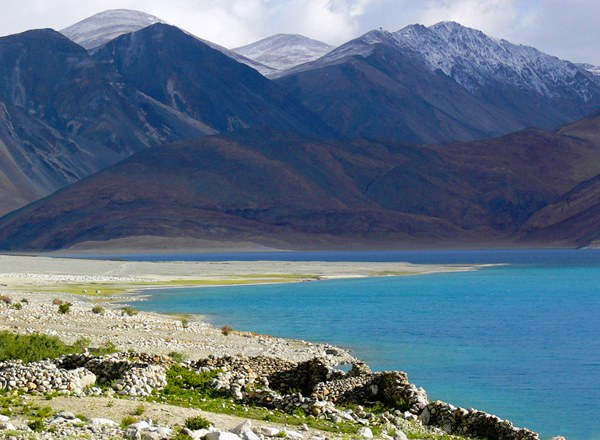
Pangong Lake, Ladakh

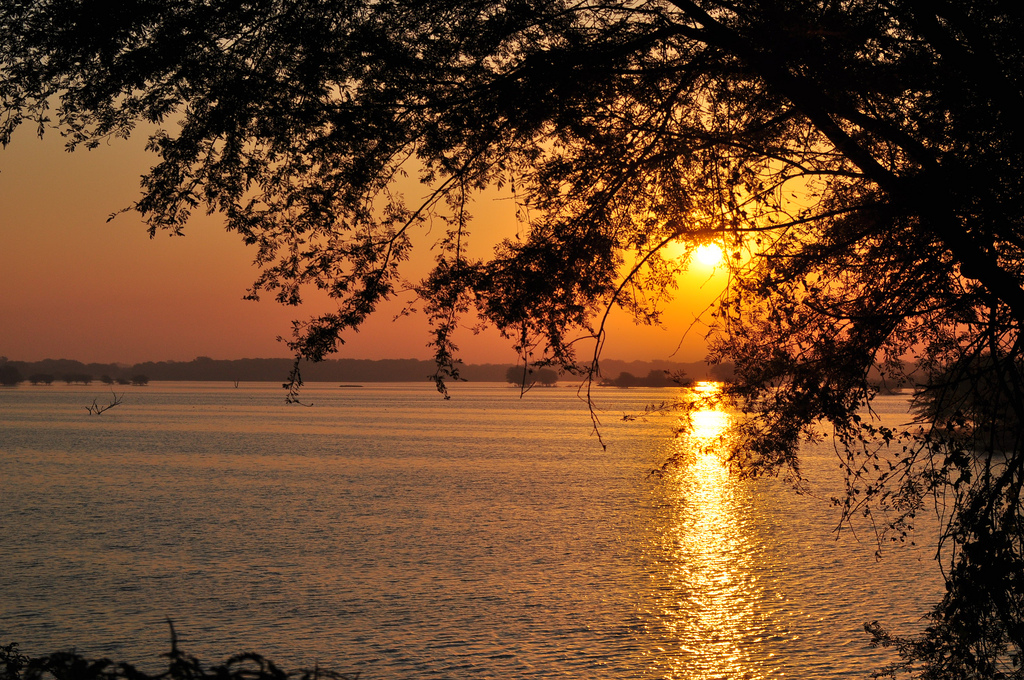
Thol Lake, Gujarat

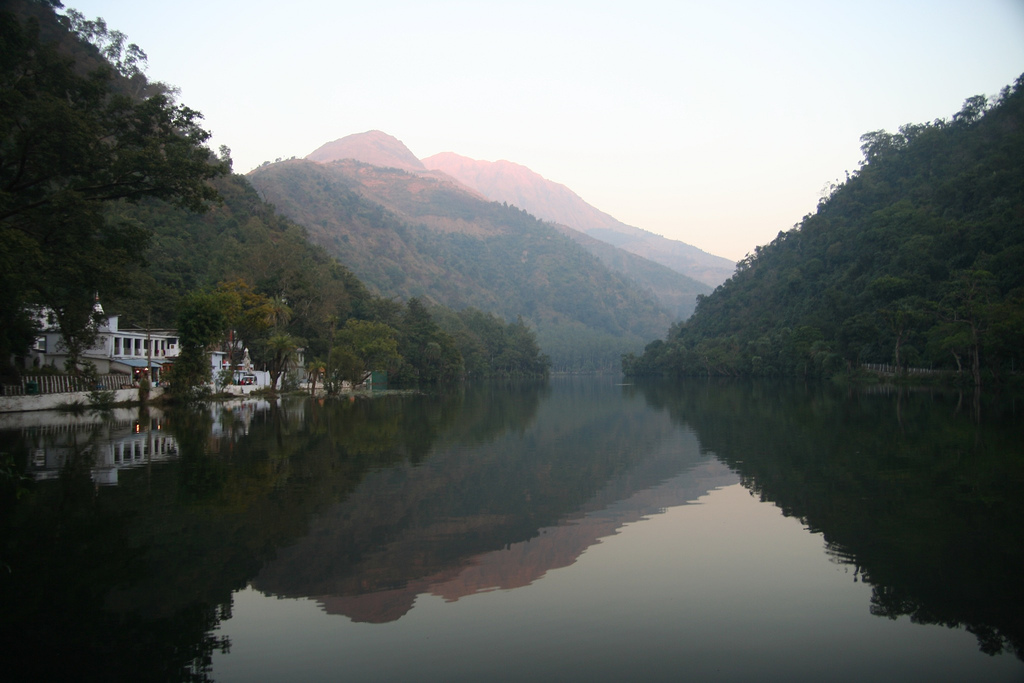
Renuka Lake, Himachal Pradesh

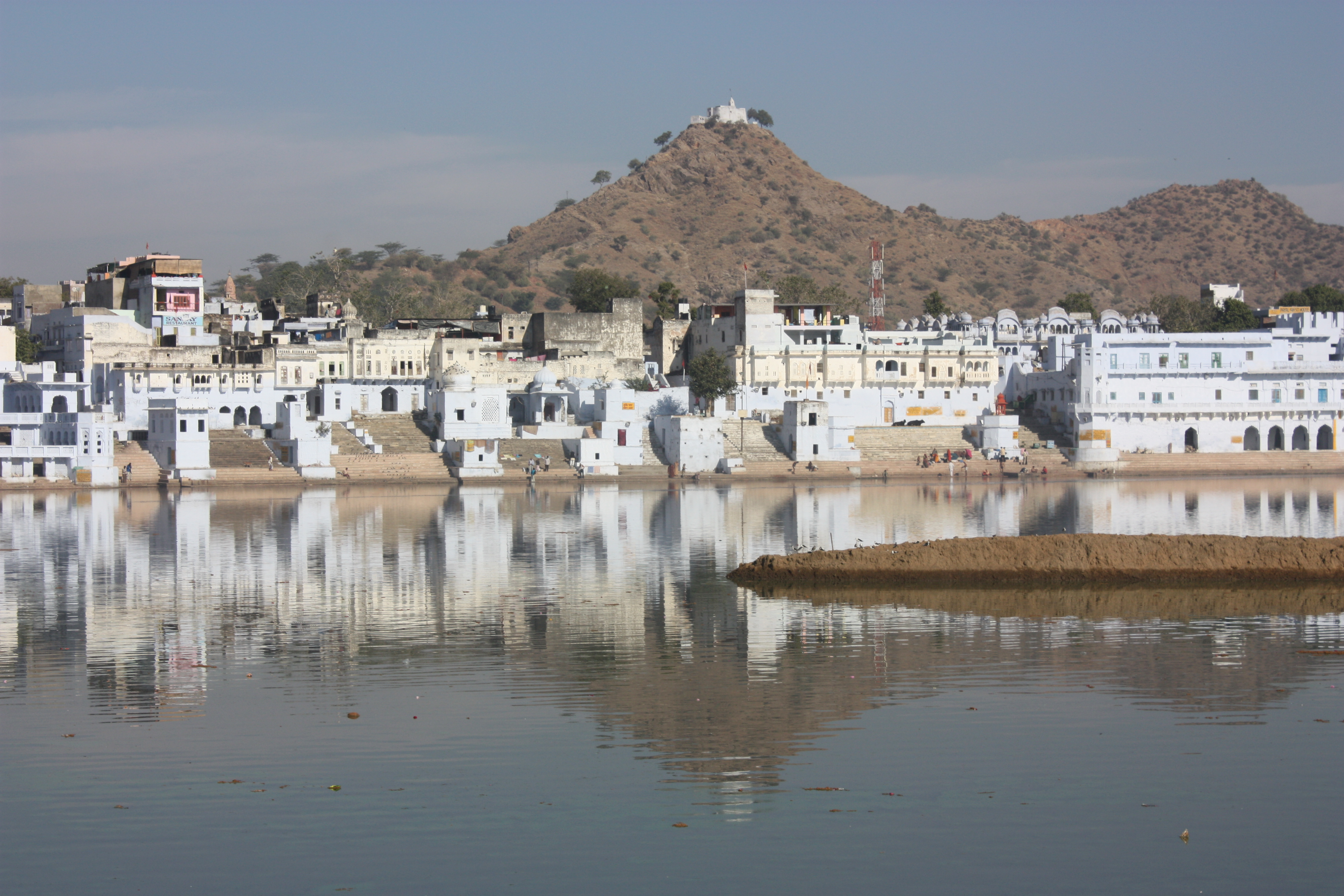
The ghats of Pushkar Lake, Rajasthan

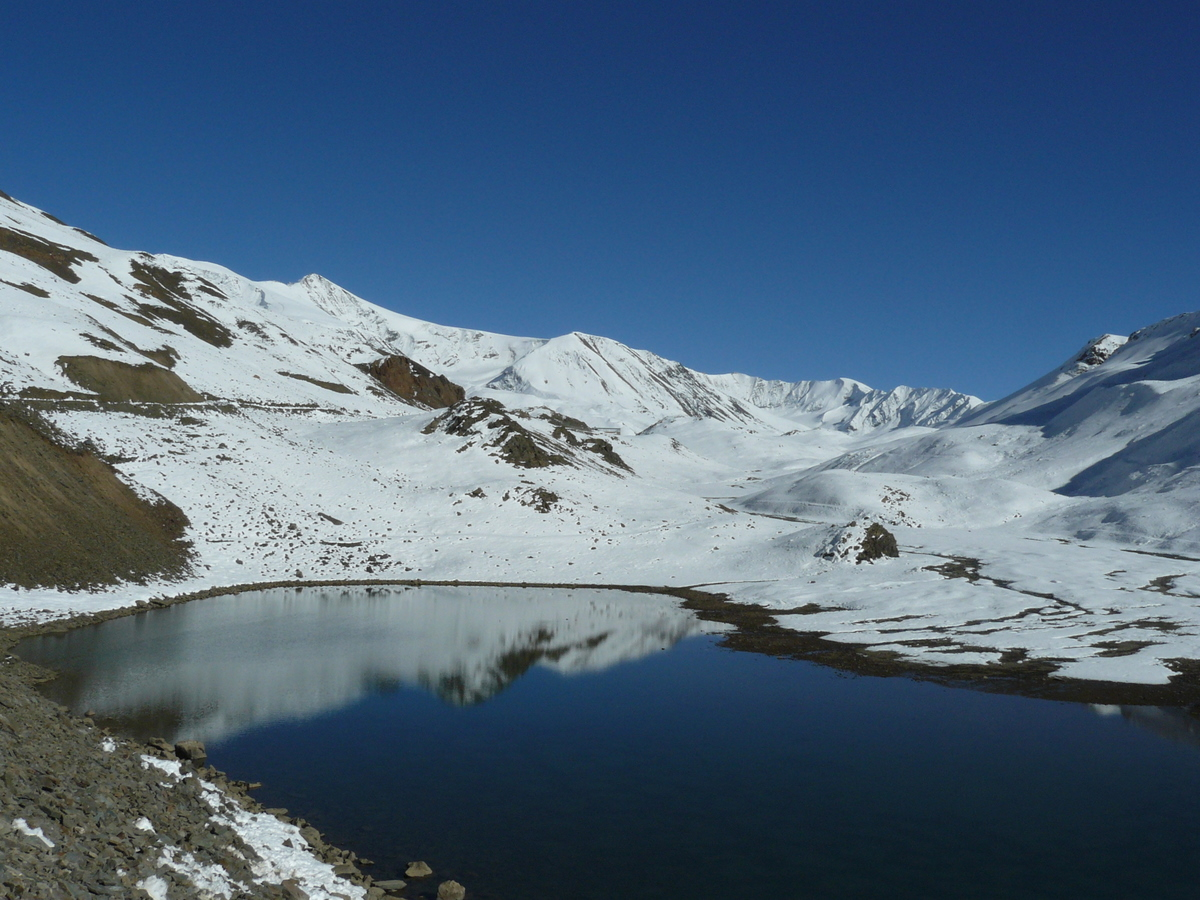
Suraj Tal, Himachal Pradesh

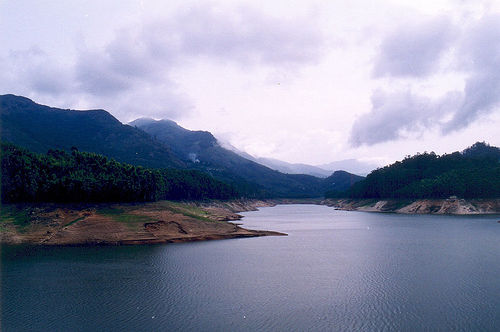
Manasbal Lake, Kashmir

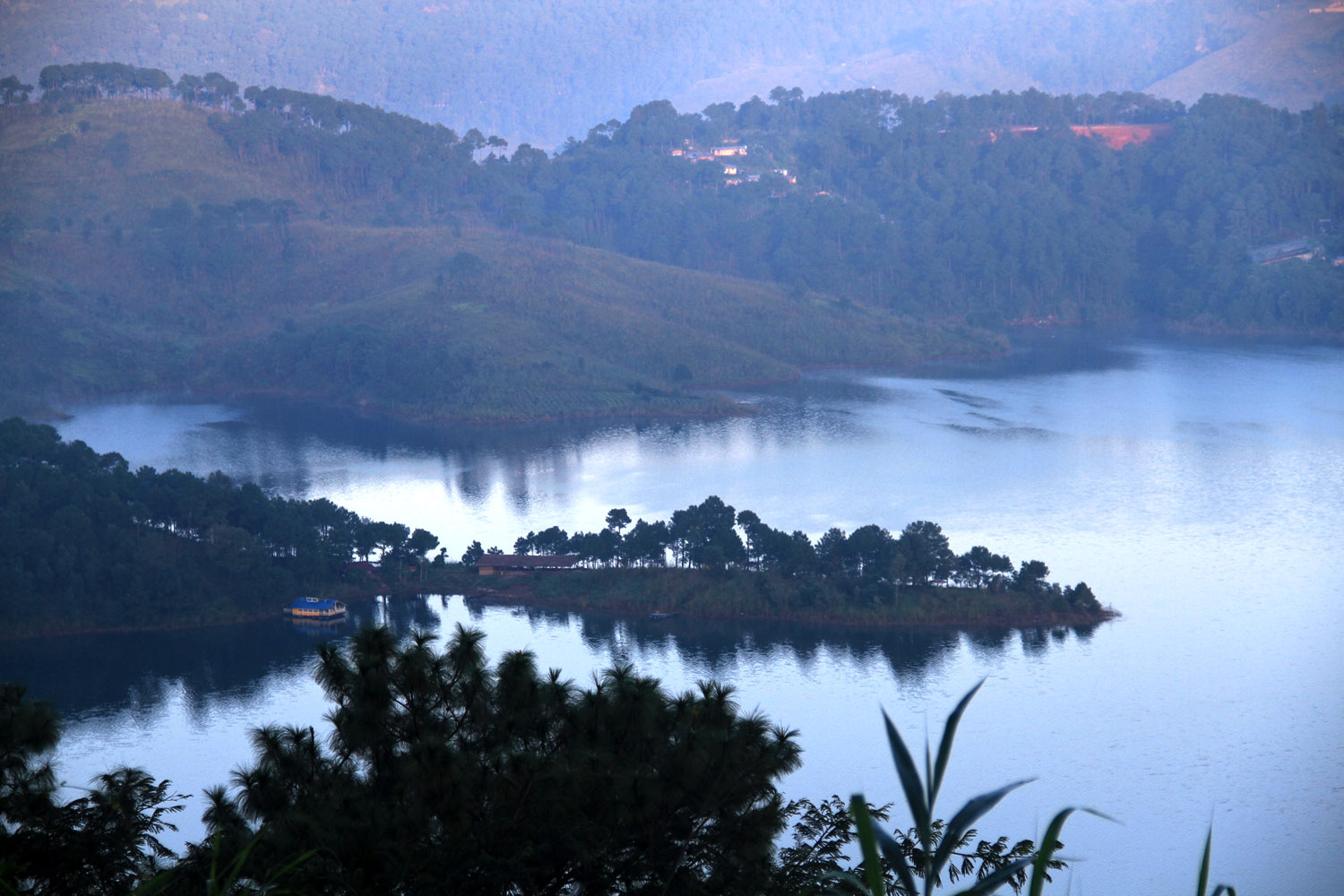
Umiam Lake, Shillong, Meghalaya

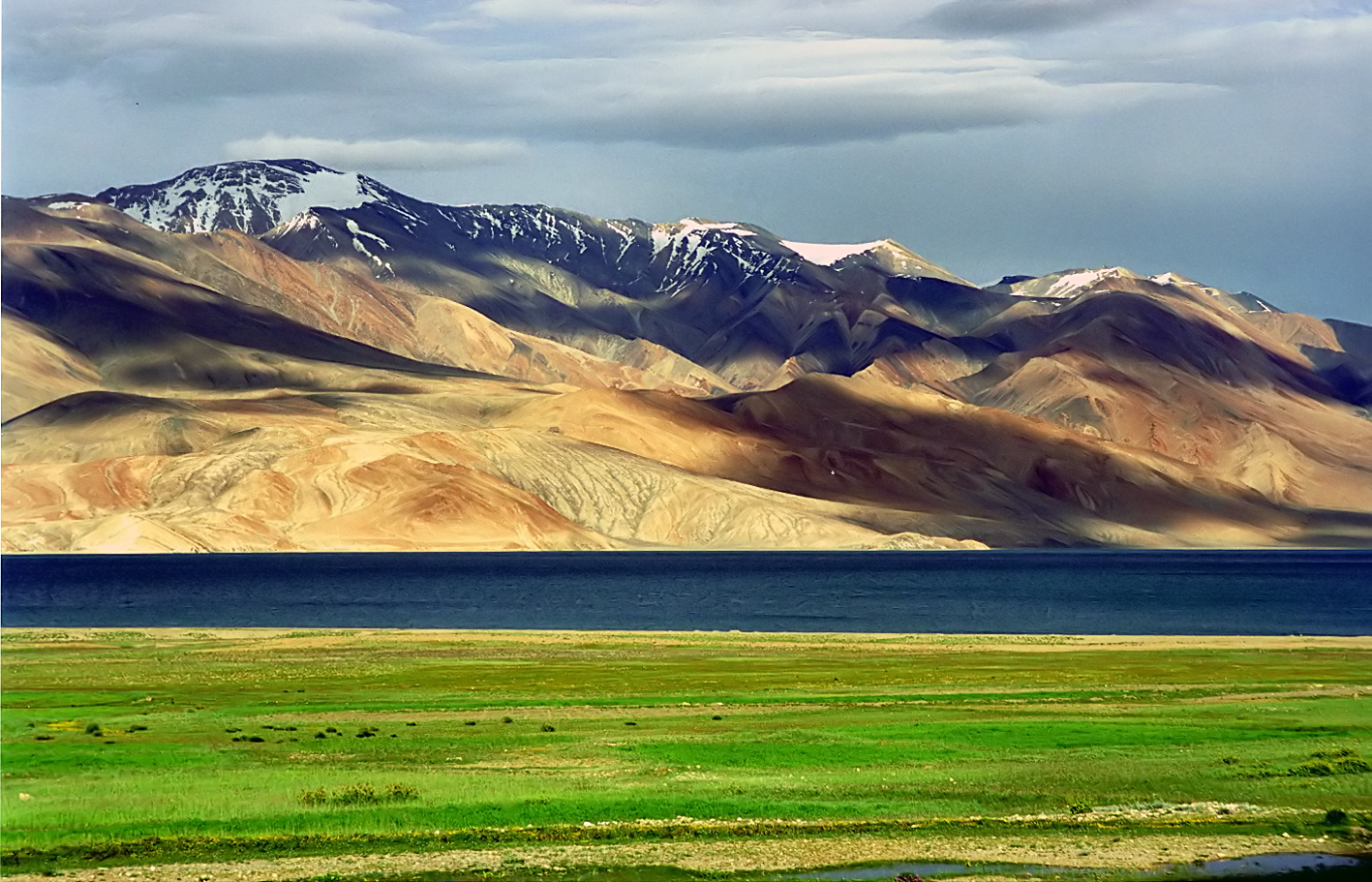
Tsomoriri, Ladakh

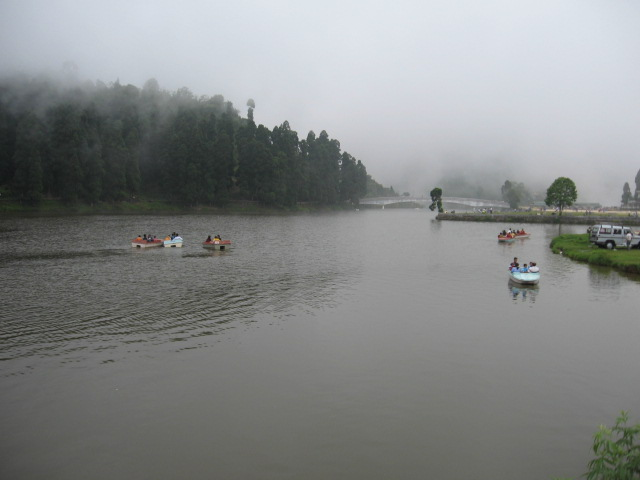
Sumendu Lake, Mirik, West Bengal

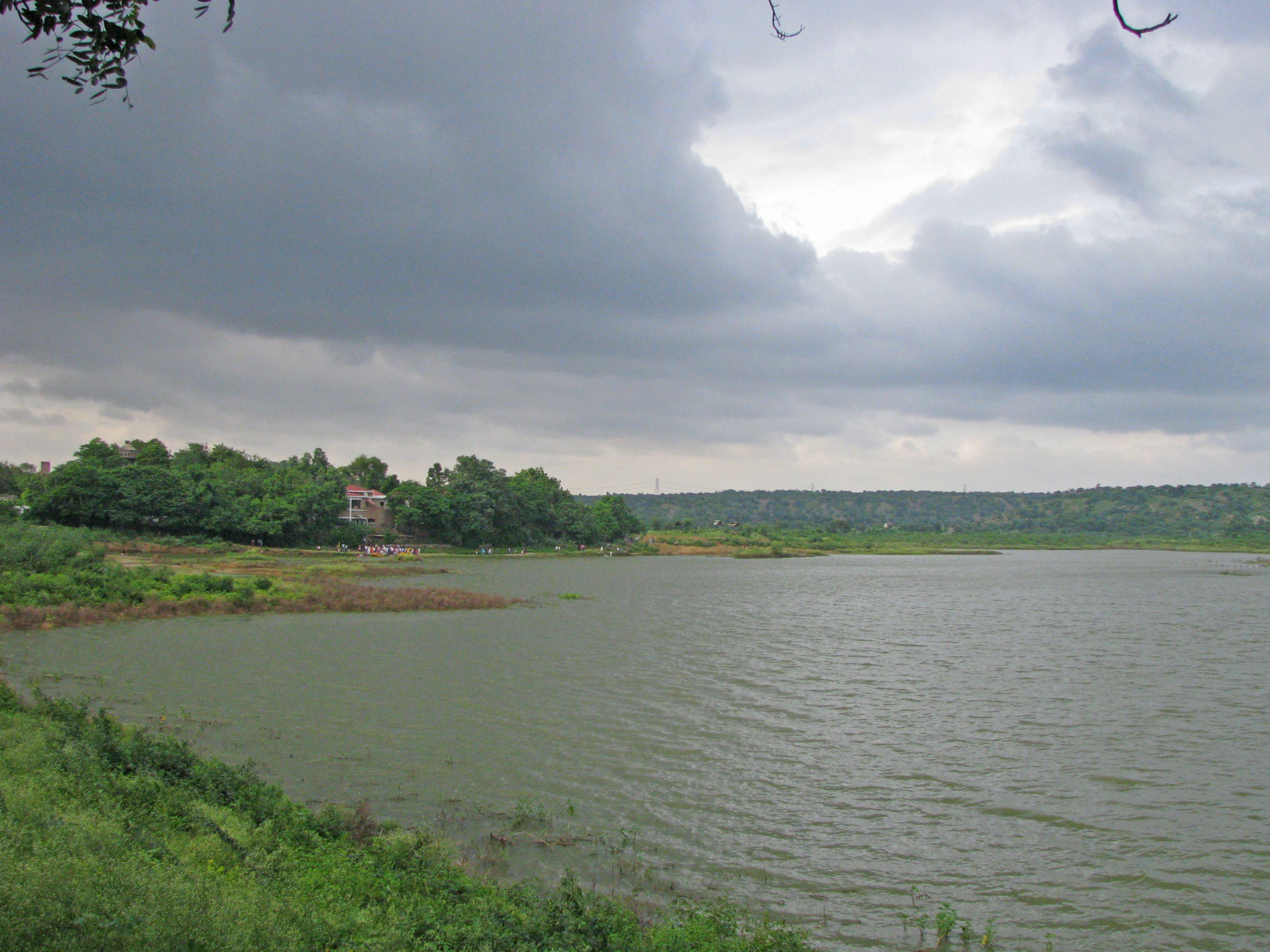
Damdama Lake, Haryana

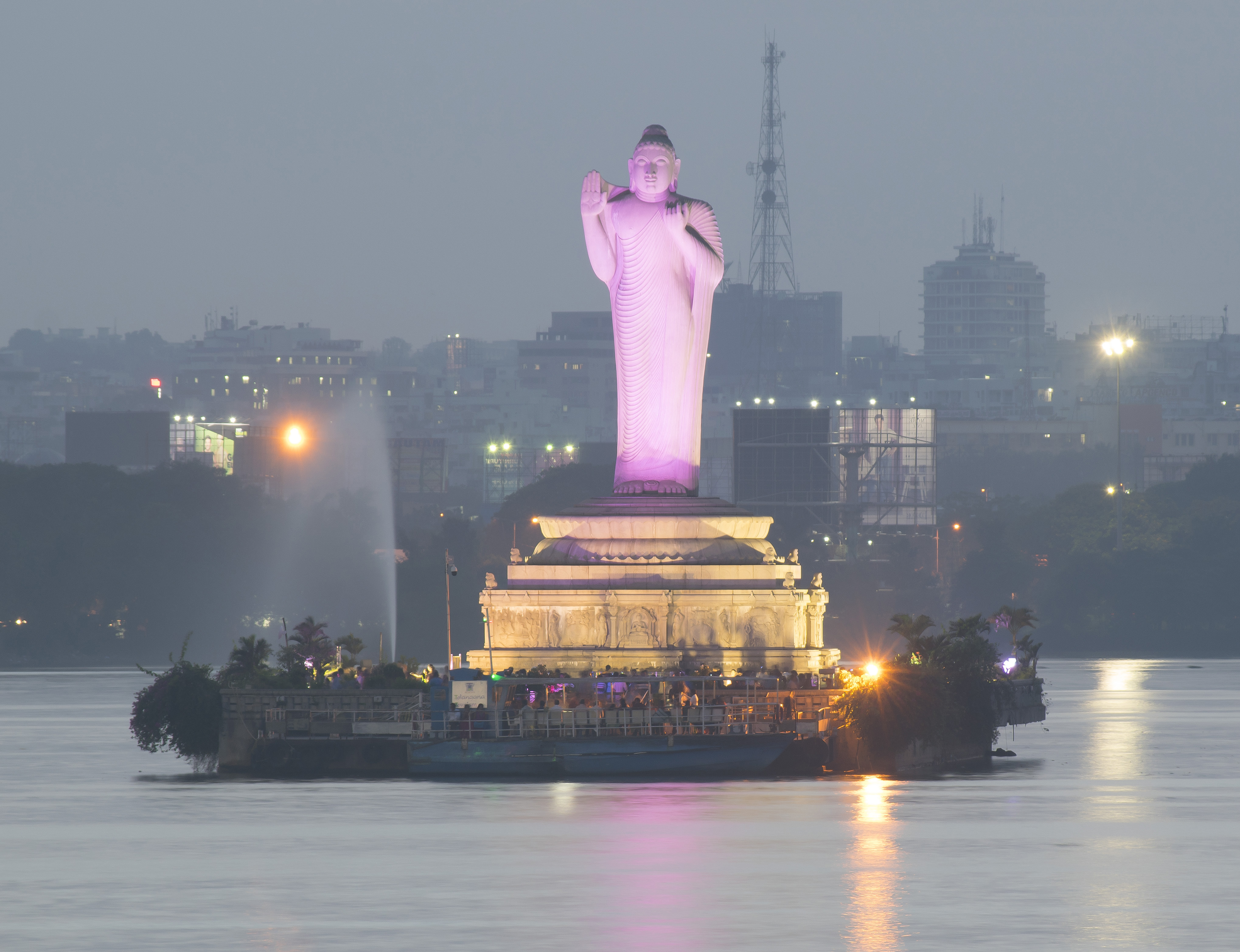
Hussain Sagar, Hyderabad, Telangana

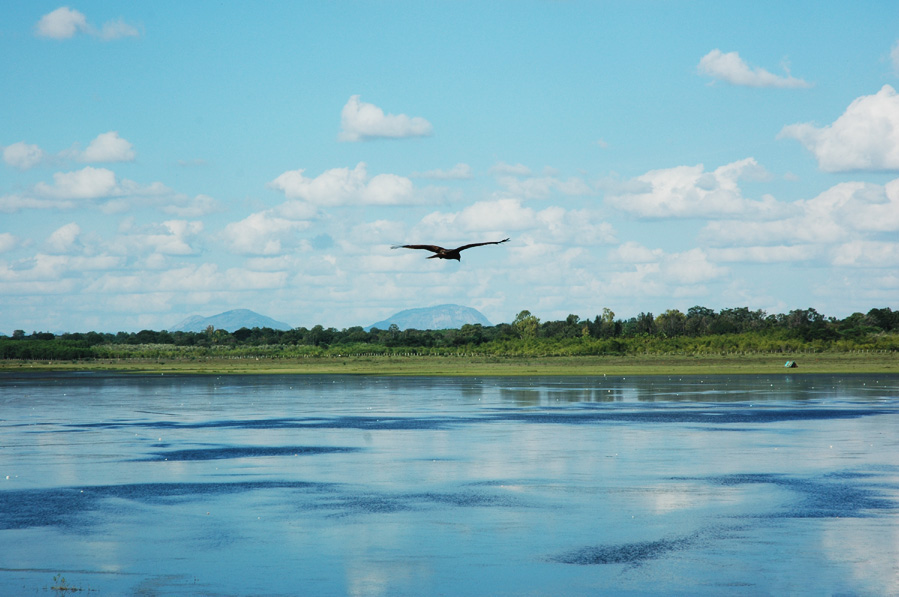
A bird flying over Hesaraghatta Lake in Bangalore, Karnataka

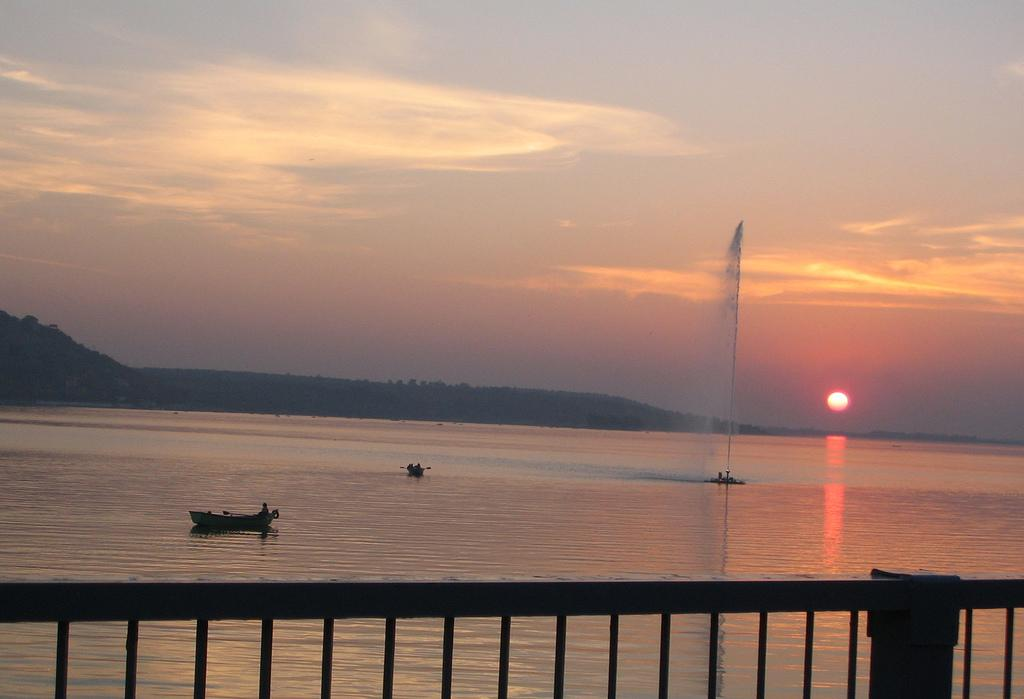
Upper Lake (Bhopal), Madhya Pradesh

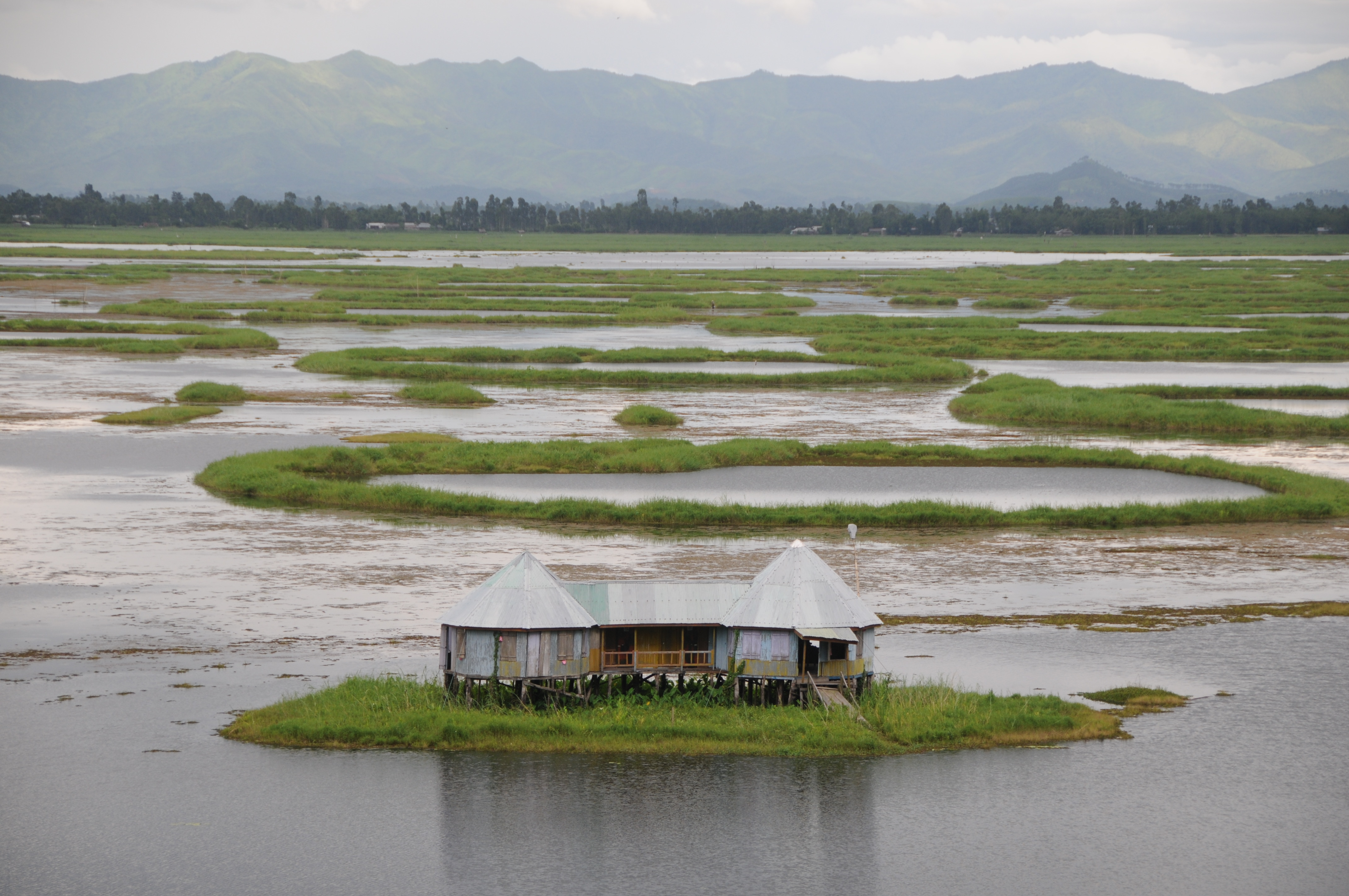
Loktak Lake, Manipur

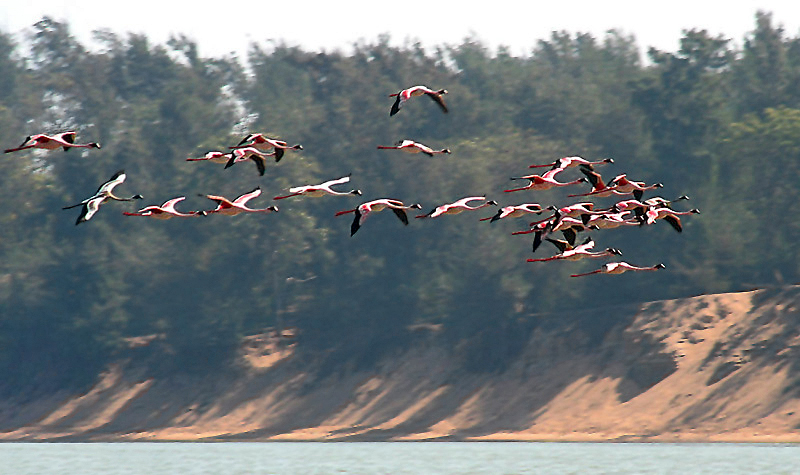
Lesser Flamingos at Chilika Lake, Orissa

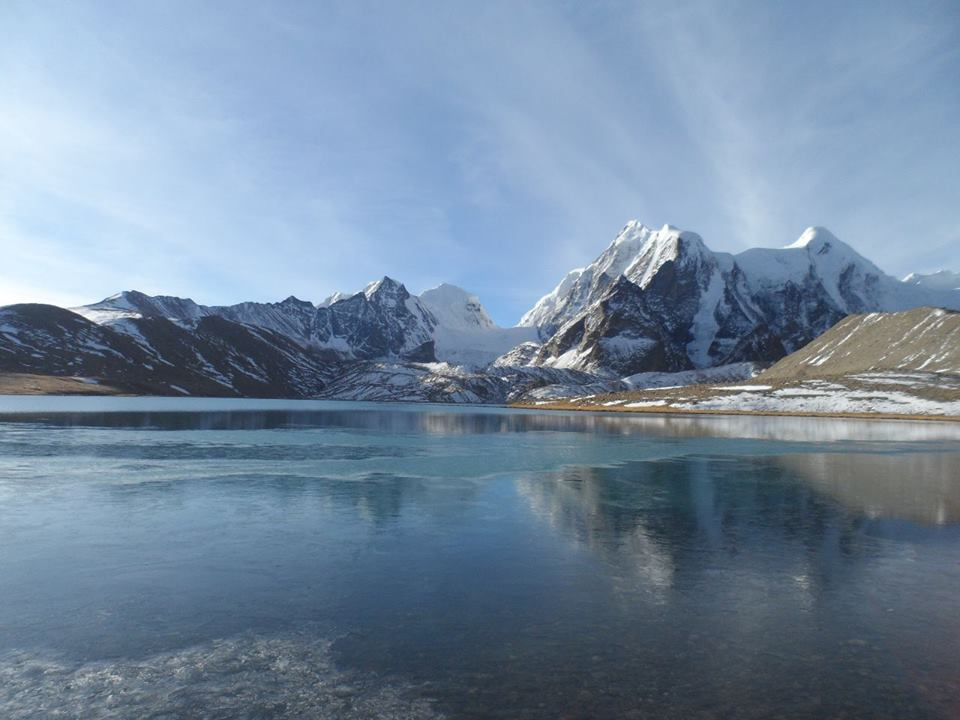
Gurudongmar Lake, Sikkim

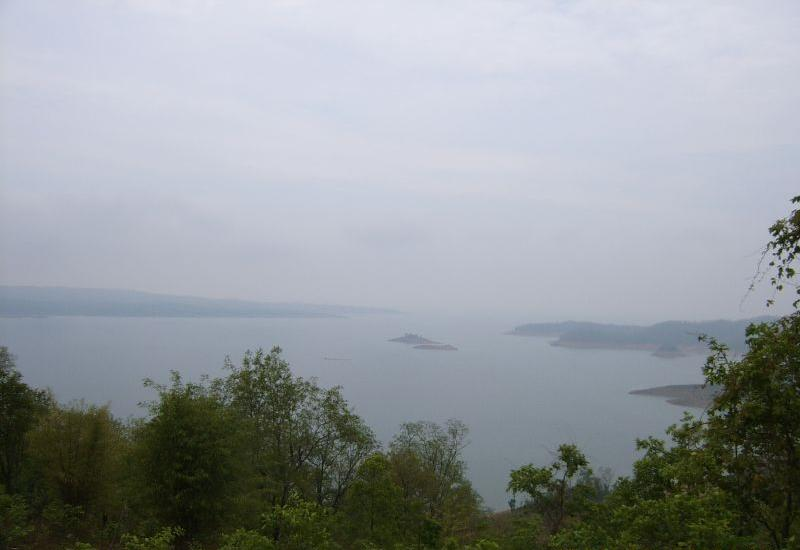
Ropar Wetland, Punjab

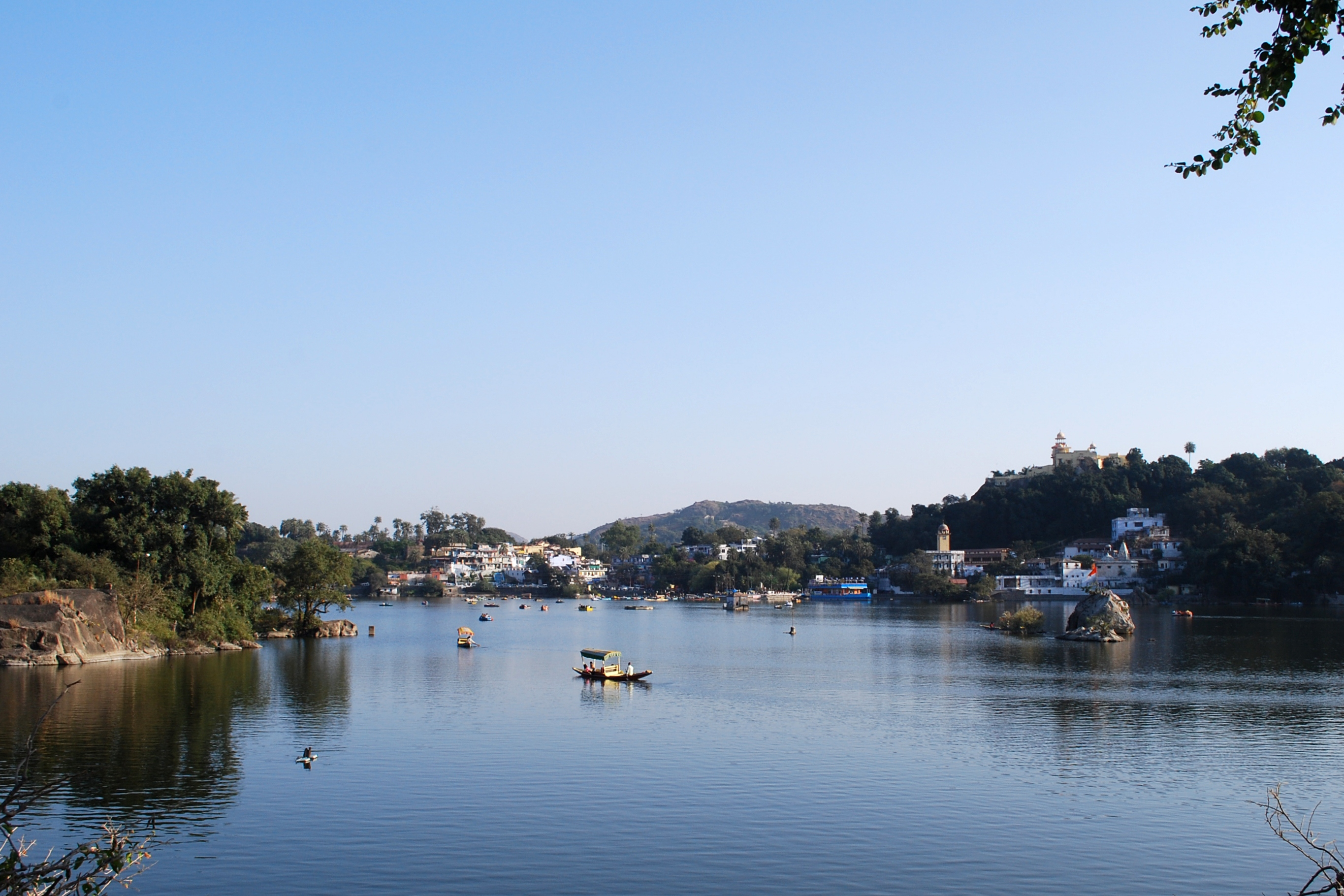
Nakki Lake, Mount Abu, Rajasthan

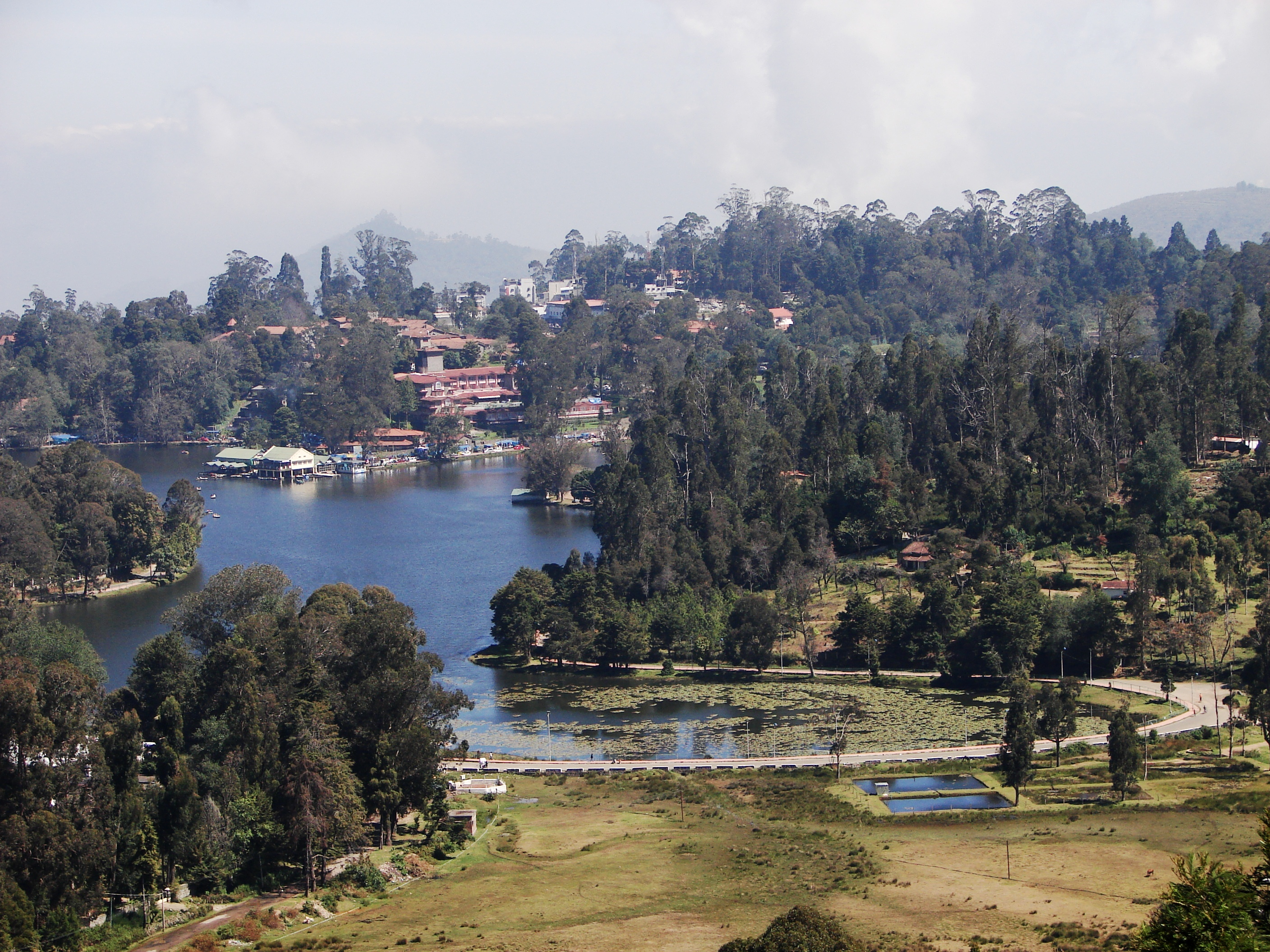
Kodaikanal Lake, Tamil Nadu

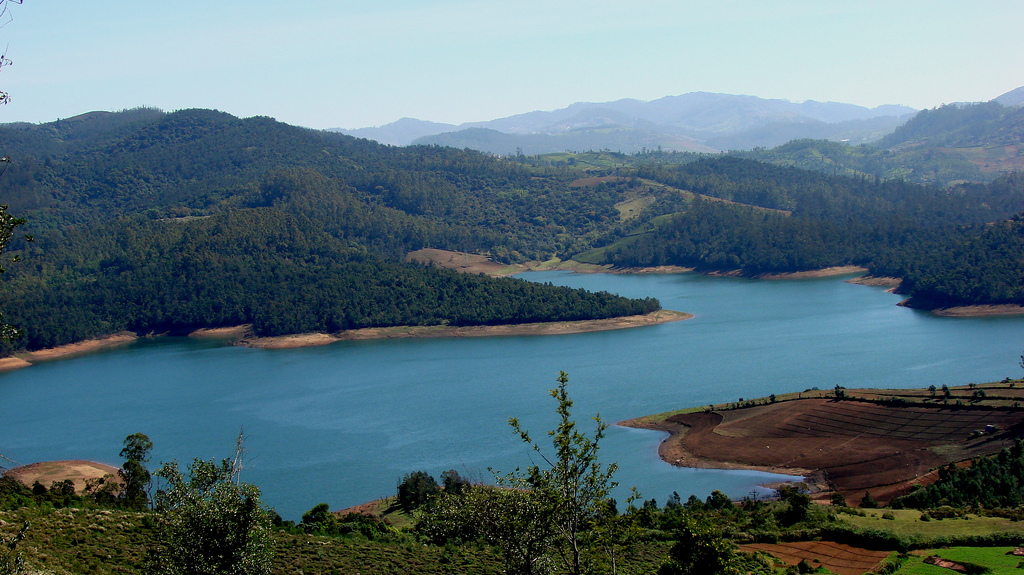
Emerald Lake, Ooty, Tamil Nadu

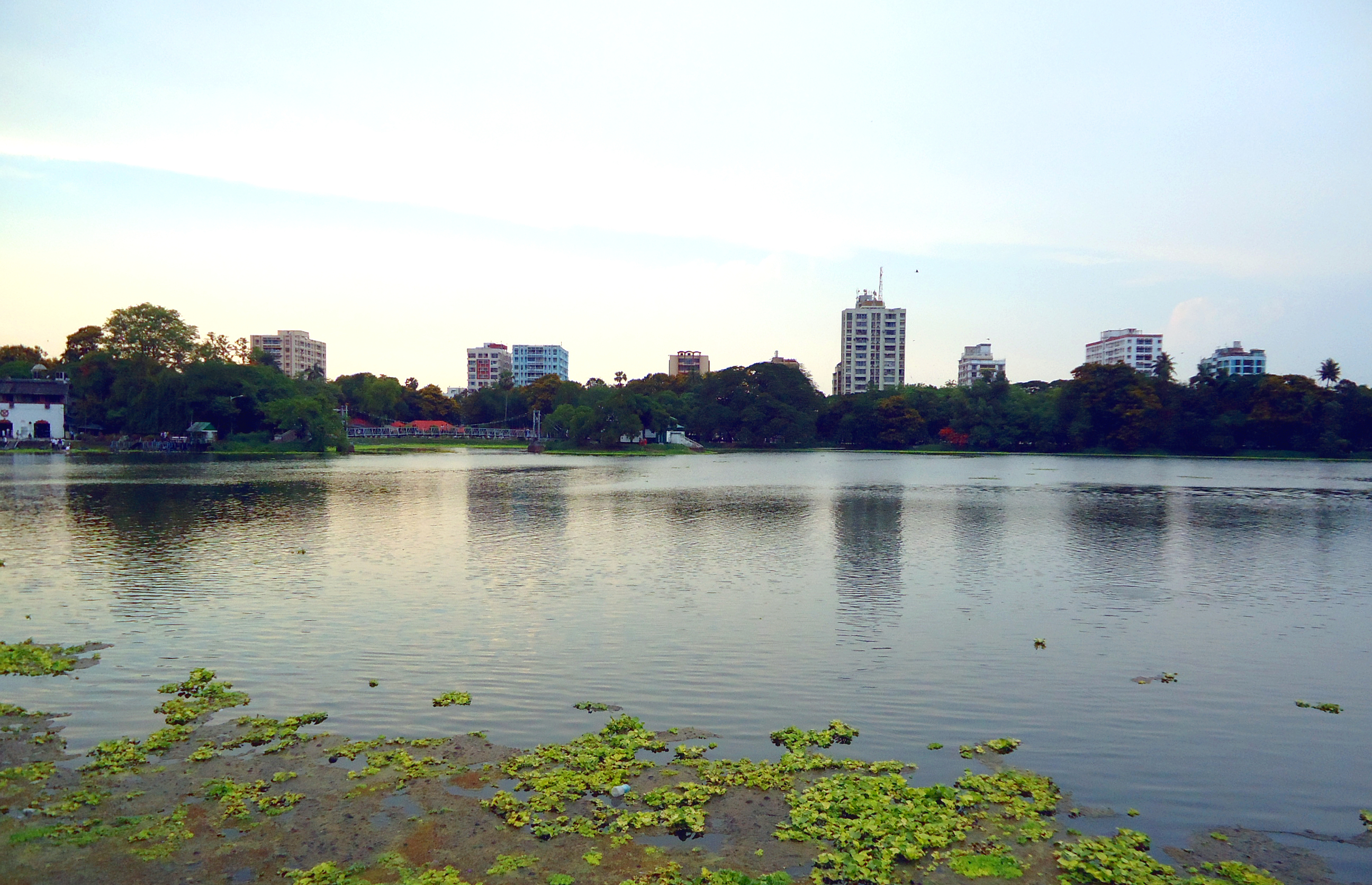
Rabindra Sarobar, Kolkata, West Bengal

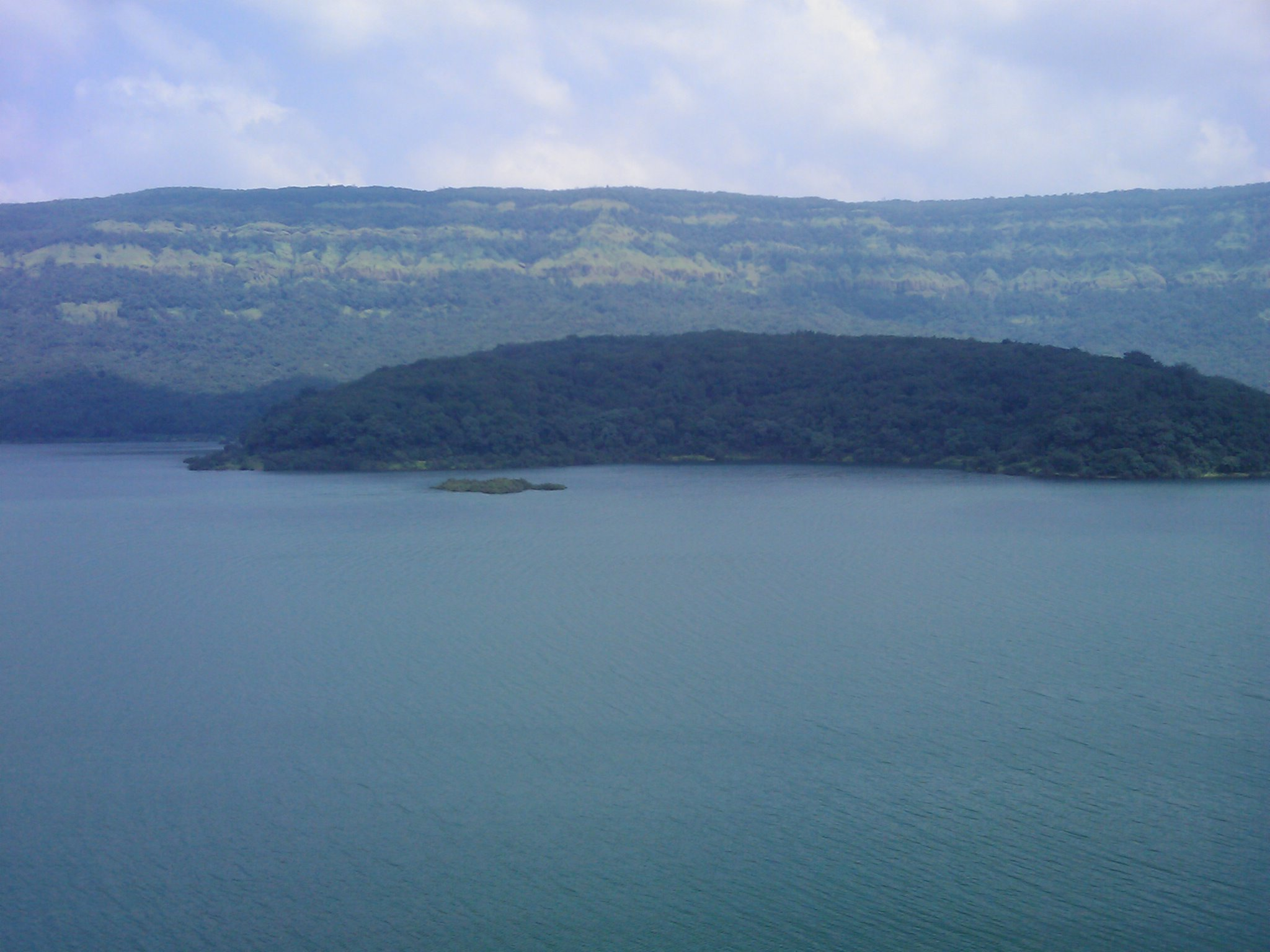
Shivasagar Lake, Maharashtra

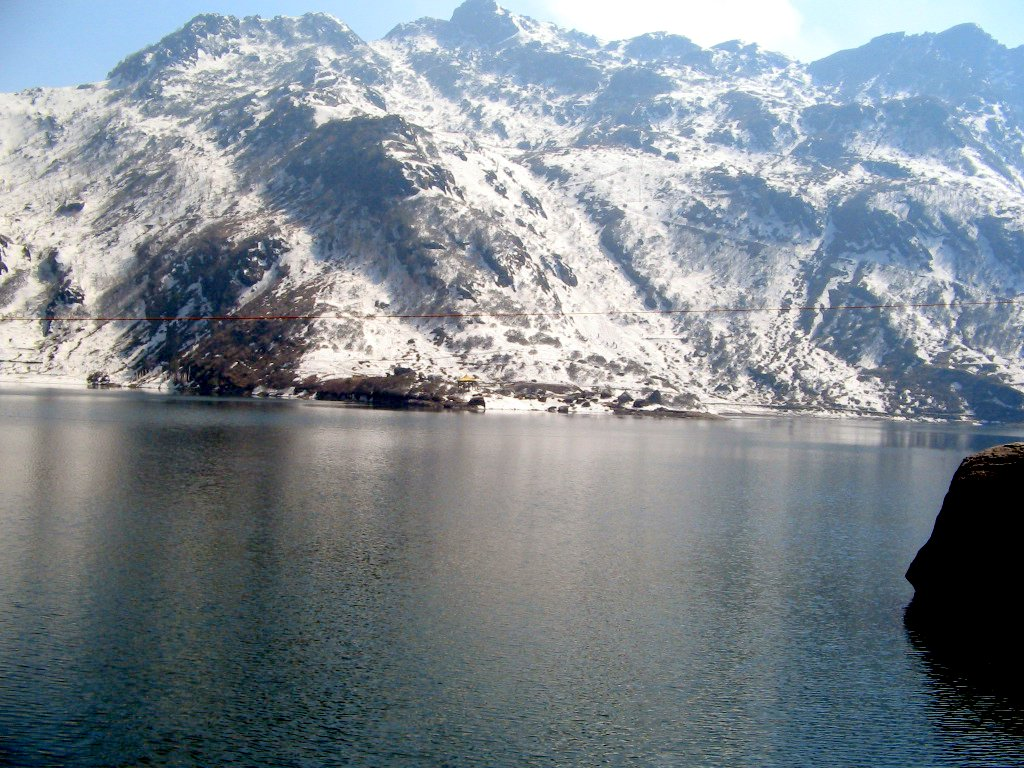
Tsongmo Lake, Sikkim

== Andaman and Nicobar Islands ==
- Dilthaman Tank in Port Blair

== Andhra Pradesh ==
- Kolleru Lake
- Kondakarla Ava
- Kaniairi Lake
- Cumbum
- Pulicat Lake

== Arunachal Pradesh ==
- Ganga Lake (India)
- Sangetsar Lake

== Assam ==
- Urpad Bil
- Samaguri Beel
- Morikolong Beel
- Haflong Lake
- Sivasagar Tank
- Joysagar Tank
- Gourisagar Pukhuri
- Chandubi Lake
- Deepor Beel
- Son Beel
- Maguri Bil
- Silsako Lake
- Saromanaha Beel

== Bihar ==
- Kanwar Lake Bird Sanctuary
- Ghora Katora Lake

== Chandigarh ==
- Sukhna Lake

== Chhattisgarh ==
- Vivekananda Sarovar [ Budha Talab ]
- Telibandha Lake

== Dadra and Nagar Haveli and Daman and Diu ==
- Madhuban Reservoir
- Vanganga Lake
- Mirasol Lake

== Delhi ==
- Bhalswa Lake
- Hauz Khas Tank
- Sanjay Lake

== Goa ==
- Mayem Lake
- Nanda Lake

== Gujarat ==
- Chimnabai Lake
- Gopi Talav
- Hamirsar Lake
- Kankaria Lake
- Nal Sarovar
- Narayan Sarovar
- Sardar Sarovar Dam
- Thol Lake
- Vastrapur Lake
- Saputara Lake
- Bor Talav
- Dharoi Dam
- Damodar Kund
- Gomti Lake
- Shakoor Lake
- Soor Sagar Lake (Sursagar Lake)
- Lakhota Lake
- Para Lake
- Nagalpur Lake

== Haryana ==
- Badkhal Lake
- Blue Bird Lake
- Brahma Sarovar
- Damdama Lake
- Karna Lake
- Sannihit Sarovar
- Surajkund
- Tilyar Lake
- Bhindawas Lake

== Himachal Pradesh ==
- Bhrigu Lake (4235 m)
- Chandra Taal (4300 m)
- Chander Naun (4260 m)
- Dashair Lake (4270 m)
- Dal Lake
- Dehnasar Lake (4280 m)
- Dhankar Lake (4270 m)
- Ghadhasaru Lake (3470 m)
- Gobind Sagar (20000 m)
- Kamrunag Lake (3334 m)
- Kareri Lake (2934 m)
- Khajjiar Lake (1951 m)
- Lama Dal (3960 m)
- Macchial Lake (850 m)
- Mahakali Lake (4080 m)
- Manimahesh Lake (4080 m)
- Nako Lake (3662 m)
- Pong Dam Lake
- Prashar Lake (2730 m)
- Renuka Lake (672 m)
- Rewalsar Lake
- Suraj Tal (4883 m)

== Jammu and Kashmir ==
- Anchar Lake
- Brari Nambal
- Dal Lake
- Gadsar Lake
- Gangabal Lake
- Gil Sar
- Hokersar
- Kausar Nag
- Khanpursar
- Khushal Sar
- Manasbal Lake
- Mansar Lake
- Marsar Lake
- Nandan Sar Lake
- Sheshnag Lake
- Satsar Lake
- Tarsar Lake
- Tulian lake
- Vishansar Lake
- Wular Lake
- Nigeen Lake
- Nilnag Lake
- Nundkol Lake
- Krishansar Lake

== Jharkhand ==
- Ranchi Lake
- Dimna Lake

== Ladakh ==
- Tso Moriri
- Tso Kar
- Pangong Tso
- Kyagar Tso

== Lakshadweep ==
- Lagoons of Lakshadweep

== Karnataka ==
- Lakes in Bangalore
  - Mamadapur Badshah Lake
  - Bellandur Lake
  - Hebbal Lake
  - Jaraganahalli Lake
  - Lalbagh Lake
  - Madiwala Lake
  - Puttenahalli Lake (JP Nagar)
  - Puttenahalli Lake (Yelahanka)
  - sarakki lake
  - Ulsoor Lake
  - Varthur Lake
  - Yelahanka lake
- Mysore City lakes
  - Karanji lake
  - Kukkarahalli lake
  - Lingambudhi Lake
- Lakes in Davanagere District
  - Sulekere
  - Kundavada Kere
- Honnamana Kere
- Pampa Sarovar

== Kerala ==
- Ashtamudi Lake
- Kuttanad Lake
- Maanaanchira, Kozhikode
- Padinjarechira, Thrissur city
- Paravur Kayal
- Shasthamkotta lake
- Vadakkechira, Thrissur city
- Vanchikulam, Thrissur
- Vellayani Lake
- Vembanad Lake, longest lake of India
- Veli Lake

== Madhya Pradesh ==
- Bhojtal
- Lower Lake, Bhopal
- Tawa Reservoir
- Sagar Lake (Lakha Banjara Lake)

== Maharashtra ==
- Gorewada Lake
- Khindsi Lake
- Lonar Lake
- Pashan Lake
- Powai Lake
- Rankala Lake
- Salim Ali Lake
- Shivasagar lake
- Talao Pali
- Futala Lake
- Tansa Lake
- Tulsi Lake
- Upvan Lake
- Vaitarna Lake
- Venna Lake
- Vihar Lake
- Chatri Lake
- Meherun Lake
- Mastani Lake

== Manipur ==
- Loktak Lake
- Pumlenpat
- Ikop Pat
- Loukoipat
- Yaralpat
- Laphupat
- Shilempat
- Thangapat
- Sangaipat
- Akampat
- Keisampat (Extinct)
- Porompat (Extinct)
- Zaimeng Lake
- Zeilad Lake

== Meghalaya ==
- Umiam Lake

== Mizoram ==
- Palak Dïl
- Tam Dil

== Nagaland ==
- Lake Shilloi
- Loho Lake

== Odisha ==
- Victoria Sagar Lake
- Anshupa Lake
- Chilka Lake (largest salt water Lake in india)
- Kanjia Lake

== Puducherry ==
- Bahour Lake
- Ousteri Lake
- Velrampet Lake
- Nallambal Lake

== Punjab ==
- Harike Wetland
- Kanjli Wetland
- Ropar Wetland

== Rajasthan ==
- Balsamand lake
- Dhebar Lake / Jaisamand Lake
- Jal Mahal,
- Kaylana Lake, Jodhpur
- Loonkaransar
- Nakki Lake
- Pachpadra Lake
- Pushkar Lake, Pushkar
- Rajsamand Lake
- Ramgarh Lake
- Sambhar Salt Lake
- Talwara Lake
- Ummed Sagar Bandh
- Siliserh Lake

=== Ajmer ===
- Ana Sagar Lake
- Lake Foy Sagar

=== Udaipur ===
- Fateh Sagar Lake
- Pichola lake
- Lake Badi
- Swaroop Sagar Lake
- Udaisagar Lake
- Govardhan Sagar Lake

== Sikkim ==
- Gurudongmar Lake, highest lake of India
- Khecheopalri Lake
- Lake Cholamu
- Lake Tsongmo
- Samiti Lake
- South Lhonak Lake

== Tamil Nadu ==
- Adambakkam Lake
- Coimbatore
  - Singanallur Lake
  - Ukkadam Lake Periyakulam Lake
- Berijam Lake
- Chembarambakkam Lake
- Kaliveli Lake
- Kodaikanal Lake
- Ooty Lake
- Perumal Eri
- Red Hills Lake
- Sholavaram Lake
- Veeranam Lake
- Maduranthakam Lake
- Tandi Lake

== Telangana ==
- Bhadrakali Lake
- Durgam Cheruvu
- Himayat Sagar
- Hussain Sagar
- Laknavaram Lake
- Mir Alam Tank
- Osman Sagar
- Pakhal Lake
- Saroornagar Lake
- Shamirpet Lake
- Waddepally Lake
- Ramappa lake
- Gangaram Cheruvu
- Ameenpur Lake
- Fox Sagar Lake
- Gandigudem Cheruvu

== Tripura ==
- Bijoy sagar
- Kamalasagar
- Rudrasagar Lake

== Uttar Pradesh ==
- Gobind Vallabh Pant Sagar, largest man–made lake of India
- Barua Sagar Tal
- Belasagar Lake
- Keetham Lake
- Ramgarh Tal Lake
- Bakhira Tal Lake
- Sarsai Jheel
- Moti Jheel
- Sheetal Jheel
- Surha Tal
- Phulhar Lake

== Uttarakhand ==
| Name | District | Type | Size km^{2} | Quality | Notes |
|---|---|---|---|---|---|
| Tehri Lake | Tehri Garhwal | Man-made | 52 | Freshwater | Created by Tehri Dam, in New Tehri |
| Bhimtal Lake | Nainital district | Man-made | .48 | Freshwater | Created from masonry dam in Nainital Distt |
| Nainital Lake | Nainital district | Natural | .48 | Freshwater | Kidney shaped natural freshwater lake in Nainital |
| Roopkund Lake | Chamoli | Natural | 0.0015 | Freshwater | High altitude glacial lake in Chamoli. Also called Skeleton Lake. |
| Deoria Tal | Rudraprayag | Natural | | Freshwater | Known for its wide 300° panorama |
| Suryadhar Lake | Dehradun district | Man-made | .55 | Freshwater | Freshwater lake in Nainital Dehradun dist |
| Kedar Tal | | Natural | | Freshwater | |

== West Bengal ==
- East Calcutta Wetlands
- Jore Pokhri
- Mirik Lake
- Rabindra Sarobar
- Rasikbil
- Santragachhi Lake
- Senchal Lake
- Subhas Sarobar

== See also ==
- List of lakes
- Soda lake
- Water resources in India
