= Telibandha Lake =

Lake in India

- Marine Drive तेलीबांधा तालाब मरीन ड्राइव
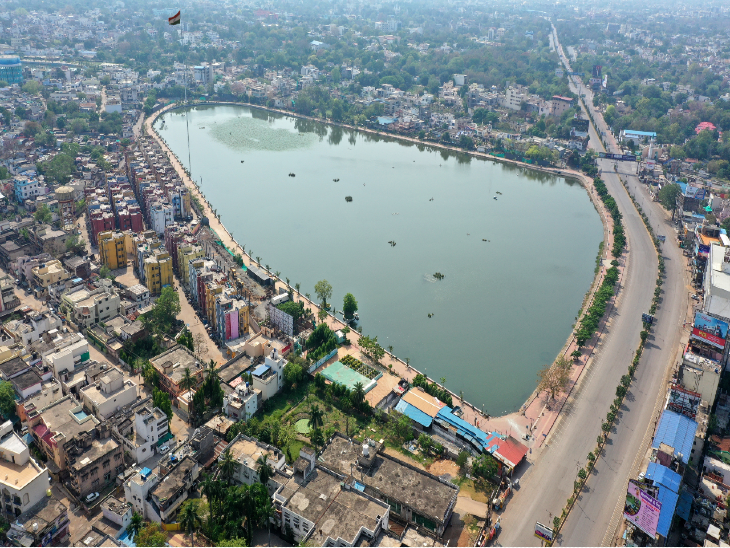
- Aerial View of MD during COVID-19 pandemic in Raipur
- Interactive map of Telibandha Lake
- Location: Telibandha, Raipur, Chhattisgarh, India
- Coordinates: 21.239°N 81.659°E
- Type: Freshwater lake
- Built: 1835
- Max. length: 0.3 km (0.19 mi)
- Surface area: 28 km^{2} (11 sq mi)
- Settlements: Raipur

Telibandha Lake or Marine Drive or popularly by its initials MD is a freshwater lake located at Raipur, Chhattisgarh, India. It is located in Telibandha area of the city along the Gaurav Path.

== History ==
Telibandha Lake was built by the Malgujars of Raipur in 1835 in a small village called 'Telibandha'. After the creation of the lake, the lake was named as 'Telibandha Lake' which was named after the village. Later on after the urbanization, it was called 'Marine Drive'.

== Tourism ==
Telibandha Lake is also a famous tourist attraction for entertainment and tourism. It has a parking, selfie point, street food market, a national flag pole and a lush green garden. It is also famous for its musical fountain and various events.

== See also ==
- Vivekananda Sarovar, Raipur
- List of lakes of India
