= Velrampet Lake =

Lake in Puducherry, India

- French: Lac Velrampet
- Location within India
- Location: Puducherry, India
- Coordinates: 11.9111°N 79.7982°E
- Type: lake

Velrampet Lake (French: Lac Velrampet) is a lake in the union territory of Puducherry, India. The lake is the a major waterbody near Mudaliarpet.

== Geography ==
The lake is spread over 165-acre, which is one of the few major surviving waterbodies in Puducherry. This lake was the major source of groundwater for the neighboring areas of Mudaliarpet and Komabakkam.

Until October 2016, the condition of this lake was very poor. This lake was open to excretion, dumping of plastic and illegal fishing which leads to increase in amount of garbage day by day.

Things started to change for the better, upon the appointment of the Lieutenant Governor, Kiran Bedi along with team Raj Nivas. She motivated the public of Pondicherry to take ownership for the betterment of the lake. By her ambition, the public seemed to have been moved into action. Due to the efforts of various environmental groups and the collective efforts of local public, the lake has been purged of all its plastic. After that, the lake has been declared as eco-tourism park.

== Bird Sanctuary ==
Around the lake, a fence has been raised. Various types of species of local plants were planted around the lake like as Bougainvillea, Peltophorum, Cassia Tora, Pongamia, Anthocephalus Cadamba with the assistance of volunteers to attract more migratory birds. has made a small boat club in the lake for tourists.

== Tourism ==
The lake is one of the prominent tourist spot in Puducherry. The Puducherry Tourism Department Corporation has made a small boat club in the lake for tourists.

== See also ==
- List of Lakes of India
