= Goverdhan Sagar Lake =

- Location within Rajasthan Location within India
- Location: Udaipur, Rajasthan
- Coordinates: 24.53763°N 73.68365°E
- Type: reservoir, fresh water
- Basin countries: India
- Built: 1565
- Surface area: 3.75 km (2.33 mi)
- Average depth: 9 m (30 ft)
- Max. depth: 9 m (30 ft)
- Settlements: Udaipur
- References: http://www.udaipur.org.uk/lakes/udai-sagar-lake.html

Gowardhan Sagar Lake is another prominent lake in the city of lakes, Udaipur. It is the smallest artificial lake of Udaipur. The lake is situated around 2.5 km from the south-west of Udaipur.

== Geography ==
Gowardhan Sagar Lake is 9 meters in depth and covers an area of 3750m. The Lake receives its water from Lake Pichola. It has been recorded that the reservoir has a fairly rich in fish and 32 species representing almost 9 families. The species, which are found very less are need to be conserve.

== Lake restoration works ==
The National Lake Conservation Program took 4 lakes of Udaipur under them. Goverdhan Sagar Lake was one of those lakes.

The key undertakings in the program includes:

- Curbing pollution in the lakes
- Restrictions on mining activities in the catchment areas
- Conservation of wildlife around the lakes
- Restrictions on disposal of waste products and sewerage in the lakes

== See also ==
- List of dams and reservoirs in India
- List of lakes in India
- Udaipur
- Tourist Attractions in Udaipur
