= Balsamand Lake =

- Location within Rajasthan
- Location: Rajasthan
- Coordinates: 26.331°N 73.020°E
- Type: Reservoir
- Basin countries: India
- Max. length: 1 km (0.62 mi)

Balsamand Lake is a lake situated 5 kilometres (3.1 mi) from Jodhpur on Jodhpur-Mandore Road. This lake is a popular picnic spot, by Balak Rao Pratihar in 1159 AD who belongs to the kshatriya community. It was designed as a water reservoir to provide water to Mandore. The lake has a length of one kilometre (0.62 mi), breadth of 50 metres (160 ft) and a depth of 15 metres (49 ft).

== Balsamand Lake Palace ==
The Balsamand Lake Palace was built later as a summer palace on its shore. The lake is surrounded by lush green gardens that house groves of trees like mango, papaya, pomegranate, guava and plum. Animals and birds like the jackal and peacock also call this place home.

== See also ==
- List of lakes in India
