= Ranchi Lake =

Freshwater lake in India

- Ranchi Talab; Bada Talab
- Interactive map of Ranchi Lake
- Location: Ranchi, Jharkhand, India
- Coordinates: 23.367°N 85.317°E
- Type: Freshwater lake
- Built: 1842
- Max. length: 0.4 km (0.25 mi)
- Surface area: 28 km^{2} (11 sq mi)

Ranchi Lake, popularly known as Ranchi Talab or Bada Talab, is a freshwater lake in Ranchi, Jharkhand, India. It is situated at the base of Ranchi Hill and spans over 53 acres. It has a 33-feet statue of Swami Vivekananda.

== History ==
The lake was created in 1842 by a British agent, Colonel Onsely. Constructed during the colonial period, the lake was a vital source of water supply for the city, reflecting the strategic urban planning of the time. Over the years, however, the purpose of Ranchi Lake has transcended mere utility; it has metamorphosed into a cultural and recreational focal point for the city.

== Geography ==
Ranchi Lake is strategically positioned at the base of Ranchi Hill, providing a breathtaking backdrop to the shimmering waters. The geographical setting, surrounded by hills and greenery, adds to the overall aesthetic appeal of the lake. The vast expanse of water reflects the skies above, creating a mesmerizing play of colors during sunrise and sunset.

== See also ==
- List of lakes of India
- Pahari Mandir
- Ranchi
