= Siliserh Lake =

Lake in Rajasthan

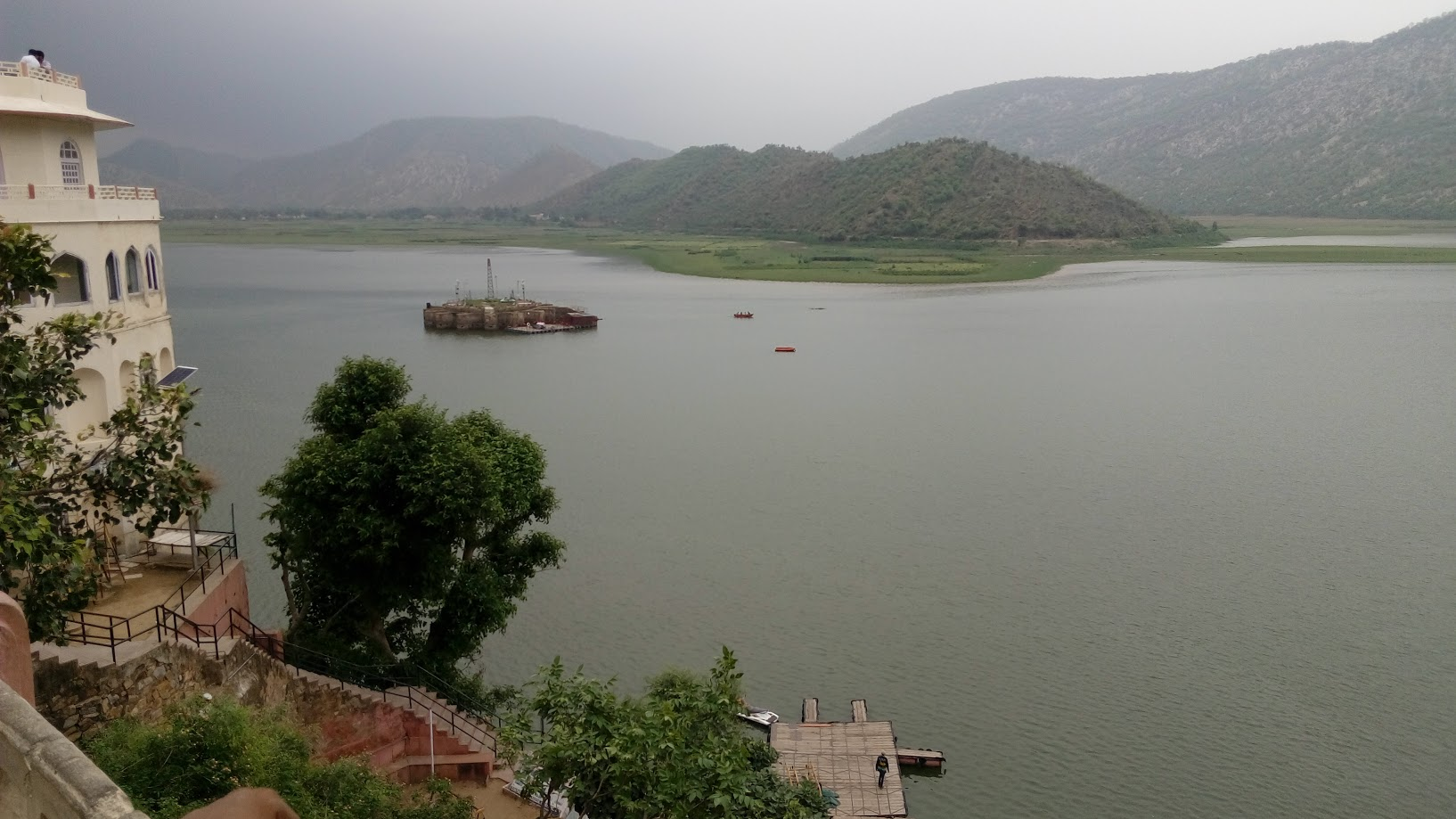

- Location within Rajasthan
- Interactive map of Siliserh Lake
- Location: Alwar, Rajasthan
- Coordinates: 27°31′45″N 76°31′43″E
- Basin countries: India
- Max. depth: 32 ft (9.8 m)

Ramsar Wetland
- Designated: 12 December 2025
- Reference no.: 2581

Siliserh Lake is an artificial lake situated eight miles southwest of Alwar. It covers an area of about 7km^{2} (Note: Up to 10 square km with good monsoon) and is flanked by dense woodland and cenotaphs on its embankment.

== History ==
The lake was built in 1845 by Maharaja Vinay Singh, the then-ruler of Alwar, by constructing an embankment on a tributary of the Ruparel River. The purpose of creating the lake was to provide water to Alwar, evidenced by the aqueducts that surround the lake. The lake is flanked by its namesake, a palace which was built by the king for his wife. The palace has since been converted to the RTDC hotel. A boating facility is available nearby.

== See also ==
- List of lakes of India
