= Ummed Sagar Bandh =

Ummed Sagar Bandh is a dam near Jodhpur in Rajasthan, India. It is located near Kaylana Lake. The dam supplies water to Jodhpur.

It was built during the reign of Maharaja Ummed Singh. It was finished in 1933.

== List of lakes in India ==
- List of lakes in India
