= Varun Sagar Lake =

Lake Varun Sagar
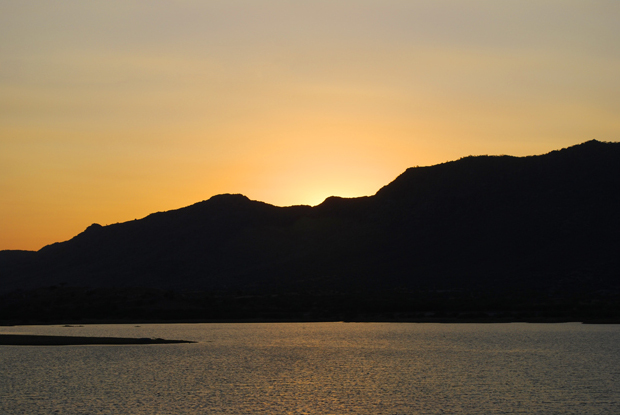
- Lake Varun Sagar on a sunny evening

- Location within Rajasthan Location within India
- Location: Rajasthan, India
- Coordinates: 26°27′N 74°35′E
- Type: Artificial lake

Varun Sagar Lake (previously known as: Foy Sagar Lake), is an artificial lake situated in Ajmer district in the state of Rajasthan, India.

== History ==
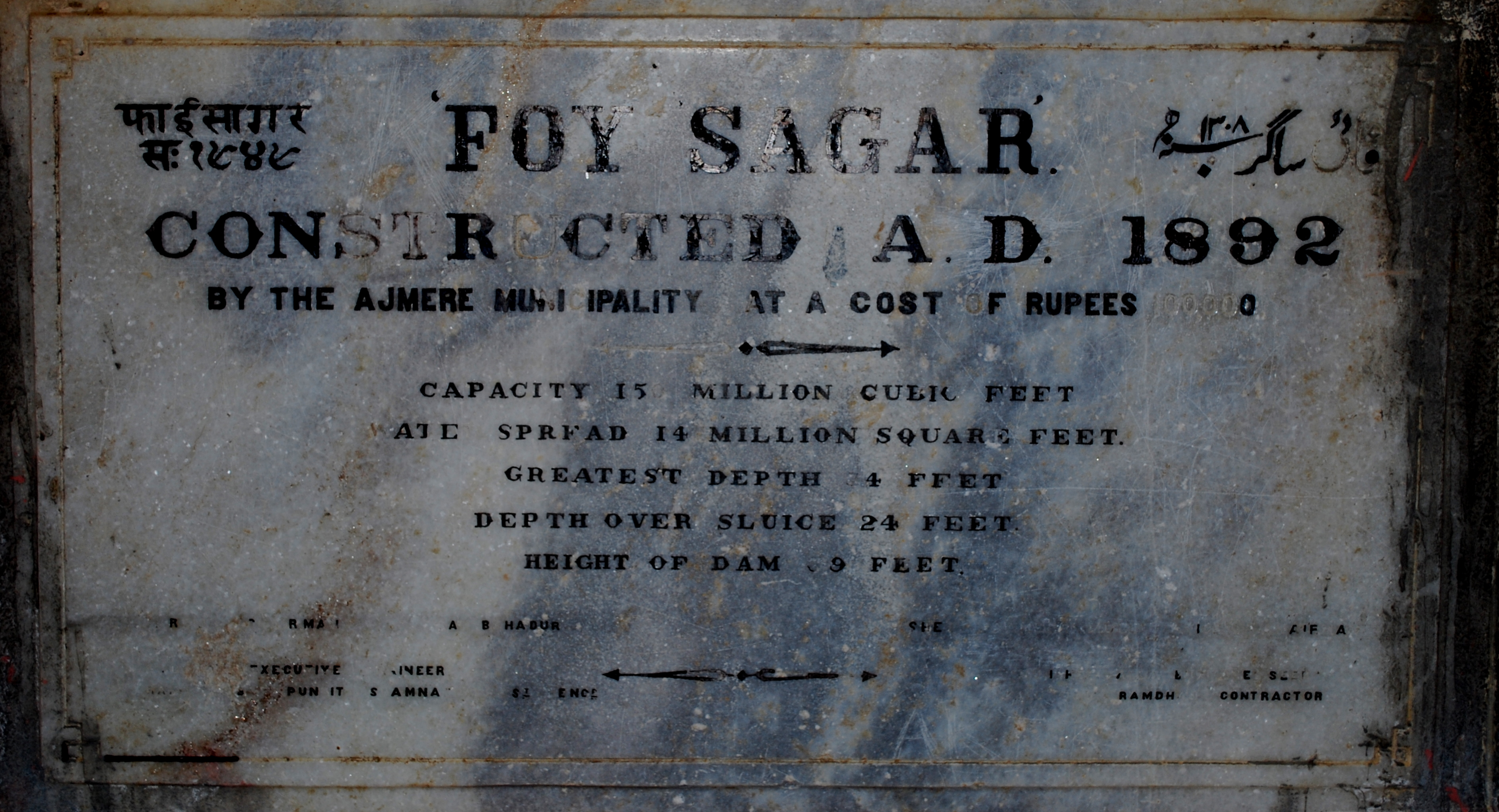
Inscription installed at Lake Foy Sagar

It was earlier named after the engineer Mr. Foy, an englishman, who created it under a famine relief project in 1892. He created it to tackle with harshest conditions of famine under a famine relief project. It appears flat, and offers views of the neighboring Aravalli mountains. The lake is among the tourist spots of the city.

At the time when the lake was constructed, the city of Ajmer was known as Ajaymeru, as can be noticed from the inscription installed at the lake. Its original capacity is 15 million cubic feet, and the water is spread over 14,000,000 square feet (1,300,000 m^{2}).

== Later developments ==
On 12 February 2025, Mr. Vasudev Devnani, Speaker of the Rajasthan Legislative Assembly and MLA from Ajmer North, renamed the lake to Varun Sagar.

== See also ==
- List of lakes in India
- List of dams and reservoirs in India
