= Lakhota Lake =

- Location in Gujarat

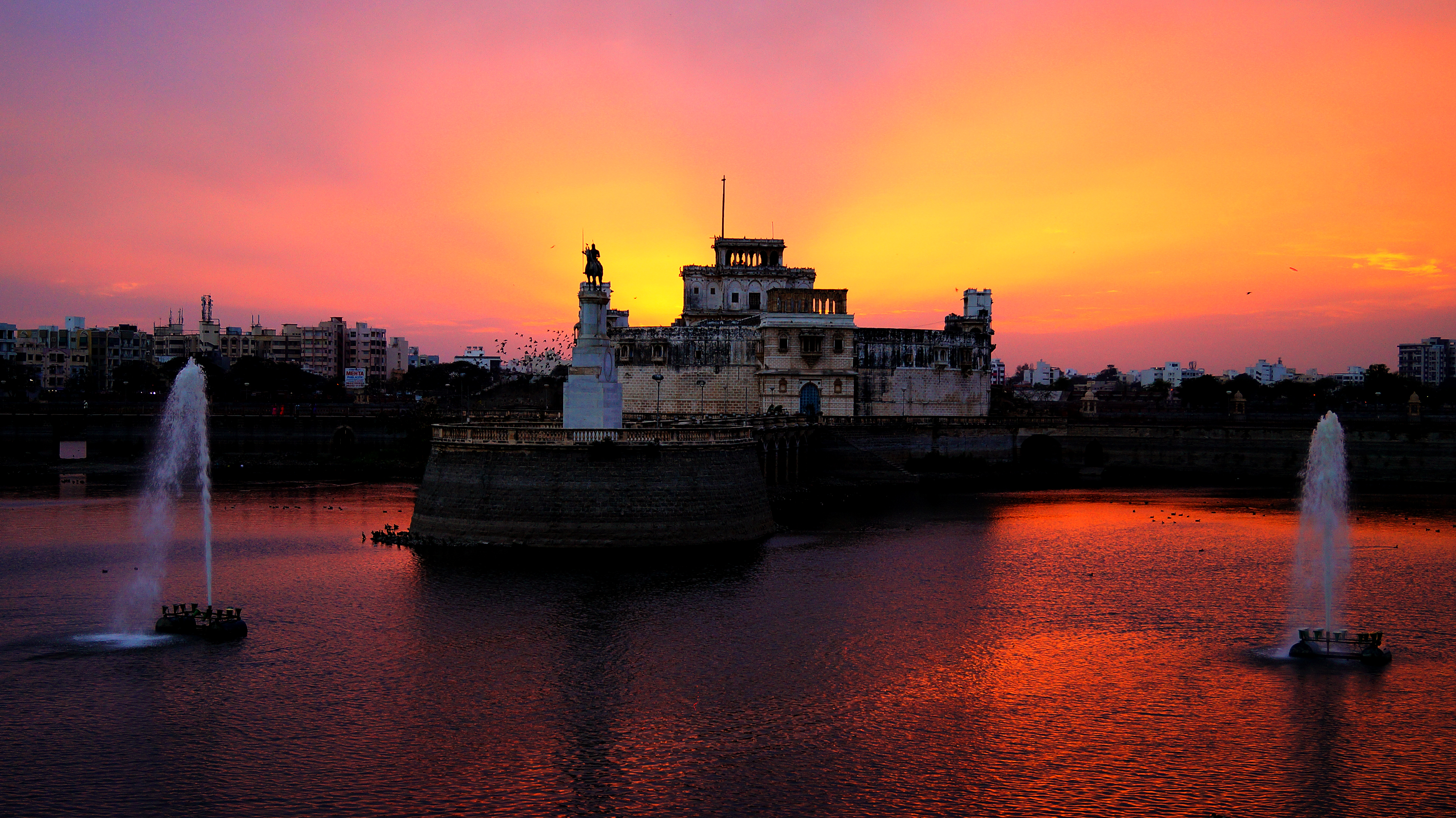
- Lakhota Lake
- Location: Jamnagar, Gujarat
- Coordinates: 22.4656°N 70.0645°E
- Lake type: Artificial lake
- Basin countries: India
- Settlements: Jamnagar

Lakhota Lake is a man-made lake situated in centre of Jamnagar in the Indian state of Gujarat. The lake is popularly known as Lakhota Talav or Ranmal Lake. Lakhota Fort is located on a small island in the lake. The lake is located 5 km from Jamnagar Railway Station. It is one of the largest water bodies in Jamnagar city and also among the prime places to visit in Jamnagar.

== History ==
In the 18th century Lakhota Fort and Lakhota Lake were both built by King Jam Ranmal. The lake is known for being a recreational hub and a tourist spot. It is home to many rare species, including 75 different kinds of birds.

== See also ==
- Lists of Lakes in India
