= Samiti Lake =

- समिति लेक (Sikkimese)
- Location within Sikkim
- Coordinates: 27.561562°N 88.187328°E
- Type: Freshwater Lake
- Basin countries: India
- Surface elevation: 4,200 metres (13,800 ft)

Samiti Lake (Sikkimese language: समिति लेक: Bunmoten Choo) is an alpine glacial lake located in the West Sikkim District of the Sikkim, India. The lake sits at the bottom of Onglakthang Valley, which is located in close proximity to the base of the mountain Pandim and Kangchenjunga and by extension is located in the Himalaya mountain range.

== Description ==
Samiti Lake is locally known as Bunmoten Choo by the local residents in the Sikkimese language. It is considered sacred by the local residents.

The lake sits at a high elevation of 4,200 to 4,300 meters (13,700 feet). At its widest point during maximum saturation, the lake has a width of 230 meters.

During the spring and early summer seasons, nearby resident farmers and herders bring their sheep and cattle, especially during the summer months, to allow grazing on the shore and drink from the lake.

Boulders and rocks are calcareous and host plenty of moss. Perennials plants grow around the lake during the spring. Rhododendron forests thrive on the shores and bloom yearly during the spring. The lake attracts visitors with emerald-green turquoise and transparent colours. During the winter, the lake freezes over, melting away for flora blooms during the spring. It is a sacred source of water for the Prek River by the locals, receiving the water from the melting of snow from the mountains.

Samiti Lake is a popular stopping point on the route to the popular Goechala Pass for long distance hikers, and is considered attractive for photography and camping. The lake is a scenic place that takes a minimum of two hours to reach along the Dzongri Trail. The lake is 22 kilometers from the nearest populated place Yuksom to the south and is close to the border of Nepal to the west and China to the north.
