= Mayem Lake =

Calm Scenic lake with boating activities and Latest bungy jumping by jumin heights

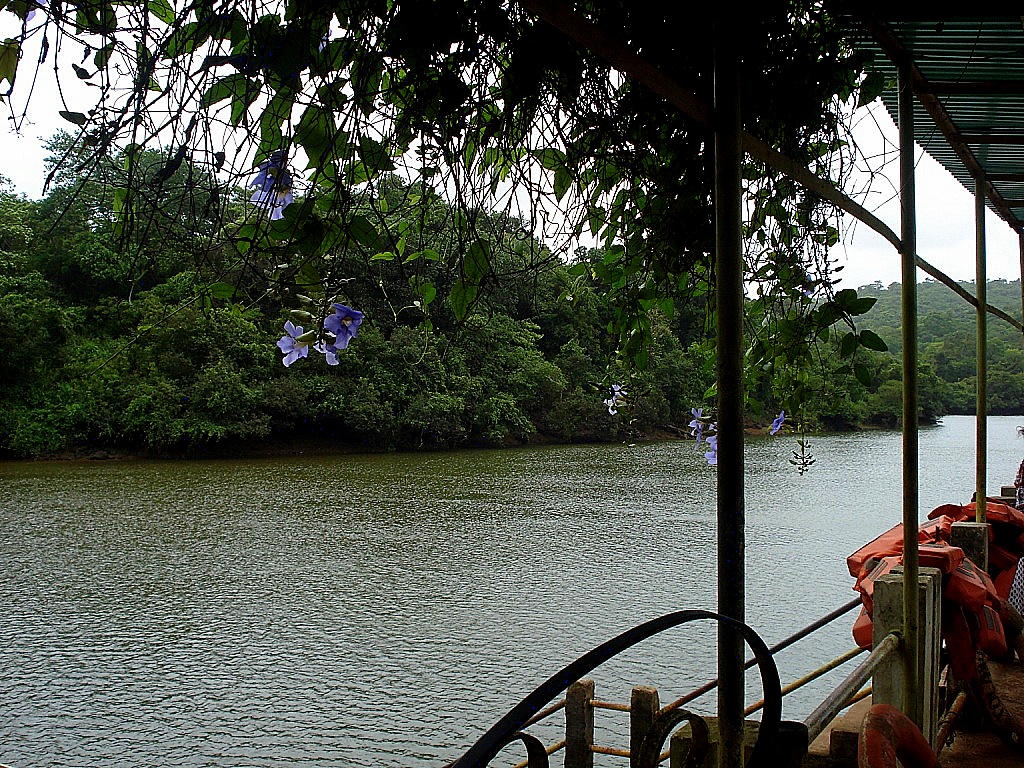
- Mayem Lake, Goa

- Location within India
- Location: Bicholim taluka, Goa, India
- Coordinates: 15°34′32.27″N 73°56′21.66″E
- Basin countries: India
- Settlements: Bicholim taluka

Mayem Lake is a freshwater lake located on the Indian state of Goa. It is situated in Bicholim taluka close to east of Mapusa town.

== Geography ==
Mayem lake is in the Bicholim taluka of Goa. It is surrounded by villages, hills, the lake and verdant greens. Many avian species can be found near the lake.
