= Mehrun Lake =

Coordinates: 20.980°N 75.565°E

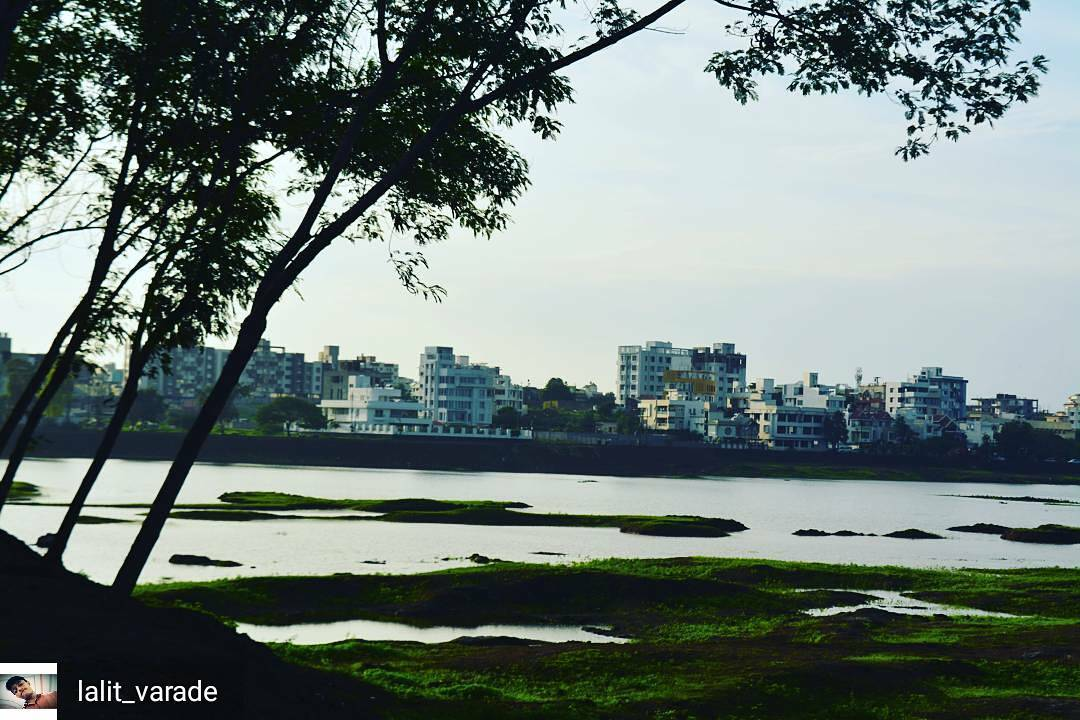
Mehrun lake

Mehrun Lake is a natural lake situated near Jalgaon, Maharashtra, India. The lake is a hangout place for jalgaonkars. There are many parks near the lake which attract people. The place is religious for migrants in the city from Uttar Pradesh and Bihar who practice Chhatt Puja at the lake. The Mehrun Bor is a famous fruit in the Jalgaon district.

The municipal corporation of Jalgaon is planning to build a lord Ganesh Temple and renovate the lake to boost tourism.
