= Vivekananda Sarovar, Raipur =

Freshwater Lake in Budhapara, Raipur

Vivekananda Sarovar
- Swami Vivekananda Sarovar; Budha Talab स्वामी विवेकानंद सरोवर बूढ़ा तालाब
- Interactive map of Vivekananda Sarovar
- Location: Budhapara, Raipur, Chhattisgarh, India
- Coordinates: 21.232°N 81.633°E
- Type: Freshwater Lake
- Etymology: Swami Vivekananda
- Built: 1897
- Max. length: 0.3 km (0.19 mi)
- Surface area: 30 km^{2} (12 sq mi)
- Settlements: Raipur

Vivekananda Sarovar, popularly called Swami Vivekananda Sarovar or Budha Talab, is a lake in Raipur, the capital city of Chhattisgarh, India. It is located in Budhapara area near the Balbir Singh Juneja Indoor Stadium and it is spread in 30 hectares.

== History ==
The lake is named after the Indian philosopher and thinker, Swami Vivekananda who visited Raipur in 1897. According to popular belief, he bathed at this lake for two years.

== Tourism ==
The Budha Talab is also known as one of the best picnic spots in the city. It is the best place for entertainment and tourism. It has a kids play area and an open gym.

== See also ==
- List of lakes of India
- Tourism in Chhattisgarh
