= Veli Lake =

Freshwater lake in Kerala, India

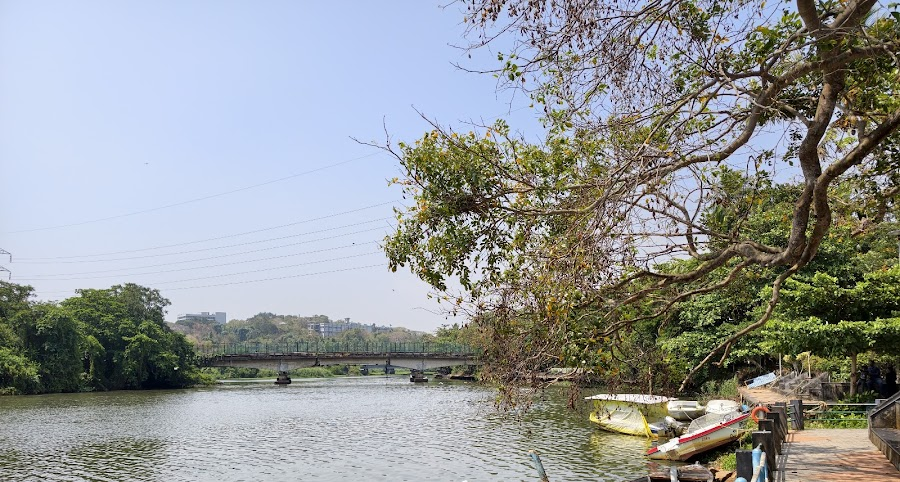
- Veli Lake view from Tourist Village

- Location within Kerala
- Location: Thiruvananthapuram district, Kerala
- Coordinates: 8°30′35.14″N 76°53′17.85″E
- Basin countries: India
- Average depth: 3.0 m (9.8 ft)
- Settlements: Thiruvananthapuram

Veli Lake or Veli Kayal is a freshwater lake in the state of Kerala and is situated in Thiruvananthapuram, Kerala, India. lake is 8 km from Kerala's capital city, Thiruvananthapuram.

On the eastern side, Veli Lake is connected to the Arabian Sea.

== Location ==
The lake is situated 8 km north west of Thiruvananthapuram City. ISRO's space research organization, Vikram Sarabhai Space Centre, is situated near by the lake.
