= Suryadhar Lake =

- सूर्यधार झील (Hindi)
- Location within Uttarakhand
- Location: Doiwala, Uttarakhand, India
- Coordinates: 30°15′3.38″N 78°15′23.38″E
- Type: artificial lake
- Basin countries: India
- Max. length: 28 metres (92 ft)
- Max. width: .55 km (0.34 mi)
- Surface area: 55 hectares (140 acres)
- Average depth: 10 m (33 ft)
- Settlements: Doiwala

Suryadhar Lake, is an artificial lake developed by Government of Uttarakhand, situated in Doiwala, in Uttarakhand.

== Overview ==
The lake has a holding capacity of 77 thousand cubic meters of water. The length of this lake is 550 meters, the width is 28 meters, and the depth is 10 meters. 18 villages rely on irrigation, and 19 villages receive drinking water from this lake.

== History ==
Chief Minister Trivendra Singh Rawat laid the foundation stone on 25 December 2017. The construction work of Suryadhar Lake was completed in November 2020.
