= Vanchikulam =

Lake in Kerala, India

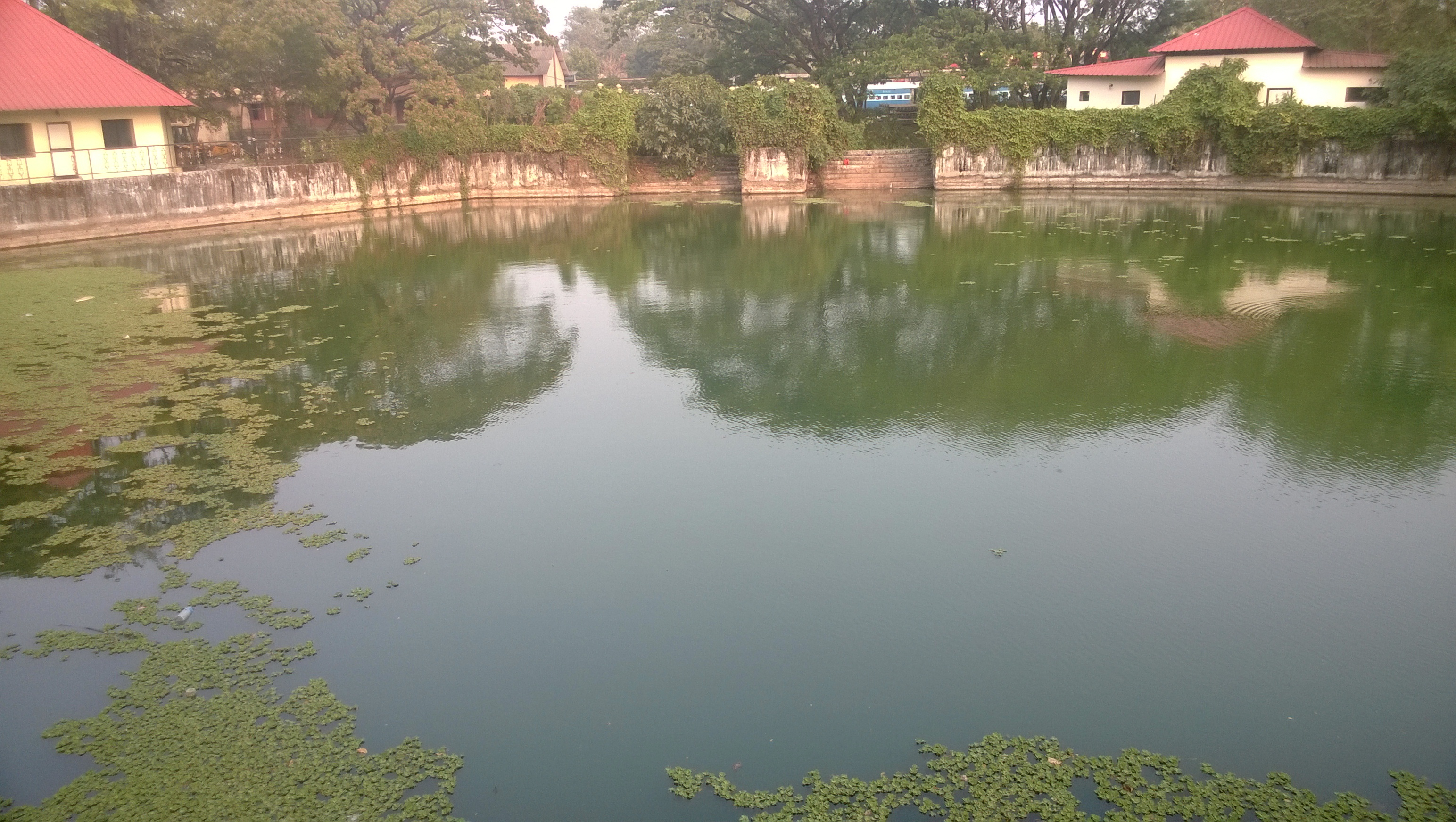

- Location within Kerala Location within India
- Location: Thrissur, Kerala
- Coordinates: 10°30′50″N 76°12′22″E
- Primary outflows: Thrissur Kole Wetlands
- Basin countries: India

Vanchikulam (Malayalam: വഞ്ചികുളം) is a freshwater lake in Thrissur city in the Kerala state of India. The pond was a water way connecting Thrissur to Kochi in older days.

== History ==
In older days, Vanchikulam was linked with canals and backwaters of Thrissur District and Ernakulam District. It was a big trading hub where goods and people were transported to different parts of the state like Kochi and Alappuzha and to the nearby ports. After the advent of Shoranur–Cochin Harbour section railway line, the backwaters lost the glory. Vanchikulam used to house warehouses in older days.
