= Nandan Sar Lake =

Lake in Jammu and Kashmir, India

- Location within Jammu and Kashmir Location within India
- Location: Poonch district, Jammu and Kashmir
- Coordinates: 33°33′32″N 74°31′33″E
- Type: alpine lake
- Basin countries: India

The Nandan Sar Lake is an oval shaped alpine lake located, near Pir Panjal Pass. in the Pir Panjal Range in the Shopian district of Jammu and Kashmir, India.

== Geography ==
Nandan Sar Lake is located at an elevation of about 3500 meters. The lake is one of the biggest in the Poonch district with a maximum length of over 1 kilometer and is famous for its deep blue colour. The water of the lake runs from Jadi Marg Nullah and flows down into the Kashmir Valley.
