= Khajjiar Lake =

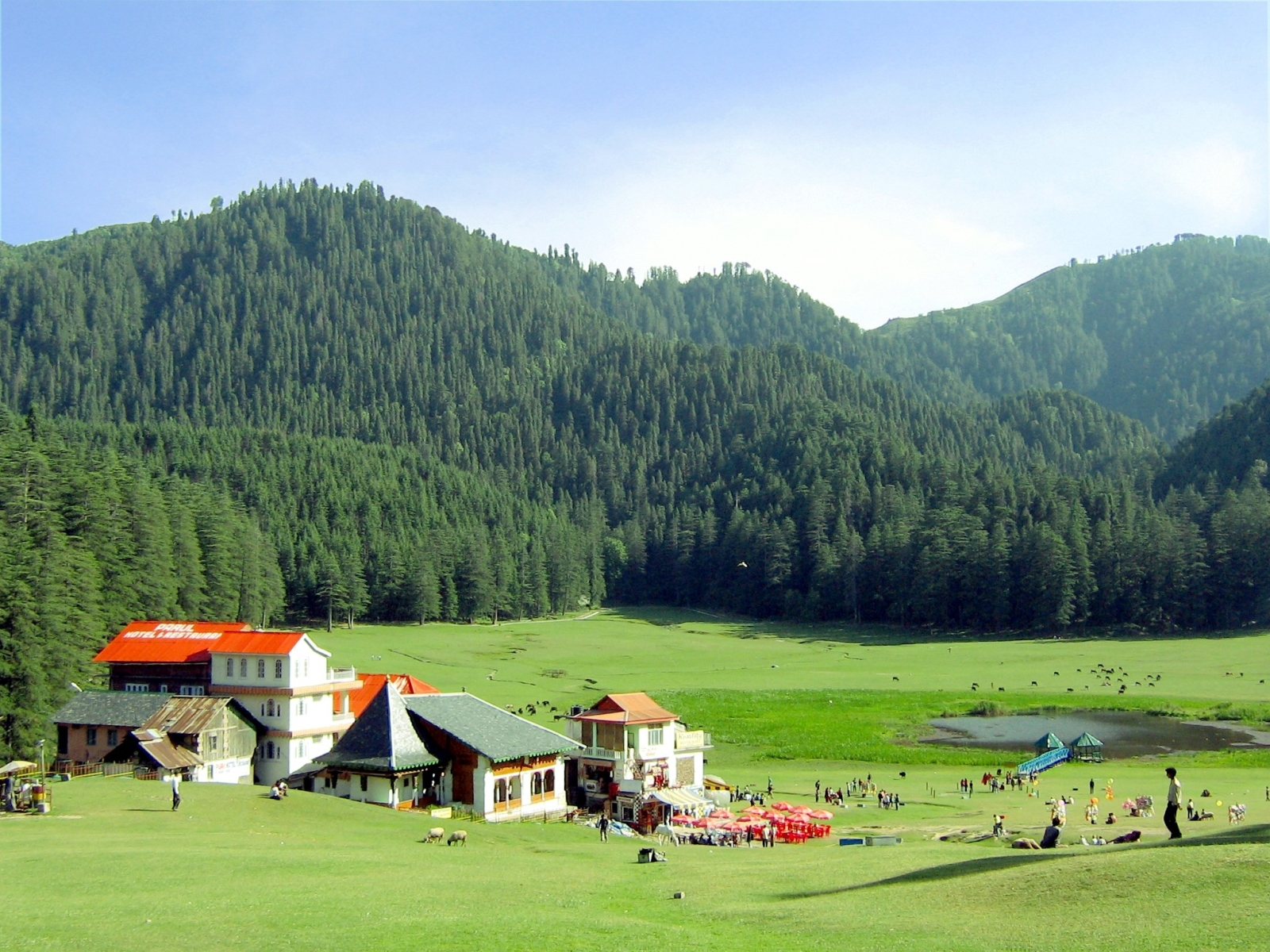

- Location within Himachal Pradesh
- Location: Chamba district
- Coordinates: 32°32′46″N 76°03′28″E
- Type: Mid altitude lake
- Basin countries: India
- Surface elevation: 1,900 m (6,200 ft)
- References: Himachal Pradesh Tourism Dep.

Khajjiar Lake is situated in Khajjiar, in Chamba district of Himachal Pradesh, India. It is situated at a height of around 1,951 m above sea level between Dalhousie and Chamba Town. The lake is set in a huge grassy landscape, with evergreen cedar trees surrounding it from all sides. The lake takes its name from Khajji Nag, the deity in the temple nearby. The lake has considerably shrunk over the years and is now almost on the verge of vanishing.

== Location ==
- Distance from Dalhousie:- 16 km.
- Distance from Chamba (main city):- 25 km.

The lake is considered a sacred place to the Khajjinags (after whom this place is named). Khajjiar has a thick forest cover around the Kalatope sanctuary.
