= Perumal Eri =

- Location within India
- Location: Cuddalore district, Tamil Nadu, India
- Coordinates: 11°34′N 79°41′E
- Type: lake

Perumal Eri is a major fresh water lake in the Cuddalore district of Tamil Nadu, India.

It is located almost 07 kilometres (4.3 mi) from Alapakkam, at latitude/longitude 11.56667°N 79.68333°E and it is the second largest lake of the Cuddalore district.

History: when Cuddalore was under the Madurai Nayakars domine Cuddalore (Perumal Nayakan Palayam) was a range among the five ranges of its capital Tiruchirappalli. (Udayar Palayam, Marungapuri, Ariyalur, Cuddalore). It is expected that the lake was excavated during the rule of Perumal Nayakar at his Palayam as a step towards rain water conservation management.

Irrigation: Perumal Eri's irrigation covers around 1,000 acres (400 ha) of agricultural land. Villages include Puduchatram, Alapakkam, Thirthanagiri, Thaanur, Samba Reddi Palayam, Aayi Thurai, Mettu Palayam, Pundiaan Kuppam, Kallaiyangkuppam, T. Kallaiyangkuppam, Kundiyamallur, and Aathi Narayanapuram. The overflow water is let through a water channel to the Sangolikuppam river.
