= Sivasagar Lake =

- Lake
- Location in Assam, India Sivasagar Lake (India)
- Coordinates: 26.9932°N 94.6334°E
- Country: India
- State: Assam
- District: Sivasagar

Government
  - Body: Sivasagar Municipal Board

Population (2011)
  - Total: 1,151,050

Languages
  - Official: Assamese
- Time zone: UTC+5:30 (IST)
- PIN: 785640
- Telephone code: 91-3772
- ISO 3166 code: IN-AS
- Vehicle registration: AS 04
- Nearest major city: Jorhat, Dibrugarh
- Website: www.sivasagar.nic.in

Sivasagar Lake (Borpukhuri ) is situated in the heart of the Sivasagar city (Pron: /ˈsɪvəˌsʌɡər/ or /ˈʃɪvəˌsʌɡər/). ("the ocean of Shiva"), headquarters of the Sivasagar district Assam, India. The town was named after the 200-year old Lake Sivasagar, which is considered a tourist attraction. This lake was built by Queen Ambika who was the wife of Ahom king Siva Singha. It lies about 360 kilometres (224 mi) northeast of Guwahati.

== History ==
The Sivasagar Lake is the second largest lake in Assam. It was built in the year of 1734. This is also known as Bhorpukhuri, the entire bank of the tank is of historic importance as it has three temples. Sivasagar Lake is taken account as an attraction for many devotees and attract tourists from the entire country .

This place is visited often by nature admirers, wildlife buffs, and history lovers tourist. One of the major attractions of Sivasagar is Sivasagar Lake, It is the attraction of this town. It covers an area of about 130 to 257 acres and is surrounded by deep earthen moats. There are three temples on the bank of the Sivasagar Lake, which are also referred to as a Dol in the Assamese language. These Dols are Vishnu Dol, Siva Dol, and Devi Dol.

=== Population History in Sivasagar District ===
Population changes
| Year | 1951 | 1991 | 2001 | 2011 |
| Population | 10.622 | 37,326 | 53,854 | 50,781 |

== Notable people ==
- Bhaskar Jyoti Mahanta, DGP of Assam police
- Shubhankar Baruah, Radio personality.
