= List of lakes of Himachal Pradesh =

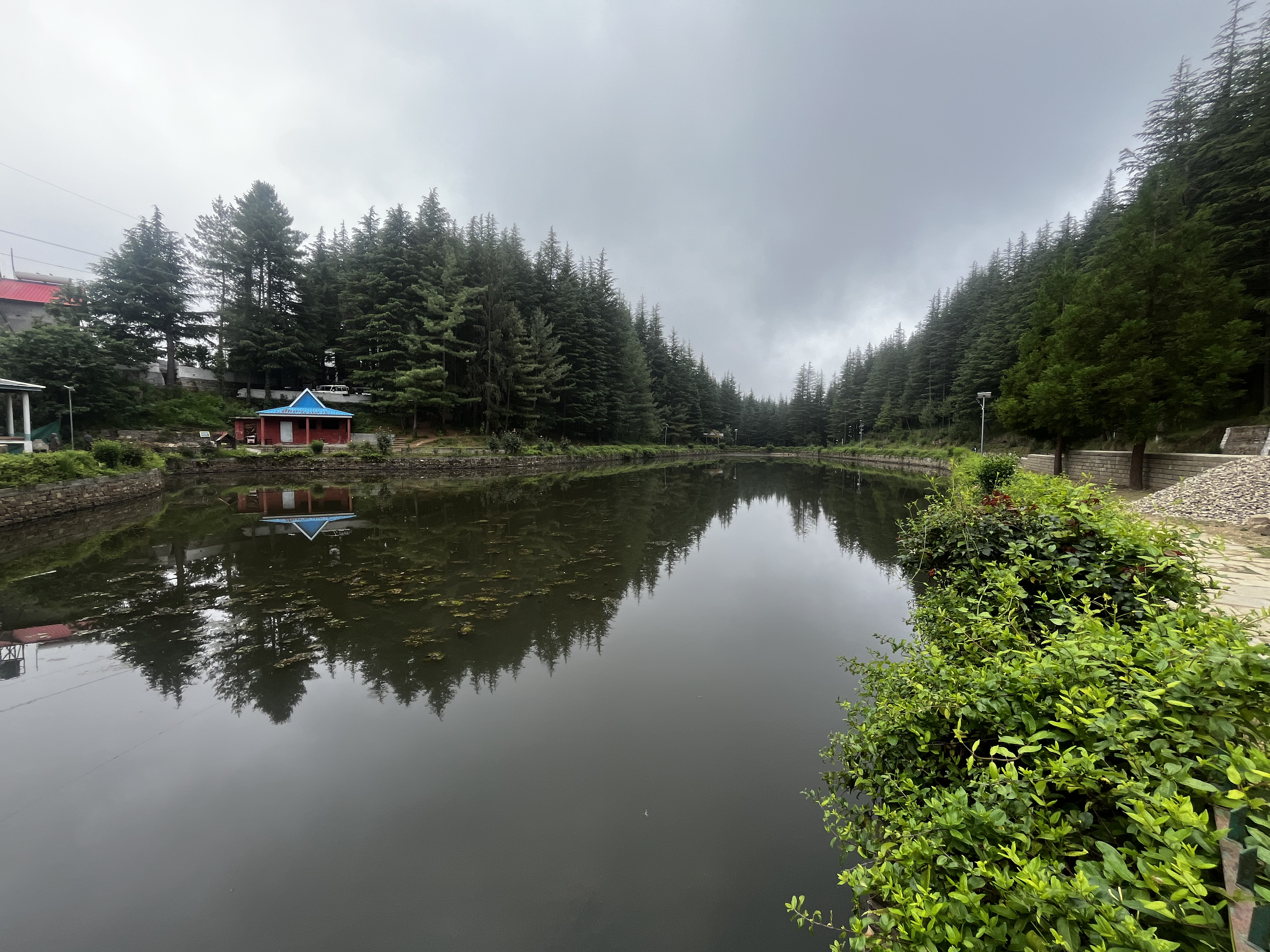
Tani Jubbar Lake, Kotgarh Shimla

== Reservoirs ==
- Maharana Pratap Sagar
- Pandoh Lake
- Gobind Sagar
- Chamera Dam

== Low Altitude Lakes ==
- Renuka Lake
- Macchial Lake

== Mid Altitude Lakes ==
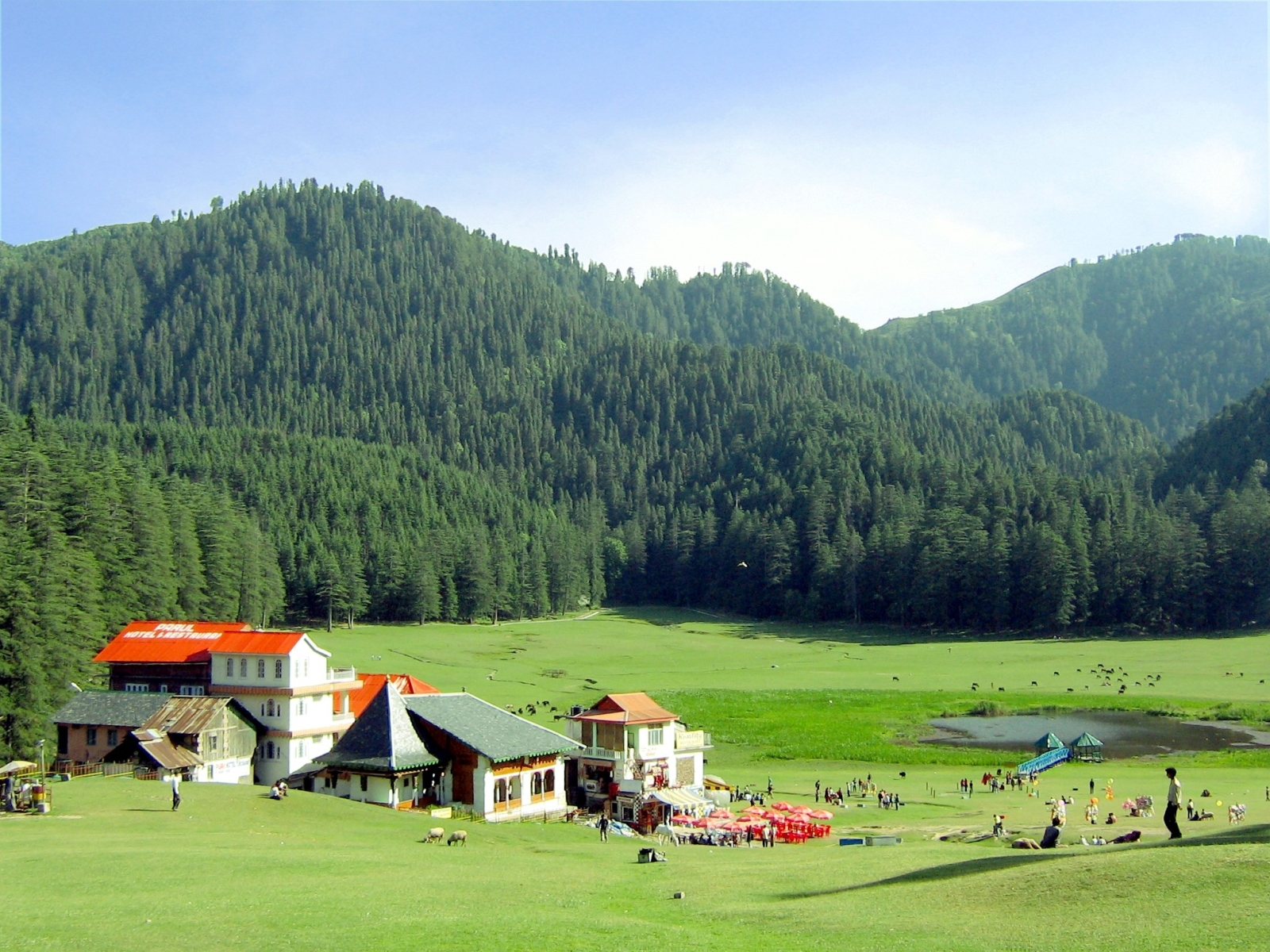
Khajjiar, Chamba

- Dal Lake District kangra
- Khajjiar Lake District Chamba
- Kumarwah Lake District Mandi
- Rewalsar Lake District mandi

== High Altitude Lakes ==
- Prashar Lake (2730m)- Mandi district
- Dehnasar Lake (4280m) -Kangra district
- Nako Lake (3662m) - Kinnaur district
- Chandra Tal (4300m) -Lahaul & Spiti district
- Suraj Tal (4883m) -Lahaul & Spiti district
- Dhankar Lake
- Dashair (4270m)
- Bhrighu Lake (4235m) - Kullu district
- Manimahesh Lake (4080m) -Chamba district
- Gadasru Lake (3470m) - Chamba district
- Mahakali Lake (4080m) -Chamba district
- Lama Dal (3960m) -Chamba district
- Chander Naun (4260m)
- Kareri Lake (2934m) -Kangra district
- Nag Dal Lake (4150m)
- Kamrunag lake (3334m) Mandi in district.mandi

In the Shimla area lie the small rain water fed lakes of Tani Jubbar, Kunihar and Karwali that lies of the Choti Shali Peak. There are several natural ponds in the area-one lies below New Shimla and there is another between Mashobra and Carignano.
