= Magars =

Ethnic group in Nepal and India

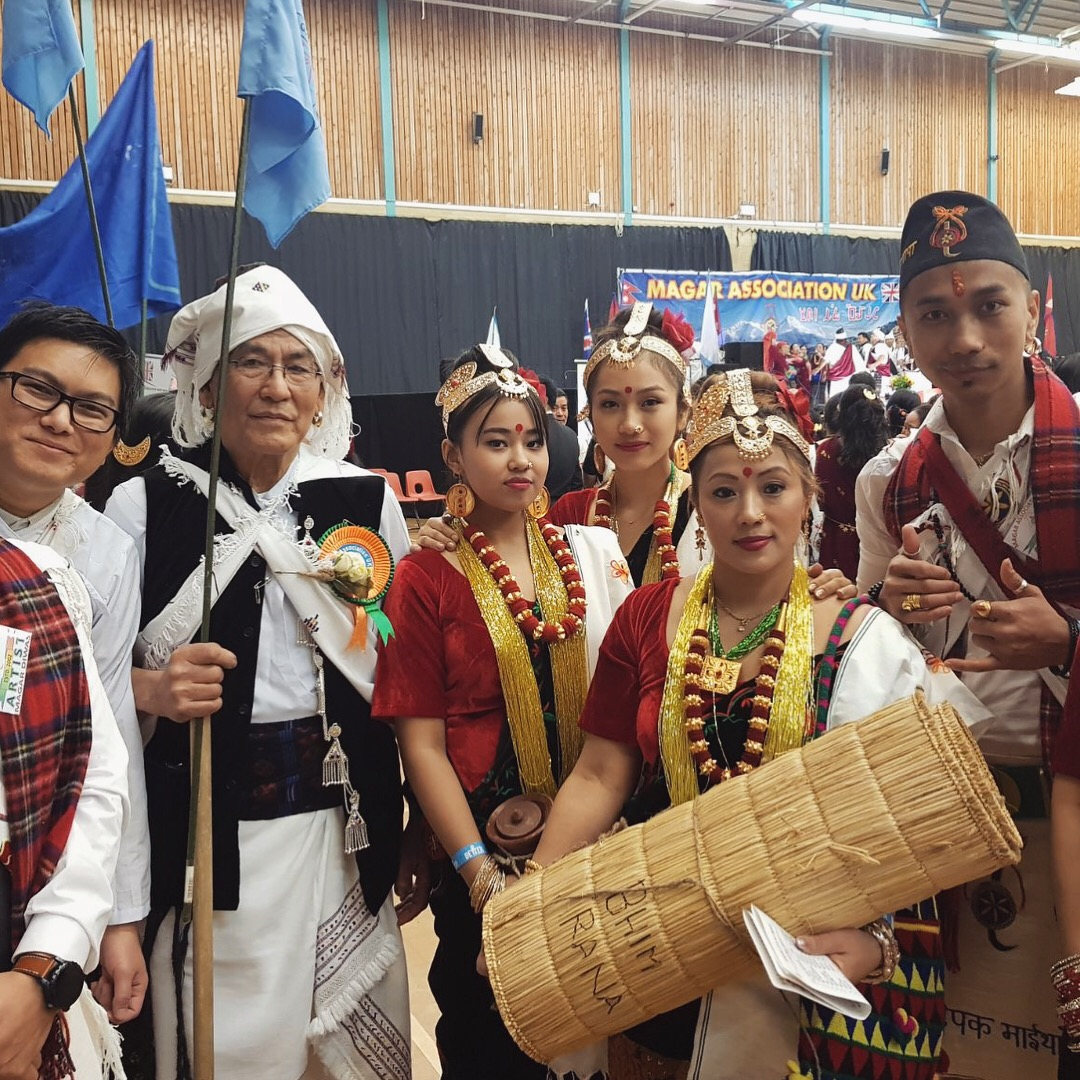
- Magars in traditional dress

Regions with significant populations
- Nepal: 2,013,498 (6.9% of Nepal's population) (2021)

Languages
- Magar Dhut, Magar Kham, Magar Kaike, Tichurong

Religion
- Hinduism:78.8% , Buddhism:15.6%,Prakriti:3.3%,Bon:0.1%(2021)

The Magars, also spelled Mangar and Mongar, are a Tibeto-Burman ethnic group native to Nepal and Northeast India, representing 6.9% of Nepal's total population according to the 2021 Nepal census. They are one of the main Gurkha tribes.

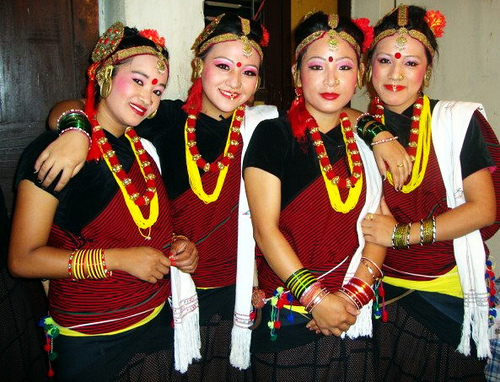
Magar girls of Nepal

The first home of the Magars was to the west of the Gandaki River and, roughly speaking, consisted of that portion of Nepal which lies between and around about Gulmi, Arghakhanchi, and Palpa. This part of the country was divided into twelve districts known as Bahra Magarat (Confederation of Twelve Magar villages), which included the following regions of that period: Argha, Khanchi, Bhirkot, Dhor, Garhung, Ghiring, Gulmi, Isma, Musikot, Rising, Satung, and Pyung. During the medieval period, the whole area from Palpa to Rukum Rolpa was called the Magarat, a place settled and inhabited by Magars. Another confederation of eighteen Magar kingdoms, known as Athara Magarat, also existed and was originally inhabited by Kham Magars.

== Geographical distribution ==
=== Nepal ===
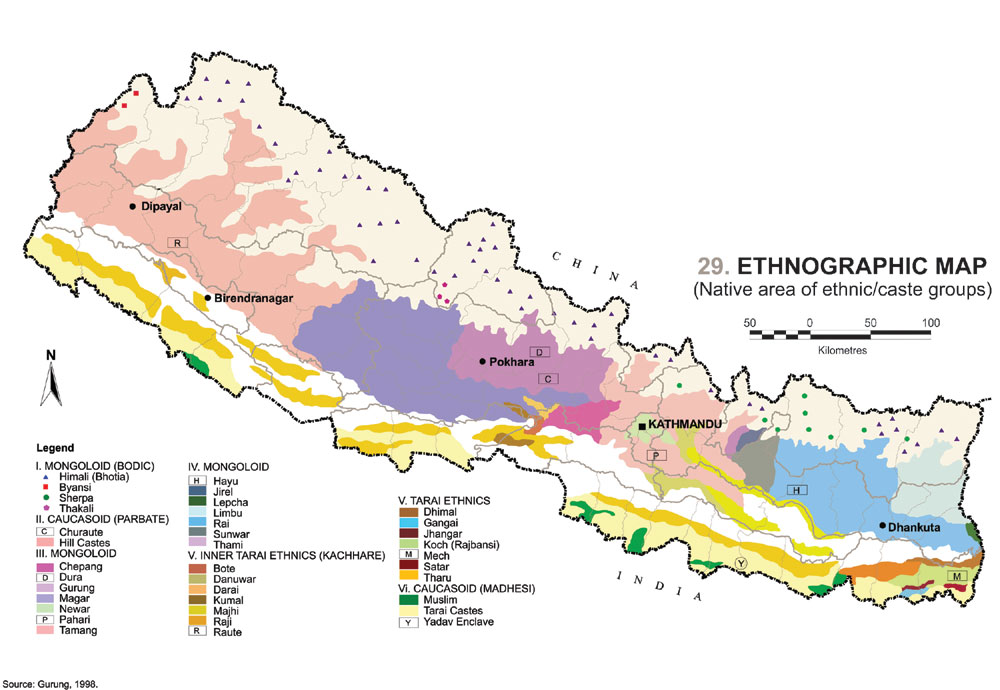
Ethnic groups in Nepal map

At the time of the 2021 Nepal census, 2,013,498 people (6.9% of the population of Nepal) identified as Magar. The frequency of Magar people by province was as follows:

- Gandaki Province (18.8%)
- Lumbini Province (14.6%)
- Karnali Province (10.4%)
- Bagmati Province (5.1%)
- Koshi Province (4%)
- Sudurpashchim Province (2%)
- Madhesh Province (1.1%)

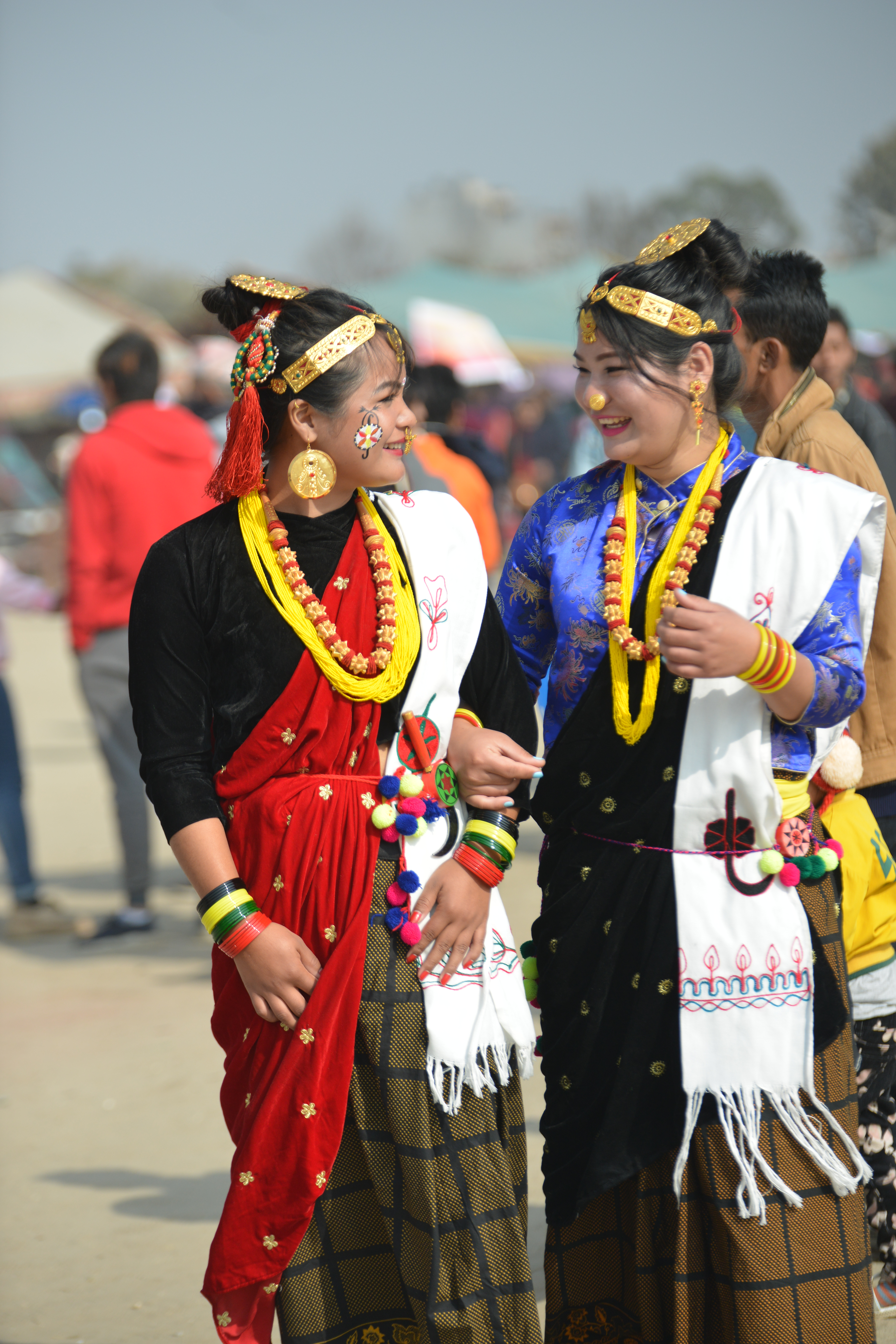
Magar girls in Maghe Sankranti

The frequency of Magar people was higher than national average in the following districts:

- Palpa (53%)
- Eastern Rukum (49.4%)
- Rolpa (42.8%)
- Myagdi (35.5%)
- Pyuthan (33.7%)
- Baglung (30%)
- Nawalpur (27.5%)
- Tanahun (26%)
- Gulmi (22.3%)
- Syangja (22%)
- Arghakhanchi (19.6%)
- Surkhet (17.3%)
- Salyan (14.6%)
- Dang (14.5%)
- Sindhuli (14.1%)
- Western Rukum (13.8%)
- Udayapur (13.3%)
- Dolpa (12.1%)
- Mustang (11.7%)
- Parbat (11.7%)
- Gorkha (11.5%)
- Okhaldhunga (11.5%)
- Rupandehi (10.9%)
- Ramechhap (10.8%)
- Dhankuta (10.3%)
- Kaski (9.7%)
- Dailekh (9.1%)
- Jajarkot (8.9%)
- Dhading (8.2%)
- Parasi District (7.1%)

=== India, United Kingdom and other countries ===
Magars are scattered throughout the cities of India in Darjeeling, Sikkim, Assam and many others. The Gurkha recruitment in the Indian Gorkha Regiment, British Gurkha Regiment and the Gurkha Contingent of Singapore Police gave a huge opportunity to the hard working Magars of the hills to work and live abroad in countries like the United Kingdom, Hong Kong, Singapore, Malaysia, Brunei, India and Myanmar. A significant number of Magar population can also be found in countries like the United Arab Emirates, Japan, Australia, Saudi Arabia, the United States of America and South Korea.

== Origin ==
There are several mythical stories describing the origins of the Magars.

The Magar of the Bahra Magarat east of the Kali Gandaki River are said to have originated in the land of Seem. Two brothers, Seem Magar and Chintoo Magar, fought, and one remained in Seem, while the other left, ending up in Kangwachen, southern Sikkim. The Bhutia people lived at the northern end of this region. Over time, the Magars became very powerful and made the northern Bhutia their vassals. Sintoo Sati Sheng ruled in a very despotic manner, and the Bhutia conspired to assassinate him. Sheng's queen took revenge and poisoned 1,000 Bhutia people at a place now called Tong Song Fong, meaning "where a thousand were murdered". The Bhutia later drove the Magars out, forcing them to again migrate further south. As part of this migration, one group migrated to Simrongadh, one group moved towards the Okhaldhunga region, and another group seems to have returned to the east. No dates are given.

The origins of the Kaike Magars end up with the mystical tales told and retold by local people. According to one of these stories, the Kaike Magars were the sons of a woman who had fled from an unspecified village of Kalyal kingdom. She subsequently gave birth to her child, a son. The boy, when he grew up, captured an angel while she was bathing with her friends. As time went by, the son and his angel bride had three sons. These sons were the ancestors of the Buddha, Roka, and Gharti clans. The origin of the fourth major clan is different. One of the three sons was a shepherd who kept losing the same female goat every day, so one day he followed her when she wandered away from the rest of the herd. He discovered that she was giving her milk to a baby boy living in the hollow part of a bamboo tree. He brought the baby home. This boy grew up and became the ancestor of the Jhankri clan. The language was called "Kaike," meaning "language of the Gods."

== History ==
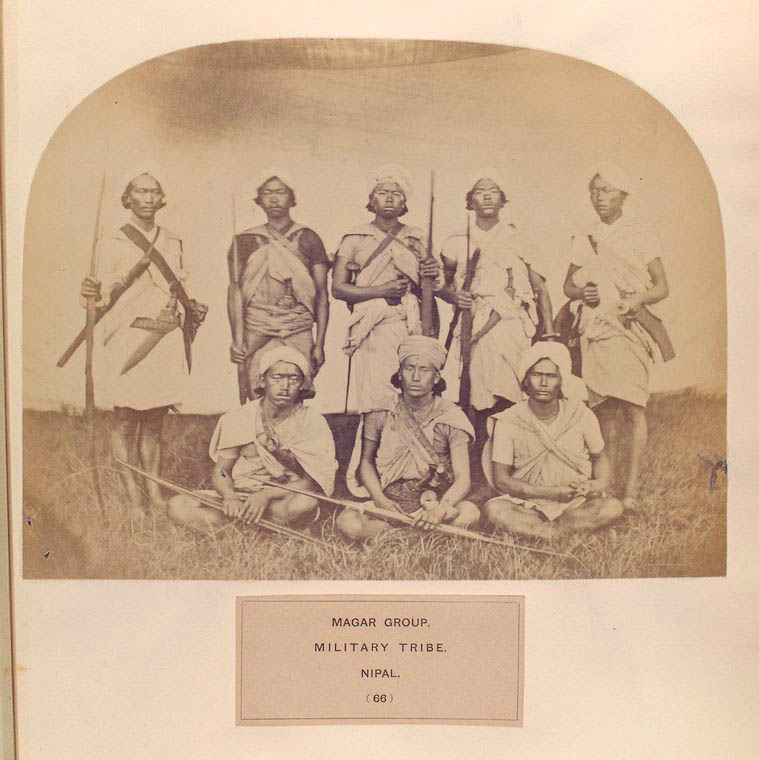
Magar group, military tribe, Nepal

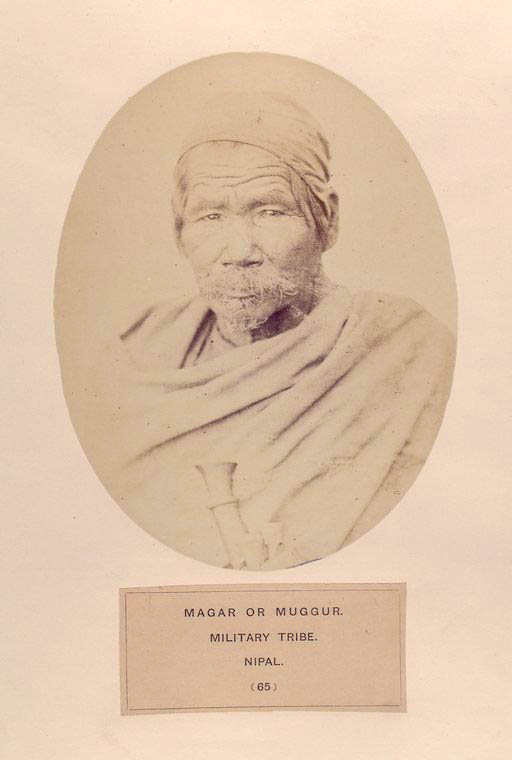
Magar man, military tribe, Nepal

The first written history about the Magar people dates as far back as 1100 CE. The Magars are one of the oldest known tribes in Nepal. Their ancient homeland was known as Magwar Bisaya, later called Magarat.

Magarat bordered from Marsyangdi river to the Pyuthan area during that time. The Magars prospered at such a level during that period that this part of the country was divided into twelve kingdoms/thams (Barah Magarant or twelve magarat)—each under its own ruler—the members of each supposedly being of common extraction in the male line. Some records show these twelve areas as being Arghak, Khachi, Gulmi, Isma, Musikot, Ghiring, Rising, Bhirkot, Payung, Garhung, Dhor and Satung. Among them, the most powerful kings were those of Gulmi, Argha, Khachi. Broadly speaking, the twelve Magarat consisted of present-day Argha, Khanchi, Gulmi, Isma, Musikot, Ghiring, Baldengadhi, Rudrapurgadhi, Deuchuli, Tanahang/Tanu-hyula (Tanahu), Kanhu, Ligligkot, Gorkhakot, (Bahakot), Targhakot (Takukot), and Makawanpur areas. Similarly, Athara (eighteen) Magarat consisted of the following regions: Dhurkoi (Gulmi), Gharkoi (Arghakhachi), Paiya (Parbat), Sinkhang (Myagdi), Narikoi (Pyuthan), Balungbang (Pyuthan), Jangkoi (Rolpa), Rukumkoi (Rukum), Chhilikoi (Dang), Bhaba (Dailekh), Borekoi (Jajarkot), Tarakoi (Dolpa), Timarkoi (Jumla), Jural (Doti), Bunkot, Bahrakot, Lu Nanya (Dadeldhura) and Ru-pal (Dadeldhura).

The Magars of the middle and western regions also played an important role in Nepal's formative history. Their kingdom was one of the strongest of west Nepal in and around Palpa District during the time of the 22 Baisi Rajya and 24 Chaubisi Rajya principalities (17th and early 18th centuries). In the 16th century, Palpa ruler Mukunda Sen briefly invaded the Kathmandu valley. King Dalsur Ghale Magar (1604-1615 BS) was a king of Liglig-Kot until Dravya Shah captured LigligKot and became the king. Ganga Ram Rana Magar also helped Drabya Shah. Ligligkot is also considered the foundation of the Gorkha Kingdom and the foundation of our nation . After Dravya Shah captured LigligKot from Magar King Dalsur Ghale Magar, he captured Gorkhakot, the last Magarat area, from the Magar King, Mansingh Khadka Magar in BS 1616 Bhadra 25. In the kingdoms of Gorkha and Musikot, the Magars even seem to have taken part in their own initial defeat, revealing both the weakness of their ethnic solidarity at that time and the presence of clan rivalries. As mentioned in the Journal of the Asiatic Society of Bengal founded by Sir William Jones in 1784, the city of Gorkha was originally the residence of Chitoria (Chitorey) Magars, and the city was built by them. To this day, large numbers of Chitoria/Chitorey Magars are found in the Gorkha District. Additionally, in the Manakamana Temple located in Gorkha, it is mandatory for a priest to be a Magar; specifically, the priest must be a descendant of Saint Lakhan Thapa Magar, who is described as a spiritual guide for Ram Shah, and he had a very close relationship with the queen, who was considered an incarnation of the Goddess. Interestingly, the main priests of Kalika, the goddess protecting the kingdoms of Lamjung and Gorkha, were also Bohara Magars; it is striking to note how the Magars have been in charge of the religious functions linked to the very source of Thakuri power.

The 18th-century king, Prithvi Narayan Shah, the founder of the modern Kingdom of Nepal announced and loved to call himself ' the King of Magarat' or 'the King of Magar country'. According to Marie Lecomte-Tilouine, a senior researcher in Social Anthropology at the French National Center for Scientific Research, Prithvi Narayan Shah narrated in his autobiography about praying to a goddess whom he described as 'the daughter of Rana [Magar]. During the time of King Prithvi Narayan, Rana Magars were one of the six-member courtiers (Tharghar). Prithvi Narayan Shah in his memories also recalls his Magar dada—the man who looked after him during his childhood.

The Scottish contemporary writer, Francis Buchanan-Hamilton, contends in his journal that the Shah dynasty was derived from the Magar tribe. He argues that:

The family of Gorkha or Gorkha Kingdom which now governs Nepal, although it pretends to come from Chittor, according to Sadhu Ram, (Note: As per Francis Buchanan-Hamilton, Sadhu Ram Upadhyaya was a Brahmin belonging to the family of hereditary Purohits (royal priests) of Kingdom of Palpa.) a good authority, is, in reality, of the Magar tribe; and, at any rate, these people are now firmly attached to its interests, by having largely shared in the sweets of conquest; and by far the greatest part of the regular troops of that family is composed of this nation.

— An account of the Kingdom of Nepal

He further contended on Shah family that:

The family pretends to be of the Pamar tribe; but it is alleged, as I have already explained, that this is a mere fable, and that, on the arrival of the colony from Chitaur, this family were Magars.

— An account of the Kingdom of Nepal

Many prominent historians of Nepal have claimed that Aramudi, an eighth-century ruler of the Kali Gandaki region, was a Magar King. "Aramudi" derives from the word for 'river' in the Magar language. 'Ari' – 'Source of Water' + 'Modi'– 'River' = 'Arimodi' or 'Aramudi', thus the literal meaning of Aramudi is a source of river. But due to the lack of historical evidence, there are some conflicting ideas among the historians.

Sen dynasty of Palpa were Magar Kings as per the hand-written treatise 'Naradsmriti' and history books written in Sikkim. In a palm-leaf manuscript kept in the Kaiser Library, dated 1567 VS (1510), Mukunda Sen is described as a Magar king of Palpa who invaded the Kathmandu Valley in 1581 VS (1524). Thus, in the 17th century, Malla kings of Kathmandu valley were united to fight back the invasion of Magars from Palpa. One of Mukunda Sen's wives was also the daughter of the Magar King of Parkogha: Mahadevi Suvarnamala, and she had four sons: Manishya Sen, Imbarsen, Kuvar and Lohang Sen. Similarly, Gajalaxman Singh, Magar King of Makvanpur, whose daughter Kantivati was married to Abhaya Sen (Magar King) of Palpa. From her was born the great king of kings Bhattarajadeva. Around 1700, the ruler of Baldeng (near present-day Butwal) was overthrown by Palpa and other chaubisi states, and he was supposedly a Magar king.

== Subdivisions ==
Magars are divided into the following Eight tribes (clans) listed here in an alphabetical order: Ale, Budha/Budhathoki, Chitorey/Chitaurey, Gharti, Pun, Rana, Roka, Thapa. These tribes all intermarry with each other, have the same customs, and are in every way equal as regards to social standing. Each tribe is subdivided into many sub-clans.

=== Ale Magars ===
Arghali, Durungchung, Hiski, Hungchen, Limel, Pade, Rakhal, Suyal, Sirpali, Pangmi

=== Budhathoki / Budha Magars ===
Gamal, Jugjali, Pahari, Thami, Arkali, Ulange, Karmani, Kosila, Gamal, Chini, Jiyali, Thami, Janjali, Darlasi, Deowal, Namjali, Pare, Pahare, Pojange, Barkabiri, Balkoti, Ramjali, Romkhami, Sinjali/Singjali, Jujali, Lamichhane, Khame, Doyal.

=== Chitorey/Chitaurey ===
Chitorey, Chitaurey

=== Gharti Magars ===
Dagami, Galami, Kalikotey, Pahari or Panre, Phagami, Rangu, Rawal, Rajali, Sawangi, Sene, Surai, Sinjapati, Sijapati, Talaji, Tirukia, Wale, Thini, Bhujel.

=== Pun Magars ===
Birkali, Baijali, Buduja, Paija, sain, Chochangi, Sinjali, Dut, Purja, Garbuja, Ramjali, Tilija, Armaja, Rantija, Pahare, Sutpahare/Sut-Pahare, Thane/Thanh, Thajali, Jugjali, Phagami/Fagami, Phungali, Sanangi, Sothi, Khame, Khoroja, Tirke, Sabangi, Gaura, Balali, Batha, Saureni, Serpuja/Sherpunja

=== Rana Magars ===
Aachhami, Aslami, Bangling, Chumi, Gyangmi/Gyami, Kharka/Khadka, Kyapchaki/Kepchaki, Lungeli, Makkim, Maski, Marchu, Palli, Ruchal, Shrees, Surjabansi/Suryabangsi, Limel, Deuka, Jung, Fewali, Basista

=== Roka Magars ===
Jelbangi, Dununge, Ramjali, Bajhangi, Baijali.

=== Thapa Magars ===
To name a few – Āthaghare, Bagale, Bakabal, Bakheti, Baraghare, Birkatta, Kala, Kammu, Khapangi, Palunge, Puwar/Punwar, Sunari, Sāthighare, Sinjali/Singjali, Saplangi, Midun, Mugmi, Pulami, Darlami, Salami, Jarga, Dhenga, Taramu, Tarami, Tarangi, Tangnami, Byangnasi, Masrangi

Gaha Thapa consists of Bucha, Gora, khangaha/khanga.

Reshmi Thapa consists of Dangal.

Saru Thapa consists of Jhapurluk, Jhendi/Jhedi, Kala. Besides these, Gurbachan, Purbachhaney, Phounja, Chauhan, Pachabhaiya, Khamcha, Khandaluk, Ghale, Baral, Somai, Pithakote, Jhakote, Rakaskoti/Raskoti, Uchai, Samal.

In former days, any Thapa who had lost three generations of ancestors in battle became a Rana, but with the prefix of his Thapa clan. Thus, a Reshmi Thapa would become a Reshmi Rana. An instance of this is to be found in the 5th Gurkhas, where a havildar, Lachman Thapa, and a naik, Shamsher Rana, descended from the two Thapa [Magars] brothers; but three generations of descendants from one of these brothers having been killed in the battle, Shamsher Rana's ancestors assumed the title of Rana while Lachman Thapa's ancestors not having been killed in battle for three generations remained a Thapa. From this custom many Rana sub clans are said to have sprung up, and this would lead one to believe that the Rana-Magar clan was looked up to amongst the Magars.

The Rana clan of Magar tribes come from the same stock of Thapa, but when they were separated from their original group and lost for three generations, they settled in a place called lamjung and called themselves by the name of Rana which means chief in khas tradition and language. Thus, the inhabitants of Rana Magar became the lamjung village. The Matwala Khas are generally the progeny of a Khas of Western Nepal and karnali with a Magar woman of Western Nepal. If the woman happens to belong to the khas mixed Rana clan of the Magar tribe, progeny is then called a Bhat Rana. The Matwala Khas doesn't wear the sacred thread. They eats pork and drinks alcohol, and in every way assimilates himself with the Magars. He invariably claims to be a matwali khas or pawai khas.

Linguistically, the Magars are divided into three groups. Baraha Magaratis speak Dhut dialect, whereas Athara Magaratis speak Pang and Kaike dialects.

Magar Dhut speakers: Rana, Ale, Thapa

Magar Kham speakers: Budhathoki, Pun, Roka, Gharti

Magar Kaike speakers: Tarali Magar of Dolpa; Budha, Gharti, Roka/Rokaya, Kayat, Jhakri all Magar clans residing in Dolpa and Karnali districts.

== Language and script ==
At the time of 2021 Nepal census, of the 2,013,498 Magar population in Nepal, about 810,315 speak Magar Dhut, 91,753 speak Magar Kham and 1,225 speak Magar Kaike as their mother tongue while the rest speak Nepali as their mother tongue. The Magar languages are rooted in the Bodic branch of the Tibetan family.

The Magar language, Magar Kura, is spoken in two major dialects and a number of sub dialects reflecting the geographic distribution of the group. The Western Magars of Rapti Zone speak Magar Kham language. In Dolpa District, Magars speak Magar Kaike. Magar Dhut language speakers are all Magar clans residing in Twelve Magarat. Similarly Magar Kham language speakers are all Magar clans from Eighteen Magarat. Magar Kaike language speakers are all Magar clans in Karnali zone.

Magar Akkha is used in Sikkim as a Magar language script. Many scholars including Malabar Singh Thapa have been in forefront to implement the Akkha script to write Magar language in Nepal. New generations have been learning it. Akkha script is said to be closely associated with Brahmi script.

Magar speakers to population ratio in following Provinces of Nepal:

- Koshi Province (72.8%)
- Madhesh Province (68.1%)
- Gandaki Province (51%)
- Sudurpashchim Province (50.2%)
- Bagmati Province (47%)
- Lumbini Province (34.1%)
- Karnali Province (23.1%)

The following districts has the highest Magar speakers to population ratio:

- Panchthar (93.3%)
- Tehrathum (89.8%)
- Dhankuta (89.7%)
- Khotang (87.2%)
- Okhaldhunga (84.4%)
- Mahottari (84.1%)
- Taplejung (83.4%)
- Udayapur (82.8%)
- Nawalpur (80%)
- Sankhuwasabha (79.7%)
- Tanahun (75.6%)
- Sarlahi (73.6%)
- Bhojpur (71.2%)
- Syangja (70%)

== Religion ==
Per the Nepali census, 79% of Magars follow Hinduism, though there is high degree of syncretism with Buddhism, animism and ancestor worship. Magars follow Buddhism and Hinduism. The original religions or beliefs of Magar people are Shamanism, Animism, Ancestor worship and northern Nepal's Magar follow Shamanism.

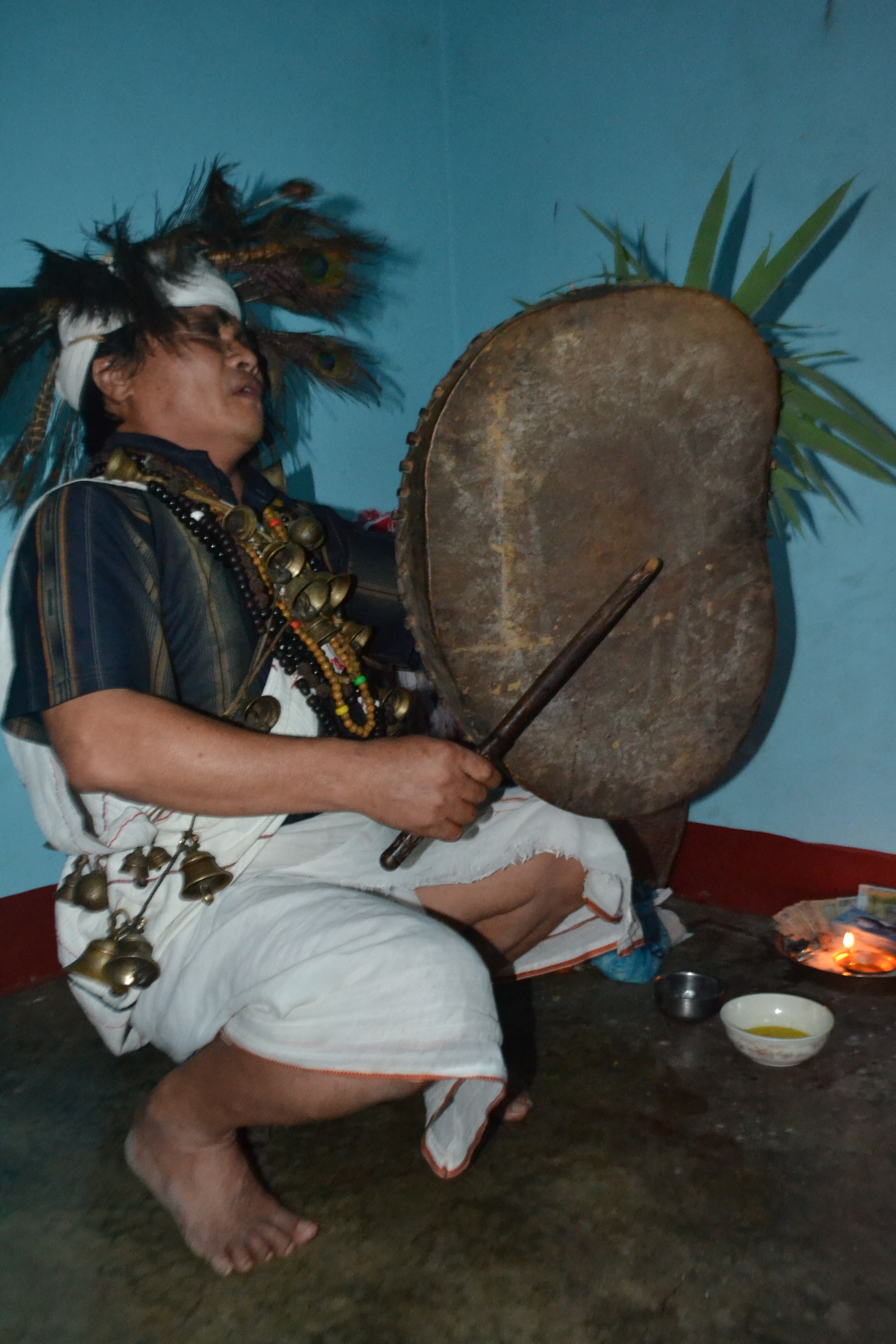
Magars of Western Nepal have been practicing shamanism during their kul pooja.

Magars are the main priests of the famous Manakamana Temple in Gorkha District, Budha Subba Temple in Dharan and Alamdevi temple (Nepal's former Shah Kings' mother Goddess or family deity) in Syangja District. In Manakamana Temple, specially, the priest must be a descendant of Saint Lakhan Thapa Magar, who is described as a spiritual guide for Ram Shah, and he had a very close relationship with the queen, who was considered an incarnation of the Goddess Durga Bhawani, an incarnation of Parvati. Similarly, Bhirkot, Gahraukot, Khilung, Nuwakot, Satahukot, Sarankot, Dhor, Lamjung, Gorkha Kalika, Salyankot Dhading also have Magar priests from Saru, Baral, Saru, Saru, Pulami, Chumi, Darlami, DudhrRana, Bhusal/Maski, Saru/Rana Magar clan respectively.

The main priests of Kalika, the goddess protecting the kingdoms of Lamjung and Gorkha, were also Bohara Magars. Magars have been in charge of the religious functions linked to the very source of Thakuri power.

Most Magars also follow a form of Tibetan Buddhism, with priests known as Lama Guru, forming the religious hierarchy. Buddhism is an important part of the culture even in the southern districts, where the Magars have developed a syncretic form of religion that combines earlier shamanistic and Buddhist rituals with Hindu traditions.

Animists and shamanism form part of the local belief system; their dhami (the faith healer or a kind of shaman) is called Dangar and their jhankri (another kind of faith healer or shaman) was the traditional spiritual and social leader of the Magars. Magars have an informal cultural institution, called Bhujel, who performs religious activities, organizes social and agriculture-related festivities, brings about reforms in traditions and customs, strengthens social and production system, manages resources, settles cases and disputes and systematizes activities for recreation and social solidarity.

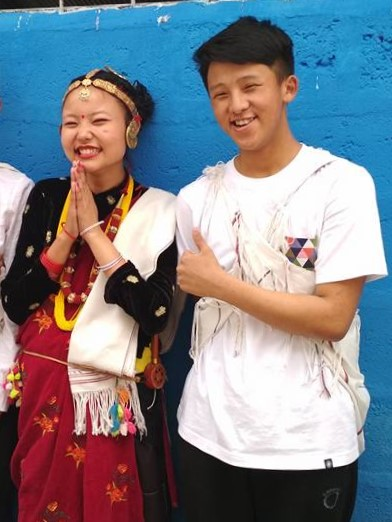
Two Magar children wearing jewelry and items of traditional dress.

== Dress and ornaments ==
Men wear kachhad or wrap-on-loincloth, a bhangra, a bhoto or a shirt of vest, and the usual Nepali topi. Women wear the phariya or lunghi, chaubandhi cholo or a closed blouse and the heavy patuka or waistband, and the mujetro or shawl-like garment on the head.

The ornaments are the madwari on the ears, bulaki on the nose and the phuli on the left nostril, the silver coin necklace"[haari]" and the pote (yellow and Green beads) with the tilhari gold cylinder, [jantar], [dhungri], [naugedi], [phul], kuntha, and also raiya in the hand. Magar males do not wear many ornaments, but some are seen to have silver earrings, hanging from their earlobes, called "gokkul". The magar girls wear the amulet or locket necklace, and women of the lower hills and the high-altitude ones wear these made of silver with muga stones embedded in them and kantha. The bangles of silver and glass are also worn on their hands along with the sirbandhi, sirphuli and chandra on their heads. These are large pieces of gold beaten in elongated and circular shapes.

== Festivals ==
=== Maghe Sankranti ===
Maghe Sankranti is considered to be one of the most important annual festivals of the indigenous Magar community. In fact, Maghe Sankranti is the government declared national festival of the Magar community as well as the Tharu community (2009 AD). It is celebrated on the first day of Magh (tenth month of the Nepali calendar, in mid-January), a time that marks the transition from winter to spring. According to the Magar terminology, Maghe Sakranti commemorates the end of udheli (literally 'down'), which is a period that lasts for six months starting from mid-July, and the initiation of ubheli ('up'), the period lasting for another six months starting from the mid-January. The down and up periods probably correspond to the annual cycle of herding livestock up and down from high pastures, a historically important economic activity of the Magars. The occasion is celebrated with a host of gatherings and special invitations to chelibetis, one's daughters and other female members of the family. Traditional Magar songs and dances are also performed. One of the most prominent food items prepared on this day (or any other celebratory occasion) is known as batuk (commonly known as 'bara'). It is considered to be a traditional food of the Magar people. Shaped like western doughnuts, it is made from black lentils that have been soaked for over twenty-four hours and are grounded to form a thick paste. It is then mixed with salt, pepper and turmeric and fried in oil. A perfect round shape is formed with the help of the palm, and a small distinct hole is made in the center.

=== Bhume Puja ===
Bhume Puja (also known as Bal puja) is one of the festivals celebrated by the Kham Magar people from Lumbini and Karnali provinces of Nepal. The term Bhume means 'Earth' in Nepali language. The Kham people practice a religion that worships the land (bhumi puja), water sprouts (shim), forests (ban puja) and weather, asking for better crop yields and cattle. The Kham people believe that the Earth is God. Earth is considered to be the mother and protector which provides shelter, food and sustenance for everyone. To make the Earth happy, people perform the dance from mid-May through mid-June. The main celebration takes place during the first week of June.

=== Other Major Festivals ===
- Chandi Purnima, Baisakhe Purnima, Mangsir Purnima, Jestha Purnima.
- Magar people celebrates major festival like "Chhaigo" as Lhosar which is considered as the New Year for Magar community according to the Naagchi Sambat. Magar people also observe festivals like Chaiti, Rungma, Keja, Yacha etc. These festivals are based on the Tibetan Buddhism and the Bon culture.

== Folk songs and dances ==
Magars have contributed phenomenally in Nepali folk songs and dances. Both men and women take part in folk songs and dances.

=== Sorathi ===
One of the most well-known Magar folk-dances is Sorathi or Maruni dance practiced during Tihar festival. In this dance, the main dancer wears a woman's dress, has someone to mimic her dance and one person to beat a Madal or Rani Madal. This dance is believed to be of divine origin and is directly linked with mythology. The role of the person beating the Madal is considered to be the most important, and even the one who mimics the main dancer is actually considered to be the protectors of the dancer. He wears a mask, entertains the crowd by his own gestures etc. The wearing of the dress by the dance is given a ritualistic position, as the dancer's dress, are elaborately laid along with flowers, rice etc. on a brass plate or a winnower. The dance begins with the worship of Madal, the dress, and other ornaments to be used by the dancer, followed by obeisance to all gods and goddesses like Saraswati, Ram, Sita. The dance ends with blessings to the family that has offered alms to the dancing group and brings the end to the dance ritualistically. The dance originated with the Magar community, and later on, people from the various communities started adopting it. Maruni in Western Nepal is different than in other places. Maruni and Sorathi dances were created in Western Nepal by the Magar community, and Magars who migrated to Eastern Nepal started to make small changes as they performed it there too.

=== Kaura ===
Kaura, also known as "Kaanraha" in Magar language, is a folk musical performance indigenous to the hilly regions of Nepal. It is one of the most popular dances in Nepal. Kaura was originated in the Magar community of Rishing Ranipokhari, Tanahun. According to historians, it was originally called "Kaanraha". It typically involves rhythmic movements accompanied by traditional music, often performed during festivals or cultural celebrations to showcase the community's heritage and identity.

=== Hurra ===
Hurra is a dance of the Magar community which is performed during Tihar festival. Hurra Naach was originated in the Magar community of Mudebas Village of Dhankuta. Hurra has been observed from time unknown but it is widely believed that this culture started from 1850 AD. Hurra, now is considered as a broad culture merely than just a cultural dance. After taking permission from the village Mukhiya, Hurra dance culture starts from the porch of Mukhiya's house and then the whole village sing songs for Deusi/Bhailo and dance on the tunes of the madal. The dance is widely performed in almost all the parts of eastern Nepal.

=== Bhume Naach ===
Bhume Naach is one of the popular dances practiced by the Kham Magar people from Lumbini and Karnali provinces of Nepal. The term Bhume means 'Earth' and Naach means 'dance' in Nepali language. The main dance of Bhume Naach, requires that the village boys dance in the center of a circle surrounded by dancing girls who wear beautiful clothing, jewellery, and flowers. The Bhume Naach highlights and celebrates the fact that without Earth there is no life.

=== Salaijo ===
Salaijo is a popular Nepali folk song originating from the western region of Nepal. The lyrics of Salaijo typically revolve around topics of love and loss, and the song is often used as a way to express emotions.

=== Yanimaya ===
Yanimaya Bhaka is considered to have originated from the Magar community around the villages of Baglung and Myagdi. It is a form of a ballad and the song is often used as a way to express emotions.

=== Other Folk-Songs and Dances ===
Ghatu, Jhorra, Sunimaya, Rung, Bon Lama Naach.

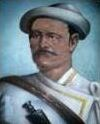
General Abhiman Singh Rana Magar

== Occupations ==
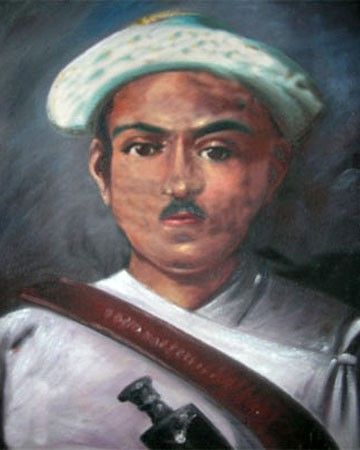
Kaji Biraj Thapa Magar, 1st Army Chief of Prithvi Narayan Shah of Gorkha and the ‘Kingmaker’

Agriculture and the military are the primary sources of income. Magars constitute the largest number of Gurkha soldiers outside Nepal. Kaji Sarbajit Rana Magar became the head of government during the regency of Queen Rajendra Laxmi. Kaji Biraj Thapa Magar winner of limbuwan, Kaji Jayant Rana Magar was a Gorkhali general of the Gorkha Kingdom and the Kingdom of Kantipur, General Abhiman Singh Rana Magar and Kaji Sarbajit Rana Magar headed the Nepal army. Biraj Thapa Magar was the first army chief in Nepal Army's history.

Dor Bahadur Bista's observation of Magar's occupation during the 1960s was:

Some of the northernmost Magars have become quite prosperous by engaging in long-range trading that takes them from near the northern border to the Terai, and even beyond to Darjeeling and Calcutta. Were it not for their role in the Gurkha regiments of the Indian and British armies, their self-sufficiency might be endangered.

Toni Hagen, who did his field research in Nepal during the 1950s, observed:

Magars possess considerable skill as craftsmen: they are the bridge builders and blacksmiths among the Nepalese, and the primitive mining is largely in their hands. On the lower courses of the Bheri & Karnali rivers, a great number of Magars annually migrate to the Terai & there manufacture bamboo panniers, baskets, and mats for sale in the bazaars along the borders. In their most northerly settlement, on the other hand, the important trading centre of Tarakot on the Barbung river, they have largely adopted their way of life, their clothes, and their religion to that of the Tibetans; like the latter, they also live by the salt trade. As regard race, the Magars have almond-shaped eyes or even open eyes, whereas Mongoloid eyes are very rare.

== Military service ==
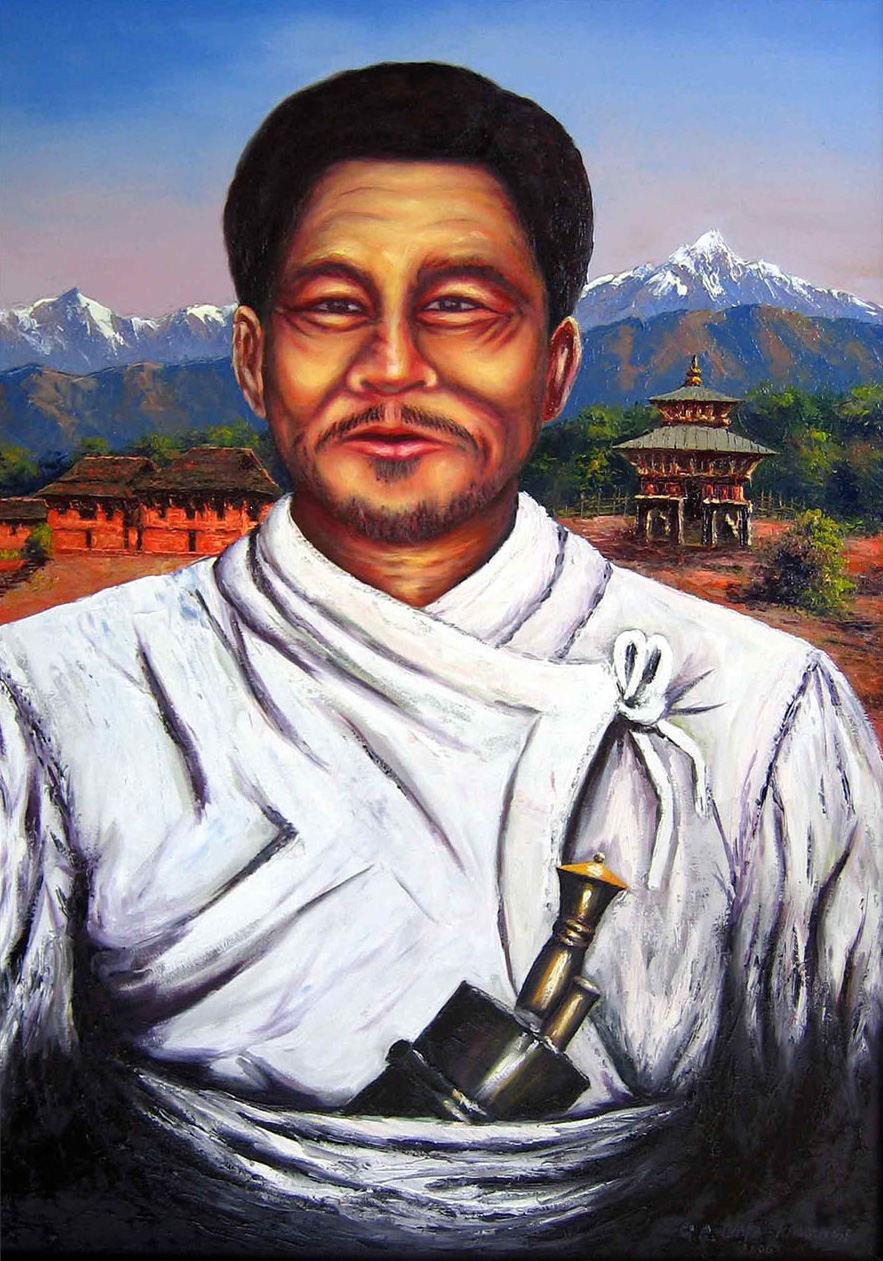
Lakhan Thapa Magar – "First Martyr of Nepal" as a Raja of Bungkot who rebelled against the rule of the Rana Dynasty

In the 1750s, Prithvi Narayan Shah, the "Father of Modern Nepal", was consolidating the many petty kingdoms scattered across the land. For this task, he counted heavily upon his Magar soldiers. The outside world, however, came to know of the Magars only after the British began recruiting soldiers in Nepal for Gurkha regiments from 1815. The British quickly came to appreciate the Magars' qualities and they became an integral part of their Gurkha Regiments.

A number of Magars have distinguished themselves in military service under Nepali, British and Indian military. During Anglo-Nepalese War (1814–16), the Magar Unit/Paltan of Nepali Army, Purano Gorakh Battalion, valiantly fought the Battle of Nalapani. Brigadier General Sher Jung Thapa Magar received Mahavir Chakra and Lieutenant Colonel Dhan Singh Thapa Magar won Paramvir Chakra, the highest gallantry award, while serving Indian Army. Similarly, Dipprasad Pun Magar, a Nepalese Sergeant of the Royal Gurkha Rifles (British Army), was the first Nepali winner of the Conspicuous Gallantry Cross for his valor in Afghanistan in 2010. In the two World Wars, a total of 5 Victoria Cross (out of 13 VCs awarded to Gurkhas) were awarded to the Magars:

- First World War:
  - VC Rifleman Kulbir Thapa Magar was the first Gurkha to win Victoria Cross in recognition of his valor and bravery. He was from Baglung District. He served in 2/3 Gurkha Regiment (GR). He received Victoria Cross in France in 1915.
  - VC Rifleman Karanbahadur Rana Magar, Bharse Gulmi was from 2/3 GR. He was awarded the Victoria Cross for valour on 10 Apr 1917 at El Kafr in Palestine.
- Second World War:
  - VC Subedar Lalbahadur Thapa Magar, Nepal Tara was from 2nd GR. He was from Sumsa Baglung. He received Victoria Cross in Tunisia in 1943.
  - VC Honorary Lieutenant Tul Bahadur Pun Magar, Myagdi was from 6th GR. He received Victoria Cross in Burma in 1944.
  - VC Subedar Netrabahadur Thapa Magar, was from 5th GR. He was from Raghu Bhimad, Tanahun. He received Victoria Cross in Burma in 1944.

== Magars in the People's War (1996-2006) ==
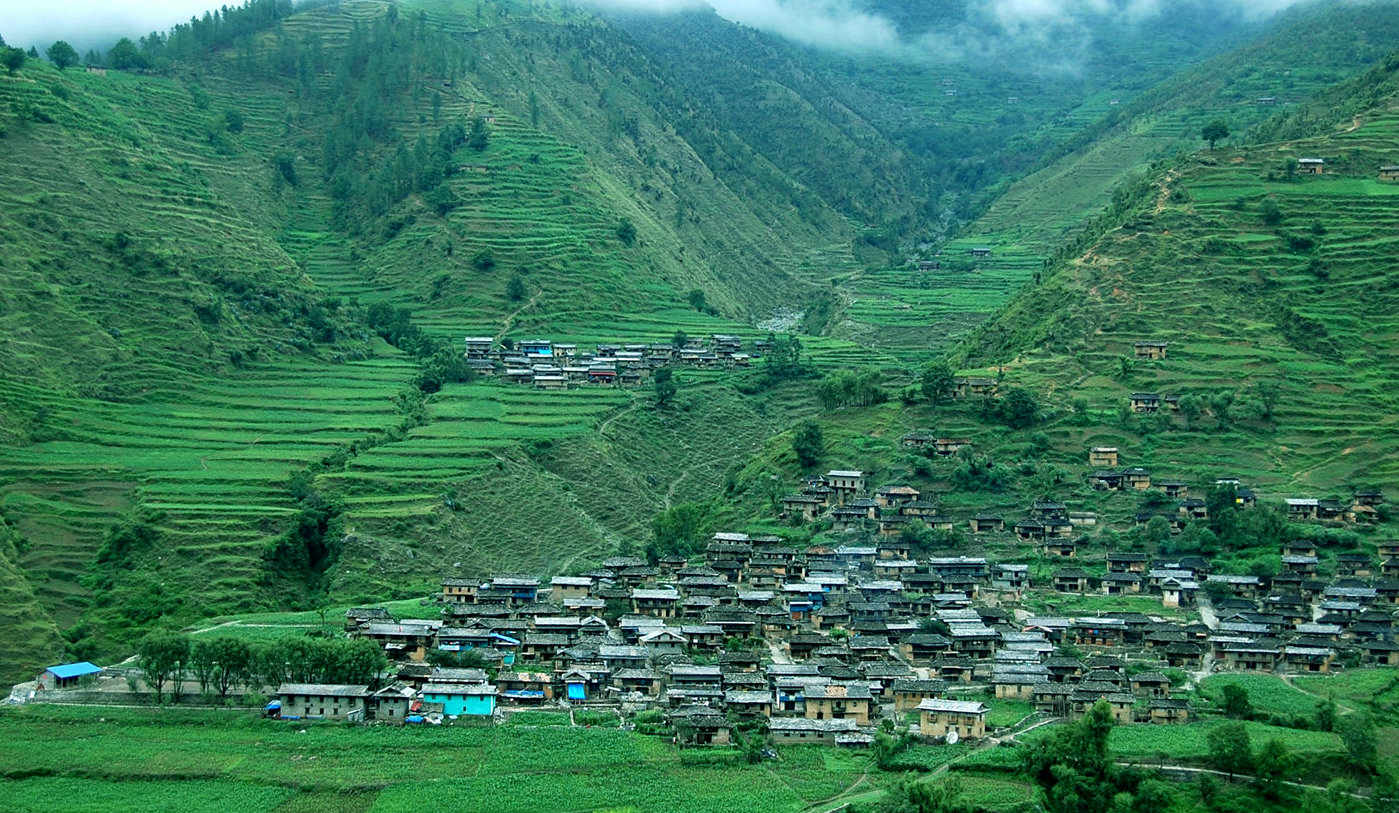
Thabang, Rolpa Maoist Heartland Magar Village

The Magar community played the most significant and historic role during the Nepalese Civil War (1996-2006) led by the Communist Party of Nepal (Maoist Centre) aimed at overthrowing the monarchy and establishing a people's republic. As the largest indigenous ethnic group of the country, Magars constituted a major portion of the People's Liberation Army and the political base supporting the insurgency. In western regions such as Rolpa, East Rukum, West Rukum, Dailekh, Salyan, Doti, Palpa, Baglung, Myagdi, Dang, Jajarkot, Nawalpur, Tanahun, Gorkha, Gulmi, Kailali, Arghakhanchi, Kapilvastu and Pyuthan, where Magar populations are dense, support for the Maoist movement was widespread. Similarly, in eastern regions such as Sindhuli, Panchthar, Ramechhap, Dhankuta, Rasuwa, Okhaldhunga, Morang, Udayapur, Jhapa and Kavrepalanchok, the Magars played a vital role for the revolution despite their less numbers compared to the west. Thousands of Magar youths responded to the call for revolution, motivated by historic marginalization, generation of exclusion, economic hardship, and promises of ethnic liberation and social justice. They became the backbone of People's Liberation Army, renowned for their bravery, endurance and discipline on the battlefield. Beyond the battlefields, Magar villages provided essential support networks, risking government retaliation to offer food, shelter, and intelligence to the insurgents.

Some Magar activists have argued that the Maoist movement mobilized Magars as the foot-soldiers, in a way similar to the Gorkhali rulers did for their conquest. Although there may be some merit in that argument, evidence shows that Magars have gained in political representation and consolidation since the end of the Maoist conflict in 2006. Every government that has come to power since, has had Magar leaders holding a prominent ministerial position. Leaders from Rolpa like Barsaman Pun, Onsari Gharti Magar and Jaypuri Gharti have occupied important ministerial portfolio in several governments over the past one and half decades. Nanda Kishor Pun, who was among the senior commanders from Rolpa in the People's Liberation Army served as the Vice President of Nepal while Ram Bahadur Thapa, who is from Gulmi has held Deputy Prime Minister and Home Minister's office. Suresh Ale Magar from Tanahun, Lokendra Bista Magar from Western Rukum, Kamala Roka and Purna Bahadur Gharti Magar from Eastern Rukum, and Bina Magar from Kanchanpur are some of the prominent politicians from the Communist Party of Nepal (Maoist Centre).

The Nepalese Civil War profoundly impacted the Magar community, but their sacrifices and contributions also reshaped Nepal itself, altering Nepal's political structure, ultimately leading to the abolition of the Shah dynasty and the establishment of Federal Democratic Republic of Nepal.

== Politics ==
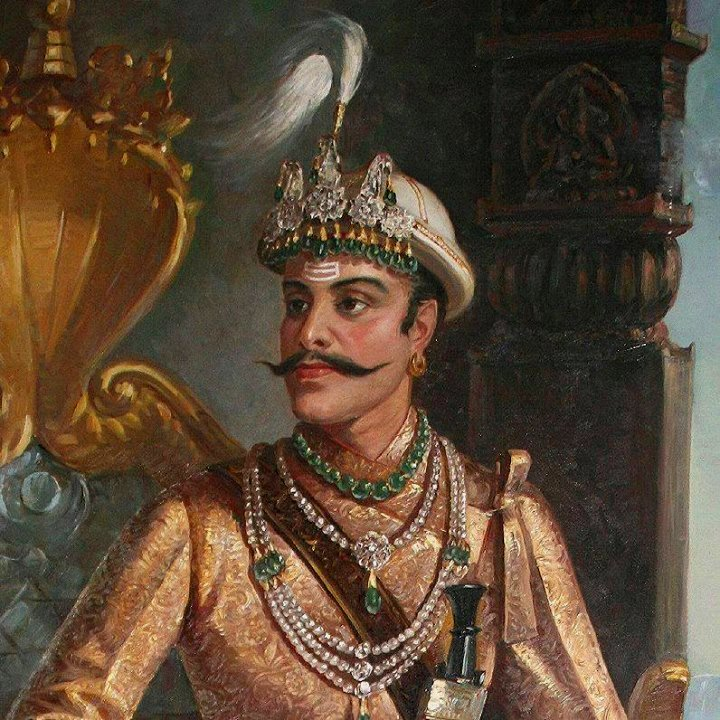
Rana Bahadur Shah (1777-1799), King of Nepal, Kaji Sarbajit Rana Magar was made a Kaji in his kingship

Magars since the formation of Nepali state had been in a very influential role in the Nepali government until the Kot Massacre. During the time of King Prithvi Narayan Shah and thereafter, Magars were one of the six courtiers of Kings. Nepali military historian Brigadier General (retired) Dr Prem Singh Basnyat also confirm the high government positions held by the Magars notably Biraj Thapa Magar, Kaji Jayant Rana Magar, Kaji Bandhu Rana Magar, Kaji Sarbajit Rana Magar and Abhiman Singh Rana Magar. During the Rana Dynasty, Magars almost had nil representation in any government positions, which can be considered the darkest time.

Under the leadership of minister Giri Prasad Burathoki Magar, the first ever Magar Convention was held in Bharse of Gulmi District, one of the 12 Magarat in 1957. The objective of the conference was to sensitize the Magars to come forward in the national spectrum. Later Magar political and social organisations included Nepal Langhali Pariwar (1972), Nepal Langhali Pariwar Sang, and Langhali Pariwar Sangh.

Nepal Magar Association is an un-biased and non-profit organization of Magar indigenous people. It is a common representative organization of all the Magar indigenous people of Nepal and is committed to the preservation and promotion of Magar language and culture; the upliftment of the social-economic and the overall educational condition of the Magar people.

== Notable Magars ==
- Saint Lakhan Thapa (17th century), a spiritually famed associate and adviser to King Ram Shah and the first Priest of Manakamana Temple.
- Kaji Biraj Thapa Magar of Gorkha, the 'King Maker'. From the list of people with title Kaji.
- Kaji Biraj Thapa Magar, the first Chief of Gorkhali Army, 18th century.
- Kaji Jayant Rana Magar (Kaji of Gorkha and Kantipur) who commanded one battle for Gorkha and two battles for Kantipur against the invasion of Nuwakot.
- Kaji Sarbajit Rana Magar, Nepalese Army Chief and prominent politician, 18th century.
- Martyr Lakhan Thapa Magar (19th century), the first martyr of Nepal.
- Kaji Abhiman Singh Rana Magar, Nepalese Army Chief, 19th century. He was the first victim of Kot massacre.
- Master Mitrasen Thapa, famous Nepali folk singer, social worker, resident of Bhagsu/Dharmasala, (India).
- Giri Prasad Burathoki, only Bada Hakim from Magars, Defense Minister, Honorary Major General of Nepalese Army.
- Late Professor Jagat Bahadur Singh Burathokey, Father of Geography of Nepal.
- Narayan Singh Pun, a former cabinet minister in Nepal, former King's trusted minister & chief negotiator, pilot, helicopter Wing Commander, lieutenant colonel in the Royal Nepal Army. Also founding president of Nepal Samata Party, from Myagdi district.
- Balaram Gharti Magar, held different ministries for 11 times including Defense Minister of Nepal Government.
- Gore Bahadur Khapangi, former minister and founding leader of Prajatantrik Janamukti Party.
- Rom Bahadur Thapa, First Inspector General of Nepal Police from Magar ethnic group.
- Onsari Gharti Magar, the first female speaker of Parliament of Nepal.
- Ram Bahadur Thapa Badal, Home minister of Nepal, leader Nepal Communist Party.
- Barsaman Pun, First finance minister of Nepal from Magar community. He is from Rolpa district.
- Nanda Bahadur Pun, First vice president of federal republic Nepal, former chief commander of the People's Liberation Army
- Tham Maya Thapa, Women and Children Minister.
- Ram Kumari Jhakri, a Nepalese politician, member of parliament and former president of All Nepal National Free Students Union (ANNFSU).
- Kuber Singh Rana, Ex IGP Chief of Nepal Police from Palpa.
- Mahabir Pun, Magsaysay Award winner for extending wireless technologies in rural parts of Nepal. He is from Myagdi district.
- Dipprasad Pun, (CGC) Conspicuous Gallantry Cross Winner During War in Afghanistan.
- Tul Bahadur Pun, Honorary Lieutenant Victoria Cross Winner. Grandfather Of Dipprasad Pun. He is from Myagdi district.
- Arun Thapa, popular Nepali singer.
- Teriya Magar, Nepali dancer, winner of Dance India Dance Little Masters 2014
- Nirmal Purja, famous mountaineer and Ex-British Gurkha soldier, (SBS) special forces Royal Navy, numerous Guinness World Records holder in mountaineering. He is well-known for the Netflix documentary 14 Peaks: Nothing Is Impossible.
- Laure (Nepalese rapper) Ashish Rana Magar, a Nepalese rapper, actor and Television personality popularly known by his stage name – "Laure".
- Pramila Thapa, Taekwondo competitor in the 1992 Barcelona Olympics, black belt world champion and 10th degree black belt.
- Prem Bahadur Ale, ex-minister of Forest and Environment. Minister of Culture, Tourism and Civil Aviation

== Bibliography ==
- Acharya, Baburam, Nepalako Samkshipta Itihasa (A short history of Nepal), edited by Devi Prasad Bhandari, Purnima No. 48, Chaitra 2037 (March–April 1981), Chapter VII: Pachhillo Licchavi Rajya, (I. Sam. 642–880 Am.)
- Aryal, Jibnarayan. (2058BS). Dr Harsha Bahadur Buda Magar: Bigat ra Bartaman. Lalitpur: Dr Harsha Bahadur Budha Magar.
- Bajracharya, Dhanabajra. (2064 BS). Gopalraj Vanshawali Aitihasik Vivechana. Kirtipur: T.U.
- Bammi, Y.M. (2009). Gurkhas of the Indian Army. New Delhi: Life Span Publishers & Distributors.
- Bamzai, P. N. K. (1994). Culture and Political History of Kashmir. Vol 1. Ancient Kashmir. New Delhi: MD Publications Pvt Ltd.
- Bista, Dor Bahadur. (1972). People of Nepal. Kathmandu: Ratna Pustak Bhandar.
- Budha Magar, Harsha Bahadur. (1992)Kirat Vansha ra Magar haru. Kathmandu: Unnati Bohora.
- Cross, J.P. (1986). In Gurkhas Company. London: Arms & Armour Press Ltd.
- Gharti Magar, Balaram. (1999). Roots. Taranath Sharma (Tr.). Lalitpur: Balaram Gharti Magar.
- Hagen, Tony. (1970). Nepal the Kingdom in the Himalayas. New Delhi: Oxford & IBH Publishing Co.
- Hamilton, Francis Buchanan (1819), An Account of the Kingdom of Nepal, and the Territories Annexed to this Dominion by the House of Gorkha, A Constable
- Ministry of Defence. (1965). Nepal and the Gurkhas. London: Her Majesty's Stationery Office.
- Nepal, Gyanmani. (2040BS). Nepal Nirukta. Kathmandu: Nepal Rajakiya Pragyapratisthan.
- Northey, W. Brook & C. J. Morris. (1927). The Gurkhas Their Manners, Customs and Country. Delhi : Cosmo Publications.
- Palsokar, R.D. (1991). History of the 5th Gorkha Rifles (Frontier Force), Vol III. 1858 to 1991. Shillong: The Commandant, 58 Gorkha Training Centre.
- Rana, B. K. (2003). Sanchhipta Magar Itihas (A Concise History of Magars)
- Shaha, Rishikesh. (1975). An Introduction of Nepal. Kathmandu: Ratna Pustak Bhandar.
- Stein, M.A. (2007). Kalhana's Rajatarangini: A Chronicles of Kings of Kashmir. Vol I, II, & III (Reprint). Srinagar: Gulshan Books.
- Sufi, G.M.D. (1974). Kashir a History of Kashmir. Vol 1. New Delhi: Light & Life Publishers.
- Thapa Magar, Pradeep. (2000). Bir Haruka pani Bir Mahavir. Kathmandu: Bhaktabir Thapa Magar.
- Vansittart, Eden. (1993)(reprint). The Gurkhas. New Delhi: Anmol Publications.
- Pramod Thapa (Chief engineer at Dell international Services)
- An account Kingdom of Nepal Frances Hamilton, Rishikesh Shah,
