= Master Mitrasen =

Indian singer of Nepali folk songs (1895–1946)

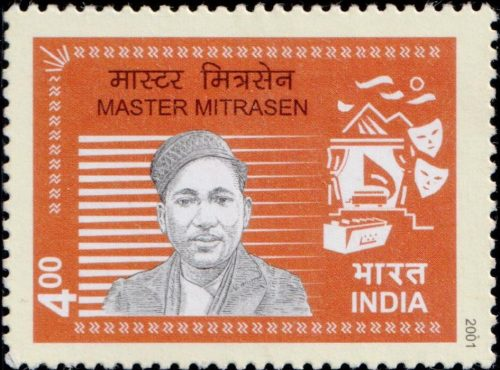
- Master Mitrasen on a 2001 stamp of India
- Born: Mitrasen Thapa Magar; 29 December 1895; Tota Rani, Punjab Province, British India (present day Himanchal Pradesh, India)
- Died: 7 April 1946 (aged 50); British India
- Occupations: Singer, poet and writer

Mitrasen Thapa Magar (29 December 1895 – 7 April 1946), popularly known as Master Mitrasen, was a singer and songwriter of Nepali folk music from Dharamshala, India. He was also a dramatist and social worker. Leaving the Indian Army in early age for the upliftment of Nepali music, his contribution to different fields of Indian Gorkha and Nepalese society is remarkable.

== Early life ==
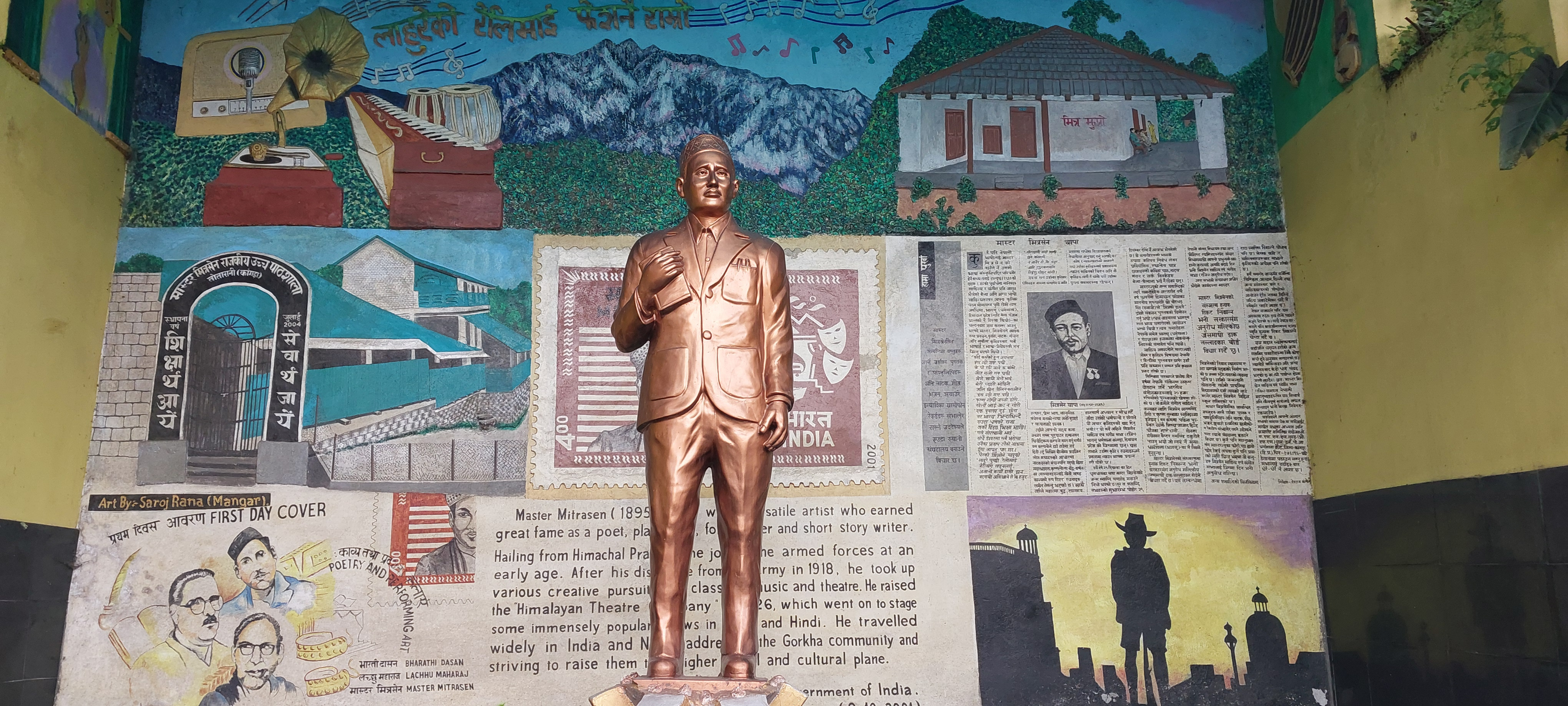
Statue of Mitrasen Thapa in Darjeeling

He was born in Bhagsu Cantonment, India on 29 December 1895 to father Manbirsen Thapa Magar and mother Radha Thapa Magar. His grand father was Surendrasen Thapa. His ancestral home was in Rakhu Pula village in Parbat District of Nepal. He had a son named Digvijay Sen Thapa.

=== Education ===
Since there was no school around Bhagsu Cantonment, during his time, he started learning from his father initially. He joined his first grade at his 8 years of age at a primary school five miles away from his residence. He learned the Ramayana translated by Bhanubhakta from his father.

=== Military service ===
When he became 16 years old, he joined 1/1 Gorkha Rifles as a recruit. His forefathers had served in same unit before. He took part in World War I with his battalion in France in 1914. He left military service in 1920. His interest was to be social worker and devote his rest of life for betterment of Nepalese music and society.

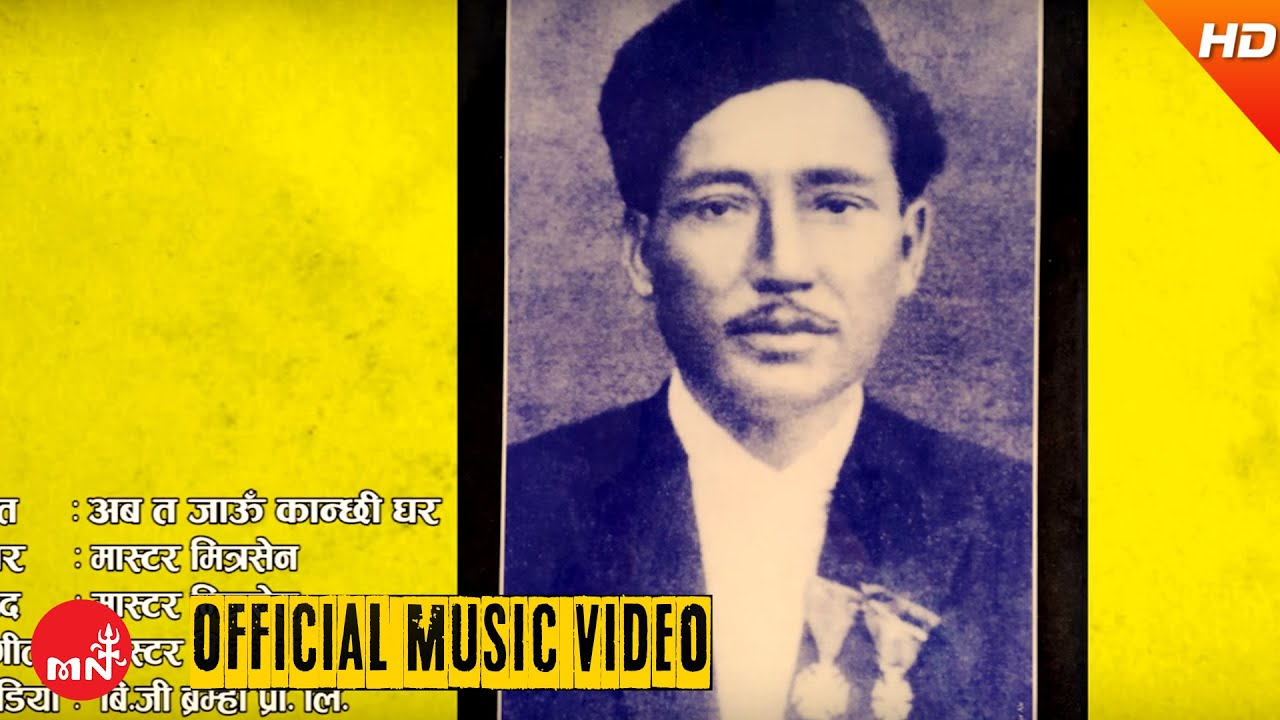
Master Mitrasen Thapa's song.

== Music contributions ==
"Lahure Ko Relimai"
Magar's famous song Lahure Ko Relimai

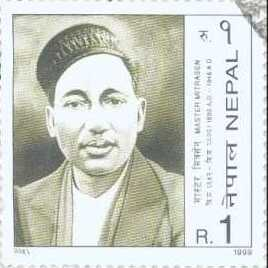
Master Mitrasen on a 1999 post stamp of Nepal.

He travelled different parts of India as well as Nepal where Nepalese people lived with his harmonium. His folk songs became very popular among Nepalese people. Some of these popular songs are: Lahure ko relimai fashainai ramro..., Dhaan ko baalaa jhulyo hajur dashain ramailo, Malai khutrukkai paryo jethan timro bahini le.... etc. He recorded 24 disk record or 97 songs in nepali music. He was not only singer, he equally contributed in the field of drama, story, novel, essay, poems etc.

For his contribution in Nepali society and music, India and Nepal governments have already published mailing tickets with his photographs. There is also Mitrasen Academy to promote Nepali music and society to follow and remember his legacy. His contributions made him as a Master Mitrasen and remained immortal.

== Cited sources ==
- Harsha Bahadur Budha Magar (1999) Master Mitrasen Thapa Magar. Kathmandu: Pushpavati Budha Magar
