= Gore Bahadur Khapangi =

Nepalese politician (1940–2016)

- गोरेबहादुर खपाङ्गी
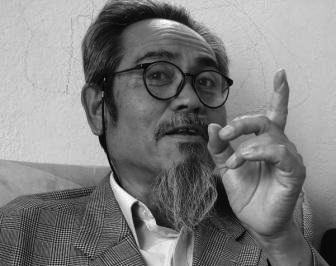
- Born: Ramnagar, Mahottari, Nepal
- Died: 2016-08-27; Neuro Hospital, Kathmandu
- Political party: Rastriya Janamukti Party
- Spouse: Bidya khapangi Magar
- Children: 4

Gore Bahadur Khapangi Magar (Nepali: गोरेबहादुर खपांगी) (1940–2016) was former minister and founding leader of Prajatantrik Janamukti Party of Nepal.

He belonged to Magars community. He was born in Mahottari District of Nepal. He completed his master's degree in English from Kathmandu, Nepal. His health was in serious condition after he was hit by a motorbike in Kathmandu.

Khapangi had served as the Minister for Women, Children and Social Welfare in the government led by the then Prime Minister Lokendra Bahadur Chand. He died on 27 August 2016 while undergoing treatment at the Neuro Hospital in Bansbari of Kathmandu. He was 70 years old.
