= Bima, Nepal =

Bima, Nepal बिम
- Village development committee
- Location in Nepal Bima, Nepal (Nepal)
- Coordinates: 28.45°N 83.41°E
- Country: Nepal
- Zone: Dhaulagiri Zone
- District: Myagdi District

Population (1991)
  - Total: 1,685
- Time zone: UTC+5:45 (Nepal Time)

Bima, Nepal is a village development committee in Myagdi District in the Dhaulagiri Zone of western-central Nepal. At the time of the 1991 Nepal census it had a population of 1685 people living in 339 individual households.

== Notable residents ==
- Dipprasad Pun CGC, Nepalese sergeant of the Royal Gurkha Rifles
