= Giri Prasad Burathoki =

Nepali politician

Sardar Bahadur Giri Prasad Burathoki OGDB, OTSP, MBE, MC, OBI
- Burathoki in uniform as an honorary major general of the Royal Nepal Army, wearing Nepali honours and British military decorations.
- Born: 1898; Bharse, Gulmi District, Nepal
- Died: 1981 (aged 82–83)
- Military career
- Allegiance: British India; India; Nepal
- Branch: British Indian Army; Indian Army; Nepal Army
- Rank: Honorary Major General, Royal Nepal Army; Subedar-Major and Honorary Captain, Indian Army
- Service number: 4838
- Unit: 5th Royal Gurkha Rifles (Frontier Force)
- Conflicts: World War I World War II
- Awards: Order of Tri Shakti Patta Class I Order of Gorkha Dakshina Bahu Class I Member of the Order of the British Empire; Military Cross; Order of British India
- Other work: Minister of Defence, His Majesty's Government of Nepal; Minister for the portfolios of Agriculture, Food, Forest, Health, Industry and Commerce; District Governor, Gulmi district Treasurer, Nepal Ex-Servicemen's Organisation

Giri Prasad Burathoki (1898 – 1981) was an officer in the British Indian Army and later a Nepalese politician. He is noted for serving as the first Defence Minister of Nepal.

== Early life and military service ==
He was born in 1898 at Bharse, Gulmi District, Nepal. He left his village at a young age to join the British Indian Army and was involved in World War I and World War II. His surname is also spelled as 'Budathoki' and 'Budhathoki'.

=== Military Service ===
Burathoki served as a non-commissioned officer in the 5th Royal Gurkha Rifles (Frontier Force). His service number was 4838.

Burathoki showed great bravery and distinguished service during his military career with the British. For his service, he was conferred the title of "Sardar Bahadur", was awarded the Military Cross, and was appointed to the Order of British Empire and the Order of British India. He retired as a Subedar Major, and was made an Honorary Captain.

His appointment as a Member of the Order of the British Empire was published in The London Gazette on 19 October 1944.

=== Views on the British Indian Army and the Ranas ===
Burathoki expressed some criticism of both the British Indian Army and of the Rana regime in Nepal. He said that his British commanding officers in Burma, while loving and caring, kept the Gurkhas on a tight leash, did not allow them to mix with Indian soldiers, and allowed only shaven heads (with a 'chutia') and minimal education among the soldiers. The Ranas, he said, had been oppressive at home, i.e., in Nepal.

=== Post-retirement ===
Once he returned to Nepal, he served as the Treasurer to the Nepal Ex-Servicemen's Organisation. He was a pensioner of the Indian Army.

== Return to Nepal and roles in Nepalese politics ==
On his return home, Burathoki was made the District Commissioner of Gulmi District from 1951 to 1956. He was the only "Bada Hakim" (a powerful district governor position instituted during the Rana rule in Nepal) from the Magar community. Thereafter, he was elected as a Member of Parliament from Gulmi District in 1959 and also served the first Speaker of the House. The House was dissolved by King Mahendra, but he was later nominated to the National Panchayat and made an Assistant Minister.

=== Minister in the Nepal government ===
Burathoki won successive elections and served as the first Defense Minister of Nepal for nearly a decade, during King Mahendra's reign. In the aftermath of the 1962 Sino-Indian War in the Himalayas, Indo-Nepal relations became strained. Burathoki visited India in a process to ease these tensions. In November 1966, King Mahendra sent Burathoki to New Delhi for securing armaments from India. Besides, during this visit he made courtesy calls on the Indian President S. Radhakrishnan and Prime Minister Indira Gandhi on November 6, 1966. In Kathmandu, as Defence Minister, Burathoki likewise received courtesy calls, visits, and invitations to events in the city from ministers and diplomatic officers from several countries, including China, the United States, and the United Kingdom.

As Minister, at certain points of time, he also held the portfolios of Forest, Agriculture, Food, Industry and Commerce. In the early 1960s he had also served as an Assistant Minister for Health.

=== Nepalese honours ===
For his service to the nation, Burathoki was conferred the medals of the Order of Tri Shakti Patta Class I and Order of Gorkha Dakshina Bahu Class I by Nepal's erstwhile royal government. He was also conferred the title of Honorary Major General of the Nepal Army.

== Children and later life ==
Burathoki's elder son, late Colonel Shri Prasad Burathoki also joined the British Indian Army and later the Indian Army and after his retirement served as Tourism Minister for the Nepal Government. His younger son, Major General Nara Bahadur Burathoki, who was the first Magar Major General of Nepalese Army after the fall of the Rana dynasty, retired from the Nepal Army after a long distinguished service.

He died in 1981.
