= Kaura (dance) =

Folk musical performance, Nepal

Kauda/chudka
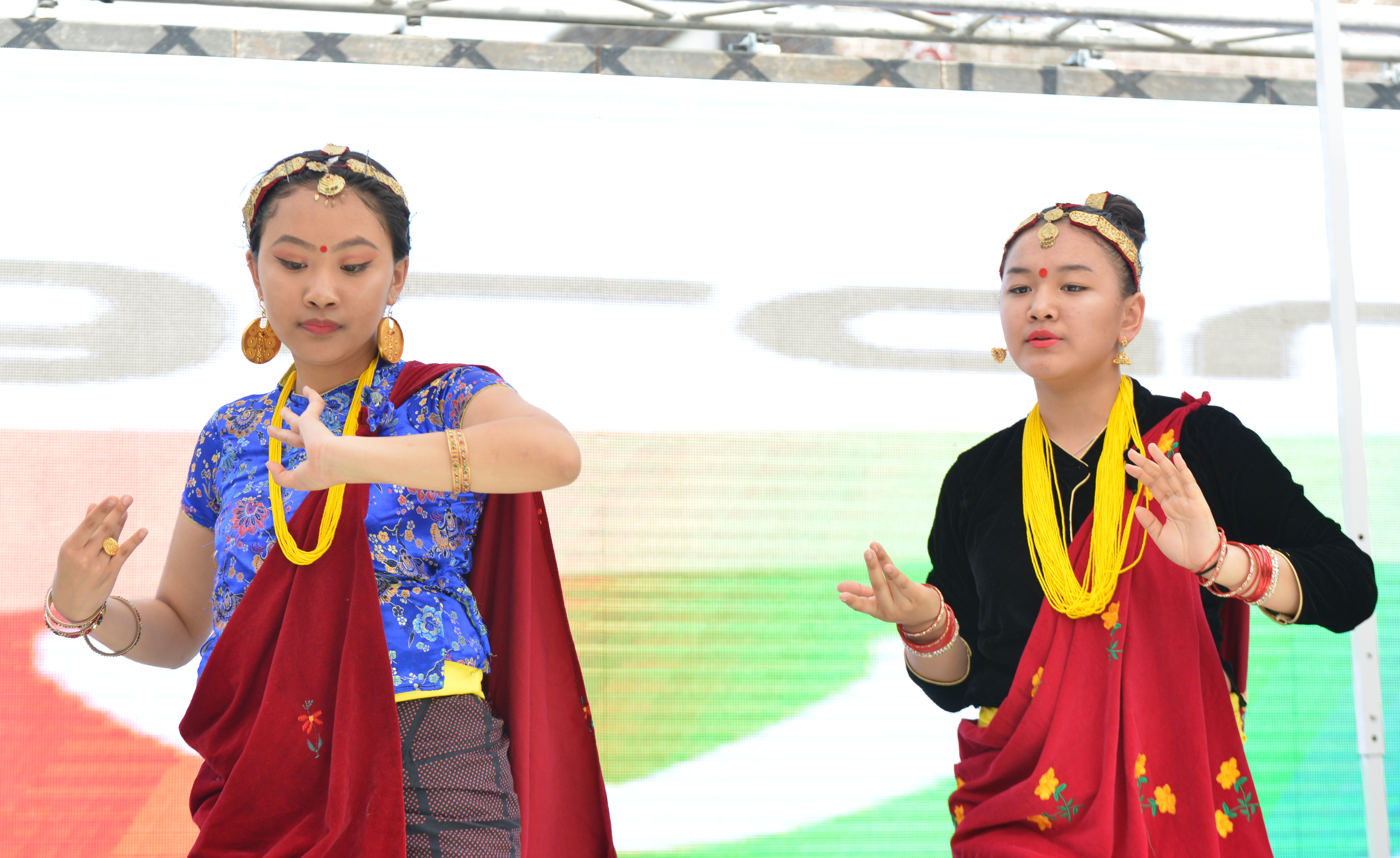
- Kauda/Chudka dance performance at Everest Day New York 2019
- Native name: कौडा/ चुड्का
- Genre: Nepalese folk dance
- Inventor: Gurung/Magar
- Origin: Tanahu, Western Nepal

Kaura, also known as Kauda and Chudka, is a folk musical performance indigenous to the Western hilly regions of Nepal mostly famous among Gurung, Magar, Dura, Darai, Kumal. Kauda was believed to be developed in Rodhi Culture system.

- Kauda/Chudka song.

The Kauda is a traditional dance form, originated in Western part of Nepal where community like Gurung, Magar, Dura, Darai, Kumal resides. It typically involves rhythmic movements accompanied by traditional music, often performed during festivals or cultural celebrations to showcase the community's heritage and identity.

== See also ==
- Maruni
- Deuda
