= Tota Rani =

Coordinates: 32°15′N 76°19′E

Tota Rani is a small village near Dal Lake in Kangra district, Himachal Pradesh, India. It has a very long history of settlement by Nepali people. Thapa and Gurung culture are mixed here and now the Nepali culture almost vanished and people mingle with local Himachali people, Gaddis.
