= Mahakali Lake =

Lake in Himachal Pradesh, India

- Location within Himachal Pradesh Location within India
- Location: chura, Chamba district
- Coordinates: 32°52′21″N 76°20′02″E
- Type: High altitude lake
- Basin countries: India
- Surface elevation: 4,080 m (13,390 ft)
- References: Himachal Pradesh Tourism Dep.

Mahakali Lake is a high altitude lake which lies between Sano and Gudial villages of Chamba district in Himachal Pradesh, India. It is about 4,080 metres (13,390 ft) above the sea level. This lake remains frozen for 6 months from November to April.

== History ==
Lake is considered sacred to Goddess Mahakali. Nearby Ghadhasaru Lake has a small temple of Goddess Kali.
