= Dipprasad Pun =

Nepalese Gurkha soldier

Dipprasad Pun CGC
- Born: 1979 or 1980 (age 46–47); Bima, Nepal
- Spouse: Shobha Pun
- Military career
- Allegiance: United Kingdom
- Branch: British Army
- Service years: 15+
- Rank: Sergeant
- Unit: 1st Battalion, The Royal Gurkha Rifles
- Conflicts: War in Afghanistan
- Awards: Conspicuous Gallantry Cross

Dipprasad Pun, CGC (Nepali: दिपप्रसाद पुन, born 1979 or 1980) is a Nepalese sergeant of the Royal Gurkha Rifles (British Army), who was decorated with the Conspicuous Gallantry Cross for an act of bravery during the War in Afghanistan on the night of 17 September 2010. Sergeant Pun, an acting sergeant, single-handedly repelled a force of 12 to 30 Taliban insurgents who were attacking his patrol base near Babaji in Helmand province.

== Conspicuous Gallantry Cross ==
Immediately prior to the engagement, Pun, who was with the 1st battalion Royal Gurkha Rifles, was on sentry duty at a checkpoint guarding his unit's compound. Taliban fighters were attempting to plant an IED near the compound gate under the cover of darkness, when they surrounded and attacked his post with AK-47s and RPGs. Believing he was about to die, he decided to kill as many of the enemy as possible. Over the course of the engagement, Acting Sergeant Pun fired 250 rounds from his machine gun, 180 from his rifle, used 17 hand grenades and a Claymore mine, before beating the last fighter to death with the tripod of his machine gun.

Upon receiving the award, Pun said that he had no choice but to fight, as the Taliban had surrounded his checkpoint, and that he was alone. Pun prevented his post from being overrun, saving the lives of three of his comrades. His actions are cited as "the bravest seen in his battalion during two tours".

=== Citation ===
On the evening of the day in question [17 September 2010], Sergeant Pun was one of four men left in the southern compound because the platoon had pushed out a patrol to dominate the road to the east in readiness for the next day’s parliamentary elections. All were taking turns to man a single sangar position on the roof in the centre of the compound.

Sergeant Pun was on duty when he heard a clinking noise to the south of the checkpoint:

"I thought at first maybe it was a cow," he said, "but my suspicions soon built up, and I saw Taliban digging to lay down an IED in front of our gate".

Sergeant Pun had the presence of mind to gather up two radios, which would enable him to both speak to his commander and to call in artillery support, his personal weapon, and a general-purpose machine gun.

Realising that he was about to be attacked, he quickly informed his commander on one of the radios and launched a grenade at the enemy. Sergeant Pun single-handedly fought off an enemy attack on his lightly manned position. In the dark he tackled the enemy head-on as he moved around his position to fend off the attack from three sides, killing three assailants and causing the others to flee.

In doing so he saved the lives of his three comrades and prevented the position from being overrun. Sergeant Pun couldn’t know how many Taliban were attempting to overcome his position, but he sought them out from all angles despite the danger, consistently moving towards them to reach the best position of attack:

"I thought there might have been around 20 to 30, but later locals told me it was probably about 15. The firing went on continually for about 17 minutes", said Sergeant Pun.

"At first I was a bit scared, and I thought definitely they are going to kill me. But as soon as I started firing, that feeling went away".

— Ministry of Defence, Pun's Conspicuous Gallantry Cross Citation,
