= Dashair Lake =

Lake in Himachal Pradesh, India

Dashair
- Location within Himachal Pradesh Location within India
- Location: Kullu with Lahaul district
- Coordinates: 32°22′30″N 77°13′26″E
- Type: High altitude lake
- Basin countries: India
- Surface elevation: 4,270 m (14,010 ft)

Dashair Lake is located near the Rohtang Pass that connects Kullu district with Lahaul in the state of Himachal Pradesh, India. It is about 4,270 metres (14,010 ft) above the sea level and it is also known as Sarkund.
