= Chander Naun =

Lake in Himachal Pradesh, India

Chandar Nahan
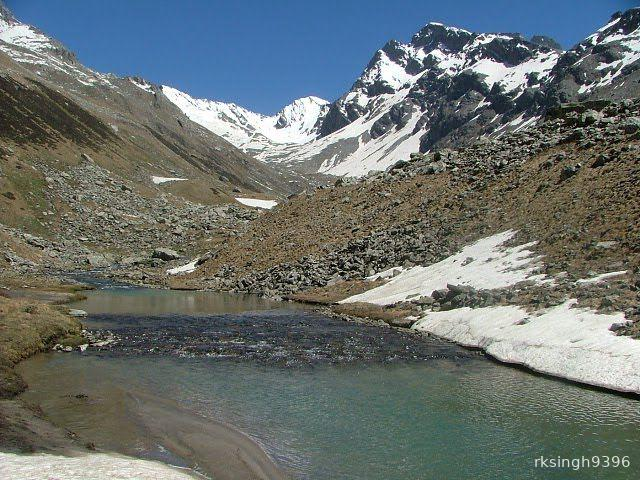

- Location within Himachal Pradesh Location within India
- Location: Shimla district (Rohru)
- Coordinates: 31.3667°N 78.1°E
- Lake type: High altitude lake
- Primary inflows: Glacier and snow melt
- Primary outflows: Pabbar River
- Basin countries: India
- Surface elevation: 4,260 m (13,980 ft)
- References: Himachal Pradesh Tourism Dep.

Chandar Nahan is a high altitude lake which is located in Rohru tehsil of Shimla district in Himachal Pradesh, India at an elevation of about 4,260 m (13,980 ft) above sea level. It is surrounded by snow for a long time and is the source of the river Pabbar.
