= Bharse =

Bharse भर्से
- Village Development Committee
- Location in Nepal
- Coordinates: 28.07°N 83.46°E
- Country: Nepal
- Zone: Lumbini Zone
- District: Gulmi District

Population (2011)
  - Total: 1,621
- Time zone: UTC+5:45 (Nepal Time)

Bharse is a village and municipality in Gulmi District in the Lumbini Zone of central Nepal. At the time of the 2011 Nepal census it had a population of 1621 people living in 420 individual households. It has contributed many personnels for the British and Indian army.

The village is home to many places of interest in Gulmi district

1. Jholethem Devi Temple
2. Bharse Deurali Buddha Stupa
3. Bharse ex-servicemen gallery
