= Dehnasar Lake =

Lake in Himachal Pradesh, India

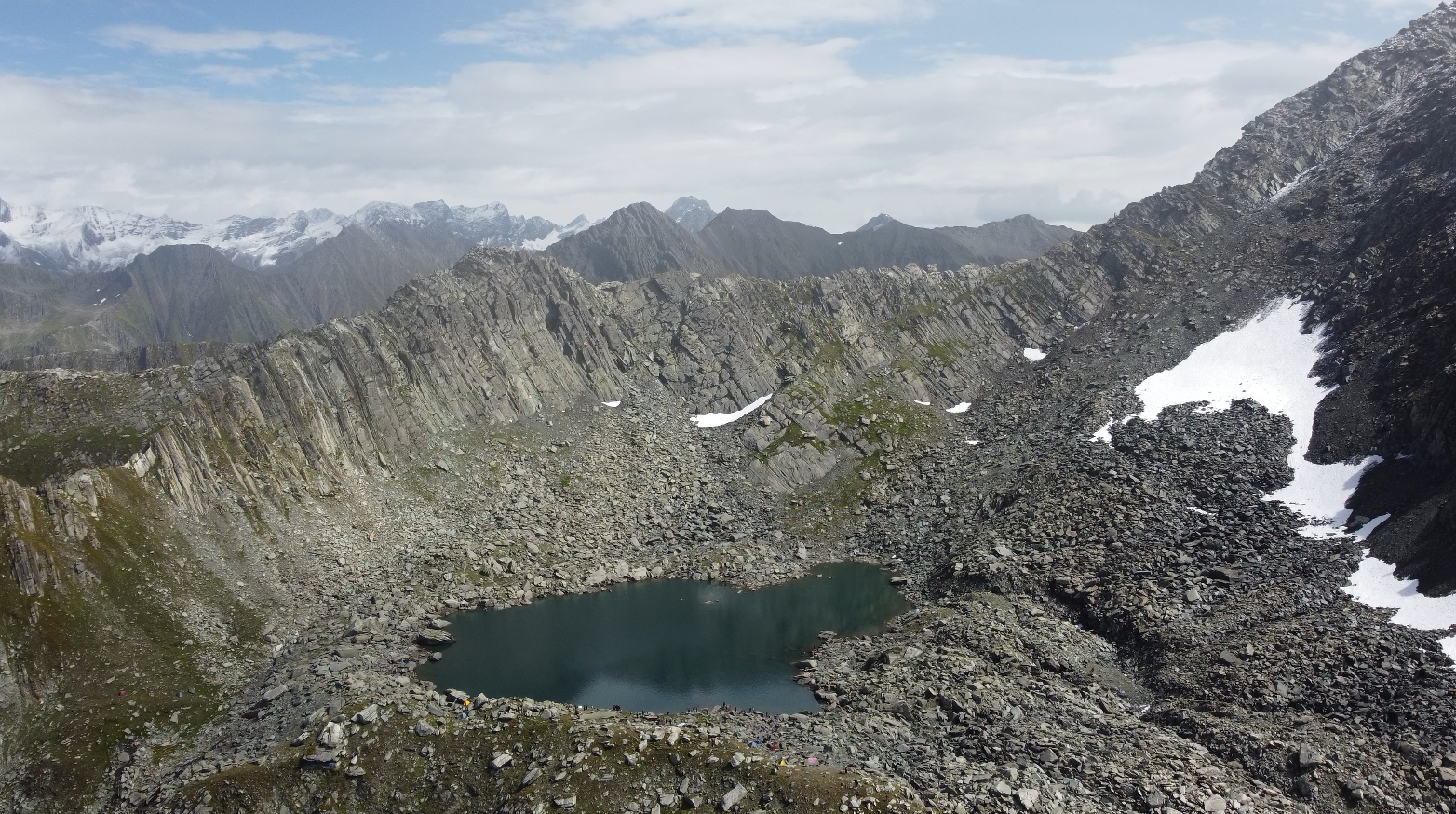

- Location within Himachal Pradesh Location within India
- Location: Barot Valley
- Coordinates: 32.1°N 76.93°E
- Lake type: Glacial-fed
- Primary inflows: Snow
- Catchment area: Barot Valley
- Basin countries: India
- Max. length: 300 m (980 ft)
- Max. width: 200 m (660 ft)
- Surface area: 50,000 m^{2} (540,000 sq ft)
- Max. depth: 5 m (16 ft)
- Surface elevation: 4,280 m (14,040 ft)
- Frozen: Winter
- Settlements: Joginder Nagar, Kullu

Dehnasar Lake is a high-altitude freshwater lake lying in the Kangra District of Himachal Pradesh, India in Barot Valley (near Joginder Nagar and Kullu towns). This is a concurrent place for Kullu, Kangra and Mandi and people gather on 20th of Bhadrapada for the holy bath (mostly during the last week of August or first week of September). It is revered both for its natural beauty and religious significance. Surrounded by rocky ridges, alpine meadows, and seasonal snowfields, the lake attracts trekkers, pilgrims, and nature enthusiasts, particularly during the short summer window (June to September) when the trail becomes accessible. The lake was inspected by the District Administration team led by DC Kangra in September 2026 and declared safe from any immediate threat.

== Geography ==
Dehnasar Lake lies at 4,280 metres (14,040 ft) above mean sea level, in Barot Valley region of Kangra district in Dhauladhar ranges. Although it is in Kangra District it is more approachable from Mandi and Kullu districts.

The lake is situated beside rocky cliffs at the top of the mountain and derives its water from melted snow. It lies frozen under a thick coat of snow during winters. The ridgeline that runs behind the lake is 4,600 metres (15,100 ft) tall at its highest point.

=== Climate ===
The lake falls under the alpine tundra climate, classified as ET (Tundra Climate) in the Köppen climate classification system. The temperatures vary around −5 to 15 °C (23 to 59 °F) during summers and monsoon season (May to September), and 10 to −25 °C (50 to −13 °F) in winters (October to April). The area around the lake gets covered under thick layers of snow, sometimes 3 to 6 metres (9.8 to 19.7 ft) in the winters when the blizzards are common. The snow starts melting around the April end and clears out at the end of June. It can snow throughout the year but snowfall during July or August is rare.

== Accessibility ==
The trek to the lake is moderately difficult and typically begins from the village of Polling (2200 meters), 8 kilometres (5.0 mi) from Barot towards east.

Trek Distance: 14 km (8.7 mi) (one way) from the Polling village which is accessible via road from Barot.

Trekking Season: June or September is the ideal window, when snow has melted and weather is stable. One should avoid trekking in July and August due to chances of heavy rainfall, landslides and sometimes cloudbursts which can damage the trail temporarily.

Nearest Towns: Jogindernagar (around 45 km (28 mi) by road) and Bir Billing (60 km (37 mi)).

Alternatively, people trek from Lug Valley of Kullu near Tayun village (2,600 m (8,500 ft)) north-westwards for almost the same distance. Another alternative is to trek from a lengthy trail that originates from Thaltukhod village near Tikken in Barot Valley. It takes 2-3 days from this gradual but lengthy trek along the Fungni ridgeline that divides Barot and Lug Valleys.

Accommodation: Options are limited as most visitors camp on their own or return the same day. Although trekkers or pilgrims are advised to plan for 2 days at least with a halt at one camping site midway at 3,300 m (10,800 ft) on a ridgeline when trekking from the Polling village.

The paths involves steep ascents, crossing mountain ridges, glacial streams, and high-altitude grasslands, making it suitable for experienced trekkers or guided groups.

== Mythology or Spiritual Significance ==
Dehnasar Lake holds religious significance, especially for the Gaddi community and local Hindu devotees. It is believed that the lake is sacred to Lord Shiva, and many locals consider it a place of spiritual purification. According to oral traditions, taking a holy dip in the lake during the Bhadrapada month (August–September) is said to cleanse one of sins and bring blessings.

According to a local folkfare Lord Shiva visited the lake while killing an evil witch (or Dayan in local language) who used to reside near the lake and torment the locals, stealing their food and killing people. Locals prayed and invoked Lord Shiva for protection. And as he killed the witch and hence the name Dehnasar (Dehna meaning witch, and sar meaning a lake).

The lake is believed to be protected by spiritual entities, and offerings such as meat or alcohol near the site are traditionally discouraged. The Brahma Kamal, a rare and sacred Himalayan flower, is sometimes spotted near the lake.

== Ecology ==
=== Flora ===
The location supports a sparse but ecologically significant range of alpine vegetation. Due to the extreme altitude, cold temperatures, and short growing season, the flora around the lake is limited to hardy species adapted to harsh conditions. The area is primarily home to alpine herbs and grasses such as Primula, Potentilla, Anaphalis, and Saussurea, which thrive in the high-altitude meadows surrounding the lake. One of the most notable plants occasionally found near the lake is the rare and sacred Brahma Kamal (Saussurea obvallata), which blooms briefly during the summer and holds spiritual significance in Himalayan culture. Mosses and lichens grow abundantly on rocks and soil patches, playing a vital role in this fragile ecosystem. During the brief summer months of July and August, seasonal wildflowers add bursts of color to the landscape, with small, low-lying plants adapted to resist wind, frost, and high UV radiation.

=== Fauna ===
The fauna around Dehnasar Lake is sparse but adapted to its harsh high-altitude environment. Commonly observed species include the agile Himalayan tahr, occasionally seen grazing on rocky slopes. Red foxes and Himalayan weasels may also be spotted, though they are elusive. Birdlife is more prominent, with species like the Himalayan griffon vulture, lammergeier (bearded vulture), snow pigeon, and alpine chough frequently seen gliding above the ridges. Insects such as alpine butterflies and bees appear briefly during the short summer bloom. Reptiles and amphibians are virtually absent due to the extreme cold and elevation.

== Shepherd Life and Seasonal Migration ==
During the summer months, shepherds, particularly from the Gaddi community, migrate to the high-altitude meadows around Dehnasar Lake with their flocks of sheep and goats. These pastoralists rely on the rich alpine grasslands for seasonal grazing. The lake and surrounding area hold spiritual significance for many shepherds, who often consider it sacred and follow traditional customs while camping nearby. As winter approaches, they descend to lower altitudes to escape the extreme cold and snow. Their seasonal presence contributes to the cultural and ecological landscape of the region.

== Gallery ==
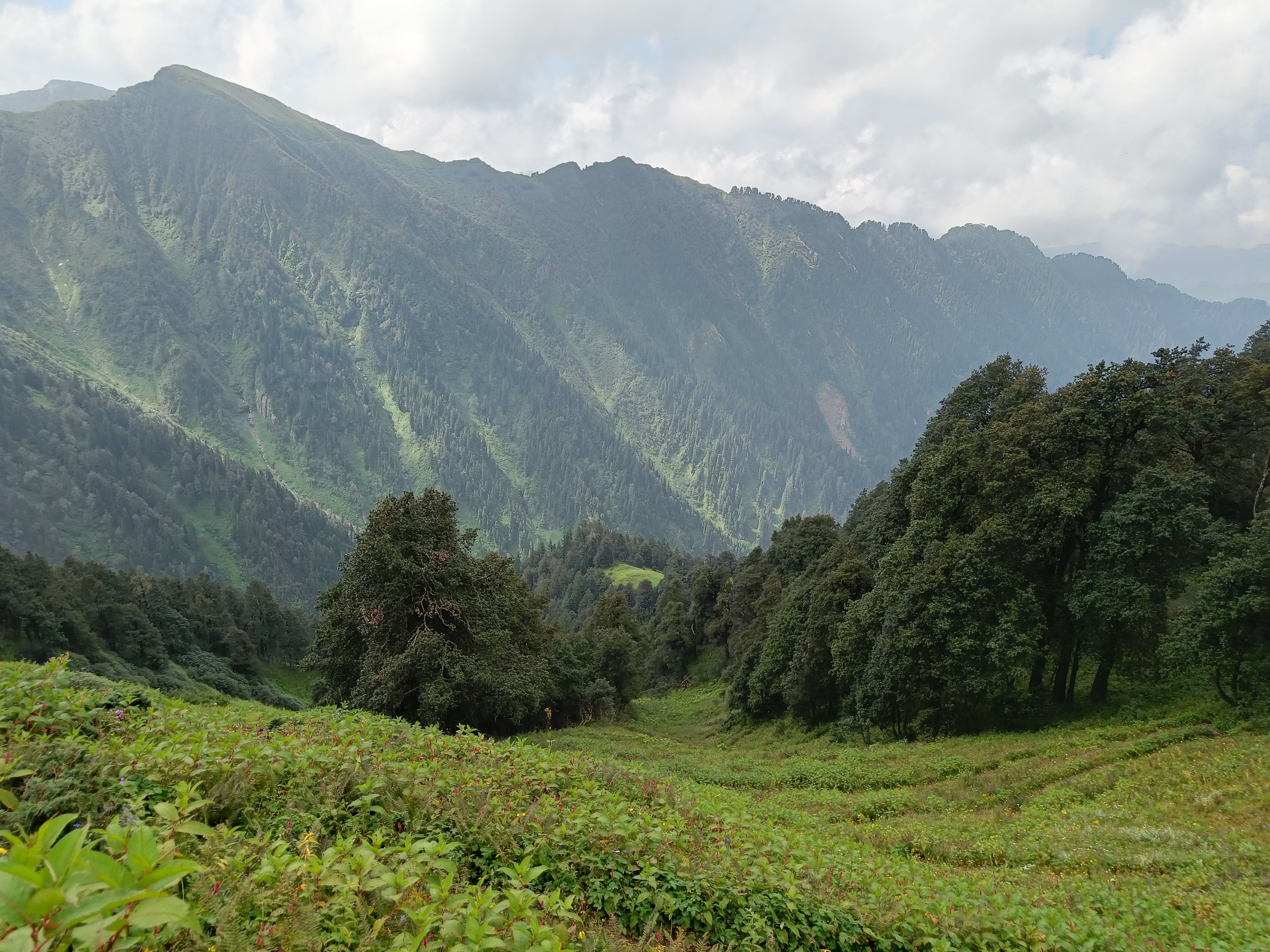
Treeline at Dehnasar Trek ends above 3500 meters

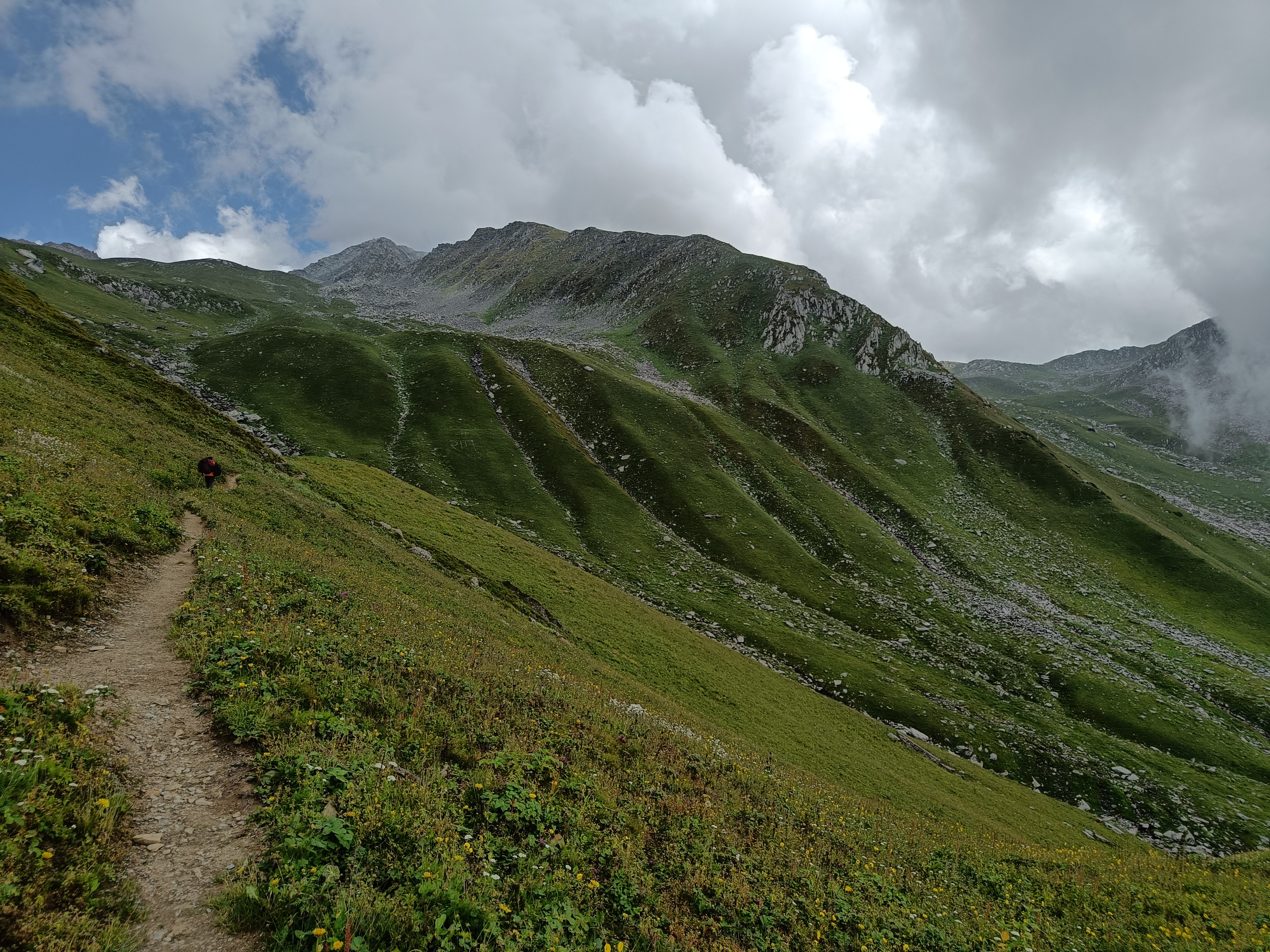
Dehnasar trail and the monsoon blossom at around 3700 meters

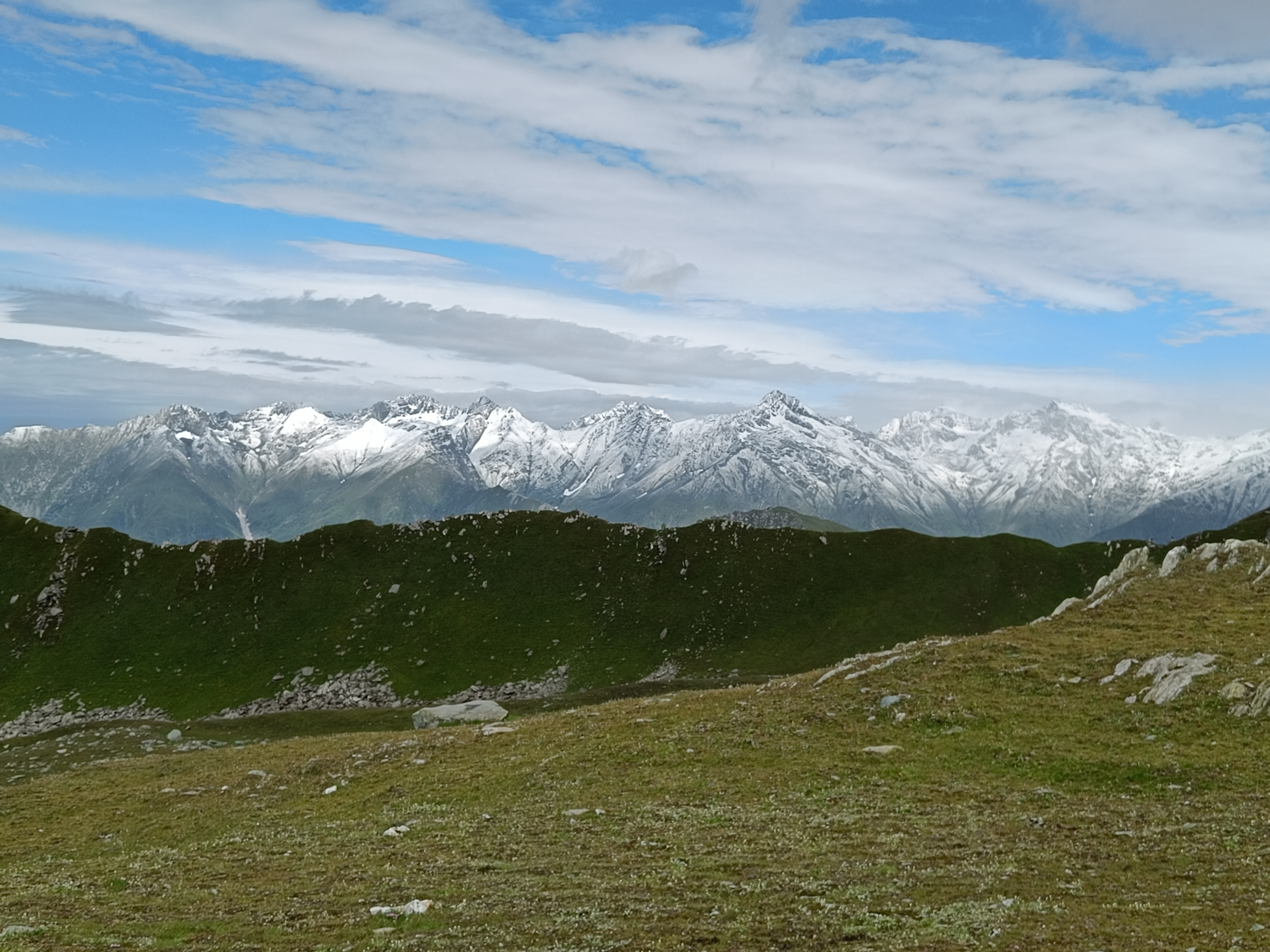
Fresh snowfall on the adjacent mountains in early September

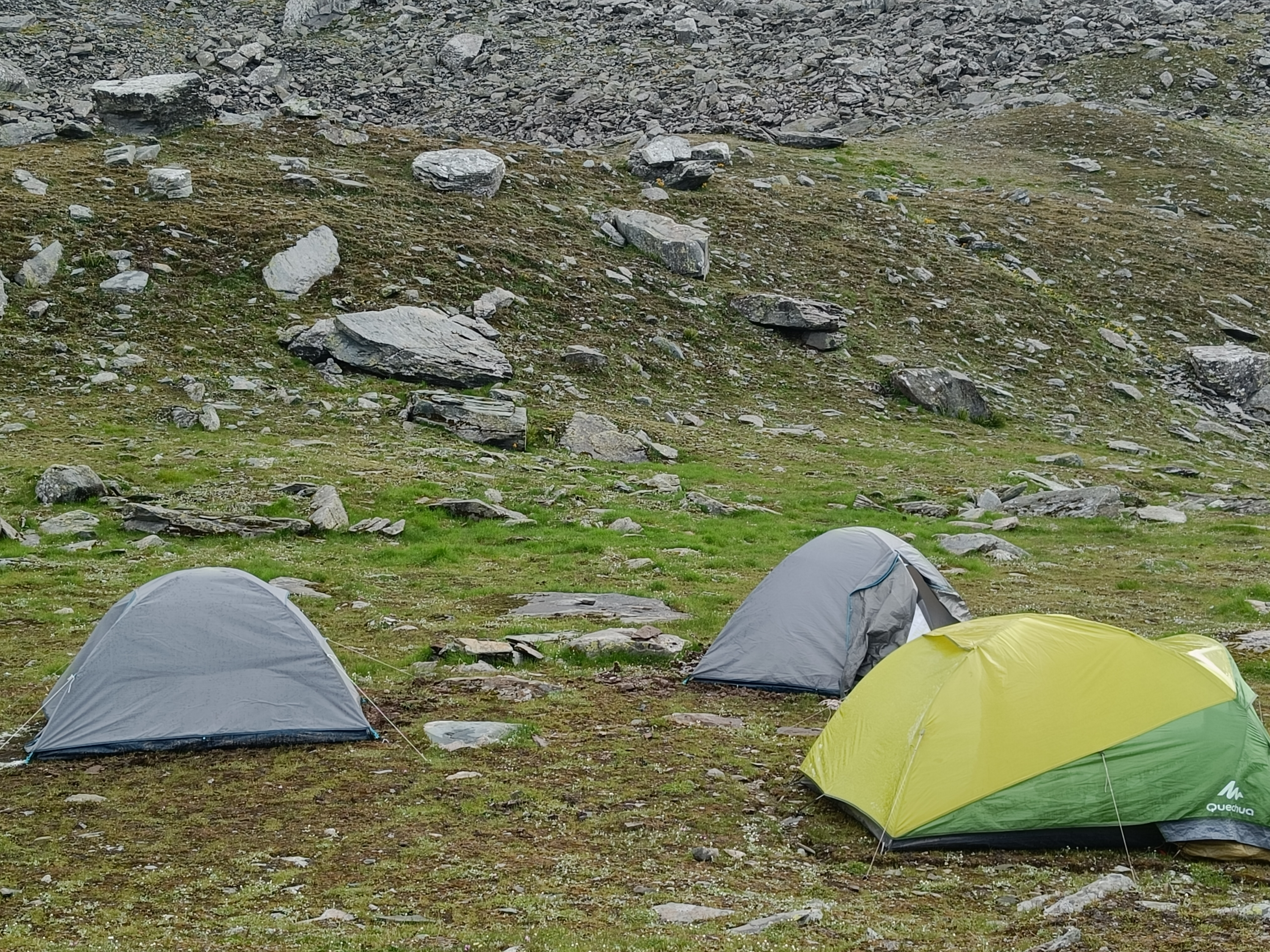
Tents pitched just 100 meters below the lake on September 5, 2023

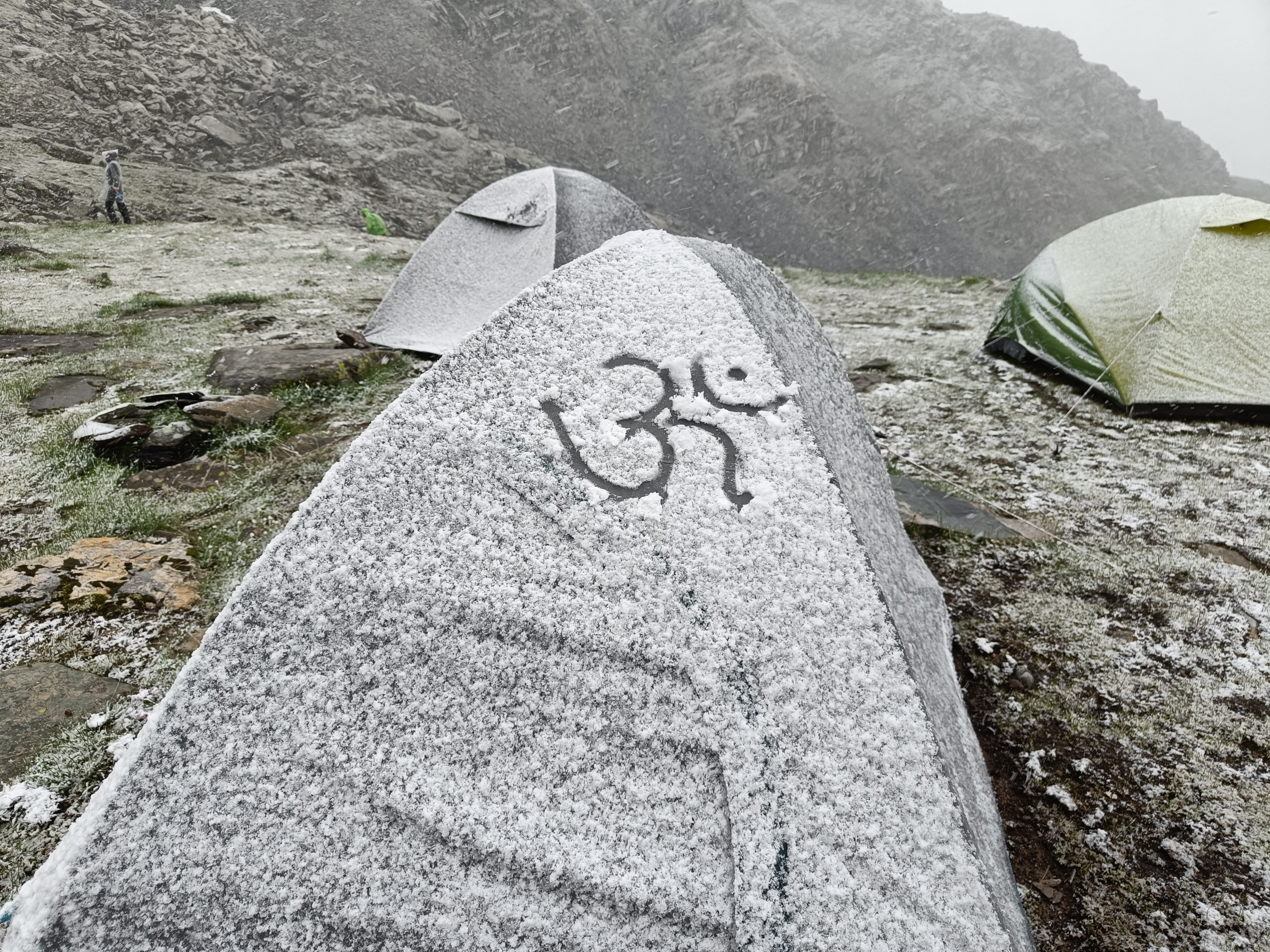
Snowfall on September 5, 2023 during pilgrimage

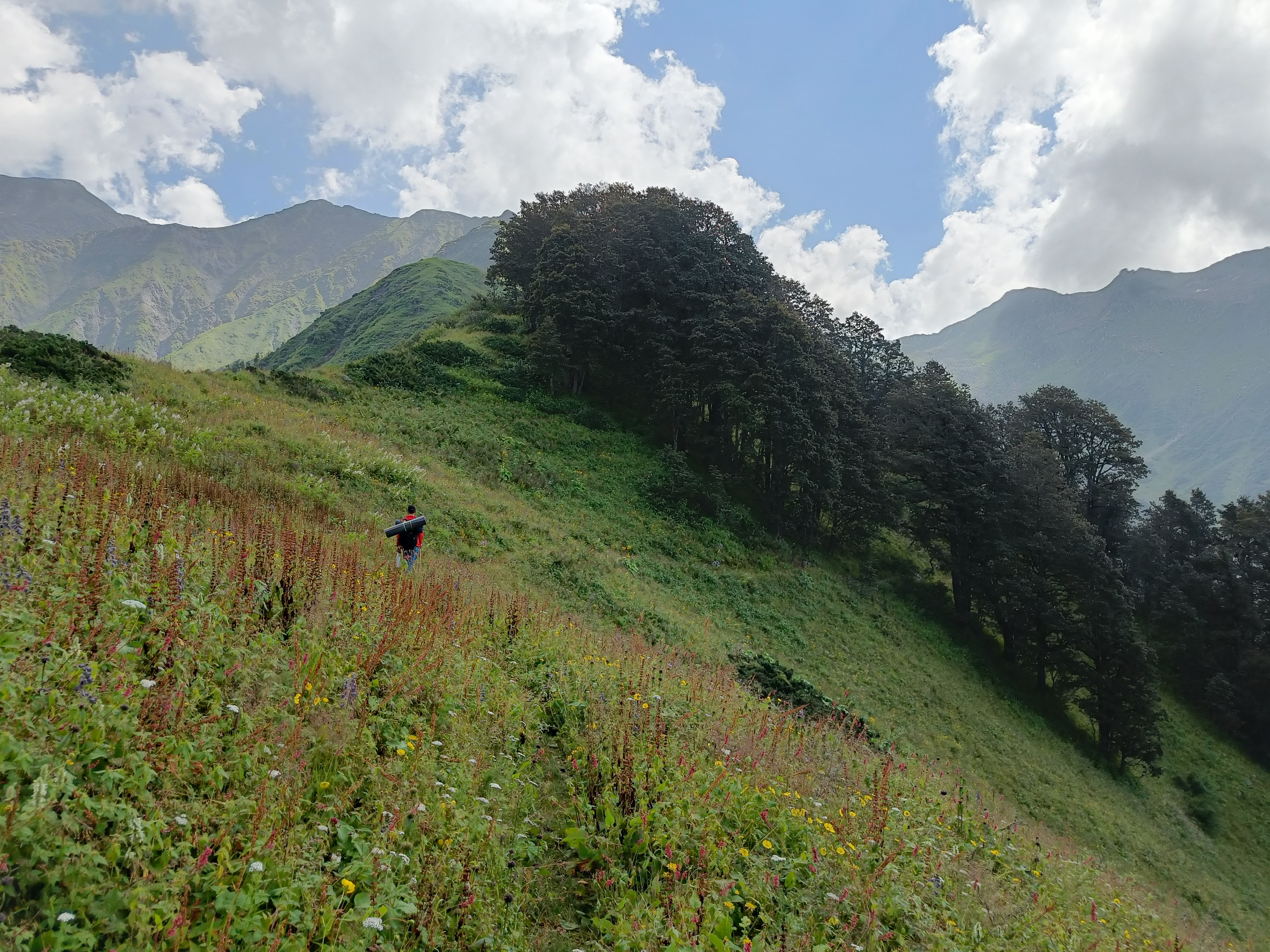
A trekker walking towards the lake

== See Also ==
- Barot Valley
- Joginder Nagar
- Bir Billing
- Thamsar Pass
