= Prajatantrik Janamukti Party =

Prajatantrik Janamukti Party प्रजातान्त्रिक जनमुक्ति पार्टी
- President: Gore Bahadur Khapangi

Election symbol

Prajatantrik Janamukti Party is a political party in Nepal, led by Gore Bahadur Khapangi (the founding general secretary of the Rastriya Janamukti Party). The party is registered with the Election Commission of Nepal ahead of the 2008 Constituent Assembly election.

The party seeks to establish a system of proportional representation based on ethnicity.
