= Dal Lake (Himachal Pradesh) =

Lake in Himachal Pradesh, India

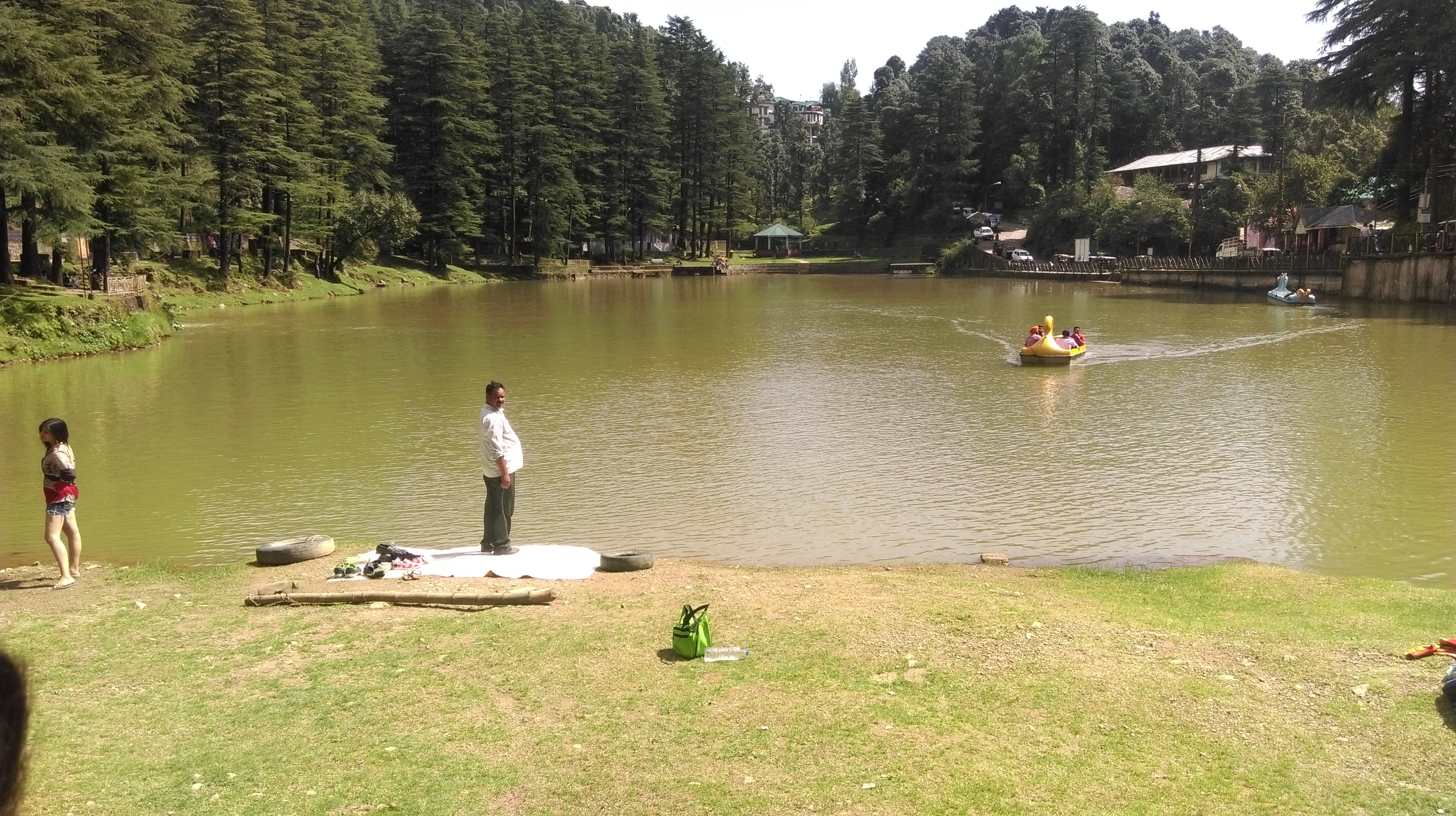

- Location within Himachal Pradesh
- Location: Kangra district Village Tota Rani
- Coordinates: 32.247148°N 76.310719°E
- Type: Mid altitude lake
- Basin countries: India
- Surface elevation: 1,775 m (5,823 ft)
- References: Himachal Pradesh Tourism Dep.

Dal Lake is a small mid-altitude lake (1,775 m above sea level) near the village of Tota Rani in Kangra district of Himachal Pradesh state in northern India.

The word Dal means 'lake' in several languages of the western Himalayas. The lake is surrounded by deodar trees and is considered to be a sacred spot as there is small Shiva Temple (shrine) on its bank. There are different kinds of fish that live in this lake. The lake has greenish water. This lake is situated near Rikkarmar on Balan Dhar. There is also a temple dedicated to 'Lord Driveshwar' built by sage Agastya. This lake may be referred to as "Bhagsunag Lake" but it is mainly referred to as Dal Lake by the locals. Bhagsunag is the name of a village which is given to this lake because of its close proximity to the lake.

== Etymology ==
Durvasa Rishi had come here from Maharashtra to cool his right side. Pointing to a slab of stone, she [shri Mataji] said Durvasa Rishi had done tapasya on this shila (stone slab) and that is why the city was called Dharam shila ( धर्म शिला ), but the British pronounced it as Dharamshala! (Originally this area was named after Durvasa ( दुर्वासा ) Rishi as Durveshwar ( दुर्वेश्वर ). The British changed it to Dal Lake.

— Yogi Mahajan, The Tenth Incarnation, Paperback, in Volume I, Chapter 14, page 89

- Dharam shila ( धर्म शिला ) is a name meaning "Dharma Rock", "rock of righteousness" or "pillar of virtue," and suggests strength and a strong moral compass. The names meaning itself is powerful: a steadfast rock representing righteous conduct.
- Durveshwar ( दुर्वेश्वर ) = the God of Durvasa ((i)Shwar (श्वर ) = God, Lord, Supreme Master)
- Durvasa (दुर्वासा) literally means someone who is difficult to live with. It comes from "dur" which is a negative prefix indicating difficult or bad-tempered, as in durgunam (bad qualities), and the word "Vasathi" which means to live or stay at a place. Combined it means "the one who is difficult to live with".

According to ancient legend, Sage Durvasa performed a rigorous penance in the area, which caught the attention of Lord Shiva. Impressed by the sage's devotion, Shiva granted him a boon. Sage Durvasa, acknowledging the region's water scarcity, requested the presence of water near his place of meditation. Lord Shiva, in response, blessed the area with seven streams representing the Saptarishi (seven sages), and thus, Dal Lake was formed.

== Location ==
- Distance from Dharamshala: 11 km

== See also ==
- Battle of Sirhind, 1758
