= Ghadhasaru Lake =

Lake in Himachal Pradesh, India

- Location within Himachal Pradesh Location within India
- Location: Churah tehsil, Chamba district
- Coordinates: 32°52′12″N 76°20′08″E
- Type: High altitude lake
- Basin countries: India
- Shore length^{1}: 1,000 m (3,300 ft)
- Surface elevation: 3,470 m (11,380 ft)
- References: Himachal Pradesh Tourism Dep.
- ^{1} Shore length is not a well-defined measure.

Ghadhasaru Lake or Gadasru Mahadev Lake (alternatively spelled as Gandasaru or Gadasaru) is a high-altitude lake located near Devikothi village in the Churah tehsil of Chamba district in Himachal Pradesh, India at an elevation of about 3,470 metres (11,380 ft) above the sea level at the base of mountain Gadasaru Peak. The lake is held sacred by the locals and has a circumference of about 1 km.

== History ==
Near the lake, there is a small temple to the Goddess Kali. Nearby, the Mahakali Lake is considered sacred to the Goddess Mahakali.
