= Joginder Nagar Valley =

Valley in Himachal Pradesh, India

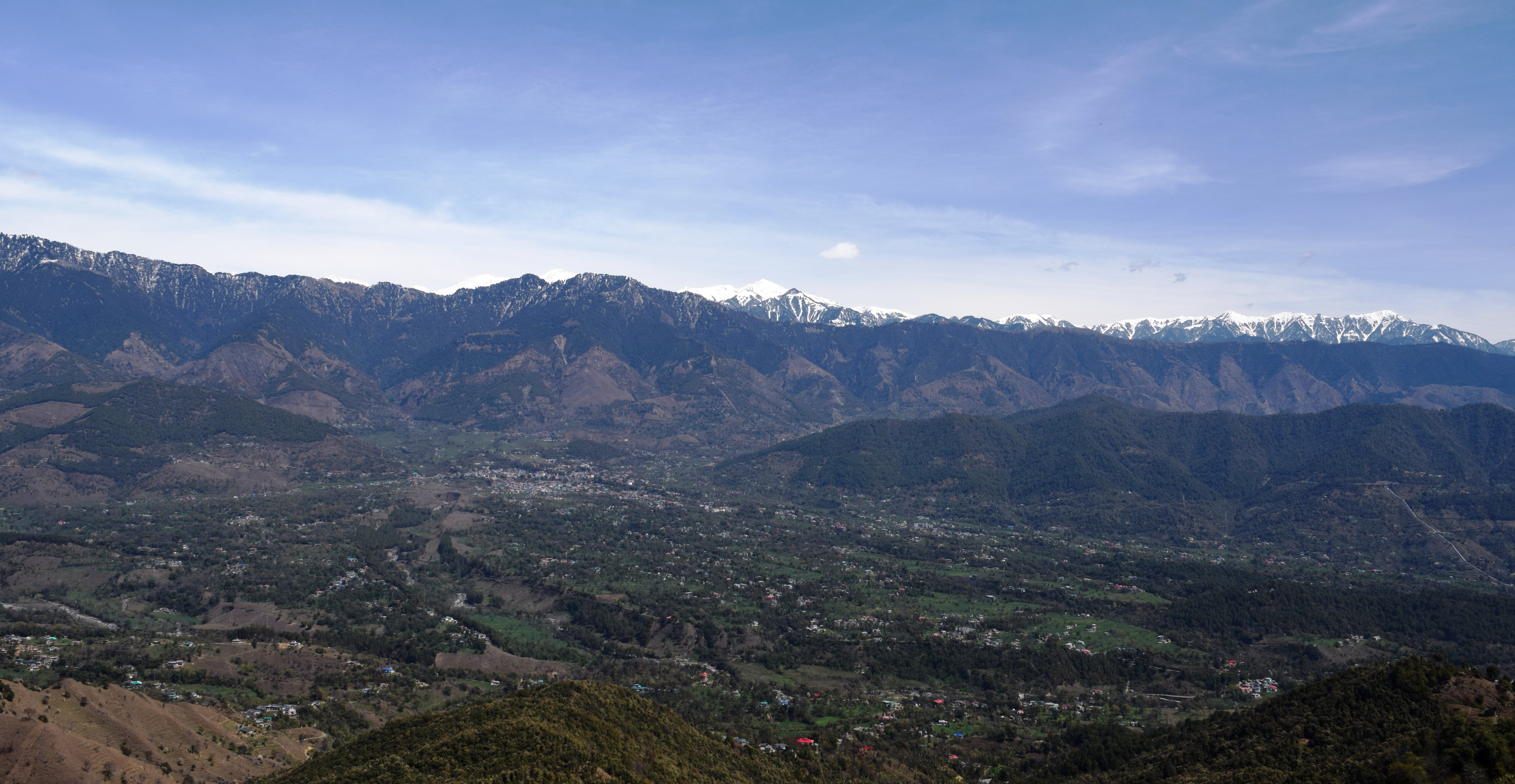
- Floor elevation: 1220m
- Length: 20 km (12 mi)
- Width: 10 km (6.2 mi)

Naming
- Native name: भंगाल घाटी (Hindi)

Geology
- Type: Adventurous

Geography
- Location: Himachal Pradesh in India
- Population centers: Joginder Nagar, Chauntra, Bir, Ahju
- Coordinates: 31.99°N 76.79°E
- Rivers: Beas river
- Interactive map of Joginder Nagar Valley

Joginder Nagar Valley also known as Bhangaal Valley or Bhangaal region is a valley in the Indian state of Himachal Pradesh. The valley contains the town of Joginder Nagar, Bir-Billing, Chauntra and various other hill resorts surrounded by mountains on all sides. The natives of the region are popularly known as "Bhangaalie" in local Pahari dialects. The valley falls in the mid-hill zone (800 to 3000 metres) of the Dhauladhar mountain range in the foothills of the Indian Himalayas. Geographically, the valley starts near Ghatta (4 kilometres from Baijnath) at its westernmost point and stretches south-eastwards up to Ghatasani, 15 kilometres from the main town. On an average, the valley is stretched 20 kilometres in length and 10 kilometers in width.

The valley is particularly known for adventure sports of Paragliding, Trekking and Mountain biking, and has options for angling, camping as well as sightseeing. It lies in Mandi district except part of north-western corner that falls in Kangra district including Bir-Billing. Geographically, almost quadrilateral in topography, it is marked by Ghornala hills on the east, Mt. Winch Camp on the north, Siyuri Dhar on the east and Siqandar Dhar mountain ranges in the southern direction.

== Funicular Trolley (4 km) ==
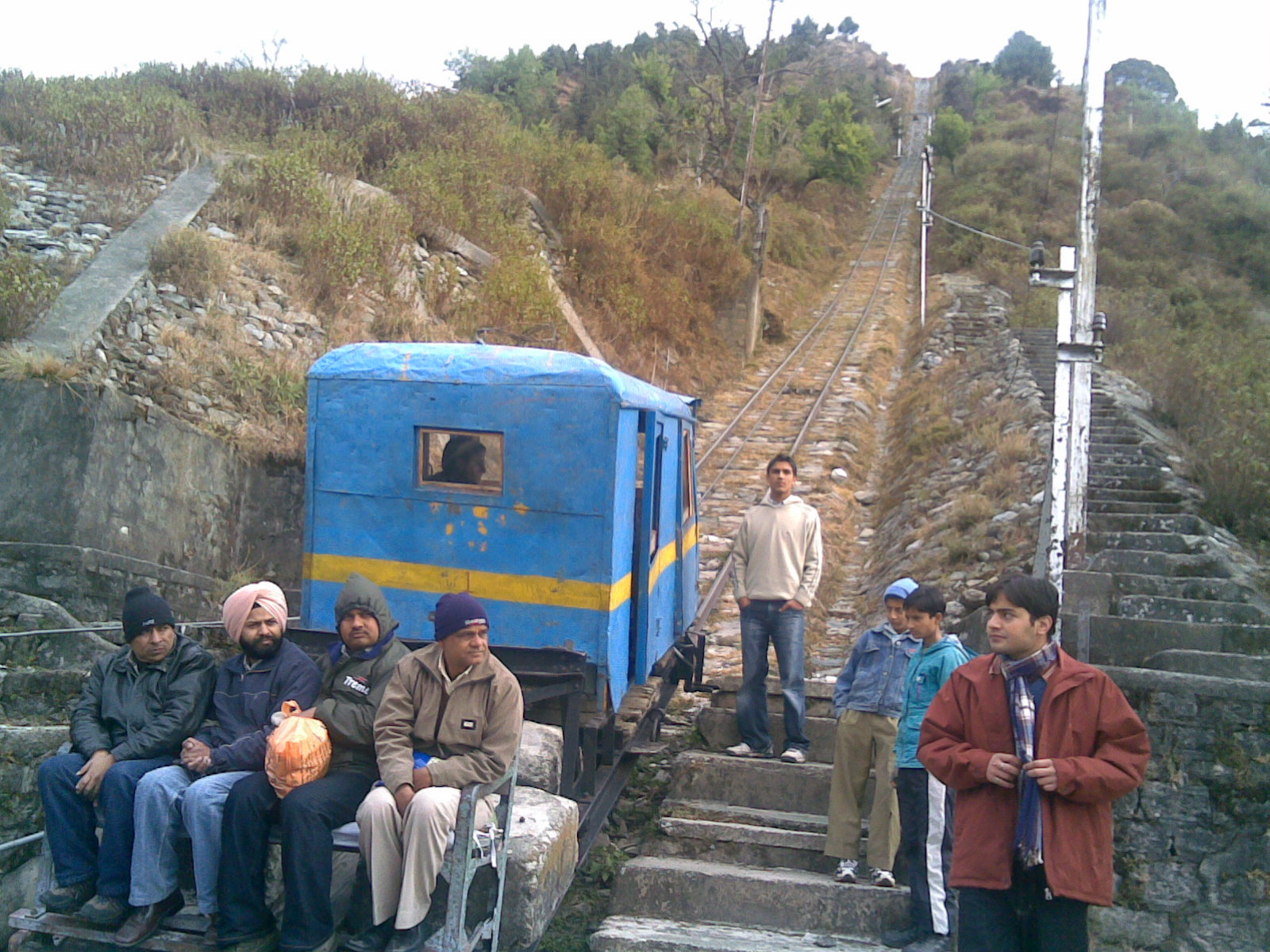
Haulage

Haulage trolley or car in Jogindernagar is Asia's highest funicular railway track that takes rides up to 2500 metres above sea level. It is a 4-stage network of funicular and horizontal track and has six haulage car stations starting at Buffer Stop as base station at Shanan. Next is Adit Junction set up at higher altitude of 1770 metres. It is widely called '18 Number' because of having 18 divisions along way the pipes carrying water to turbines from Adit Junction to Buffer Stop. The water rushes down from the reservoir at Barot in the Uhl river through penstock pipes going down nearly a thousand meters. The loading capacity of haulage way cars are 15, 10, 5 tons. Higher the capacity, lower the speed. Haulage Way Car or Trolley at Jogindernagar is one of a few funicular railways all over the globe due to geographical and technological challenges faced to construct them and is considered as an engineering marvel of the 20th century.

== Winch Camp (7 km) ==
Winch Camp is highest settlement in Jogindernagar Valley situated at an altitude of 2400 metres. The height of the peak is near about 2700 metres. On the way to Winch camp, can be found dense forests of Rhododendron (Burans or locally known as Brah ka fool) from which people prepare sauce having medicinal properties. From this place, one can see kilometres of distance including Beas River, Mandi Hills, Kangra Valley and Hamirpur boundaries. In winter season, there is heavy snowfall over mountains dipping temperature as low as -10 degrees in upper reaches . At this time, tourists and locals trek up to Winch Camp to enjoy the snow. On the other side of the mountain is Headgear, the next haulage way station at an altitude of 2500 metres and is connected to Winch Camp through a 3-km long horizontal rail track. This spot packs panoramic scenery of Dhauladhar Himalayan ranges standing tall up to 5000 metres from the sea level. From Headgear haulage way car descends the steep hill having a large gradient up to 48 degrees. This steep hill is known as ‘Khooni Ghati’ literally ‘the killer valley’ due to steep gradient. Next station is Katheru further leading to terminal station of Zero Point, the base station on other side of the Barot valley.

== Barot ==
Located at the opposite side of Winch Camp, Barot has two reservoirs of the Shanan Power House. It has a trout breeding centre. Across the river Uhl is the Nargu Wildlife Sanctuary home to the Himalayan goral, Himalayan black bear, snow leopard, Monal, Golden eagle, musk deer, wild cat and a variety of pheasants. Barot can be reached via 40 kilometre roadway or trekking via any of the two treks from Joginder Nagar.

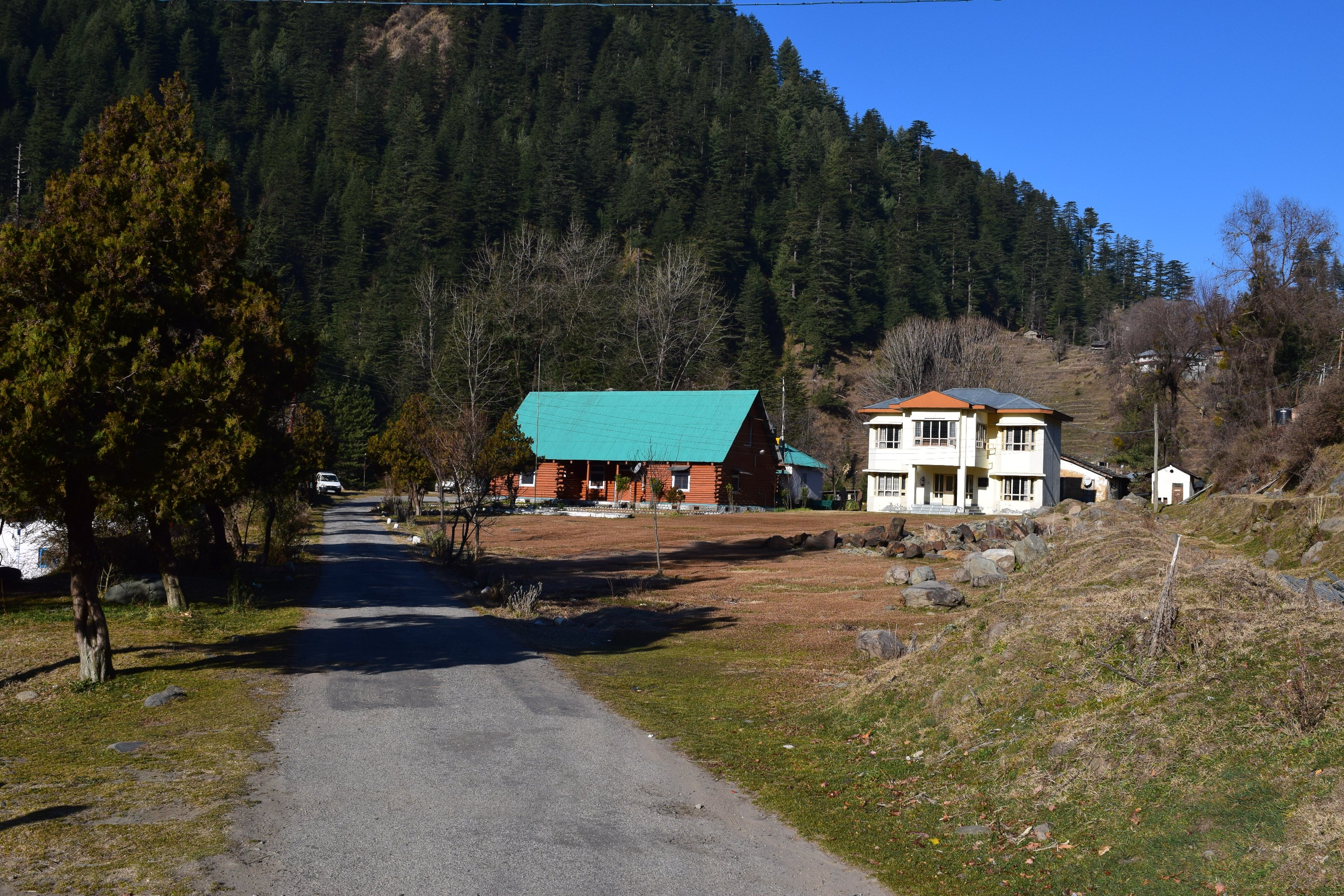
Sylvan Retreat, a British era rest-house at Barot

1. Bridge Mandi-Adit Junction (18 Number)-Winch Camp-Jalani-Barot

- Total Distance: 9 km
- Difficulty Level: Medium
- Highest Point: 2500 m
- Duration: 6–8 hours
- Altitude gain: 1200 m

Starting at Bridge Mandi, uphill trek lies along haulage railway line. After reaching Winch Camp, one has the option to trek along the railway trek via Head Gear, Katheru and Zero point to reach Barot or can choose the easier route via Jalani village, although the distance remains same.

2. Harabagh(Nagchala)-Digli-Kao-Barot

- Total Distance: 9 km
- Difficulty Level: Medium
- Highest Point: 2300 m
- Duration: 5–7 hours
- Altitude gain: 1000 m

Mountain Biking to Barot:

- Route: Joginder Nagar-Ghatasani-Jhatingri-Tikkan-Barot
- Total Distance: 39 km
- Difficulty level: Medium
- Highest Point: 2030 m
- Duration: 3–4 hours
- Altitude gain: 800 m

North-eastwards of Barot, Dehnasar Lake is a high altitude and glacial fed lake where holy journeys are started in the months of July to September.

== Bir-Billing (14 km) ==
The town of Bir attracts visitors for ecotourism, courses in meditation and philosophy, and eco-volunteering. The main ecotourism attractions are paragliding, trekking, and meditation retreats in the wooded rural setting. Another attraction of Bir is the Bir Tibetan Colony, with several monasteries and fine works of art.

The area is becoming a popular destination for more adventurous paraglider pilots. It offers reliable and wide-ranging conditions in a wide range of environments, from the relative security of the largely wooded Dhauladar range to the more extreme flying of the snowfields to the north.

An FAI category two paragliding competition is organized annually by the Department of Tourism and Civil Aviation at Bir-Billing in the month of October or November. Billing (2300m) is the launch spot from where paragliders take off for landing at Chowgan, where this competition is held. Every year, about a hundred participants from all over the world take part in this particular competition. The event attracts many viewers, including international tourists. Weather conditions at that time of year are very reliable and the competition has been virtually unaffected by adverse weather (2001-2012.) Competitors take off from Billing and fly over the mountains of Baijnath and Jogindernagar.

The competition was first established by the Chief Minister of the State of Himachal Pradesh. Several world records have been made by international paragliders here.

Billing Top is the highest peak of the valley at 3080 metres and can be reached via Trekking or mountain biking on Bir-Billing road.

1. Trekking to Billing Top:

- Route: Bir-Billing-Billing Top
- Distance: 8 km
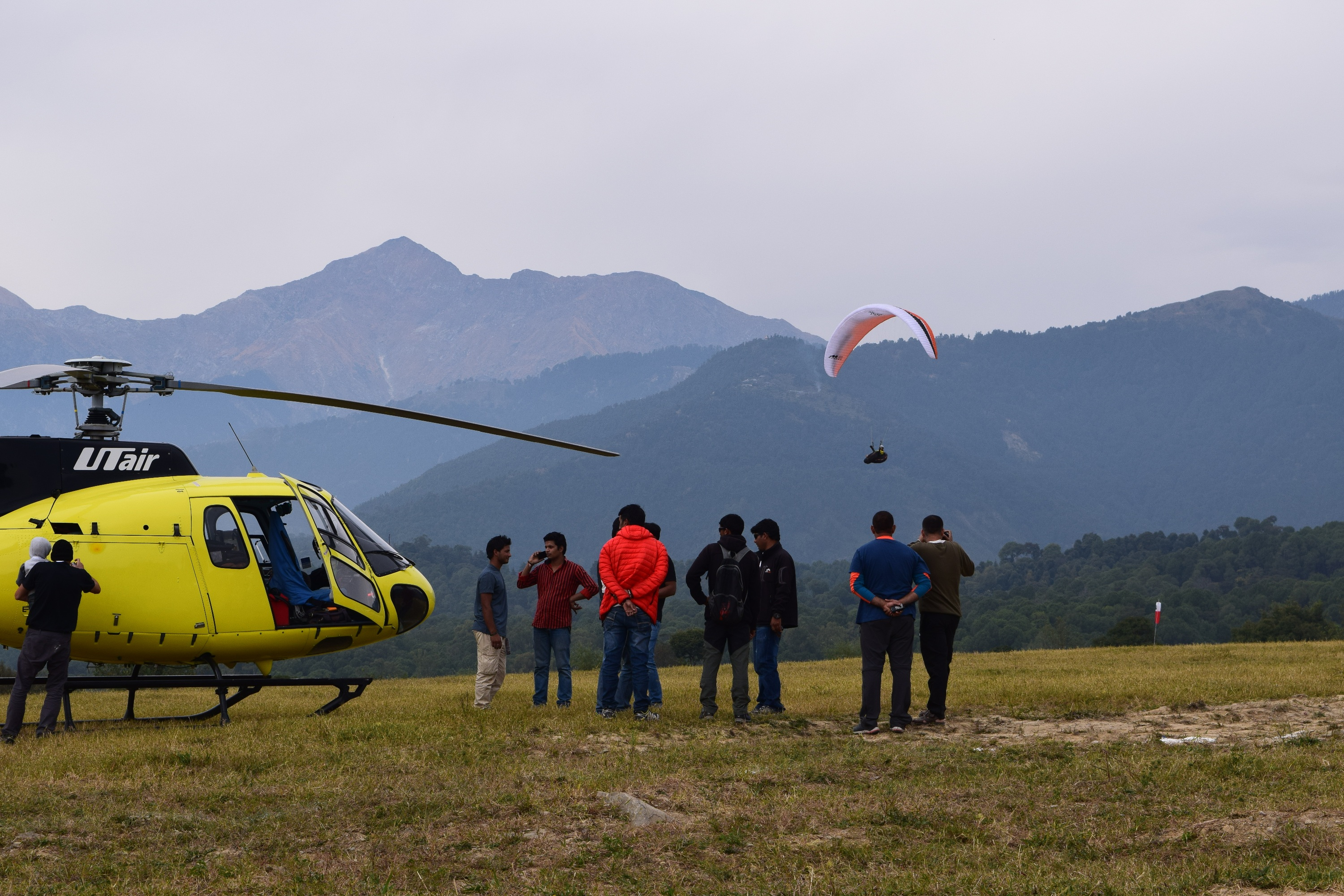
- A rescue helicopter deployed at Paragliding World Cup 2015 at Bir
  Highest Point: 3080 m (Billing Top)
- Difficulty Level: Medium
- Duration: 5–6 hours
- Altitude gain: 1600 m

2. Mountain Biking to Chaina Pass (near Billing Top):

- Route: Bir-Billing-Chaina Pass
- Distance: 24 km
- Highest Point: 2730 metres (Chaina Pass)
- Difficulty Level : Medium-Difficult
- Duration: 3–4 hours
- Altitude gain: 1300 m

One can trek and mountain bike down further towards Barot via Rajgundha and Bada Gran villages. Major portion of this single lane roadway is unpaved and severely affected during monsoon season.

- Route: Chaina Pass-Rajgundha-Bada Gran-Barot
- Distance: 25 km
- Difficulty Level : Medium
- Duration: 3–4 hours
- Altitude loss: 900 m

== Ghornala (15km) ==
At the western side of the Jogindernagar Valley lies the village of Ghornala, approximately midway between Bir and Baijnath. Ghornala is emerging as a centre for low-key ecotourism, meditation studies, and volunteering, with the primary attractions being the Dharmalaya Institute for Compassionate Living and Ghornala Resort.

== Shanan Power House (3 km) ==
Jogindernagar is the only town in Asian continent having three Power houses running on same stream water. The vision of the hydel project scheme was to construct five power stations using the same water that is drawn from the Uhl River. Shanan Power House of Jogindernagar is one of the oldest Hydro-electric power houses of India. This power house was built by Col. Batty, an English engineer and his team. Most of the credit of creation of Jogindernagar and to make it a popular town goes to him. Afterwards more high capacity turbines were built here but unfortunately, being this power house in HP it is still under Punjab State Govt. Shanan Power House at Jogindernagar is one of the first Hydro-electric Powerhouses of India and perhaps one of the oldest in the world.

== Kangra Valley Railway (0 km) ==
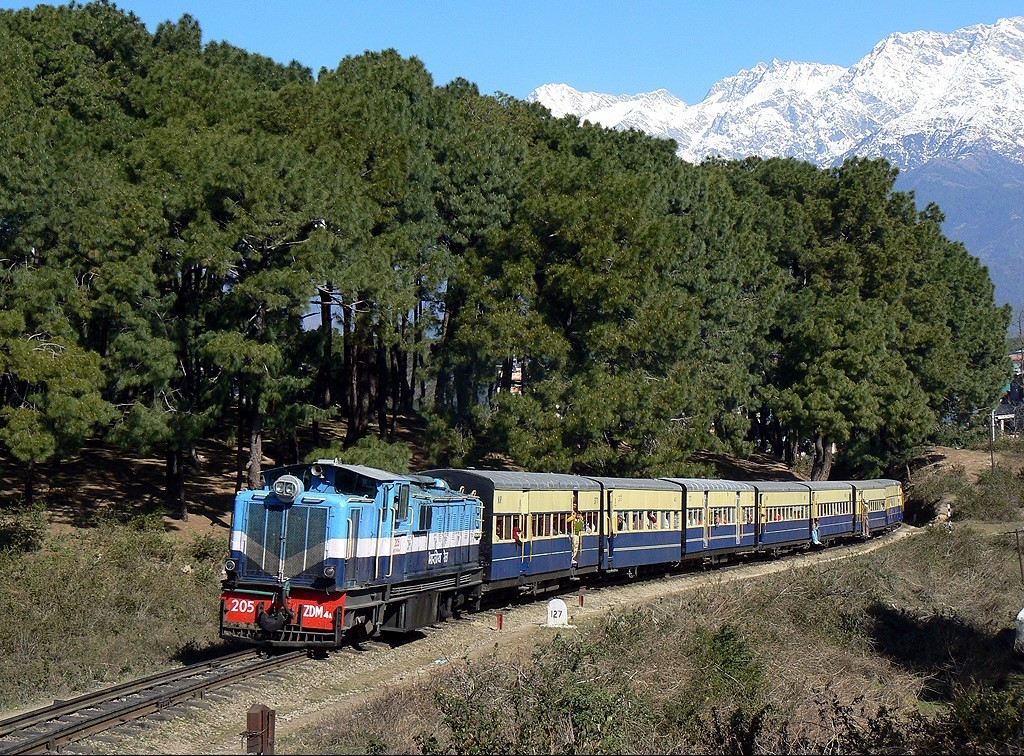

Joginder Nagar is well connected with a narrow gauge railway line. This railway track was built during 1926–1929 and was opened for transporting raw material for construction of Shanan Power House on 1 April 1929. This railway line has been nominated for inclusion in UNESCO's cultural heritage list. Proposals for extending this railway track up to Leh have been made. The proposed 460 km long railway line will pass from Joginder Nagar, Manali, Keylong, Pang and will go up to Leh. There was a steam engine which has been replaced by diesel engine. Jogindernagar-Pathankot is the longest railway line track of Himachal Pradesh.

== Fuladhar (25 km) ==
A hilltop resort at eastern side of valley is known for paragliding, trekking and camping. Located at 2270 metres on a ridge, this flat terraced place provides 360 degree views of Joginder Nagar and Barot Valleys. It is accessed through 4 kilometres trekking route from Jhatigri via Devdhar village.

Trek or mountain bike to Phuladhar:

- Route: Jhatingri-Devdhar-Phuladhar
- Distance: 4 km
- Highest Point : 2300m
- Duration: 1–2 hours
- Difficulty Level: Easy
- Altitude Gain: 300 m

== Devidarh ==
A high altitude hill-top meadow is situated on the ridge amid Joginder Nagar and Barot valleys at around 2900 metres. Almost a kilometre long sprawling meadow all round commands a 360 degree view of the Dhauladhar and Shivalik ranges. It has a forest rest house for overnight stays and grounds for camping. The meadow receives heavy snowfall during December to March period. Temperatures can drop below -10 degrees during extreme winters with windy conditions.

Trek to Devidarh from Joginder Nagar:

- Route: Bridge Mandi-Adit Junction(18 Number)-Winch Camp-Devidarh
- Distance: 11 km
- Highest Point : 2900m (Devidarh)
- Duration: 10–12 hours (1 day)
- Difficulty Level: Moderate
- Altitude Gain: 1600 m

Trek to Devidarh from Fuladhar via Winch Camp:

- Route: Fuladhar-Winch Camp-Devidarh
- Distance: 17 km
- Highest Point : 2900 m (Devidarh)
- Duration: 2 days
- Difficulty Level: Moderate
- Altitude Gain: 600 m

One can further trek towards Billing westwards from Devidarh.

Trek to Billing from Devidarh:

- Route: Devidarh-Chaina Pass-Billing
- Distance: 7 km
- Highest Point : 2920m (Satvajni Peak)
- Duration: 5–6 hours (1 day)
- Difficulty Level: Easy-Moderate
- Altitude Loss: 500 m

== Gumma Rock-salt Mines (10 km) ==
The only rock salt mines in India are located at the village of Gumma. An estimated 16.03 million tonnes of salt reserves are proposed to be extracted from Gumma and Darang mines under an investment of 300 crore rupees by public sector firm. Currently both the mines are closed due to temporary closure of mining operations.

== High Peaks (5–20km) ==
The highest peaks of Jogindernagar Valley are Billing Top (10,100 feet), Devidarh (9416 feet), Winch Camp (8,820 feet), Fuladhar (7,415 feet), Siqander Dhar (6,010 feet), Siyuri Dhar(5500 feet), Banderi (5,225 feet). In Siqandar Dhar as well as Banderi, some ancient forts are constructed by rulers of that period. There is heavy snowfall over these mountains during winter particularly Billing, Winch Camp and Jhatingari in the months November to March. The temperature drops as low as -10 degree Celsius in upper reaches and up to -4 degree Celsius in the town and nearby areas in peak winter nights. The town witnesses light snowfall rarely which melts instantly (as seen in 2008 and 2011).

== Baba Balakrupi Temple (2km) ==
This temple is situated in Garoru village which is also called as Balakrupi after this temple. (The name "Balakrupi" which means "Incarnation as a Male Child" was given to Lord Balak Nath who according to an ancient belief was the re-incarnation of Lord Kartikeya, the son of Lord Shiva.

Balkarupi temple which is 2 km from Jogindernagar is a very ancient. Baba Balak Nath who is one of the 9 "Nathas" and 84 "Sidhas" is one of the most prominent deities of North Indian states of Himachal Pradesh and Punjab. A small temple of Baba Balak Nath is situated at the very courtyard of every Hindu house of Himachal Pradesh.

Every year twice local fair is held here at Balakrupi on every Saturday of a particular month. In Balakrupi temple a special tradition of cutting down the hair of 2 and half-year-old child known as Mundan Sanskar’ is done.

== Lakshminarayana Temple (5 km) ==
In a nearby village known as Ner (6 km from Jogindernagar) is a hundreds of year old temple of Lord Lakshminarayana. Lord Vishnu is said to have meditated here for 300 years and is built by Pandavas. This temple came into the minds of people when an industrialist from other state dreamt of meeting God and God said him to take care of the temple. Industrialist donated thousand of rupees for the repair of this temple. It is said that the idol of God on that night moved inches from its original place and bells started ringing automatically.

== Bassi Power House and Chaprot (6 km) ==
The generation cost of Bassi Power Project at Jogindernagar is the cheapest in the country. Its capacity is 66 MW. HPSEB has constructed a housing colony for its employees working in the Bassi Power House having almost all modern amenities. A temple of Baba Balakanath known as Chapru Baba which is situated at a distance of 2 km from Bassi Colony on a steep hill in tranquillity of forest. The pilgrims come from distant places to visit the temple. It is said that one (late) Pt. Accharu Ram, a retired forest ranger and a landlord from the Mandi State had constructed a big house known as KOTHI (which is visible from the Bassi Colony) settled there and he had a dream where Lord Baba Balaknath directed him to construct a temple. From Kothi one can go to Chaprot by foot as well as Chapru Baba Temple. Descendants of Pandit Accharu Ram are respectfully called as BAJIYA by the local folks which means landlord in local dialect. Chaprot is situated on the top of the hill surrounding Bassi which is a tail water reservoir of Uhl river coming from Shanan Power House and a famous picnic spot. Chaprot supplies water to Bassi Power House through colossal pipes that cross Chapru village and ultimately flow into the Machyal Khad.

== Chauntra (9 km) ==
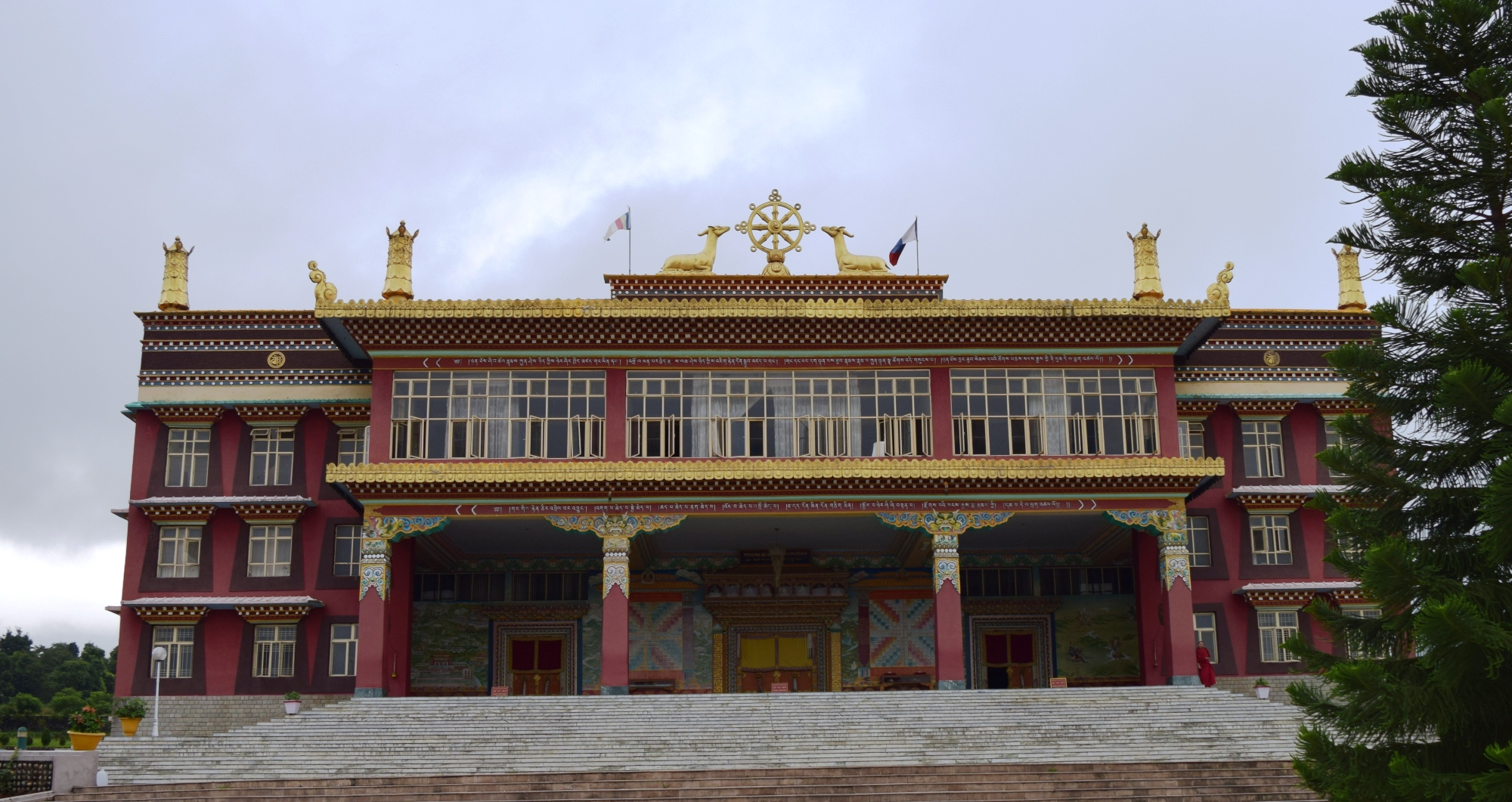
Dzongser Khyentse Monastery at Chauntra

The scenic village is home to half a dozen Buddhist monasteries and a large Institution for Tibetan children called Tibet Children's village. It is showered with tea orchards and terraced fields.

== Banar Baba Temple (10 km) ==
A temple at an altitude of 1700 m above sea level is held sacred to Banar Baba or Baba Balaknath and situated in Banar village at a steep rocky mountain. It is locally believed that various kind of skin diseases can be cured by taking a bath near holy waterfall in Banar village.

== Maheshwari Temple (Gadhwali Mata) (12 km) ==
This temple, popularly known as the Gaddwali Mata Temple, is situated in an old fort at an altitude of 1450 m on the top of the hill in Sikandar Dhar mountain range. Thousands of people every year come to pray to the goddess. An annual fair is held during Navratri Period. From this place one can see Joginder Nagar Valley & Kangra valley on the other side. Another historical fort is located at half a kilometre distance.

== Machyial Lake (8 km) ==
9 km from the Hotel Uhl is this small lake held sacred to Golden Mahseer worshipped as Machinder Nath literally meaning to 'the Fish God'. Fish are fed and worshipped especially on Saturdays and Tuesdays. Fishing is strictly prohibited in the stream. A religious fair is organized here every year on the occasion of Baisakhi festival lasting for three days. It has historical ruins of a bridge over Ranna Khadd, a tributary of Beas. Out flowing water of Uhl river from Bassi Power house merges into Ranna Khadd at Machyal. A temple dedicated to Machinder Nath lies beside the small lake along with old idols of gods. A comparatively larger lake is 1 km westwards from sacred lake which is 200 m lengthy and 50 m broad and remains crowded with Himalayan Mahseer. The first Mahseer fish farm of India is located at Bhararu, a nearby village 2 kilometres southwards.

== Chaturbhuja Temple (25km) ==
An ancient temple situated at an altitude of 1500 m is held sacred to Goddess Chaturbhuja literally 'the four-armed Goddess' and one of the forms of Goddess Durga, is situated at Basahi Dhar. The temple remains crowded with devotees in Navratri period.

== Siqandar Dhar and Forts (15km by road, 4 km by trekking) ==
Siqandar Dhar is a small mountain range of 30 km from North-west to South-east. It is home to a number of wildlife species including Indian peacock and Himalayan tiger along with flora species of rhododendron and Himalayan subtropical pine forests. Bhabhori peak is the highest point on this range at 1830 m from sea level and has a temple dedicated to Goddess Bhabhori at the top. The name 'Siqandar Dhar' is believed to be associated with "Alexander the Great".

== See also ==
- Bir
- Bir Tibetan Colony
- Dehnasar Lake
- Himachal Pradesh
- Joginder Nagar
- Mandi
- Thamsar Pass
