= Macchial Lake =

Lake in Himachal Pradesh, India

- Location within Himachal Pradesh Location within India
- Location: Joginder Nagar, Mandi district
- Coordinates: 31°56′17″N 76°47′49″E
- Primary inflows: Ranna Khad, Neri Khad
- Primary outflows: Ranna Khad, a tributary of the Beas river
- Catchment area: Joginder Nagar Valley
- Basin countries: India
- Max. length: 200 m (660 ft)
- Max. width: 50 m (160 ft)
- Max. depth: 5 m (16 ft)
- Surface elevation: 850 m (2,790 ft)

Macchial Lake or Machyal Lake is a low altitude lake in Mandi district in the state of Himachal Pradesh, India.
