= Bir, Himachal Pradesh =

Bir Bir Billing
- Village
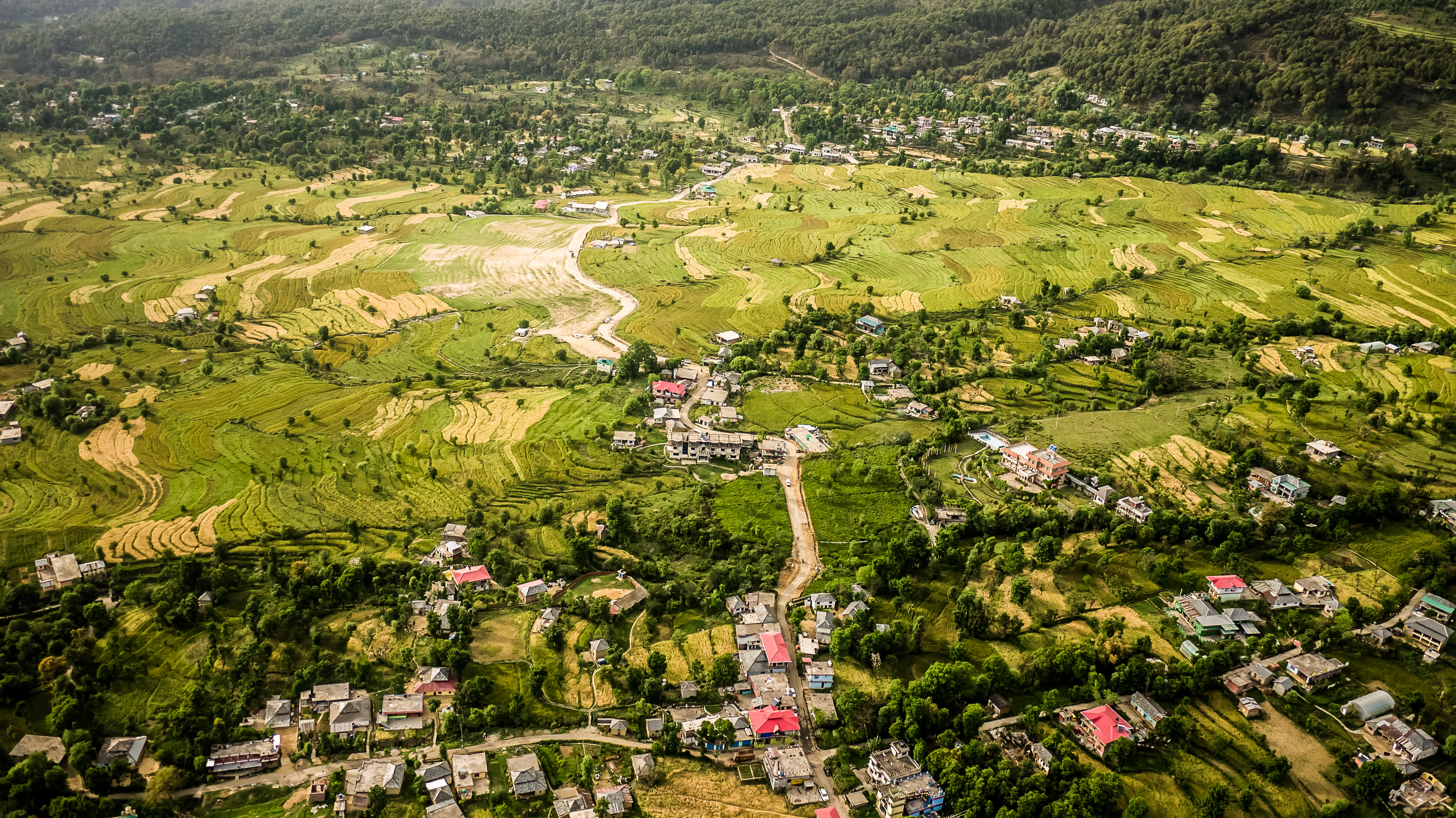
- Aerial view of Bir

- Location in Himachal Pradesh, India Bir (India)
- Coordinates: 32.05°N 76.70°E
- Country: India
- State: Himachal Pradesh
- Region: Baijnath
- District: Kangra
- Elevation: 1,525 m (5,003 ft)

Languages
  - Official: Hindi
  - Regional: Kangri
- Time zone: UTC+5:30 (IST)
- PIN: 176 077
- Telephone code: 91-1894

Bir is a rural village located in the west of the Joginder Nagar Valley in the state of Himachal Pradesh in northern India.

It is the location of the Bir Tibetan Colony, founded in the early 1960s as a settlement for Tibetan refugees after the 1959 Tibetan uprising. Bir is noted for several other Tibetan Buddhist monasteries and its growing tourism sector, with Bir Billing becoming known as the paragliding capital of India.

== History ==
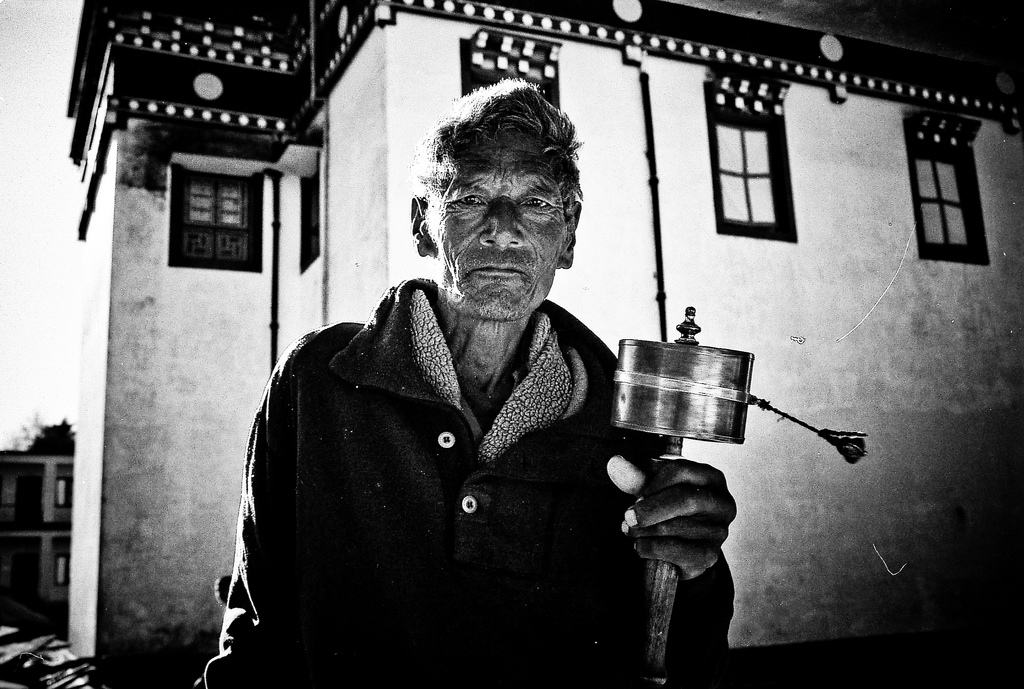
A Tibetan pilgrim spinning a prayer wheel (mani wheel) at the Tibetan Buddhist Monastery, 1998

In 1966, the third Neten Chokling (1928–1973), an incarnate lama of the Nyingma lineage of Tibetan Buddhism, brought his family and a small entourage to Bir. With the help of foreign aid, Neten Chokling purchased over 200 acres of land and established a Tibetan settlement where 300 Tibetan families were given land to build houses. At this time, Chokling Rinpoche also started building a new Neten monastery in Bir and disciples who had followed him to India formed their first sangha. When the third Chokling Rinpoche died in 1973, his eldest son, Orgyen Tobgyal Rinpoche (born 1951), assumed responsibility for completing his father's vision. The fourth Neten Chokling incarnation was born in 1973 in Bhutan and was brought to Bir at a young age, where the family of the third Chokling took him under their wings. In 2004, full responsibility for the Pema Ewam Chögar Gyurme Ling Monastery in Bir was passed to the fourth Neten Chokling.

Presently, supportive centres of the Nyingma, Karma Kagyu, and the Sakya schools are located either in the town of Bir or nearby. A large stupa is also located in the village.

== Geography ==
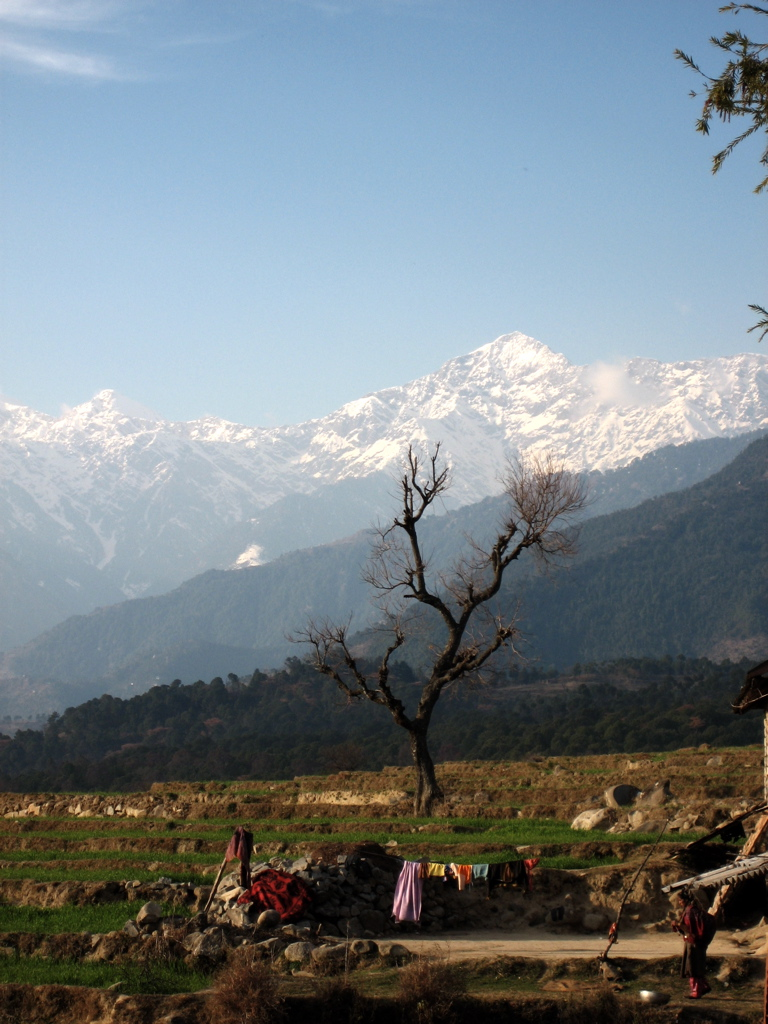
Fields and mountains near Bir Tibetan Colony.

Bir is in the tehsil (administrative subdivision) of Baijnath, in the district of Kangra in the Indian state of Himachal Pradesh.

Geologically, Bir is situated in the Joginder Nagar Valley, Dhauladhar Range of the foothills of the Indian Himalayas.

== Orientation ==
The historical centre of Bir is in Upper Bir (Bir proper).

The Bir Tibetan Colony (often simply called the "Colony" by locals) is at the west end of the village of Chowgan, about a 20-minute walk (or five-minute taxi) below Upper Bir.

Sherab Ling Monastery is a 50-to-70-minute walk (or 15-minute taxi) from Chowgan, or slightly longer from Upper Bir.

The village of Ghornala is the location of the Dharmalaya Institute, a Sikh retreat centre, several homestays and camps, and a few cottages. It is about midway between Bir and Sansal.

== Population ==
The population of Bir is primarily composed of Indian agriculturalists. There is also a sizable community of Tibetan refugees in the Bir Tibetan Colony (see below) and a small community of international expatriates and long-term students, volunteers, and visitors. Many in Bir work in the growing tourism sector, with hotels and homestays located in and around the village and spreading towards other villages, including Damehar, Gunehar, and Chauntra. Overall, ecotourism, spiritual studies, trekking to tribal villages, mountain biking, paragliding, and meditation draws visitors.

== Prominent institutions and attractions ==
Several institutions in Bir attract students, tourists, volunteers and other visitors from around India and from abroad:

The Deer Park Institute is a "centre for the study of classical Indian wisdom traditions" established by Dzongsar Khyentse Rinpoche in March 2006 under the patronage of the Dalai Lama. The institute hosts frequent guest lectures and workshops with reputed scholars and meditation teachers.

The Dharmalaya Institute is an eco-campus for service-learning and contemplative practice. Dharmalaya is an Indian charitable society (NGO) "devoted to education, service, and compassionate living, with a practical focus on sustainable village development, contemplative service-learning, and immersive ecotourism".

Chokling Gompa is the monastery of Neten Chokling Rinpoche, a reincarnate lama in the Nyingma tradition of Tibetan Buddhism and the director of the film Milarepa (2006). The Tibetan architecture and large stupa are the principal attractions for casual visitors. In addition to its ongoing programmes for its full-time monastic students, the monastery periodically hosts Buddhist ceremonies open to the public. There is a guest house and restaurant on the premises.

The Bir Tea Factory is a long-standing Bir cooperative, which offers tours for those interested in the process of tea production.

Camp Oak View is the oldest glamping site in Bir Billing, Himachal Pradesh, India. It offers accommodations along with various outdoor and recreational activities. The camp provides facilities for bird watching, stargazing, and yoga meditation workshops organized periodically. Visitors can also participate in village and nature walks to explore the surrounding landscape. Several trekking routes originate from Camp Oak View, including the Hanuman Garh Trek, Thathi Village Trek, Waterfall Trek, and Sunset Point Trek. The area around the camp serves as the primary water source for all monasteries in the Bhattu and Bir regions.

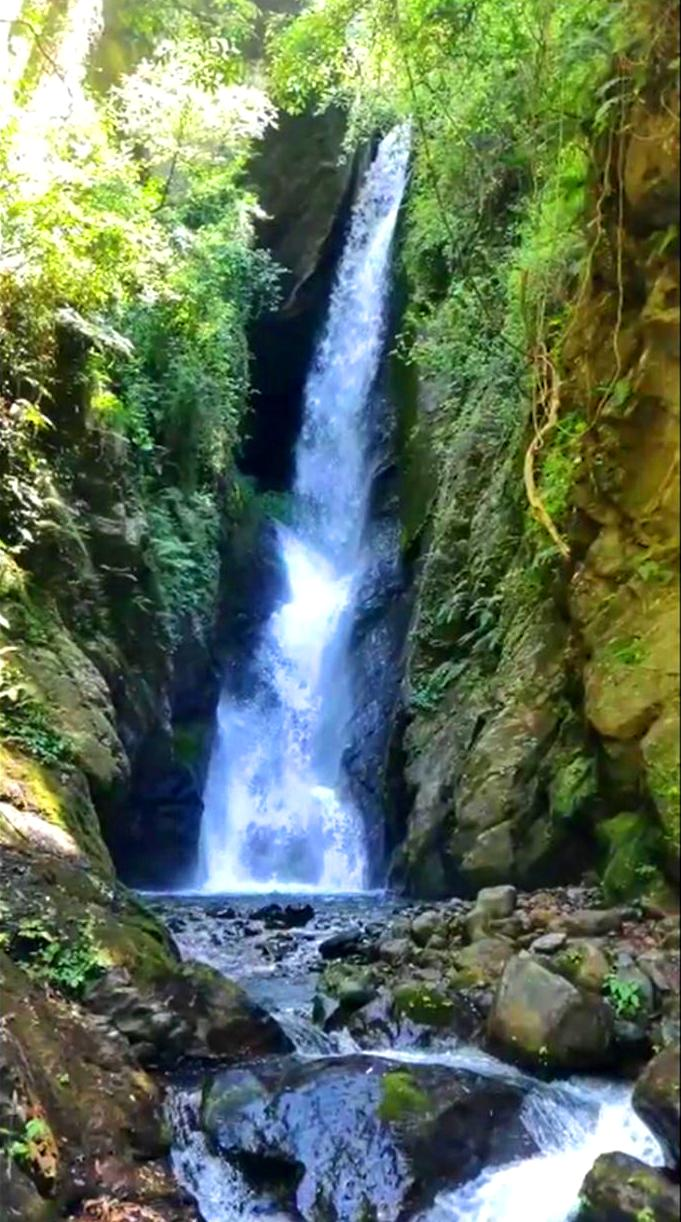
Waterfall in Bir Billing, bir waterfall

=== Paragliding ===
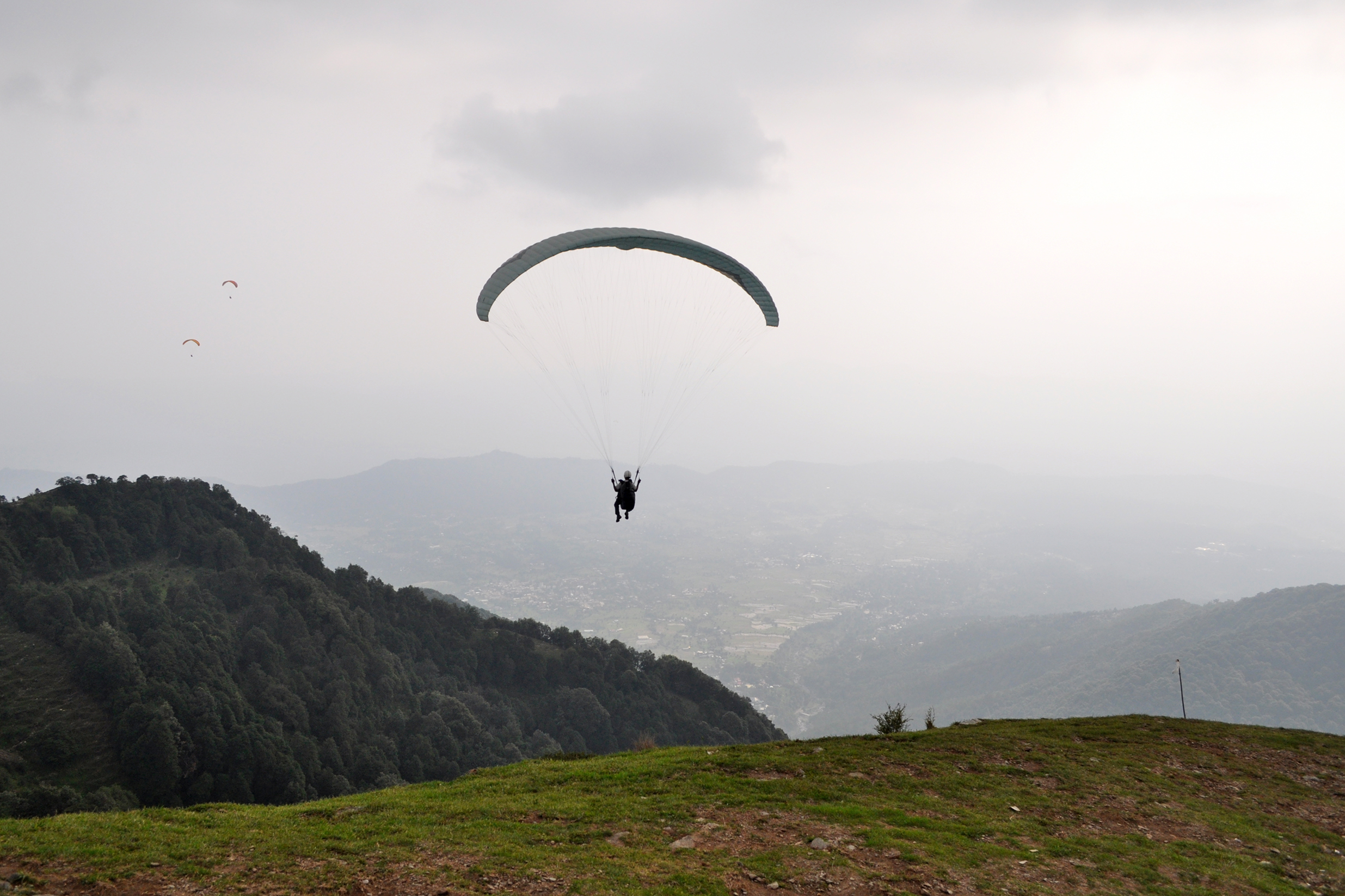
Paragliding at Bir

The Bir-Billing area is a popular site for paragliding; both Indians and visitors come from all over the world. The flying season is in September and October, with some flying in November. The village hosts international competitions and events.

The paragliding launch site is in the meadow at Billing (14 km north of Bir), at an elevation of 2400 meters, while the landing site and most tourist accommodations are in the village of Chowgan (also spelled Chaugan), on the southern edge of Bir.

=== Bir Tibetan Colony ===
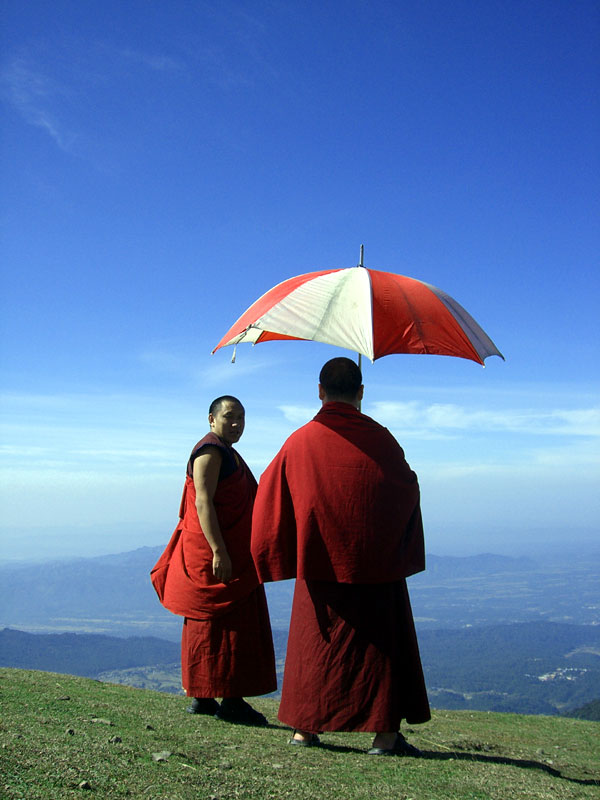
Tibetan monks in Bir

Bir Tibetan Colony is a Tibetan refugee settlement located at the west end of the village of Chowgan on the south-western edge of the village of Bir.

Bir Tibetan Colony was established in the early 1960s following the exile of the Dalai Lama and other Tibetans from Tibet.

Bir Tibetan Colony houses several Tibetan monasteries (representing the Nyingma, Kagyu, and Sakya traditions), a Tibetan handicraft centre, a Tibetan Children's Village school (Suja), a branch of the Tibetan Medical and Astrological Institute (Men-Tsee-Khang), a medical clinic, and the Deer Park Institute.

== In popular culture ==
Bir was the setting for Khyentse Norbu's first feature film, The Cup (Phörpa) (1999), which was based on events that took place in Bir during the 1998 World Cup final and was shot on location in Bir.

Bir is also popular for hosting the indie art and music festival called Bir Music Festival. It is a bi-annual festival conducted primarily to boost the tourism of the village by promoting originally composed music of emerging artists. The festival has hosted over 450 artists including acclaimed rock bands like Indian Ocean and Agnee.

== Transportation ==
=== Train ===
Ahju railway station, a narrow-gauge railway, is 3 kilometres away. About 112 kilometres away is the broad gauge station at Pathankot, Punjab, which is connected to major cities in India.

=== Air ===
Kangra Airport is 67 kilometres away. Chandigarh Airport is 152 kilometres and New Delhi Airport is 520 kilometres away.

=== Road ===
Bir can be reached from the Bir Road turnoff (signposted) on NH 20 (now NH 154), approximately midway between Baijnath and Jogindernagar. It is approximately 50 km (31 mi) south-east of Dharamshala at a distance of two to three hours by road. It is 14 km south of Billing, which lies on the way to the Thamsar Pass leading to Bara Bhangal.
