= Bir Tibetan Colony =

Bir Tibetan Colony Chowgan
- village
- Location in Himachal Pradesh, India Bir Tibetan Colony (India)
- Coordinates: 32.037655°N 76.713088°E
- Country: India
- Region: North India
- State: Himachal Pradesh
- District: Kangra
- Tehsil: Baijnath
- Elevation: 1,404 m (4,606 ft)

Languages
  - Official: Hindi, English
- Time zone: UTC+5:30 (IST)
- PIN: 176 077
- Telephone code: 91-1894

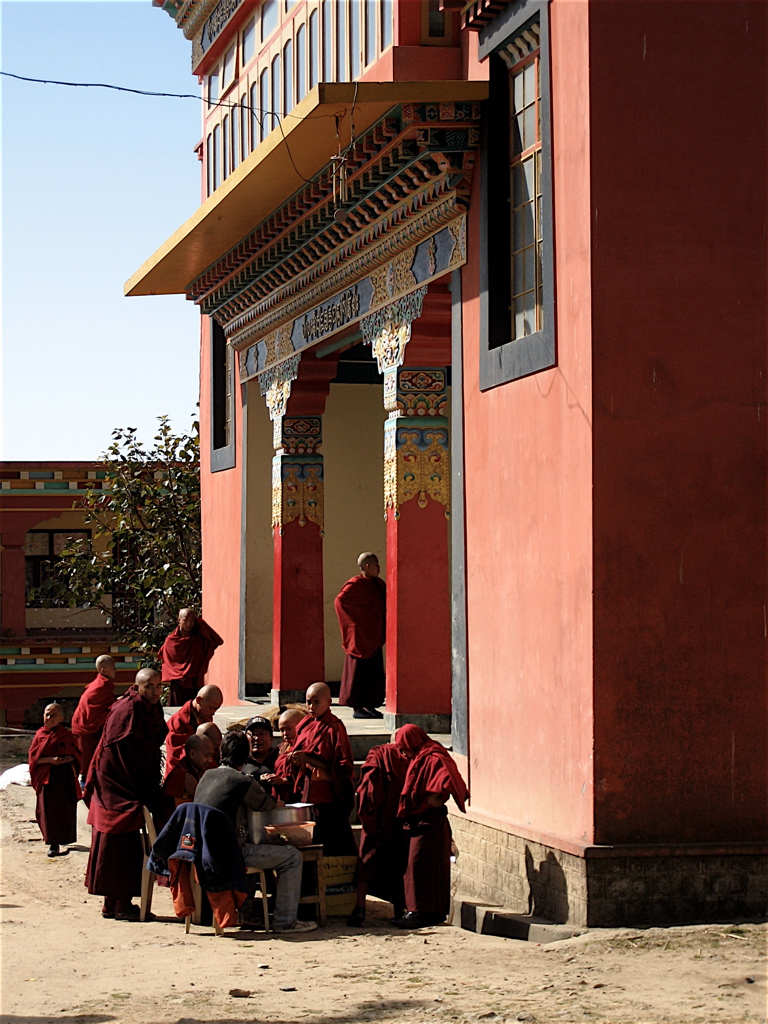
Monks in Bir Tibetan Colony, 2008

Bir Tibetan Colony is a Tibetan refugee settlement in the Himalayan village of Chowgan adjacent to the town of Bir, in the north Indian state of Himachal Pradesh. It was established in the early 1960s by Chokling Rinpoche following the exile of the Dalai Lama and other refugees from Tibet.

The town of Bir and the Tibetan Colony house several Tibetan monasteries and their support facilities representing the Nyingma school, the Karma Kagyu school, and the Sakya school. The Tibetan Colony has a Tibetan handicraft centre, a Tibetan Children's Village school (Suja), and a branch of the Tibetan Medical and Astrological Institute (Men-Tsee-Khang), as well as a medical clinic. The Deer Park Institute is in Bir's Tibetan Colony, as is also a number of restaurants, shops, cafés, and guest houses.

== Geography ==
Bir Tibetan Colony is located in the western half of the village of Chowgan, on the southwestern edge of the town of Bir, in the Tehsil (administrative subdivision) of Baijnath, in Kangra district, in the Indian state of Himachal Pradesh.

Bir Tibetan Colony is located east-southeast of Dharamshala and is three hours by bus from Dharamshala. It is situated 6 km south of the popular paragliding destination of Billing, on the way to the Thamsar Pass leading to Bara Bhangal.

Geologically, Bir is situated in the Dhauladhar Range of the foothills of the Indian Himalayas.

The nearest railway station is Ahju, on the narrow-gauge line running between Pathankot and Jogindernagar via Kangra.

Road access to Bir Tibetan Colony is from the Bir Road turnoff (signposted) on NH20, approximately midway between Baijnath and Jogindernagar.

== Population ==
The population of Bir Tibetan Colony is primarily Tibetan refugees, but there are also a number of Indian families and a small community of international expatriates and long-term visitors. It is only the Bir Tibetan Colony itself that is primarily settled by Tibetan refugees; the population of the town of Bir proper is almost entirely Indian.

The majority of the Tibetan refugees based in Bir originally came from the Kham region of southeastern Tibet, but many of the refugees living in the colony today were born in India, and the population continues to diversify.

== Institutions and attractions ==
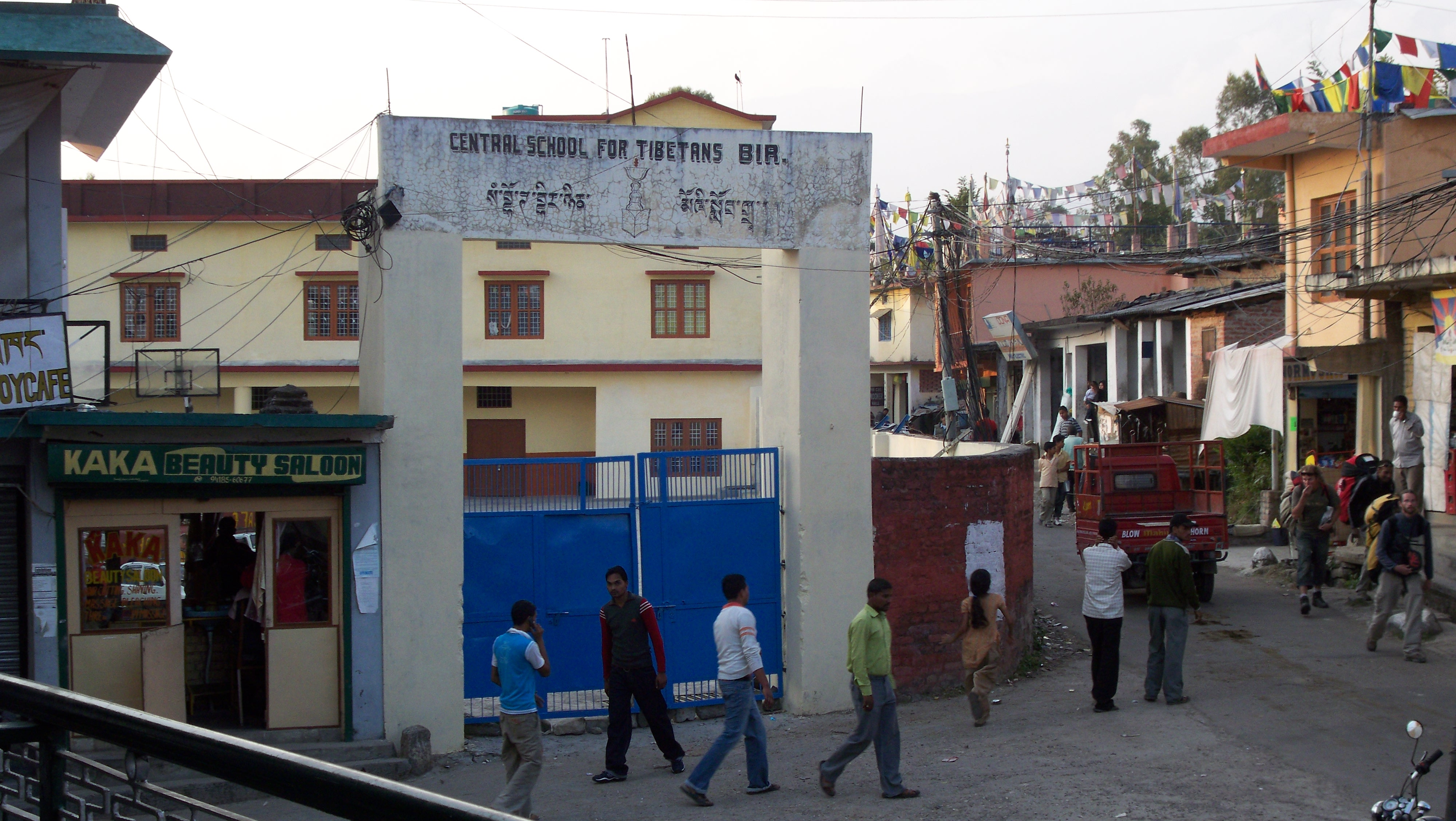
Central school on a main street in Chowgan

There are several institutions in Bir that attract tourists, students, volunteers and other visitors from around India and from abroad:

A branch of Palyul Monastery of the Nyingma school's Penor Rinpoche was established in Bir Tibetan Colony, and Rigo Tulku Rinpoche is its Khenpo.

The Deer Park Institute is a "centre for the study of classical Indian wisdom traditions" established by Dzongsar Khyentse Rinpoche in March 2006 under the patronage of the Dalai Lama.

Chokling Gompa is the monastery of Neten Chokling Rinpoche, a reincarnate lama in the Nyingma tradition of Tibetan Buddhism and the director of the film Milarepa (2006). Chokling Gompa is a point of architectural interest, with a grand prayer hall and a picturesque stupa.

There are also several other monasteries and temples in the Tibetan Colony, and the Tibetan herbal clinic (Men-Tsee-Khang) and handicraft centre also serve as tourist attractions. The Sherab Ling and Chokling monasteries are in the vicinity. The Dzongsar Institute (a Tibetan Buddhist monastic college) is in nearby Chauntara.

Dharmalaya is an Indian charitable society (NGO) based in Bir, which is "devoted to education, service, and compassionate living, with a practical focus on sustainable village development, contemplative service-learning, and immersive ecotourism."

== In popular culture ==
Bir was the setting for Khyentse Norbu's first feature film, The Cup (Phörpa) (1999), which was based on events that took place in Bir during the 1998 World Cup final and was shot on location in Bir.
