= Nargu Wildlife Sanctuary =

Sanctuary located in Mandi District of Himachal Pradesh, India

- IUCN category IV (habitat/species management area)
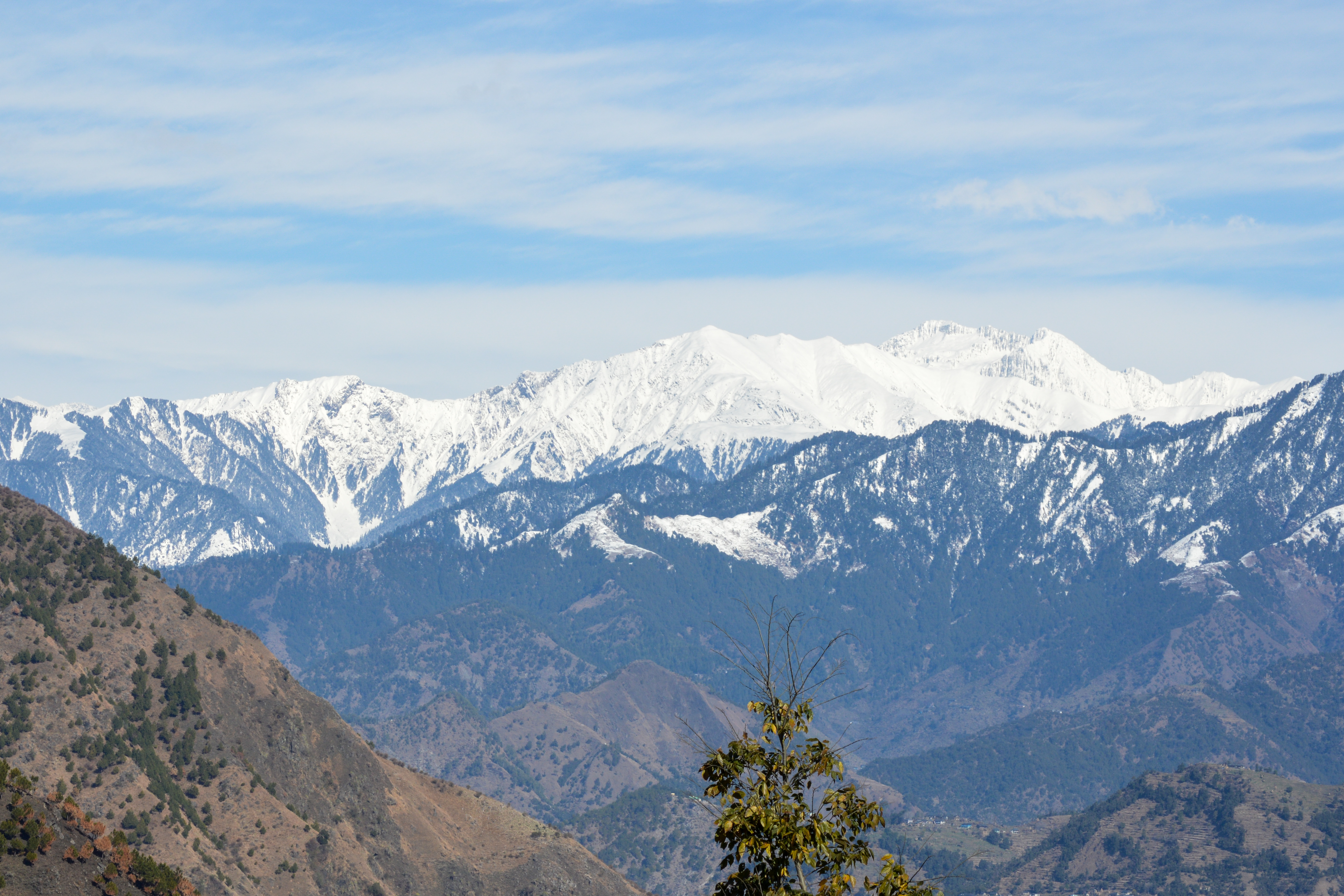
- Nargu WLS from across the Uhl River

- Location within Himachal Pradesh Location within India
- Interactive map of Nargu Wildlife Sanctuary
- Location: Barot Valley, Mandi District of Himachal Pradesh
- Nearest city: Mandi
- Area: 132.3731 km^{2} (51.1095 sq mi)

Nargu Wildlife Sanctuary lies on the east side of the Uhl River in Mandi District of Himachal Pradesh. It was notified in 1999 and covers an area of 132.37 km^{2} (51.11 sq mi). The slopes of the sanctuary are covered with Alpine forest. It is home to various species of animals and birds.

== Geography ==
The sanctuary was notified by the Government of Himachal Pradesh on 23 October 1999 with an area of 278.0 km^{2} (107.3 sq mi). On 29 November 2013, due to rationalisation of the boundaries the area was reduced to 132.3731 km^{2} (51.1095 sq mi). The sanctuary is located within the geocoordinates: North 32°06′49″N 76°56′35″E, East 31°52′54″N 77°04′50″E, South 31°48′42″N 77°02′41″E, West 32°01′39″N 76°51′31″E. The sanctuary falls under the Kullu Forest Division, Kullu district although it is located in Barot Valley of Mandi district.

== Flora and fauna ==
The flora includes deodar, fir, kharsu oak, prunus, maple, and fig trees. Wildlife includes the common leopard, barking deer, black bear, jackal, and flying squirrel. Key birds are the Himalayan monal, white-crested kalij, chukar, black partridge, and grey partridge. Common reptiles are snakes and monitor lizards.

== Access ==
- Airport:- Closest Airport is Kangra Airport (100 km), Alternatively Bhuntar (Kullu) (109 km)
- Railway:- The closest Railhead is at Jogindernagar (30 km )
- Road:- The sanctuary is well connected by road from Jogindernagar (30 km) and Mandi (50 km) cities.
