= Jogindernagar =

Joginder Nagar The City of Powerhouses
- Municipality and Hill Station
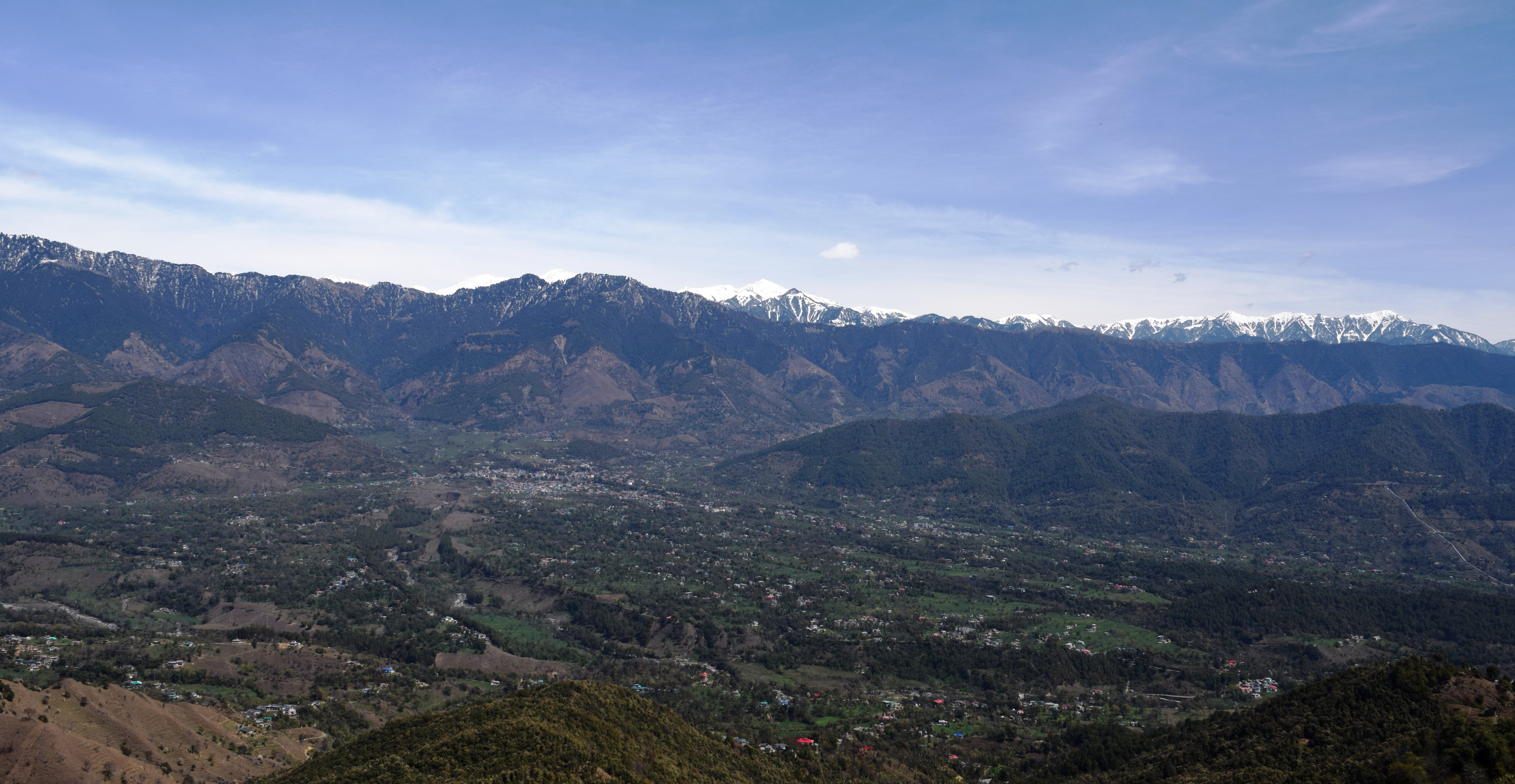
- Jogindernagar and its suburbs, seen from Siqandar Dhar
- Nicknames: Electric City, City of Powerhouses
- Location in Himachal Pradesh, India Joginder Nagar (India)
- Coordinates: 31.988723°N 76.79155°E
- Country: India
- State: Himachal Pradesh
- District: Mandi
- Nearest city: Baijnath
- Formation: 1925
- Founder: Joginder Sen
- Named for: King of Mandi

Government
  - Body: Municipal council
  - MLA: Prakash Rana (Bharatiya Janata Party)

Area
  - Total: 107 sq mi (278 km^{2})
- Elevation: 4,000 ft (1,220 m)

Population (2022)
  - Total: 108,122
  - Rank: 20 in state
  - Density: 1,010/sq mi (389/km^{2})

Languages
  - Official: Hindi
  - Regional: Mandeali
- Time zone: UTC+5:30 (IST)
- PIN: 175015
- Telephone code: 1908
- Vehicle registration: HP-29
- Literacy: 87.86%
- Climate: Humid subtropical (Köppen)
- Avg. annual temperature: 18 °C (64 °F)
- Avg. summer temperature: 24 °C (75 °F)
- Avg. winter temperature: 10 °C (50 °F)
- Website: jogindernagar.com

Jogindernagar, or Jogindar Nagar ([dʒoːˈɡɪnd̪ər nəˈɡər]), is a municipality, and a sub district in Mandi district in the Indian state of Himachal Pradesh. Named after Raja Joginder Sen, the hill station is the terminus of the 163-kilometre-long (101 mi) Kangra Valley narrow-gauge railway. Jogindernagar is the third-largest city in the Mandi district and one of the largest urban agglomerations of Himachal Pradesh. The only city in Asia with three hydro-electric power stations, its nickname is "The City of Powerhouses".

Situated in the central Joginder Nagar Valley, the region is known for paragliding, trekking, mountain biking, camping and angling. The valley is known for its Ts: trolley, trout and train. In 2015, Jogindernagar was declared the first free Wi-Fi city in Himachal Pradesh.

== Etymology ==
Jogindernagar was named after the Mandi king Raja Joginder Sen. Its original name was Sukrahatti.

== History ==
In 1925, Raja Joginder Sen and Col. B. C. Batty planned a hydropower scheme near the village of Sukrahatti. Alexander Sanderson was chief engineer until December 1929, when he returned to England with the project half-completed. Narrow-gauge railway track was laid from Pathankot to Jogindernagar—about 150 kilometres (93 mi)—to carry heavy machinery transported from Britain. A haulage system was laid from the Shanan Power House site to Barot, where a reservoir was built on the Uhl River. After tunneling and piping the water several kilometres from the river to Jogindernagar, the 110-MW Shanan Power House was built by a team of engineers headed by Batty. It was the only hydroelectric project in northern India which fed undivided Punjab and Delhi.

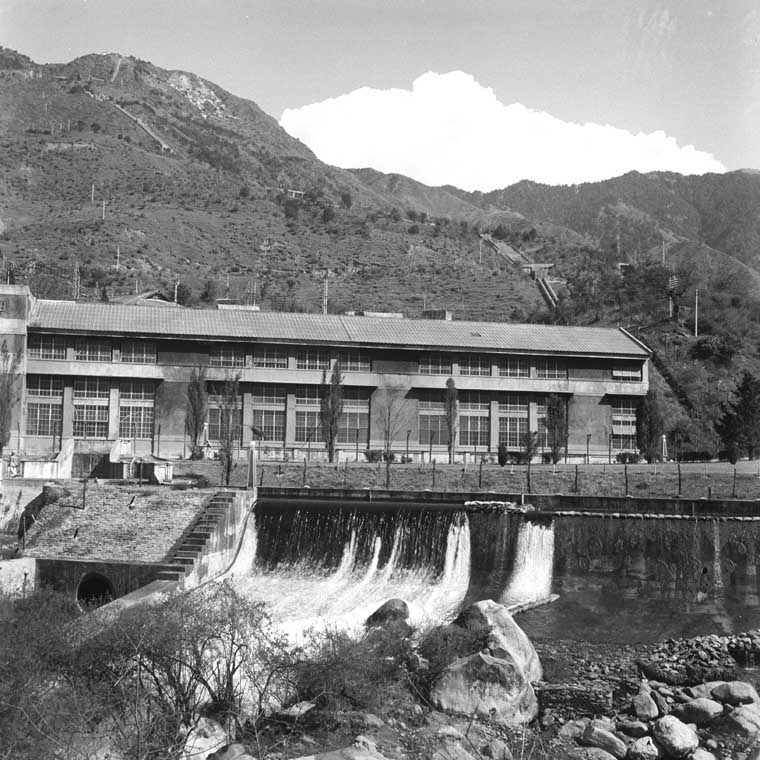
Shanan Power House in the mid-20th century

The hydroelectric scheme planned to build five power stations with water from the Uhl River. Water from the Shanan Power House was to be taken by tunnels 8 kilometres (5.0 mi) to adjoining Siyuri Dhar. A reservoir was to be built in the village of Chapprot to drive turbines at the base of Chapprot Hill in stage two of the project. However, the plan was abandoned after Batty's death.

During the 1960s, the Himachal Pradesh State Electricity Board revived the plan. Another set of turbines was added at Bassi (a small village at the bottom of Chapprot Hill) in 1970, and the 66-MW Bassi Power House was built. Despite the Bassi Power House's economy (since it was based on tailwater from the Shanan project), no further development was made until the beginning of the 21st century. Construction of the project's third stage, the 100-MW Uhl Stage III, is ongoing in the village of Chulla (near Tullah) with two reservoirs: one near Machhyal Lake and another in the village of Raktal (near Chulla).

Until the mid-20th century, Jogindernagar was northern India's largest potato market. The potato-growing valleys were not linked by roads; over 2,000 mules from the Lahaul and Spiti valleys transported potatoes from outlying areas to Jogindernagar, the only railhead in that part of the state. Potatoes from Mandi, Kullu and Lahaul and Spiti districts were brought there for transport to West Bengal.

== Rock salt ==
Jogindernagar was India's only supplier of rock salt, obtained from the Gumma and Drang mines. Residents of the Kullu Valley travelled for days to obtain the salt, crossing the high-altitude Bhubhu Pass (since the road network did not yet exist).

These mines were started in May 1963 and closed in January 2011, due to non-forest clearance from the environment and forest ministry and non-deposit of royalty by the company. However, after re-commissioning in March 2016, the rock salt mine was extracting around 1,500 tonnes of salt every year from Maigal, Darang and Gumma mines.

== Geography ==
Jogindernagar is in the central Joginder Nagar Valley, in the north-western Himalayas. Surrounded by mountains, it has an average elevation of 1,220 metres (4,000 feet). Jogindernagar's altitude ranges from 800 metres (2,600 ft) on the southern valley floor to 3,000 metres (9,800 ft) on the northern hilltops.

Its surrounding mountains are covered with dense pine forests. Rhododendron (burans, known locally as brah ka fool) and deodar trees are found at high-altitude locations such as Winch Camp, Jhatingri and Phuladhar. Jogindernagar is in a Zone V (very high earthquake-damage risk) region, and after-effects of the 1905 earthquake are still visible at the nearby Kila Karanpur fort.

== Climate ==
The climate is warm and temperate; summer is much rainier than winter. According to the Köppen climate classification, Jogindernagar has a humid subtropical climate (Cwa). Its average annual temperature is 18.6 °C (65.5 °F), and its average annual rainfall is 1,851 millimetres (72.9 in).

November is the driest month, with 25 millimetres (0.98 in) of rain. The wettest month is August, with an average of 781 millimetres (30.7 in). The warmest month is June, with an average temperature of 24.5 °C (76.1 °F); January is the coldest, with an average temperature of 9.1 °C (48.4 °F). The difference in precipitation between August and November is 756 millimetres (29.8 in), and the variation in temperature throughout the year is 42 °C (108 °F).

Winter temperature may fall to −3 °C (27 °F) in Jogindernagar and −10 °C (14 °F) at higher altitudes, which receive heavy snowfall from December to March; Jogindernagar receives occasional light snowfall, with the last snowfall witnessed in 2003 and 2026. Although summers are warm, the maximum temperature rarely exceeds 36 °C (97 °F); the record high is 39 °C (102 °F).

Climate data for Jogindernagar
Month	Jan	Feb	Mar	Apr	May	Jun	Jul	Aug	Sep	Oct	Nov	Dec	Year
Mean daily maximum °C (°F)	16.6 (61.9)	18.4 (65.1)	25.8 (78.4)	28.1 (82.6)	31.7 (89.1)	32.6 (90.7)	29.0 (84.2)	28.0 (82.4)	28.1 (82.6)	26.0 (78.8)	21.2 (70.2)	18.2 (64.8)	25.3 (77.6)
Daily mean °C (°F)	9.1 (48.4)	11.6 (52.9)	15.8 (60.4)	18.6 (65.5)	24.2 (75.6)	24.5 (76.1)	24.6 (76.3)	23.8 (74.8)	22.2 (72.0)	18.7 (65.7)	14.9 (58.8)	10.4 (50.7)	18.2 (64.8)
Mean daily minimum °C (°F)	3.7 (38.7)	4.9 (40.8)	8.8 (47.8)	14.1 (57.4)	18.7 (65.7)	19.5 (67.1)	20.2 (68.4)	20.6 (69.1)	18.3 (64.9)	14.3 (57.7)	8.6 (47.5)	4.6 (40.3)	13.0 (55.5)
Average precipitation mm (inches)	114 (4.5)	94 (3.7)	120 (4.7)	61 (2.4)	62 (2.4)	208 (8.2)	726 (28.6)	781 (30.7)	345 (13.6)	63 (2.5)	25 (1.0)	48 (1.9)	2,647 (104.2)
Source: Climate-Data.org, altitude: 1179m

== Demographics ==
=== Population ===
As per 2022 estimates, the population of the Jogindernagar sub district or tehsil is 108,122 including 214 urban and rural locations. The combined population of Vidhan Sabha constituency inclusive of two sub districts viz. Jogindernagar (108,122) and Lad Bharol (33,065) is 141,187.

According to the 2011 Census of India, the Jogindernagar sub district had a population of 84,470, of which 41,245 were male and 43,225 were female showing a population growth of 28 percent when compared to 2022 figure. While, the notified municipality had a population of 5,335 and is divided into seven wards, for which elections are held every five years.

=== Literacy ===
Jogindarnagar's literacy rate is 87.86 percent, higher than the Himachal Pradesh average of 82.80%. Male literacy is 92.63 percent, and female literacy is 82.99 percent.

=== Religion ===
The major religion is Hinduism; a small percentage of the population follows Islam, Sikhism, Christianity and Tibetan Buddhism. A Tibetan Buddhist community (including monks) lives in the nearby village of Chauntra.

=== Languages ===
The native language of the town is the Western Pahari variety of Mandeali and Kangri.

== Cityscape ==
The urban agglomeration (UA) including around 50 urban and suburban areas is spread across the slopy plains of Joginder Nagar valley within an area of 60 square kilometers. The combined population of Joginder Nagar UA is estimated at 70,000 as of 2026. Rest of the population of around 50,000 lies in steep hills and rural areas mostly in the form of villages.

=== Municipality Wards (0-3 km) ===
- Luxmi Bazaar
- College Area
- Samlot
- Upper Seri
- Lower Seri
- Shanan
- Garoru

=== Nearby Suburbs (2-6 km) ===
- Jhalwan
- Balakrupi
- Masoli
- Aarthi
- Jalpeher
- Dhelu
- Dheluhar
- Dohag
- Bharyara
- Harabagh
- Harganen
- Machyal
- Majharanu
- Ner Gharwasda
- Palhoon
- Dhrun
- Chattar
- Bassi
- Yora
- Jimjema
- Ghamrehar
- Majhwar
- Dart Bagla
- Banaee
- Dibhnoo
- Khuddar

=== Distant Suburbs (6-15 km) ===
- Bhararu
- Chauntra
- Bir Road
- Sarli
- Sukhabag
- Ahju
- Ladruhi
- Dakbadga
- Sainthal
- Kohra
- Bhaterh
- Sarohli
- Raja
- Sagnehr
- Tikroo
- Tikri Musehra
- Machkehr
- Talkehr
- Bhankher
- Badehr
- Bhatwara
- Matru
- Hardbheru

== Nearest cities and major transport hubs ==
- Mandi: 55 kilometres (34 mi)
- Chandigarh: 219 kilometres (136 mi)
- Shimla: 191 kilometres (119 mi)
- Delhi: 452 kilometres (281 mi)
- Palampur: 37 kilometres (23 mi)
- Pathankot: 151 kilometres (94 mi)
- Kotli: 45 kilometres (28 mi)
- Sarkaghat: 60 kilometres (37 mi)
- Nearest broad-gauge train station: Pathankot: 149 kilometres (93 mi)
- Nearest airport: Gaggal Airport, 75 kilometres (47 mi)

== Transport ==
=== Air ===
Jogindernagar's nearest airport is Gaggal Airport at a distance of 75 kilometers from the city center, officially known as Kangra Airport. Kullu–Manali Airport is in Bhuntar, 113 kilometres (70 mi) away.

=== Rail ===
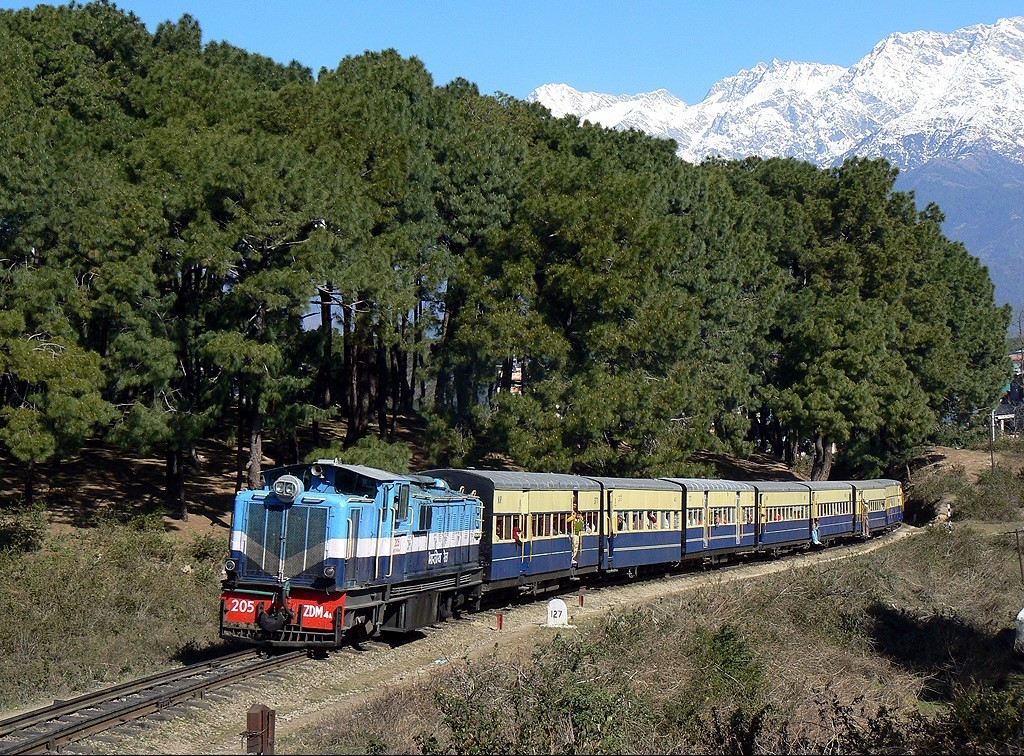
The Kangra Valley Railway in 2018

Joginder Nagar railway station is the terminus of the 163-kilometre-long (101 mi) Kangra Valley Railway, which runs to Pathankot. The nearest broad-gauge station is the Pathankot Junction railway station.

=== Road ===
National Highway 154 connects Jogindernagar with Mandi and Pathankot. This road is expected to be upgraded into a four-lane highway for which work has already started.

The Jogindernagar-Sarkaghat-Ghumarwin state highway 19 connects these three towns via a well maintained double lane highway running southwards.

== Education ==
The region lacks any known higher educational engineering and medical institutions leading to the migration of students to larger cities after schooling. However, some of the prominent institutions of education, medicine, and research in the region are:

- Rajiv Gandhi Memorial Government College, Joginder Nagar
- HP Revenue Training Institute, Masoli
- Research Institute in Indian Systems of Medicine (Herbal Garden and Museum), Joginder Nagar
- Government Circle Ayurvedic Hospital, Joginder Nagar
- College of Ayurvedic Pharmaceutical Sciences, Shanan
- Industrial Training Institute, Dohag
- Neelam College of Education, Zimzima Road
- Himalayan Group of Professional Institutions Nursing College, Joginder Nagar
- DAV Public School, Joginder Nagar
- Dayanand Bhartiya Public Senior Secondary School, Joginder Nagar
- Government Senior Secondary School (Boys), Joginder Nagar
- Government Senior Secondary School (Girls), Joginder Nagar
- Mount Maurya International School, Jhalwan
- New Crescent Senior Secondary Public School, Lower Garoru
- Ascent Public Senior Secondary School, Bridge Mandi
- La Montessari School, Dhelu

== Points of interest ==
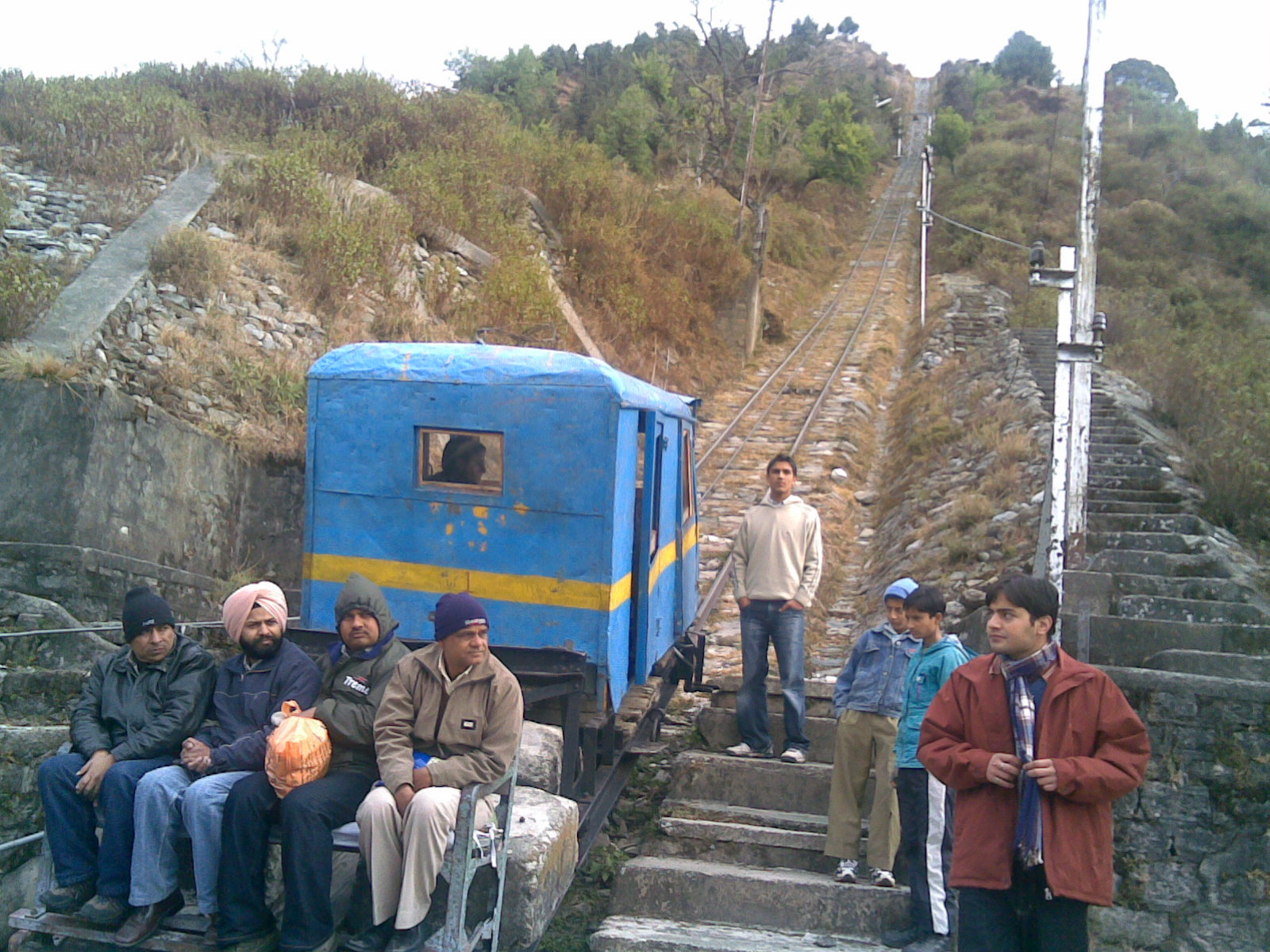
Funicular track

- Haulage trolley: Asia’s highest cable funicular railway climbs from the base station of Shanan Power House at 1,240 to 2,530 metres (4,070 to 8,300 ft) at its highest station of Head Gear.
- Winch Camp: The highest settlement in the Joginder Nagar Valley, at 2,450 metres (8,040 ft). A trolley track goes from Winch Camp to Head Gear (2550 meters), and the funicular descends to Barot. Currently non-operational, the 3-kilometre (1.9 mi) narrow-gauge track from Winch Camp to Head Gear is India's highest railway track.

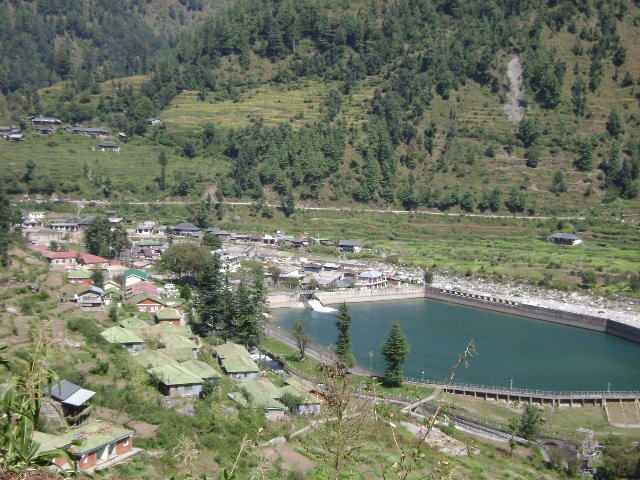
Hill town of Barot and reservoir in 2007

- Barot: Contains the main Uhl River reservoirs for the Shanan and Bassi hydroelectric projects.
- Bir-Billing: Bir is home to Tibetan Buddhist monasteries. At 2,430 metres (7,970 ft), Billing is a paragliding and hang gliding take-off spot. It hosted the 2015 Paragliding World Cup.
- Shanan Power House: India's first megawatt hydroelectric power project, commissioned in 1932
- Kangra Valley Railway: The narrow-gauge railway runs between Pathankot and Jogindernagar. Passing through two tunnels, the railway is on UNESCO's tentative list to be added to its mountain railways of India World Heritage Site.

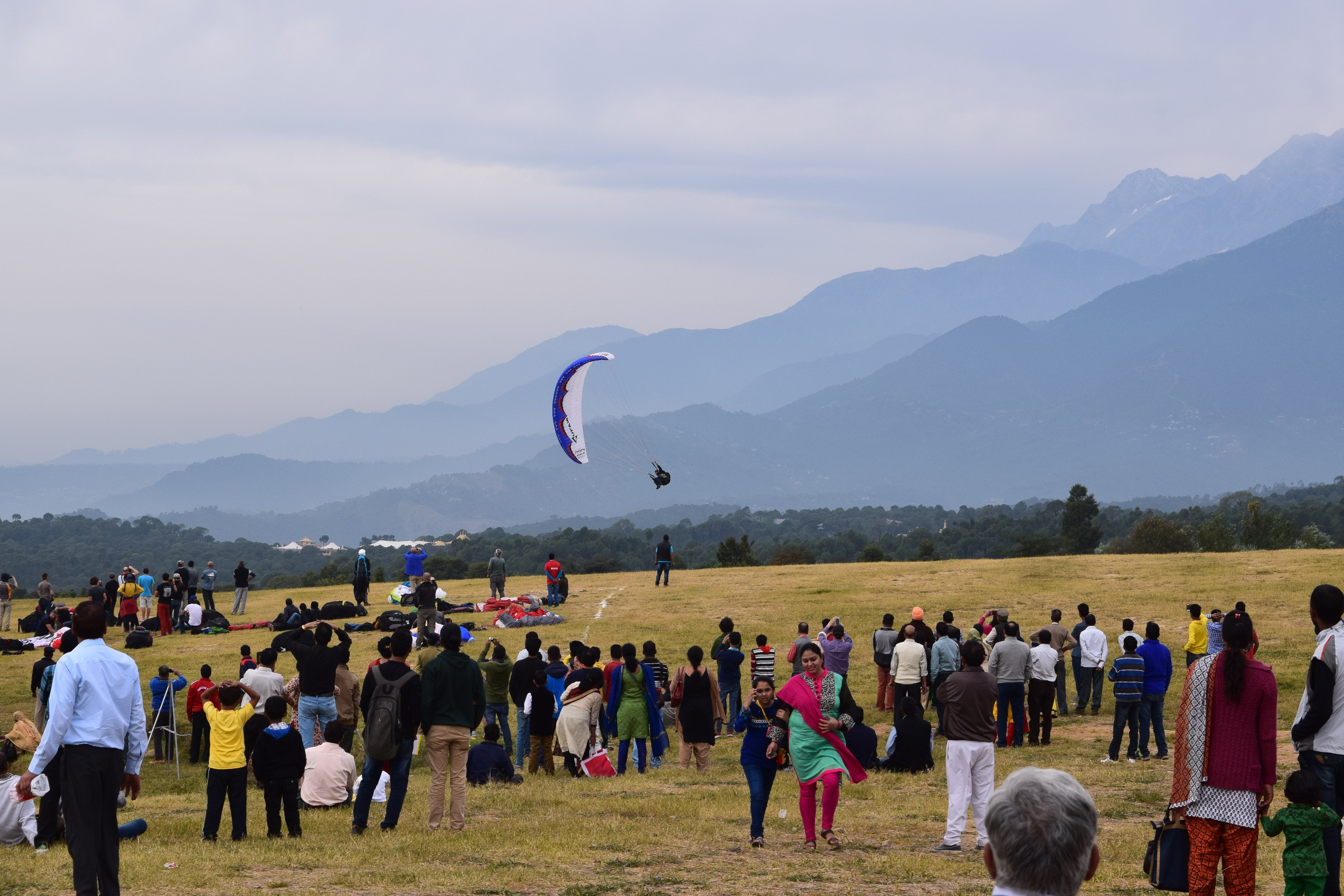
Paragliding World Cup 2015 at Bir-Billing

- Dehnasar Lake: High-altitude lake in the Dhauladhar range
- Banderi Temple and Kila Karanpur: Banderi Temple is on the hill to the north-west of Jogindernagar. Kila Karanpur is the abandoned fort of Raja Karan Sen, son of Raja Joginder Sen.
- Macchial Lake: Lake which is considered sacred
- Jhatingri: Hill resort at 2,050 metres (6,730 ft) with Himalayan cedar, known for camping and trekking, is the gateway to the Barot Valley.
- Herbal Garden and Museum: North India's largest herbal garden and institute for research of Ayurvedic medicine and plants
- Dhelu: Paragliding take-off spot for instruction and solo or tandem flights
- Fuladhar: Hilltop resort at 2,300 metres (7,500 ft), east of Jogindernagar, is known for paragliding, camping, trekking and 360-degree views of Joginder Nagar and Barot Valleys.
- Dzongsar Khyentse Monastery: One of six Buddhist monasteries and schools in nearby Chauntra village exemplifies Tibetan architecture and religious practice.
- Chaina Pass: Mountain pass at 2,730 metres (8,960 ft) connects Barot Valley at Rajgundha to Joginder Nagar Valley at Billing and the adjacent Kangra Valley.
- Bhubu Pass: This high-altitude pass, 2,900 metres (9,500 ft) high between Kullu and Jogindernagar, was the only link between the towns.
- Batty Pass: Named after B. C. Batty, this mid-altitude 2,530-metre (8,300 ft) pass parallels haulage rail track to connect Jogindernagar Valley (near Winch Camp) to Barot Valley at Headgear.

== Notable residents ==
- Ram Swaroop Sharma, Former Member of Parliament from Mandi
- Gulab Singh Thakur, former Himachal Pradesh speaker and cabinet minister
- Prakash Rana, politician and a multi-millionaire industrialist
- Sawan Barwal, Asian Games 2026 Silver Medallist in Marathon, and a national record holder of long distance running

== Gallery ==
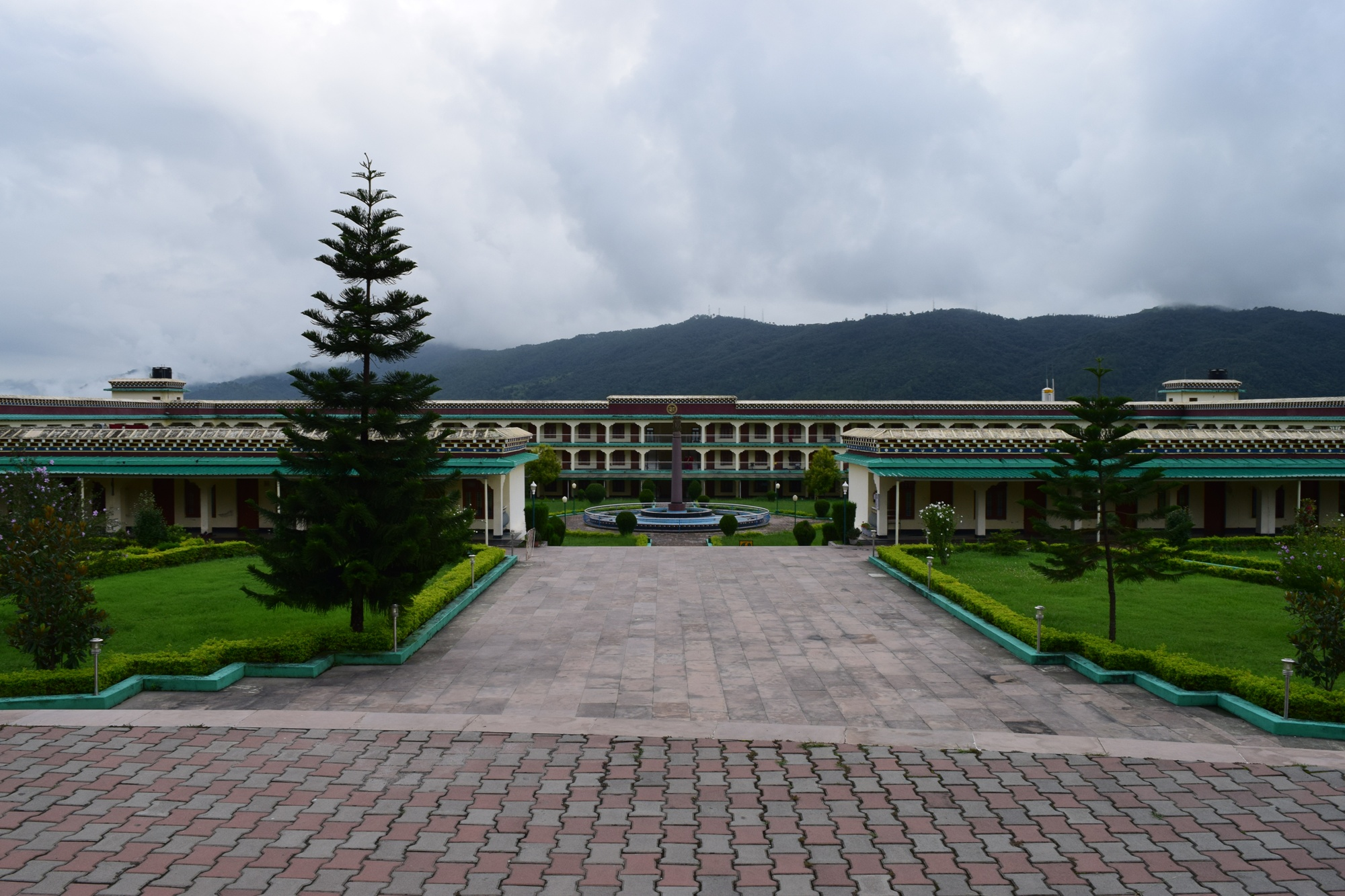
Dzongser Khyentse Monastery in 2014

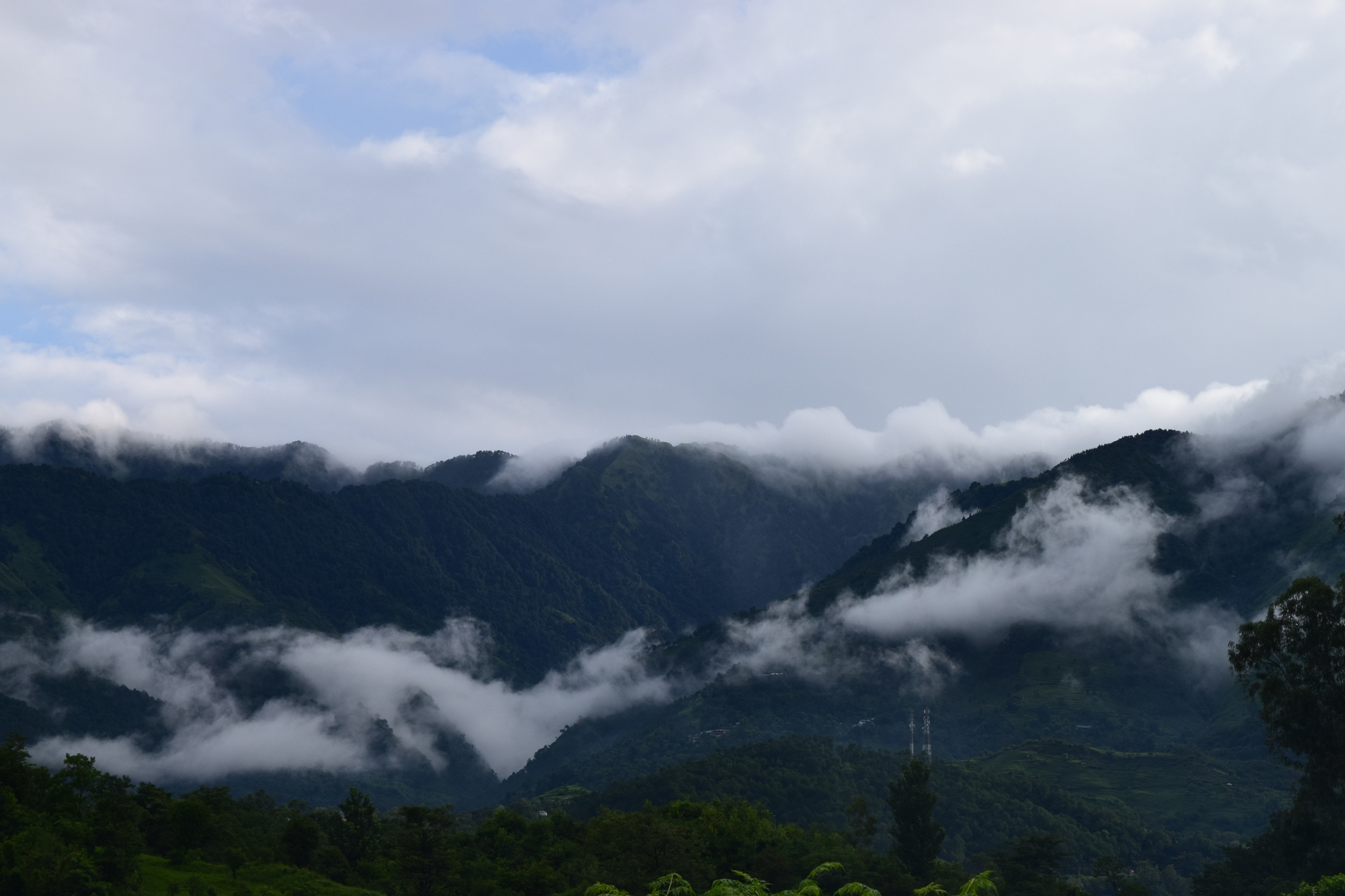
Mountains engulfed in monsoon clouds

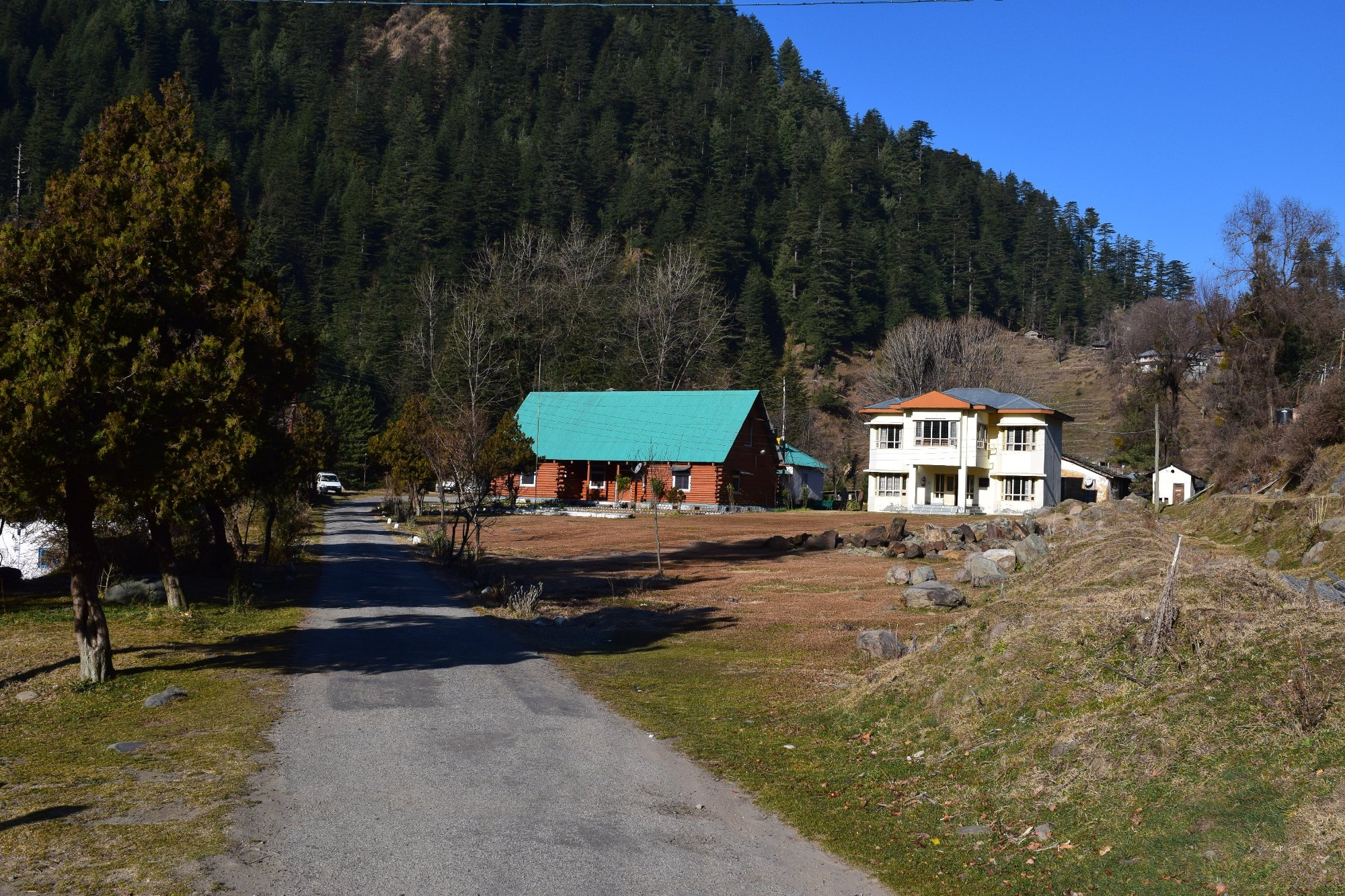
Sylvan Retreat, a British-era guest house in Barot

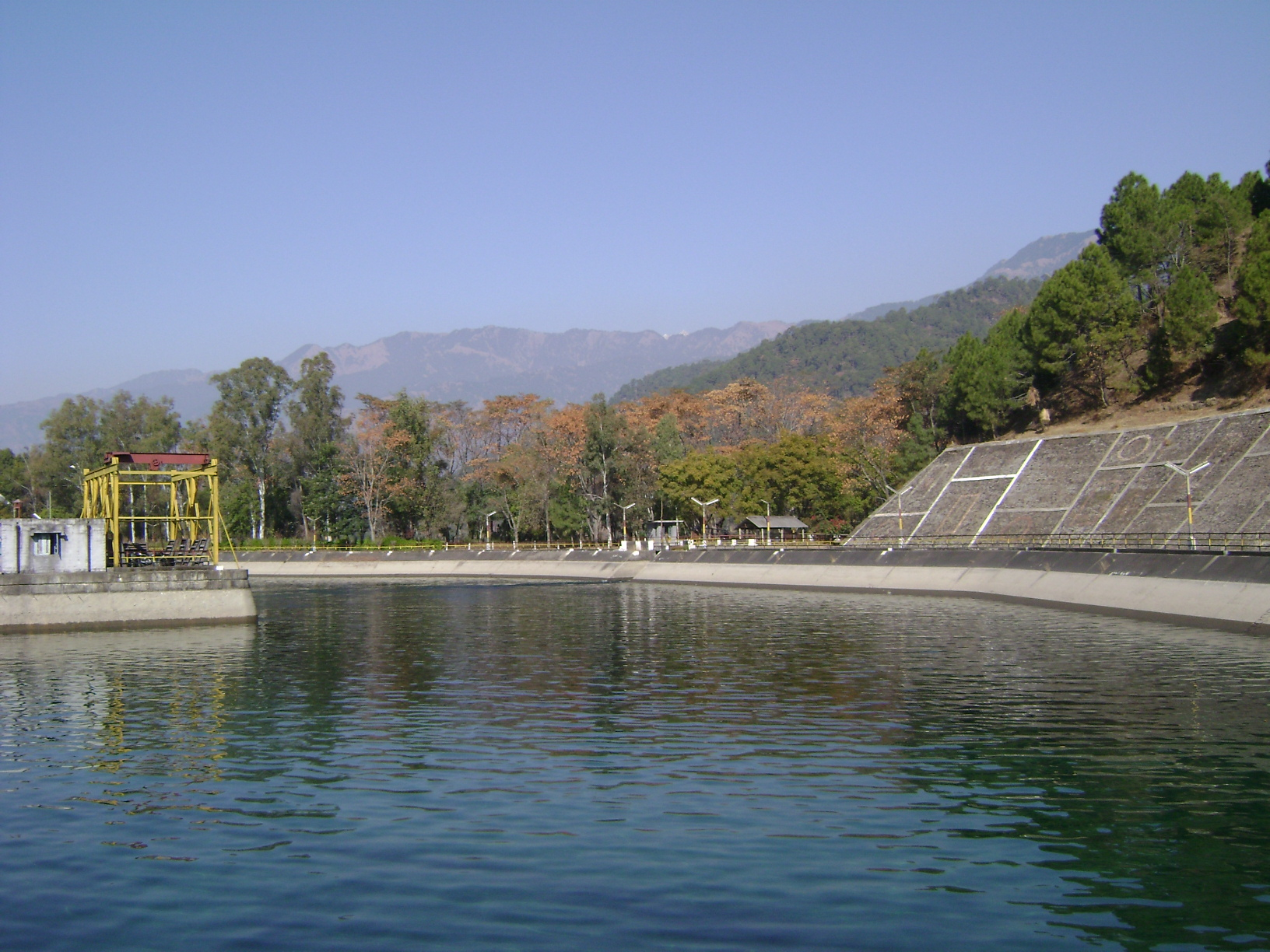
Chaprot reservoir for the Bassi power house

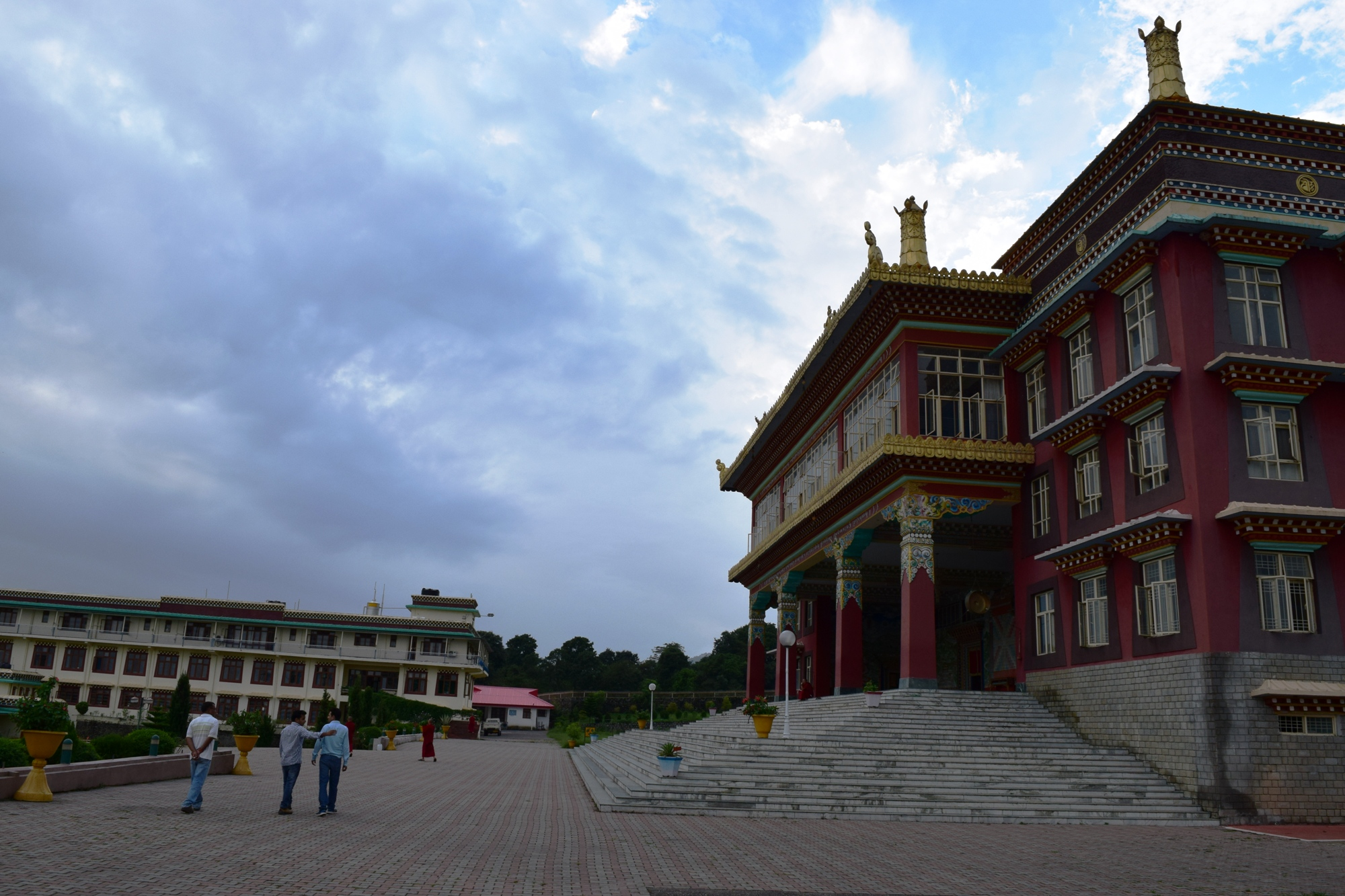
Buddhist monastery in Chauntra

== Fun facts ==
- Joginder Nagar-Pathankot railway line is the longest one meter narrow gauge track in the world. It is on the tentative list of UNESCO World Heritage sites.
- Joginder Nagar has the highest funicular railway in Asia at around 2500 meters, higher than Switzerland's highest at Niesenbahn (2336 meters). It is one of the highest functional funiculars in the world currently.
- Commissioned in 1932, Shanan Power House is Himachal's first hydroelectric power project, and one of the oldest hydro electric projects in India which fed undivided Punjab, and Lahore before independence.
- The town has three operational large hydroelectric powerhouses: Shanan (110MW), Bassi (60MW), Uhl-Stage 3 (100MW). These three powerhouses generate over 500 crores revenue annually. Fourth stage is planned at Thana Plaun (191 MW) on Joginder Nagar-Kotli road.
- 8471 m long Head Race Tunnel of Uhl Stage 3 is among India's longest hydroelectric tunnels.
- The non-functional 3 kilometers railway track between Winch Camp (2450 meters) and Head Gear (2550) funicular stations laid in 1920's is higher than Ghum railway station (2258 meters), India's highest railway track currently.
- Joginder Nagar's Herbal Garden is north India's largest herbal garden.
