= Chauntra, Himachal Pradesh =

Chauntra Laka Bhanghal Lower Chauntra
- Town
- Location in Himachal Pradesh, India Chauntra (India)
- Coordinates: 32°00′53″N 76°44′05″E
- Country: India
- State: Himachal Pradesh
- District: Mandi

Languages
  - Official: Hindi
- Time zone: UTC+5:30 (IST)
- PIN: 175032
- Telephone code: 1908
- Nearest city: Joginder Nagar
- Lok Sabha constituency: Mandi
- Vidhan Sabha constituency: Jogindernagar

Chauntra is a small market town in the state of Himachal Pradesh in northern India located along National Highway 20 (Updated 154) which connects Pathankot (in Punjab) to Mandi. It is also home to a Tibetan refugee community consisting of a settlement, several monasteries, and two schools. It is an important developmental block of Mandi district. Situated near to Joginder Nagar this town is very much suitable for tea growing.

== Geography ==
The town stands at an altitude of about 4,250 feet (1,300 m) above sea level and is lined by the Dhauladhar range in the north. The range includes the famous paragliding spot of Billing which has hosted several international paragliding competitions. A small river, Bajgad Khad, on the east side of the town originates from nearby Gunher in the north and runs south towards Bhaterh in the south. The landscape slopes slightly to the south with terraced fields towards what is called Lower Chauntra (which includes small rural villages of Bhaterh and Sainthal). Another notable land feature is the tea field, which once covered a good portion of the area where the Tibetan settlement is now located, although only a small portion of it now remains.

== Tibetan Community ==
The Tibetan refugees, mainly from the Kham region of Tibet, settled in Chauntra in the 1970s set up two small settlements, colloquially called 'Khang-sarma' and 'Khang-nyingma' (literally 'of new houses' and 'of old houses'). The original settlers consisted of about sixty families. The settlement at present has two Tibetan schools, Sambhota Chauntra and TCV Chauntra. In recent years, the settlement has seen the establishment of several monasteries such as Bhumang Jampaling (of Drikung Kagyu sect) and Zabsang Choekhor Ling (of Nyingma sect). There is also the monastic college, Dzongsar Khyentse Chökyi Lodrö Institute (better known as Dzongsar Shedra), the college holds a sizable amount monastic population.
