= Shimla =

Capital of Himachal Pradesh, India

Shimla Śimlā Simla
- State capital
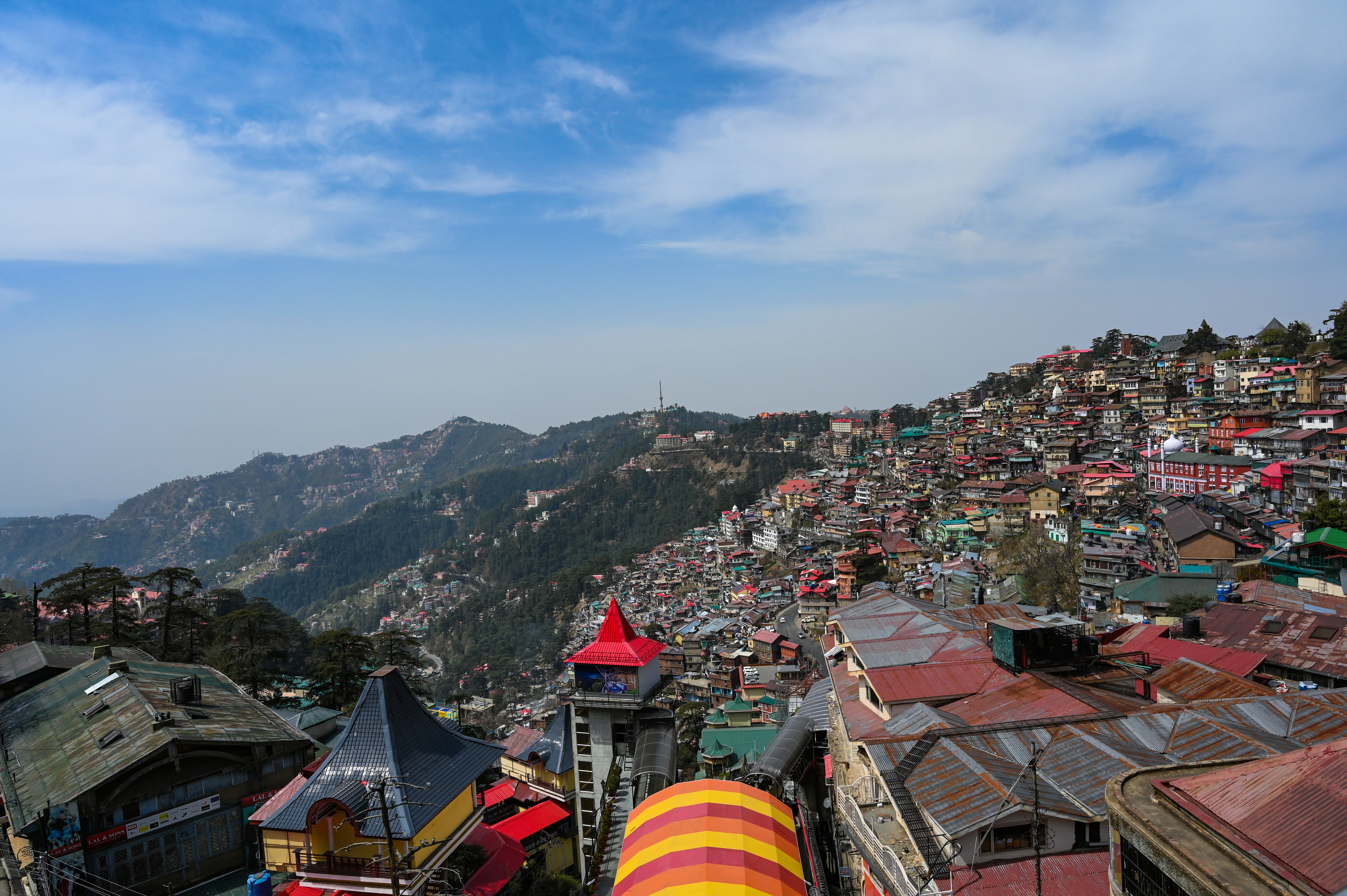
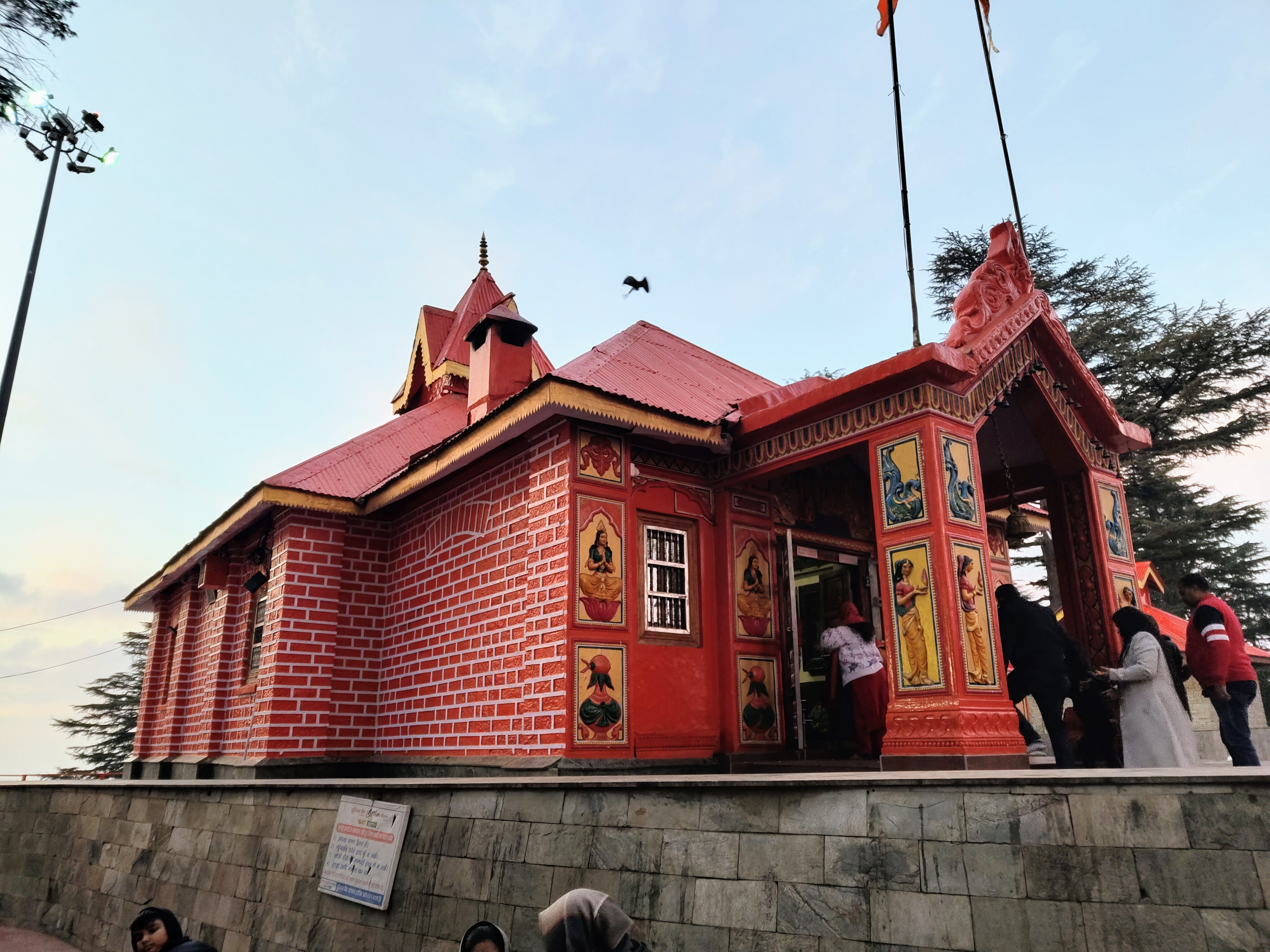
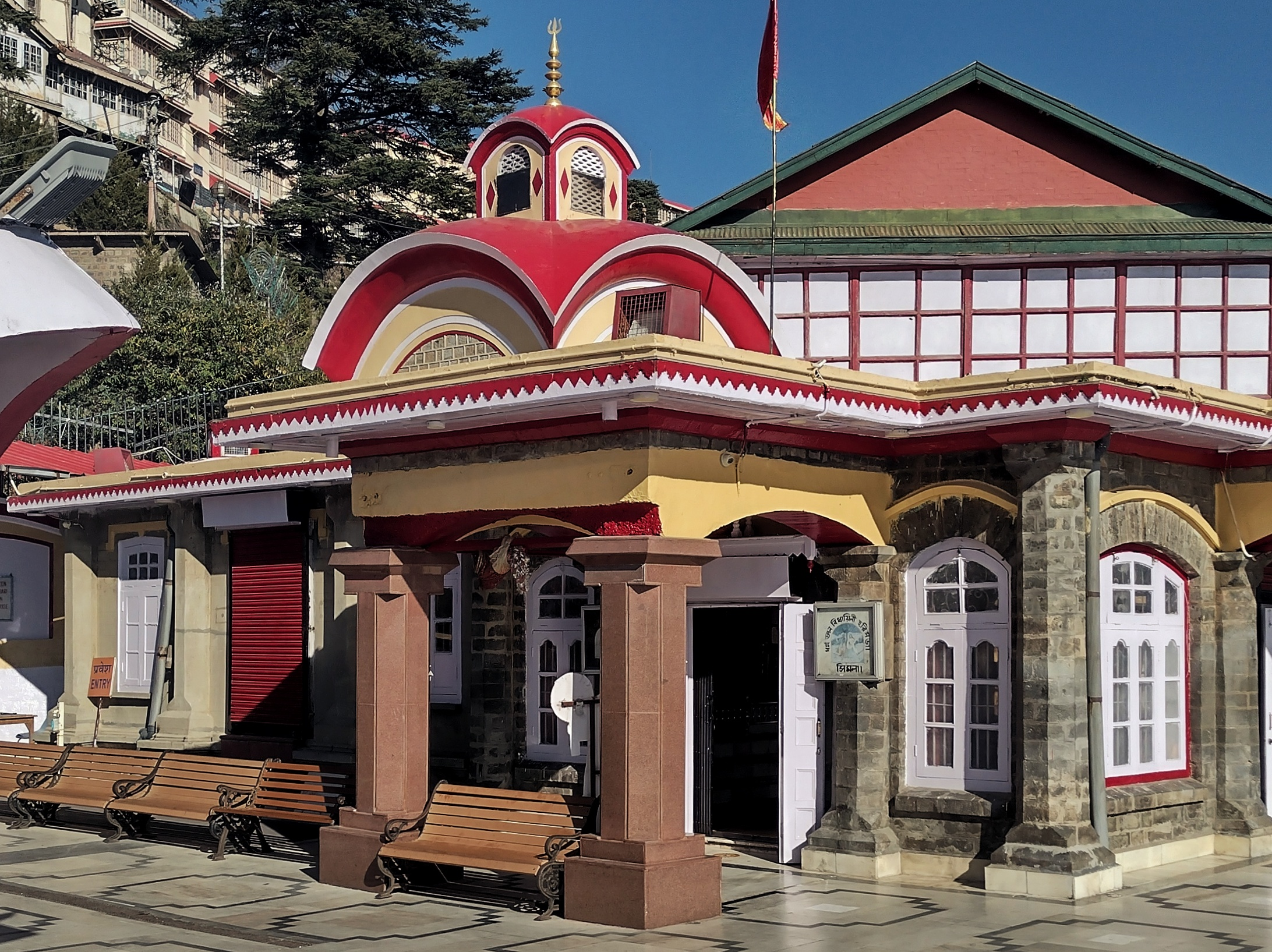
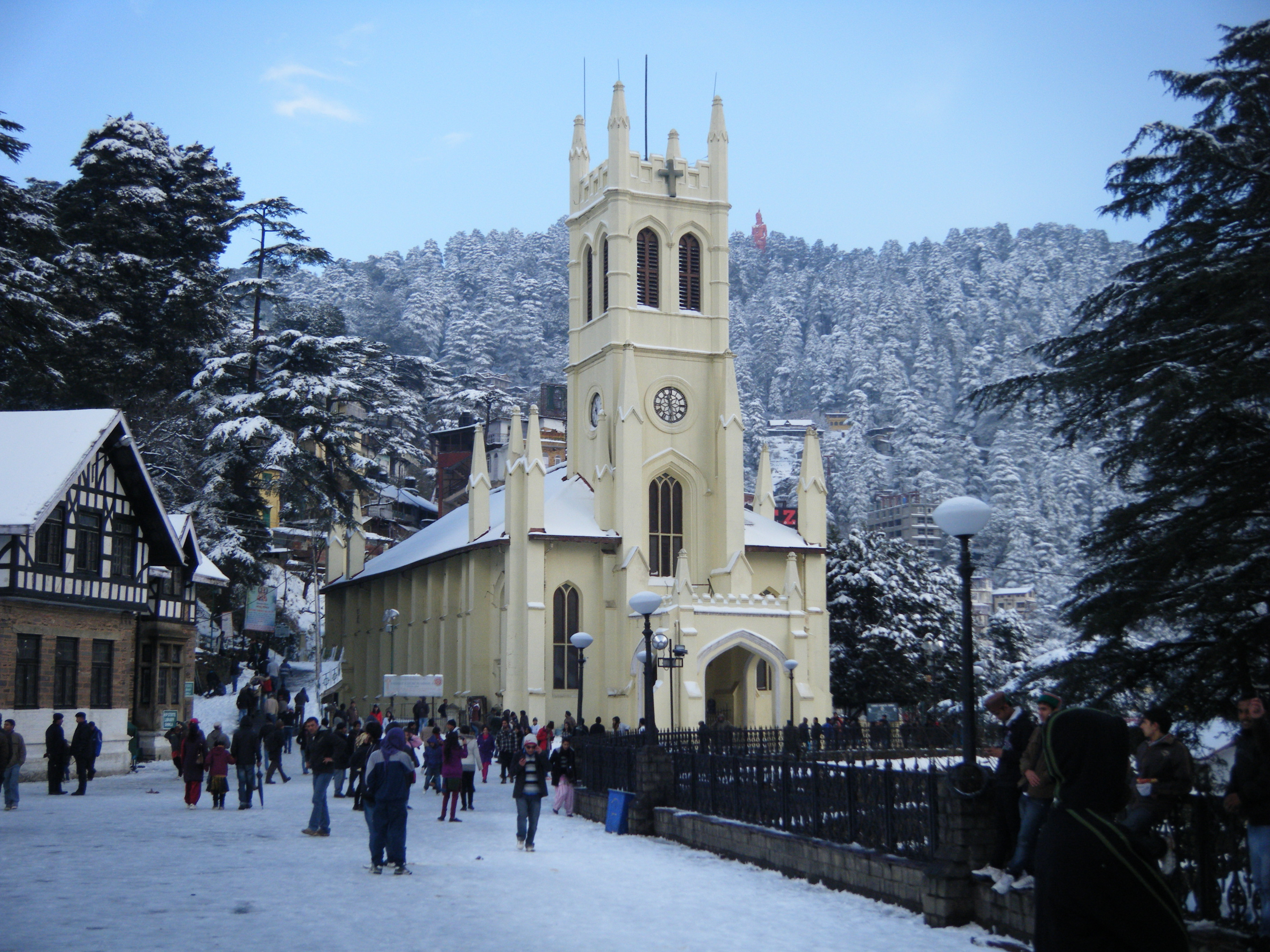
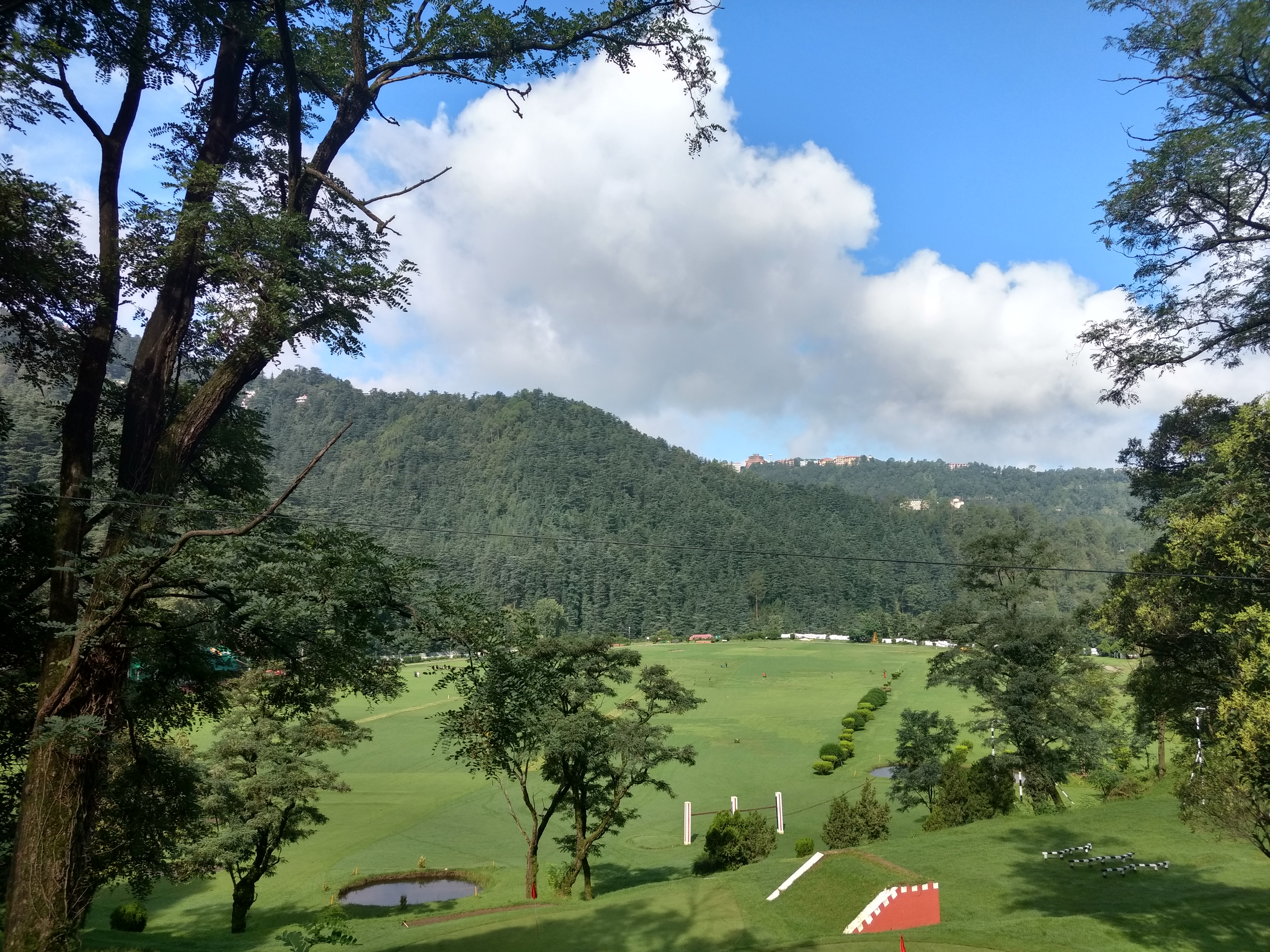
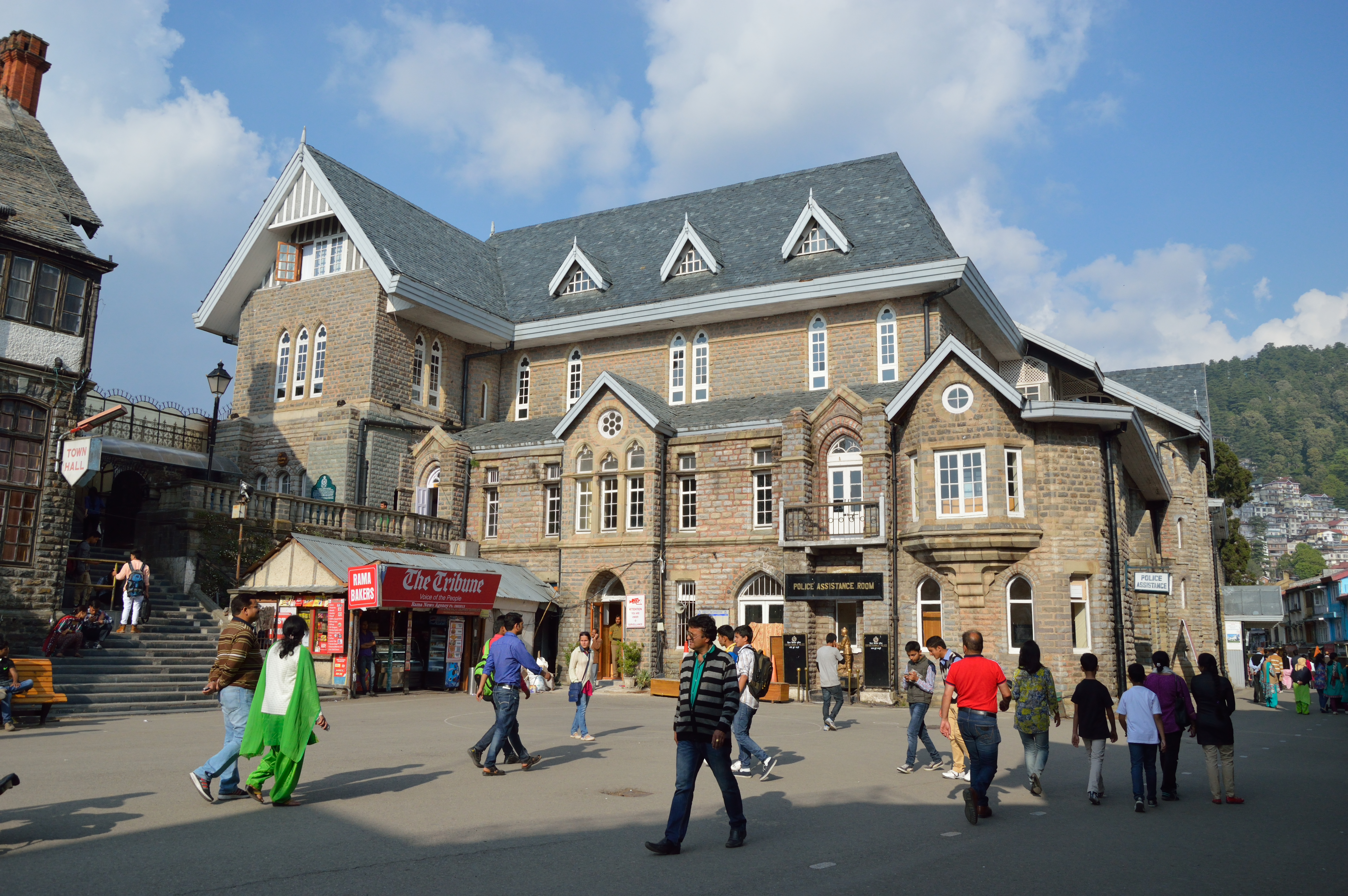
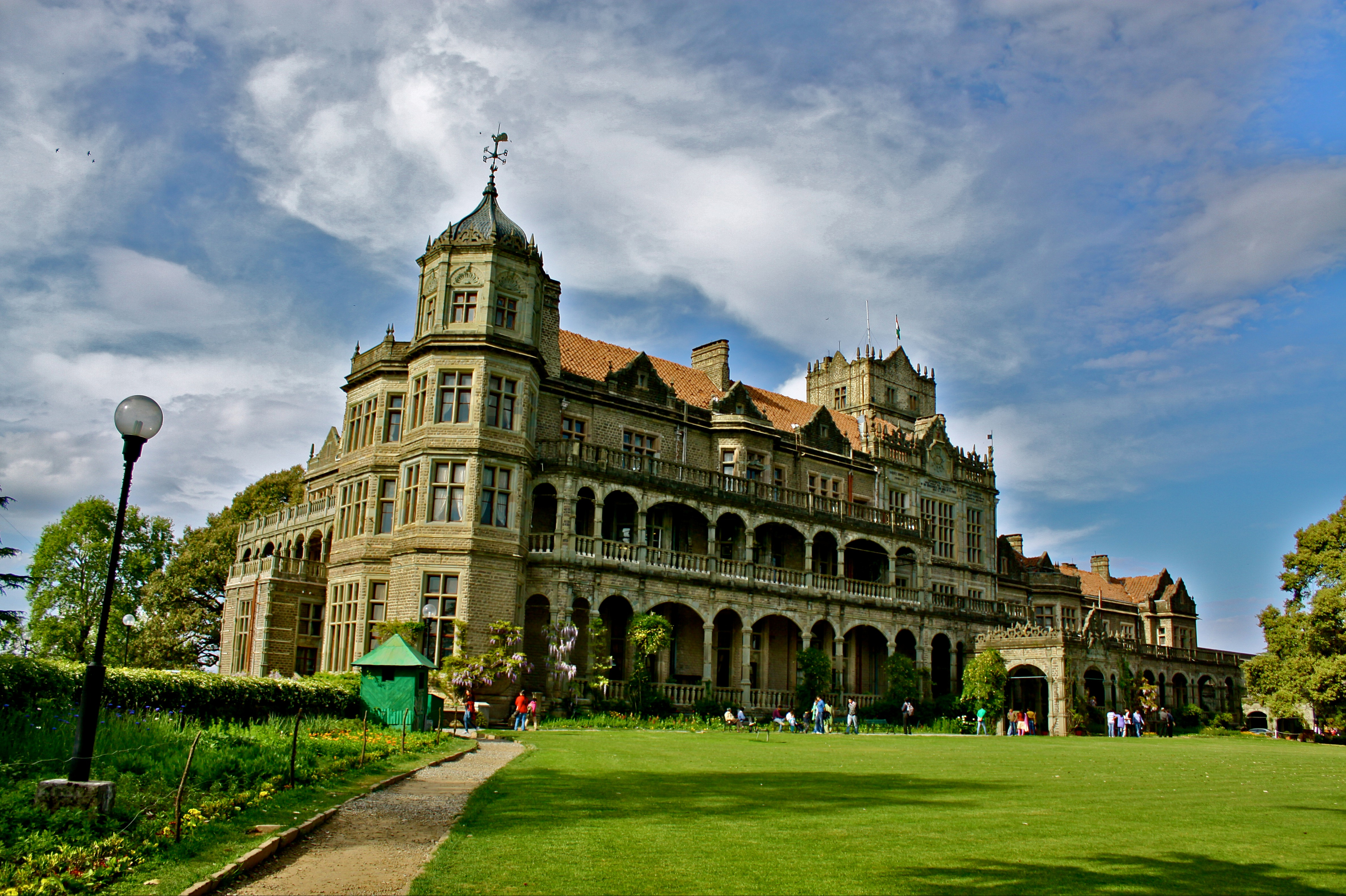
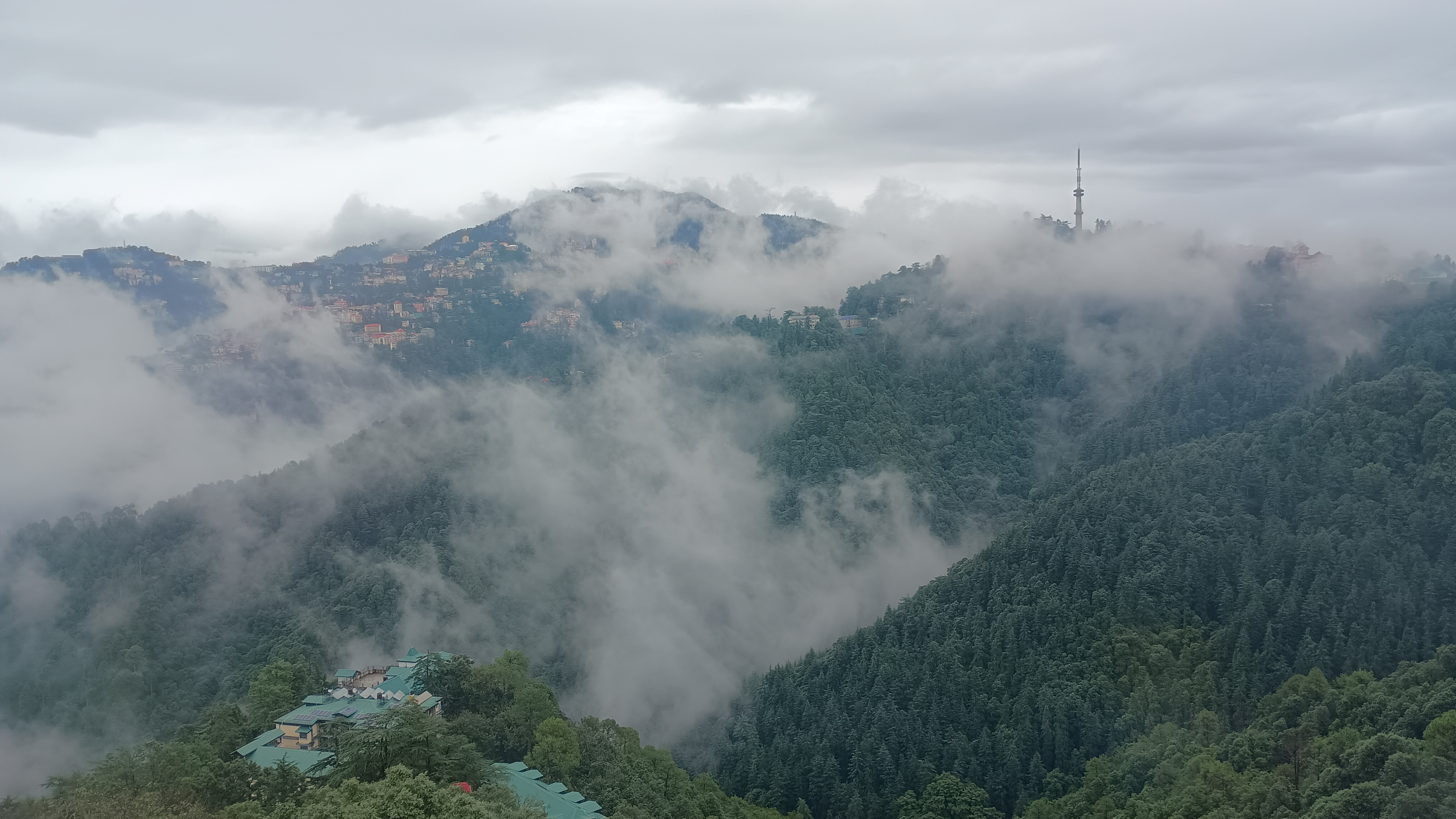
- Shimla city centre's panoramic view Jakhu Temple Kali Bari Temple Christ Church Annadale Gaiety Theatre Viceregal Lodge Shimla hills during monsoon
- Nicknames: Queen of Hills; City of Seven Hills
- Location within Himachal Pradesh Location within India Location within Asia
- Coordinates: 31°6′12″N 77°10′20″E
- Country: India
- State: Himachal Pradesh
- District: Shimla
- Named for: Shyamala

Government
  - Type: Municipal Corporation
  - Body: Shimla Municipal Corporation
  - Mayor: Surender Chauhan (INC)

Area
  - State capital: 35.34 km^{2} (13.64 sq mi)
  - Metro: 36.47 km^{2} (14.08 sq mi)
- Elevation: 2,376 m (7,795 ft)

Population (2011)
  - State capital: 169,578
  - Rank: 1st in Himachal Pradesh, 274th in India
  - Density: 4,798/km^{2} (12,430/sq mi)
  - Metro: 171,640
  - Metro density: 4,706/km^{2} (12,190/sq mi)

Languages
  - Official: Hindi
  - Additional Official: Sanskrit
  - Regional: Mahasu Pahari (Keonthali)
- Time zone: UTC+5:30 (IST)
- PIN: 171 001
- Telephone code: 91 177 XXX XXXX
- ISO 3166 code: ISO 3166-2
- Vehicle registration: HP-01, HP-02, HP-03, HP-07, HP-63
- UN/LOCODE: IN SLV
- Climate: Cwb
- Website: shimlamc.hp.gov.in

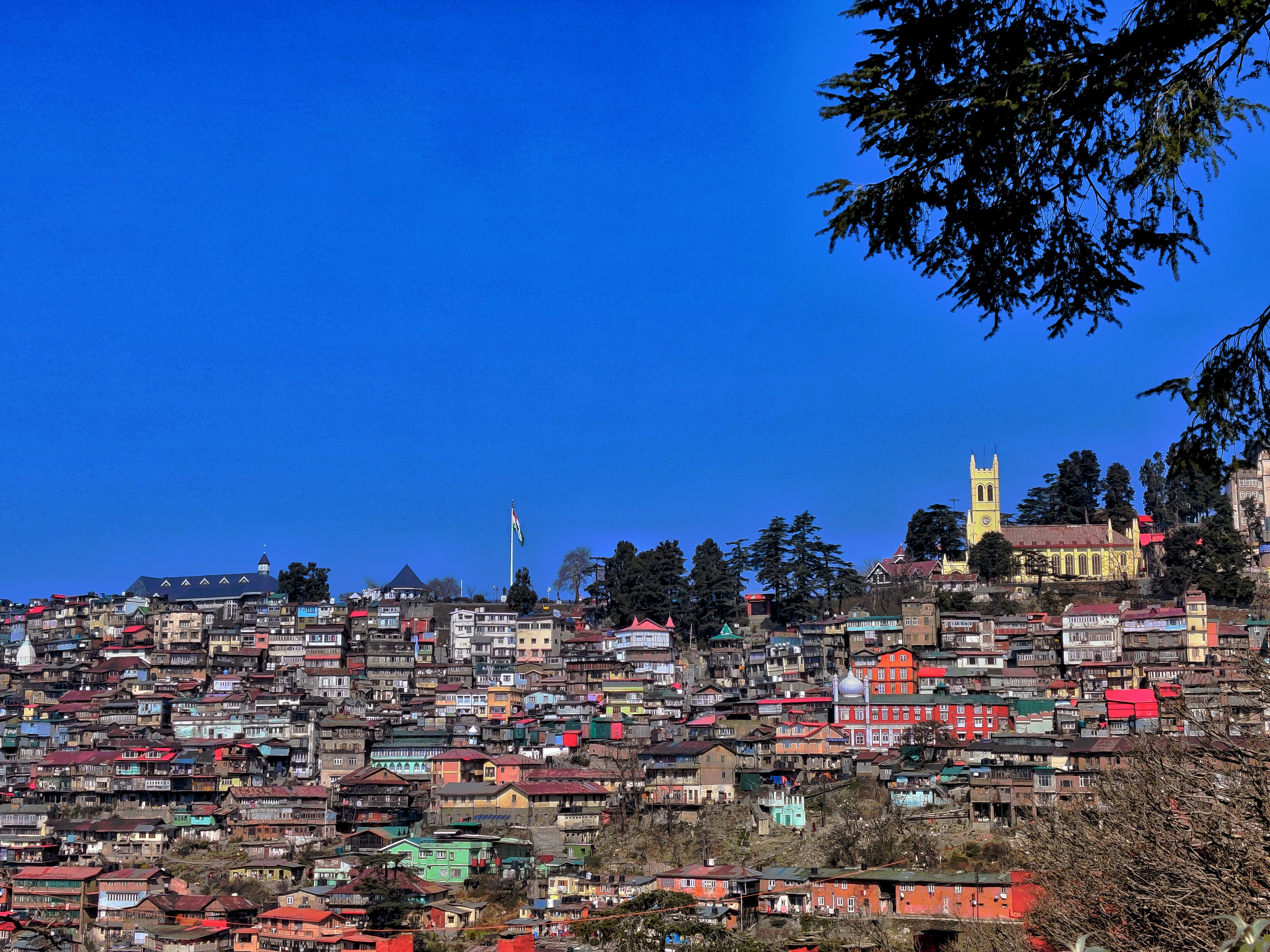
Christ Church of Shimla captured with a scenic view of the surroundings

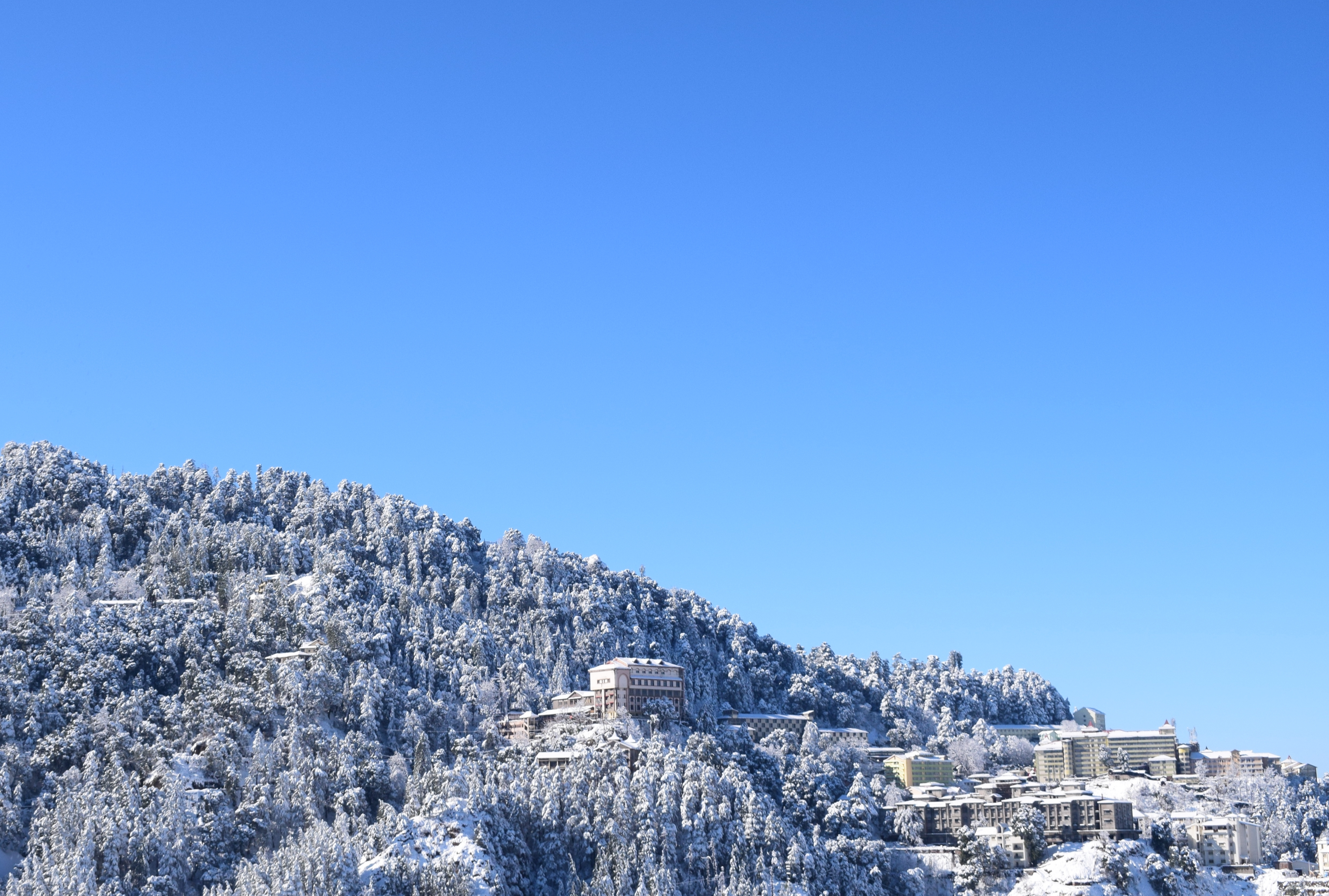
Government College, Sanjauli during winters

Shimla (Note: (/ˈʃɪmlə/; IPA: [ʃɪ̃m.läː])) is the summer capital and largest city of northern Indian state Himachal Pradesh. It is the state's most developed city and its centre of commerce, culture and education. Formerly Simla, the city was built across seven spurs in the southwestern Himalayas during Company rule. It became the summer capital of British India in 1864 and hosted the 1945 Simla Conference during Indian independence negotiations.

Small hamlets were recorded before 1815 when the British army annexed the area. Its cool climate and strategic location attracted the British to establish the city in the Himalayan forests. As summer capital, Simla hosted political meetings including the 1906 Simla Deputation and the 1914 Simla Convention. After independence, Himachal Pradesh was created in 1948 as a result of the integration of 28 princely states. The city remained an important political centre, hosting the 1972 Shimla Agreement. After the reorganisation of Himachal Pradesh, the existing Mahasu district was integrated into Shimla.

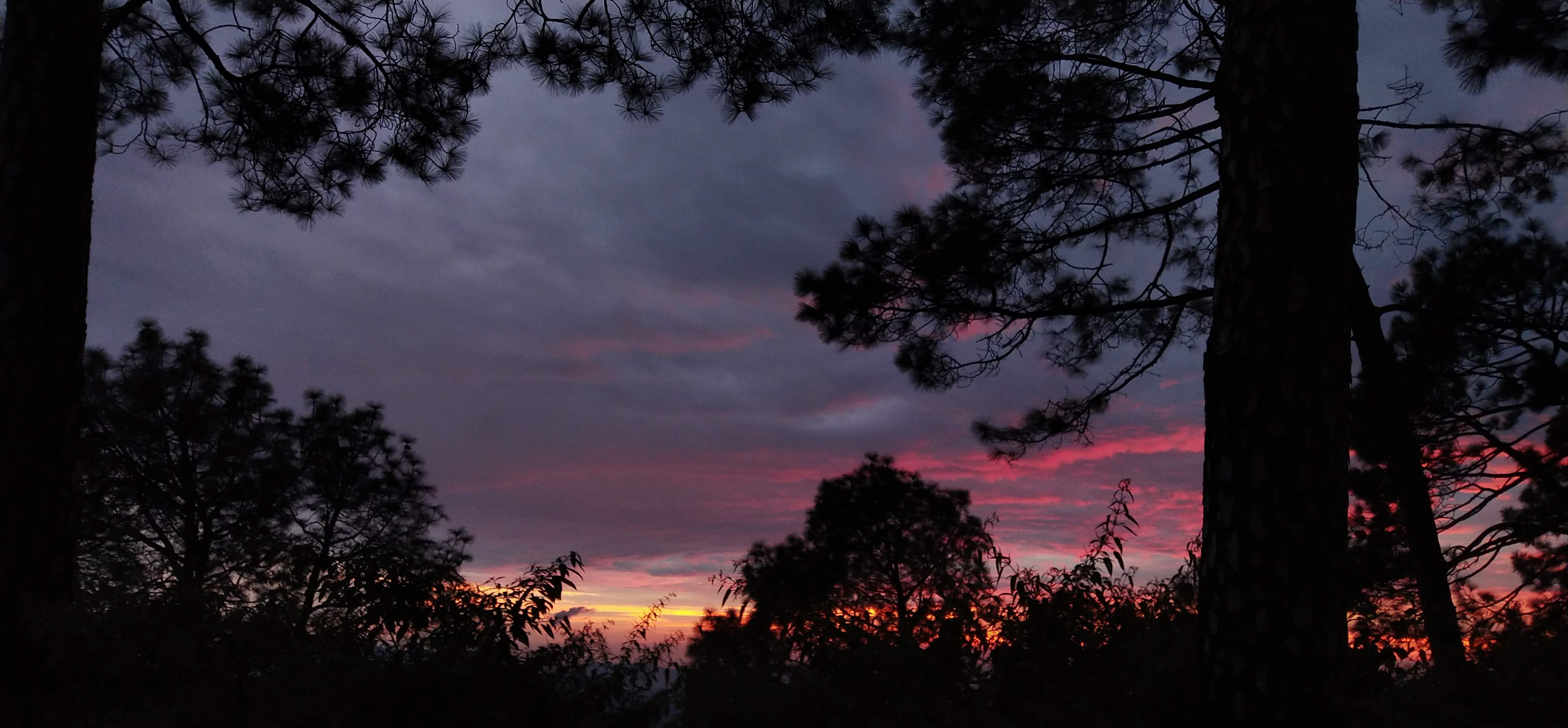
Beautiful sunset in Shimla

Shimla is home to several buildings that are styled in the Tudorbethan and neo-Gothic architectures dating from the colonial era, as well as multiple temples and churches. The colonial architecture and churches, the temples, and the natural environment of the city attract tourists. Major city centre's attractions include the Shri Hanuman Jakhu (Statue), Jakhu Temple, Viceregal Lodge, Christ Church, Mall Road, The Ridge and Annadale. The city centre's northernmost point is Jakhoo and the southernmost location is Annadale, the easternmost point is Sanjauli and the western point is Chotta Shimla. The Kalka–Shimla Railway line built by the British, a UNESCO World Heritage Site, is also a major tourist attraction. Owing to its steep terrain, Shimla hosts the mountain biking race MTB Himalaya, which started in 2005 and is regarded as the biggest event of its kind in South Asia. Shimla also has the largest natural ice skating rink in South Asia. Apart from being a tourism centre, the city is also an educational hub with several colleges and research institutions.

== Etymology ==
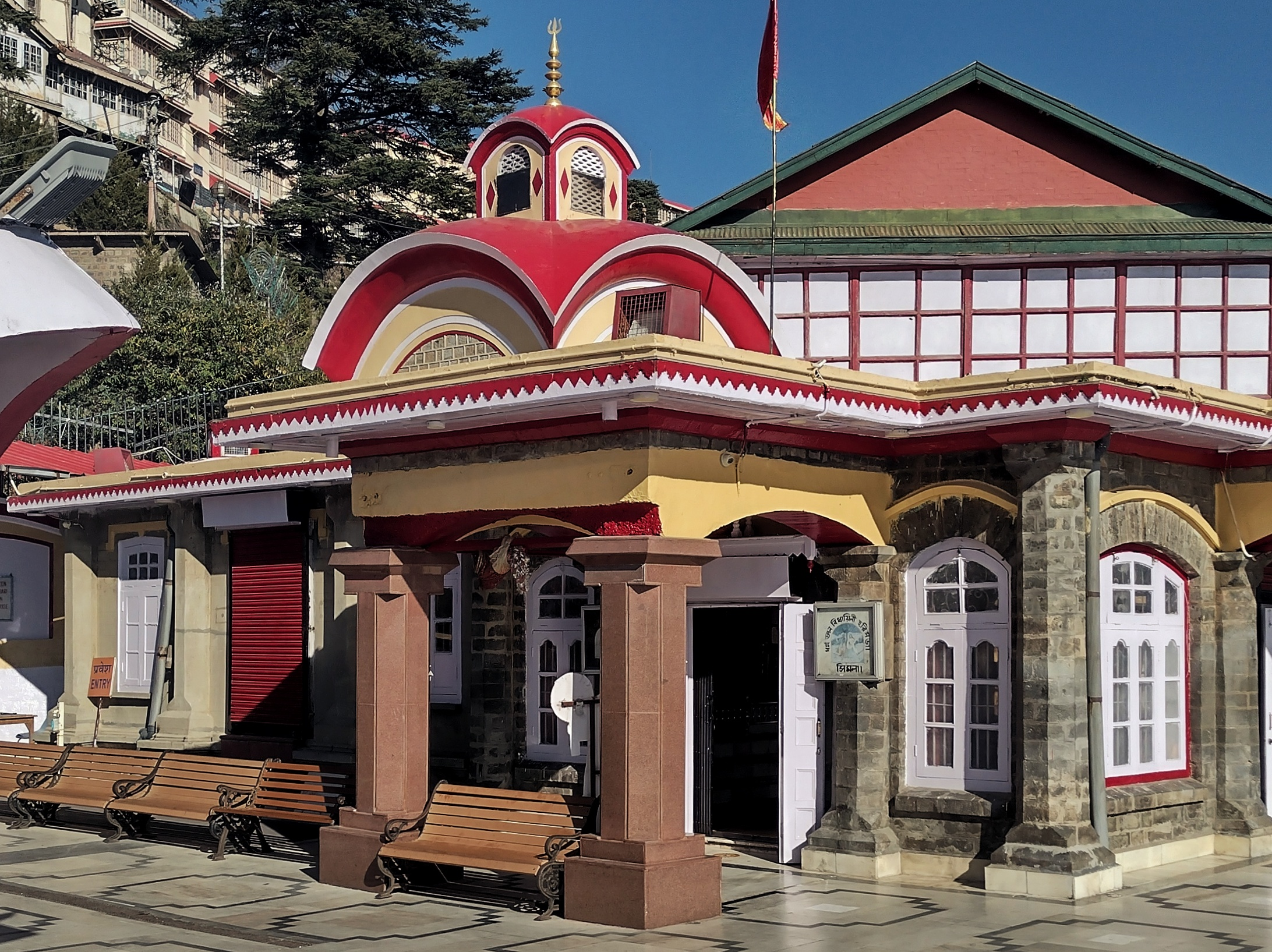
Kali Bari Mandir, after which the city is named

One theory suggests that the name "Shimla" was derived from Shyamalaya, meaning 'blue house', a solitary house made of blue slate on Jakhu Hill, built by a fakir.

According to another version, the city gets its name from Shamli or Shyamala, meaning 'blue lady', referring to the Hindu goddess Kali. It is believed that a temple dedicated to goddess Shamli, an incarnation of Kali, used to be on the Jakhu hillside near the Rothney Castle. Many believe that during the British period, the image of the goddess was shifted to a new place, the now-famous Kali Bari Temple.

In 2018, the state government decided to change the city's name from Shimla to Shyamala. However, seeing the negative response of the general public, the state government dismissed the plan.

== History ==
=== Early modern history ===
Most of the area occupied by present-day Shimla city was dense forest during the 18th century. The only sign of civilisation was the Jakhu Temple and various other temples, a few scattered houses, and nearby villages which have now turned out as posh and major neighbourhoods of the city. The area was called 'Shimla', named after Hindu goddess Shyamala Devi, an incarnation of Kali.

=== Anglo Gorkha Wars ===
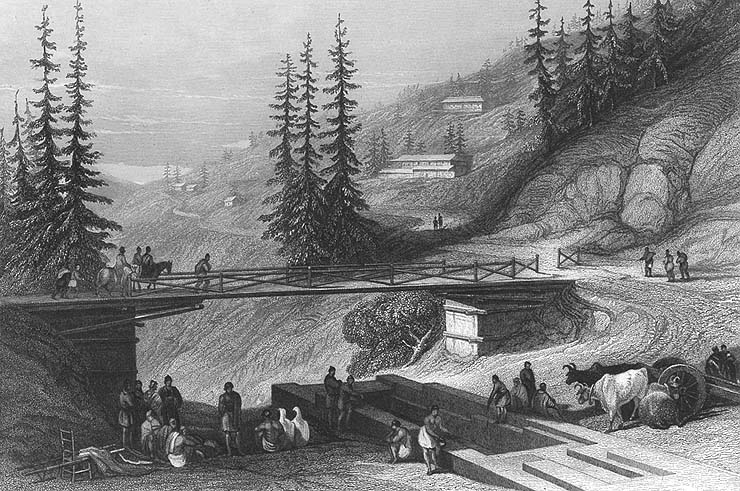
The bridge connecting Shimla with Chhota Shimla, originally erected in 1829 by Lord Combermere, Shimla, the 1850s

The area of present-day Shimla was invaded and captured by Bhimsen Thapa of Nepal in 1806. The British East India Company took control of the territory as per the Sugauli Treaty after the Anglo-Nepalese War (1814–16). The Gurkha leaders were quelled by storming the fort of Malaun under the command of David Ochterlony in May 1815.

=== Early British settlements in Simla ===
In a diary entry dated 30 August 1817, the Gerard brothers, who surveyed the area, describe Shimla as "a middling-sized village where a fakir is situated to give water to the travellers". In 1819, Lieutenant Ross, the Assistant Political Agent in the Hill States, set up a wood cottage in Shimla. Three years later, his successor and the Scottish civil servant Charles Pratt Kennedy built the first pucca house in the area named Kennedy Cottage in 1822, near Annadale, what is now the home for CPWD office. The accounts of the Britain-like climate started attracting several British officers to the area during the hot Indian summers. By 1826, some officers had started spending their entire vacation in Shimla. In 1827, William Amherst, the Governor-General of Bengal, visited Shimla and stayed in the Kennedy House. A year later, Stapleton Cotton, the Commander-in-Chief of the British forces in India, stayed at the same residence. During his stay, a five-kilometre (three-mile) road and a bridge were constructed near Jakhoo. In 1830, the British acquired the surrounding land from the chiefs of Keonthal and Patiala in exchange for the Rawin pargana and a portion of the Bharauli pargana. The settlement grew rapidly after this, from 30 houses in 1830 to 1,141 houses in 1881.

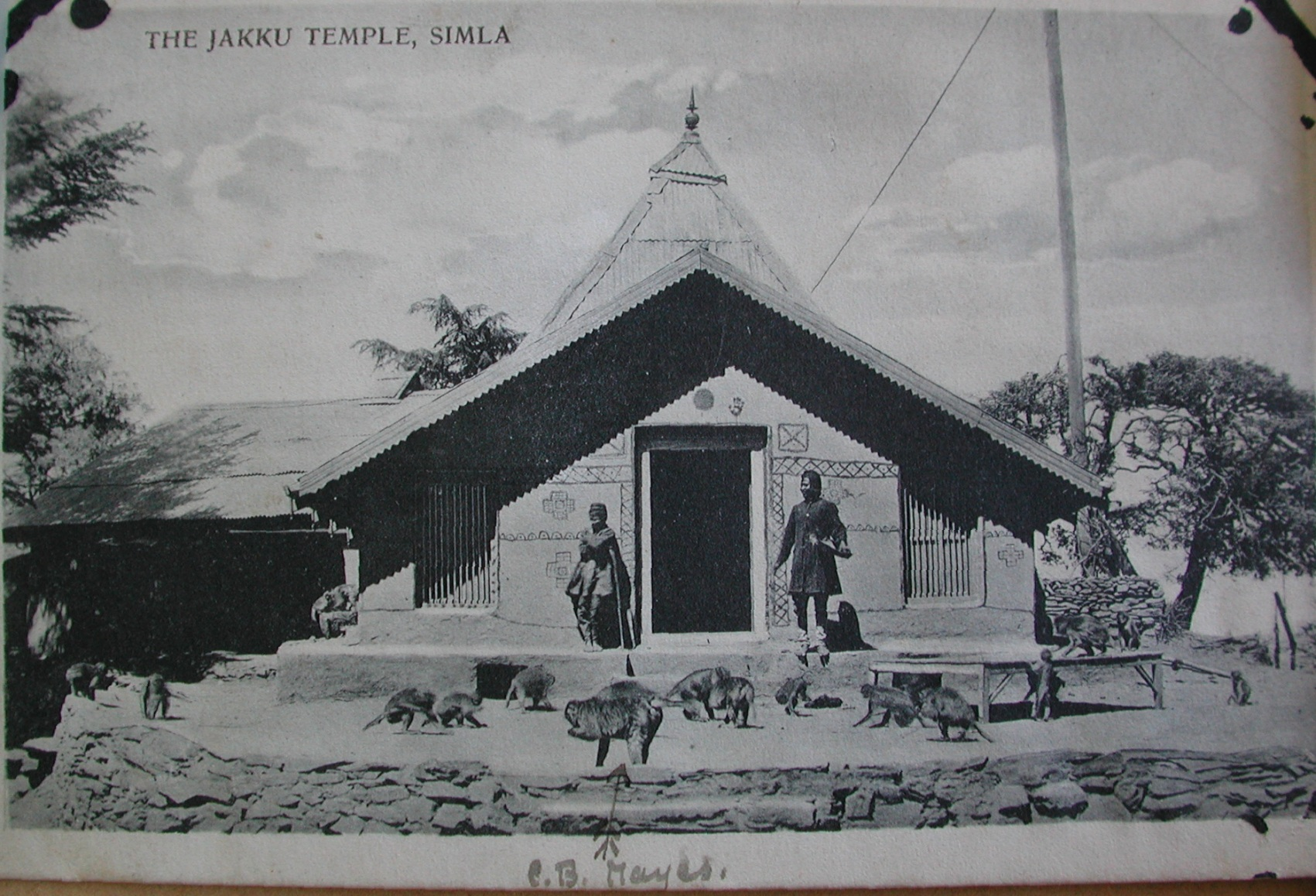
Jakhu Temple in 1910; the temple predates the British settlement in the area

=== Early urban development ===
By the late 1830s, the city also became a centre for theatre and art exhibitions. As the population increased, several bungalows were built and a big bazaar was established in the town. The Indian businessmen, mainly from Sood and Parsi communities, arrived in the area to cater to the needs of the growing European population. On 9 September 1844, the foundation of the Christ Church was laid. Subsequently, several roads were widened and the construction of the Hindustan-Tibet road with a 170-metre (560 ft) tunnel was taken up in 1851–52. This tunnel, now known as the Dhalli Tunnel, was started by Major Briggs in 1850 and completed in the winter of 1851–52. The 1857 uprising caused a panic among the European residents of the town, but Shimla remained largely unaffected by the rebellion.

=== Simla as the 'summer capital' of the British Raj ===
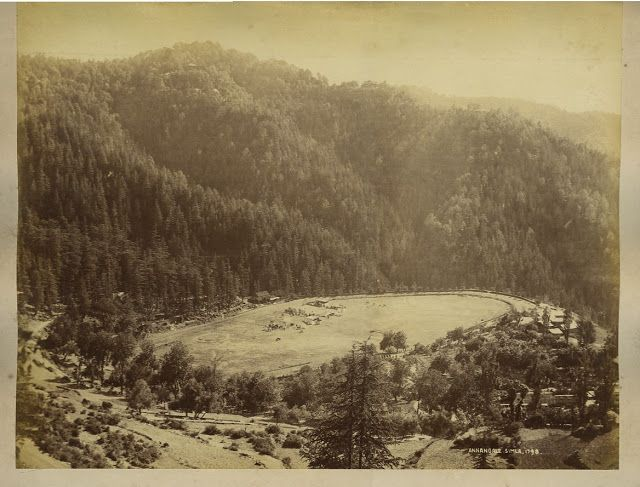
Annadale during British period

In 1863, the Viceroy of India, John Lawrence, decided to shift the summer capital of the British Raj to Shimla. He took the trouble of moving the administration twice a year between Calcutta and this separate centre over 1,600 kilometres (1,000 mi) away, even though it was difficult to reach. Robert Bulwer-Lytton (Viceroy of India 1876–1880) made efforts to plan the town from 1876, when he first stayed in a rented house, but began plans for a Viceregal Lodge, later built on Observatory Hill. A fire cleared much of the area where the native Indian population lived (the "Upper Bazaar" nowadays known as the Ridge), and the planning of the eastern end to become the centre of the European town forced them to live in the Middle and Lower Bazaars on the lower terraces descending the steep slopes from the Ridge. The Upper Bazaar was cleared for a town hall, with many facilities such as a library and theatre, as well as offices for police and military volunteers as well as municipal administration.

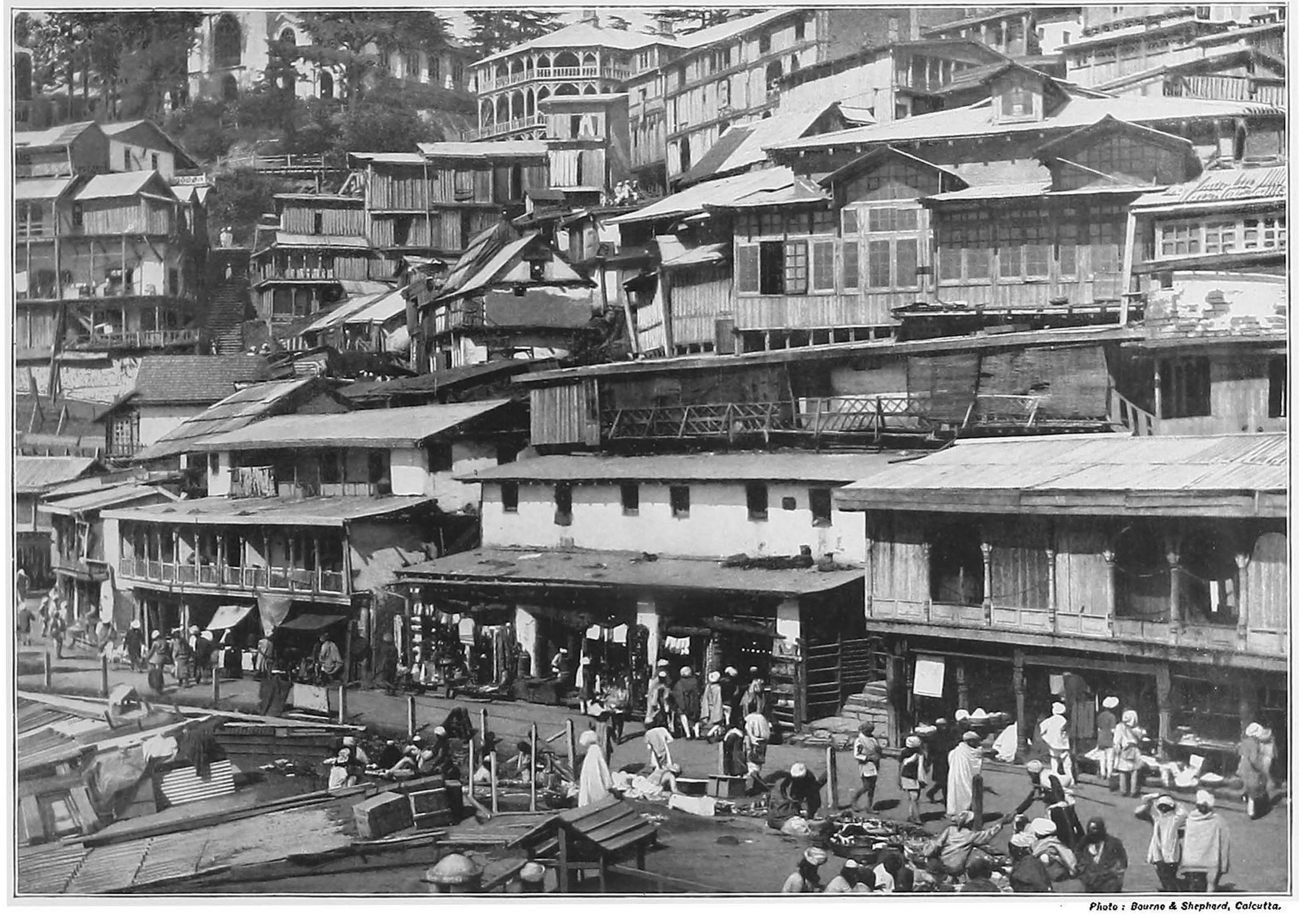
Shimla's "Lower Bazaar" in a photograph taken between 1887 and 1889

During the "Hot Weather", Shimla was also the headquarters of the Commander-in-Chief, India, the head of the Indian Army, and many departments of the Government of India. The summer capital of the regional Government of the Punjab moved from Murree, in modern-day Pakistan, to Shimla in 1876. They were joined by many of the British wives and daughters of the men who remained on the plains. Together these formed the Shimla Society, which, according to Charles Allen, "was as close as British India ever came to having an upper crust." This may have been helped by the fact that it was very expensive, having an ideal climate and thus being desirable, as well as having limited accommodation. British soldiers, merchants, and civil servants moved here each year to escape from the heat during summer in the Indo-Gangetic Plain. The presence of many bachelors and unattached men, as well as the many women passing the hot weather there, gave Shimla a reputation for adultery, and at least gossip about adultery: as Rudyard Kipling said in a letter cited by Allen, it had a reputation for "frivolity, gossip, and intrigue".

The 500-foot (150 m) Lower Bazaar tunnel was built in 1905 and christened Khachhar Surang. The Elysium Tunnel (now known as the Auckland Tunnel), about 120 feet (37 m) in length, was also built in 1905.

The Simla Convention, an ambiguous treaty concerning the status of Tibet negotiated by representatives of the Republic of China, Tibet and Great Britain was signed in Simla in 1913 and 1914. At the convention a demarcation line between Tibet and the North-east region of India was proposed by Sir Henry McMahon. The line came to be known as McMahon Line and is currently the effective boundary between China and India, although its legal status is disputed by the Chinese government. This was also the site of a series of talks held by Viceroy Wavell to discuss a plan for the independence of India with the Indian political leaders of the time. Known as the Simla Conference, the talks failed to bring about a resolution.

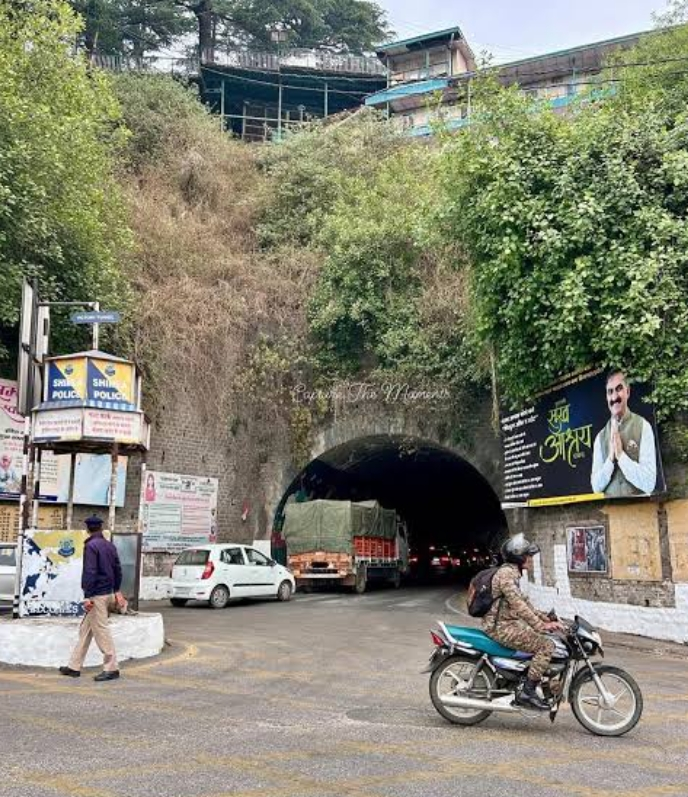
Victory Tunnel Shimla

Shimla was the capital city in exile of British Burma (present-day Myanmar) from 1942 to 1945. In 1945, Victory Tunnel was opened immediately after the Allied victory in World War 2 on 8 May 1945, hence its name. It was the celebratory mark of the end of the War from British side. Since then it has become one of the busiest tunnel routes of Shimla, connecting two major parts of the city.

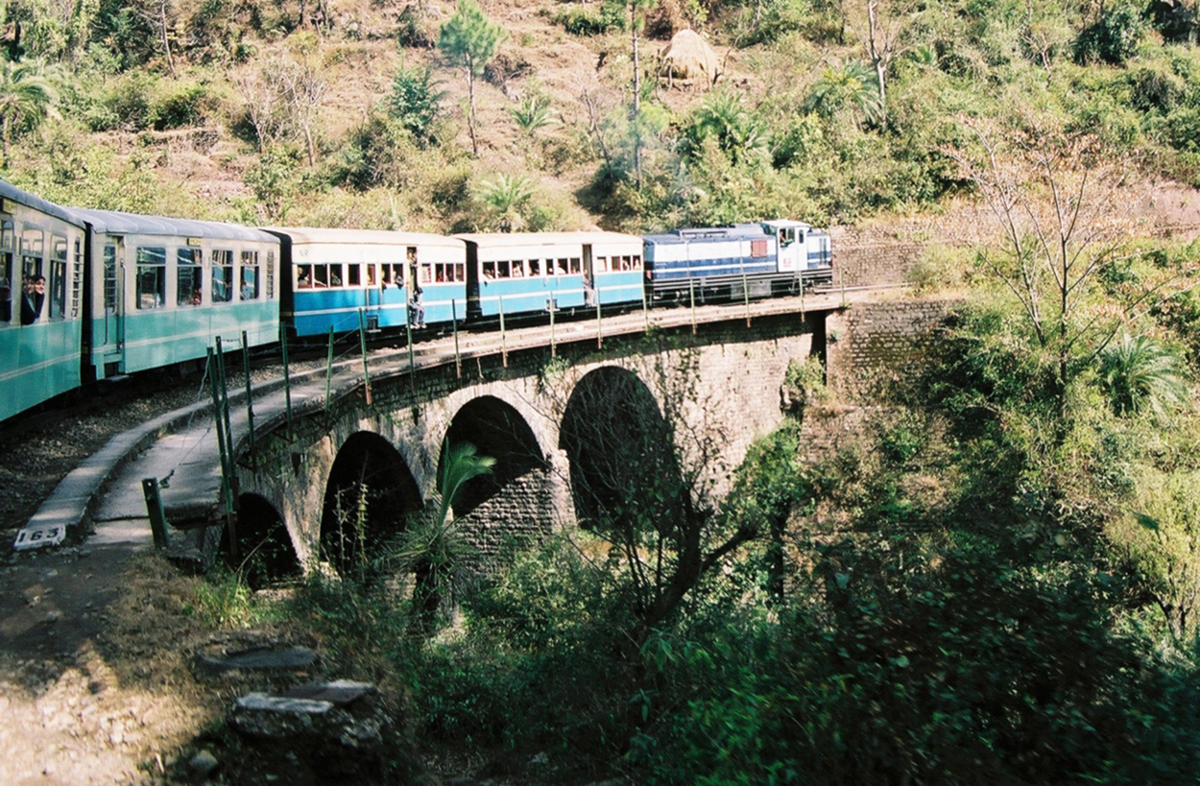
Passenger train on the Kalka-Shimla Railway route

The Kalka–Shimla railway line, opened in 1903, added to Shimla's accessibility and popularity. The railway route from Kalka to Shimla, with more than 806 bridges and 103 tunnels, was touted as an engineering feat and came to be known as the "British Jewel of the Orient". In 2008, it became part of the UNESCO World Heritage Site.

=== Post-Independence Shimla ===
Following the partition of India, Shimla briefly served as the capital of East Punjab, until construction of the new city of Chandigarh (the present-day capital of the Indian states of Punjab and Haryana). Upon the formation of the state of Himachal Pradesh in 1971, Shimla was named its capital.

After independence, the Chief Commissioner's Province of Himachal Pradesh came into being on 15 April 1948 as a result of the integration of 28 petty princely states (including feudatory princes and zaildars) in the promontories of the western Himalaya, known in full as the Shimla Hills States and four Punjab southern hill states by the issue of the Himachal Pradesh (Administration) Order, 1948 under Sections 3 and 4 of the Extra-Provincial Jurisdiction Act, 1947 (later renamed as the Foreign Jurisdiction Act, 1947 vide A.O. of 1950). The State of Bilaspur was merged into the Himachal Pradesh on 1 April 1954 by the Himachal Pradesh and Bilaspur (New State) Act, 1954. Himachal became a part C state on 26 January 1950 with the implementation of the Constitution of India and the Lt. Governor was appointed. The legislative assembly was elected in 1952. Himachal Pradesh became a Union Territory on 1 November 1956. Following areas of Punjab State namely Shimla, Kangra, Kullu and Lahaul and Spiti Districts, Nalagarh Tehsil of Ambala District, Lohara, Amb and Una Kanungo circle, some areas of Santokhgarh Kanungo circle and some other specified area of Una tehsil of Hoshiarpur District besides some parts of Dhar Kalan Tehsil of Pathankot district; were merged with Himachal Pradesh on 1 November 1966 on the enactment of Punjab Reorganisation Act, 1966 by the Parliament. On 18 December 1970, The State of Himachal Pradesh Act was passed by Parliament and the new state came into being on 25 January 1971. Thus Himachal emerged as the eighteenth state of the Indian Union.

The Simla Agreement treaty was signed in Shimla by Zulfiqar Ali Bhutto, the President of Pakistan, and Indira Gandhi, the Prime Minister of India. The agreement paved the way for diplomatic recognition of Bangladesh by Pakistan. Technically the document was signed at 0040 hours on the night of 3 July; despite this official documents are dated 2 July 1972.

Pre-independence structures still dot Shimla; buildings such as the former Viceregal Lodge, Assembly Chamber, Auckland House, Christ Church, Gorton Castle, Shimla Town Hall and the Gaiety Theatre are reminders of British rule in India. The original Peterhoff, another Viceregal residence, burnt down in 1981. British Shimla extended about 2.5 kilometres (1 1/2 mi) along the ridge between Jakhoo Hill and Prospect Hill. The central spine was the Mall Road, which ran along the length of the Ridge, with a Mall Extension southwards, closed to all carriages except those of the viceroy and his wife.

== Geography ==
Shimla is on the south-western ranges of the Himalayas at 31.61°N 77.10°E. It has an average altitude of 2,206 metres (7,238 ft) above mean sea level and extends along a ridge with seven spurs. The city stretches nearly 9.2 kilometres (5 3/4 mi) from east to west. It comes under the historical cultural Mahasu region.

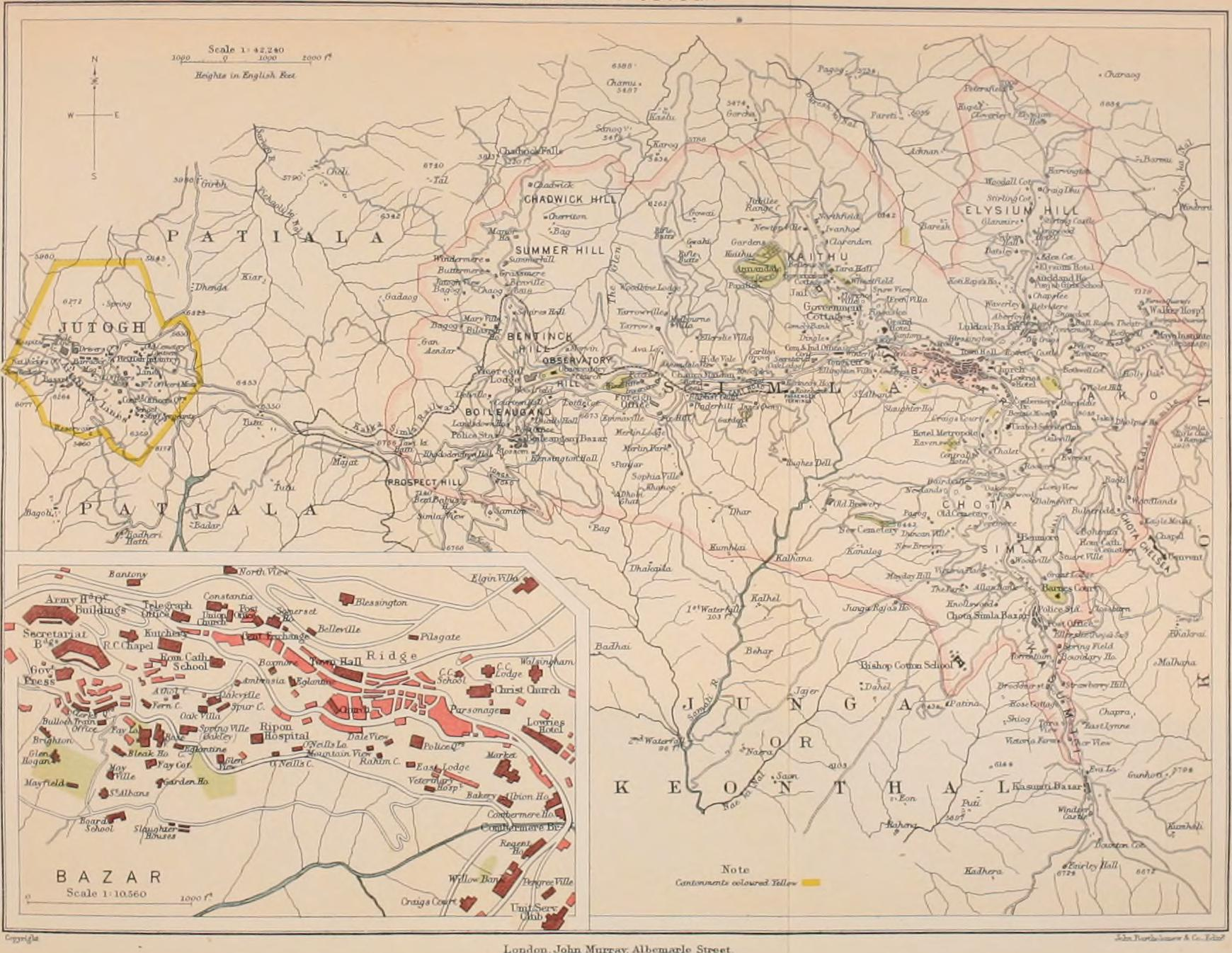
Simla and Jutogh, 1911 map

The city is a Zone IV (High Damage Risk Zone) per the Earthquake hazard zoning of India. Weak construction techniques and an increasing population pose a serious threat to the already earthquake prone region. There are no water bodies near the main city and the closest river, the Sutlej, is about 21 km (13 mi) away. Other rivers that flow through the Shimla district, although further from the city, are the Giri, and Pabbar (both tributaries of Yamuna).

The green belt in the Shimla planning area is spread over 414 hectares (1,020 acres). The main forests in and around the city are of Pine, Deodar, Oak and Rhododendron. Environmental degradation due to the increasing number of tourists every year without the infrastructure to support them has resulted in Shimla losing its popular appeal as an ecotourism spot. Another rising concern in the region are the frequent number of landslides that often take place after heavy rains.

The city is situated 88 kilometres (55 mi) northeast of Kalka, 116 km (72 mi) northeast of Chandigarh, 247 km (153 mi) south of Manali and 350 km (220 mi) northeast of Delhi, the national capital. Kalka can be reached within 2 1/2 hours, and Chandigarh can be reached in 3 hours 15 minutes. Delhi and Manali are both around 7 hours away from Shimla. To the east of Shimla stand the Choor Mountains (Chuor, 3647 m). A passage over these mountains, from the Tons River to Shimla is described in Views in India, chiefly among the Himalaya Mountains, by George Francis White with accompanying drawings, Village of Khandoo, on the Ascent to the Choor, and two that were subsequently the subject of poetical illustrations by Letitia Elizabeth Landon, namely Crossing the Choor Mountains, and Village of Koghera and Deodar Forest, near the Choor.

The accompanying notes record that "During a considerable part of the year, the Choor is hoary with snow; and when moonlight falls upon the scene, an effect is produced as if floods of molten silver were poured over the surface. Moonlight in these regions assumes a novel charm."

Shimla city is geographically uniquely positioned in such a way, that if water is poured on the northern slope at the Ridge ground, it goes to the Arabian Sea via the Sutej River, and if water is poured on the southern slope, it meets the Bay of Bengal through the Yamuna River.

=== Seven Hills of Shimla ===
Shimla was built on top of seven hills: Inverarm Hill, Observatory Hill, Prospect Hill, Summer Hill, Bantony Hill, Elysium Hill and Jakhu Hill. The highest point in Shimla is the Jakhu hill, which is at a height of 2,454 metres (8,051 ft). In recent times the city has spread past the initial seven hills.

== Climate ==
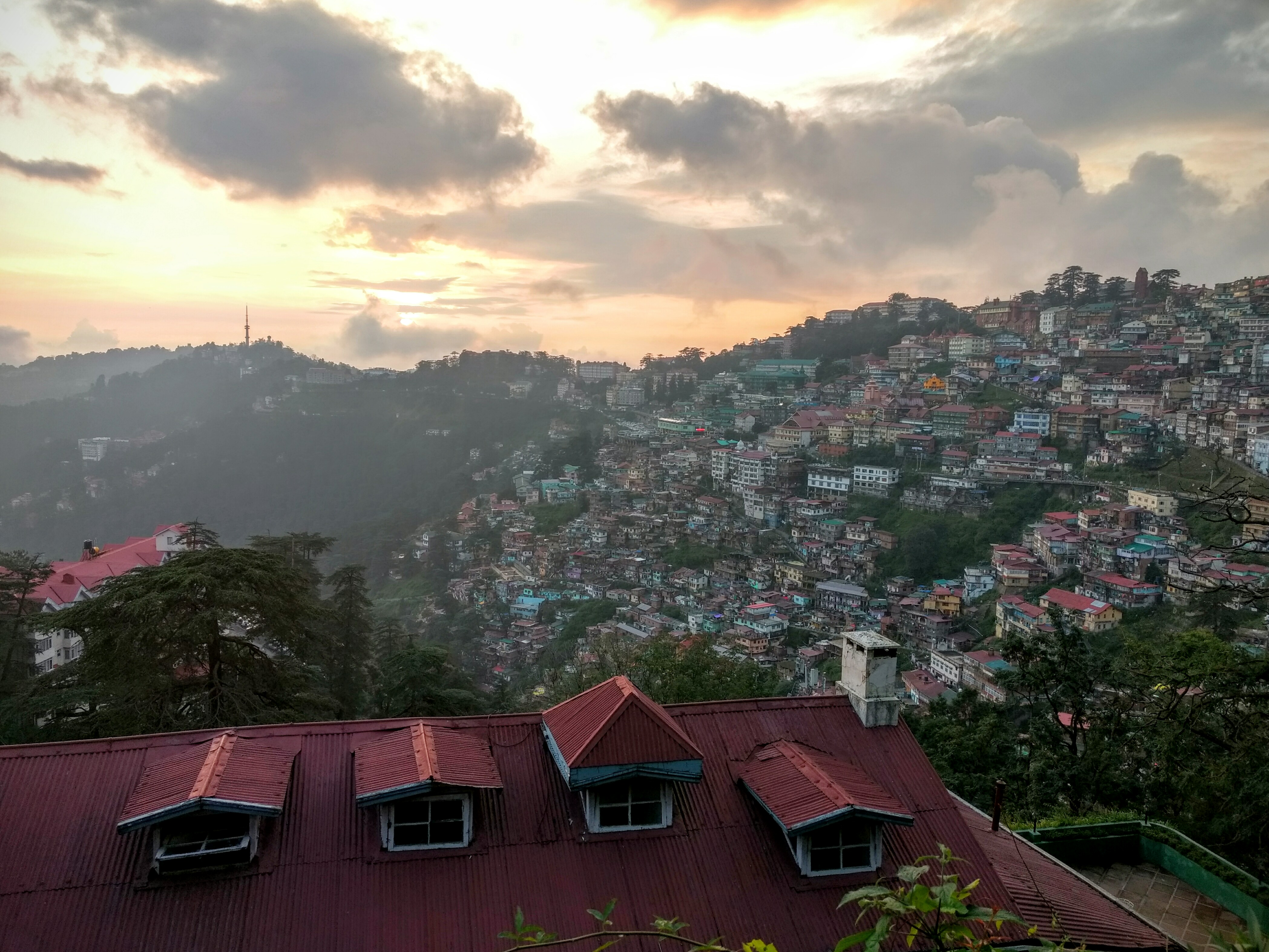
Dusk at Shimla

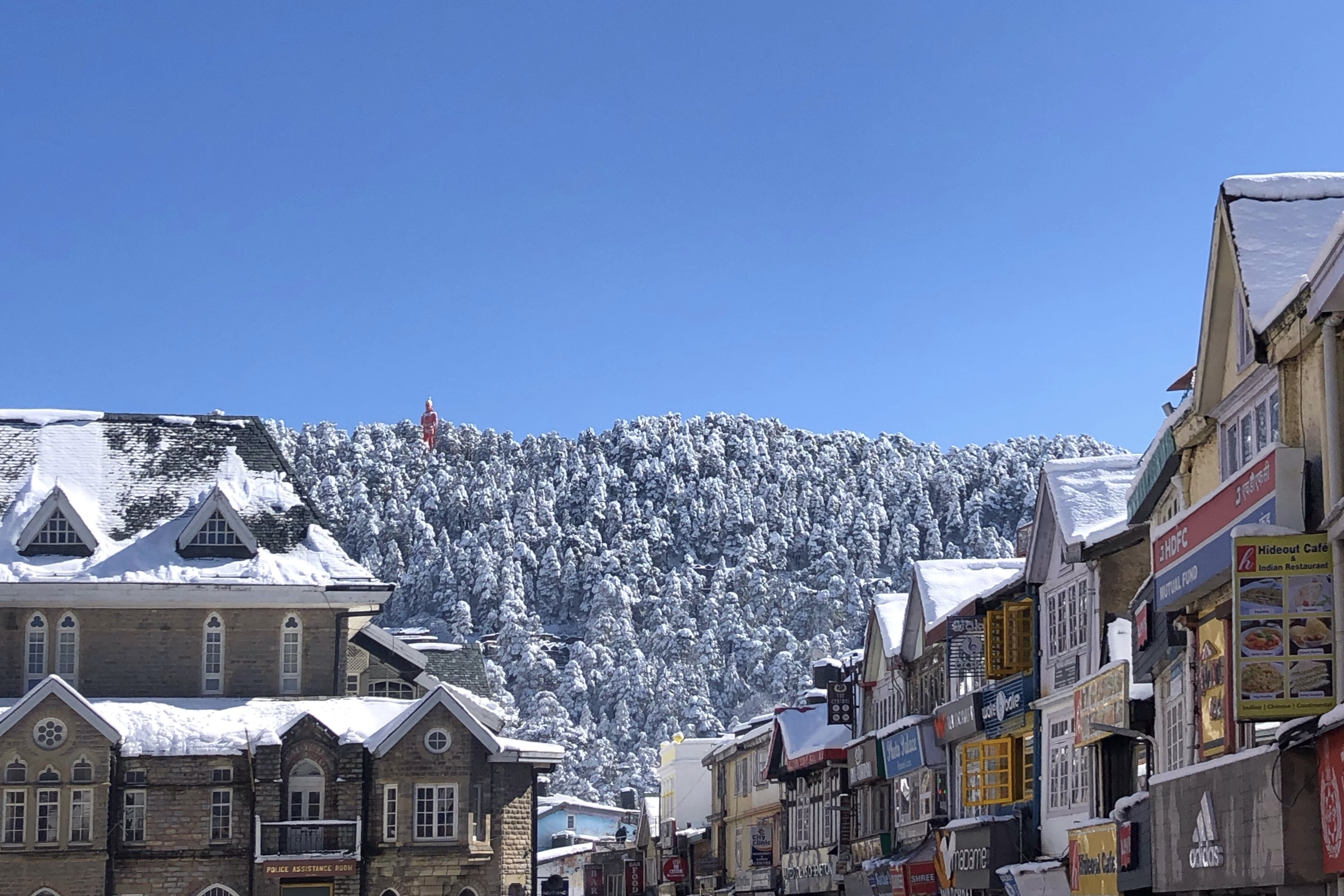
Shimla's Mall road after fresh snowfall in winter

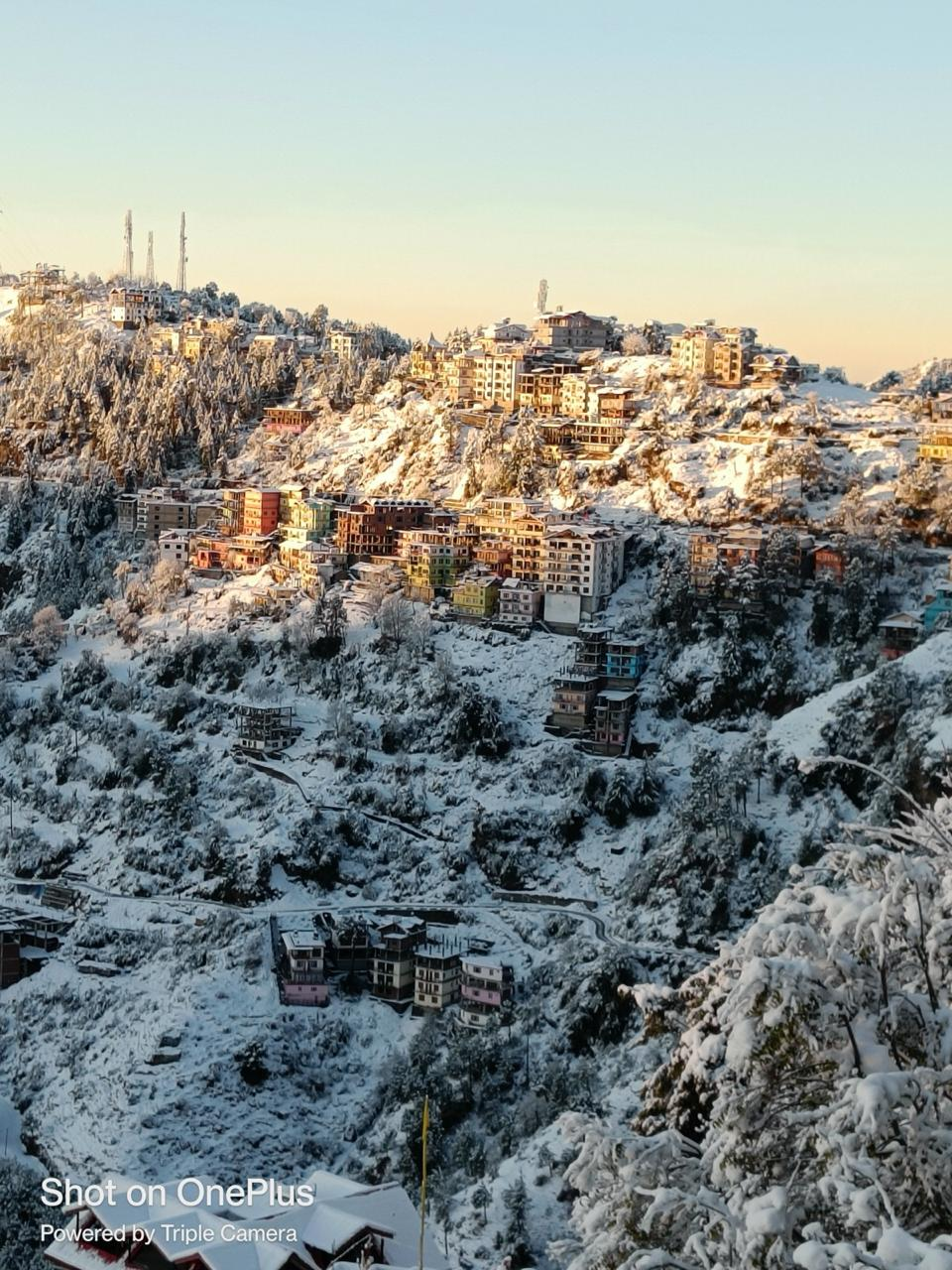

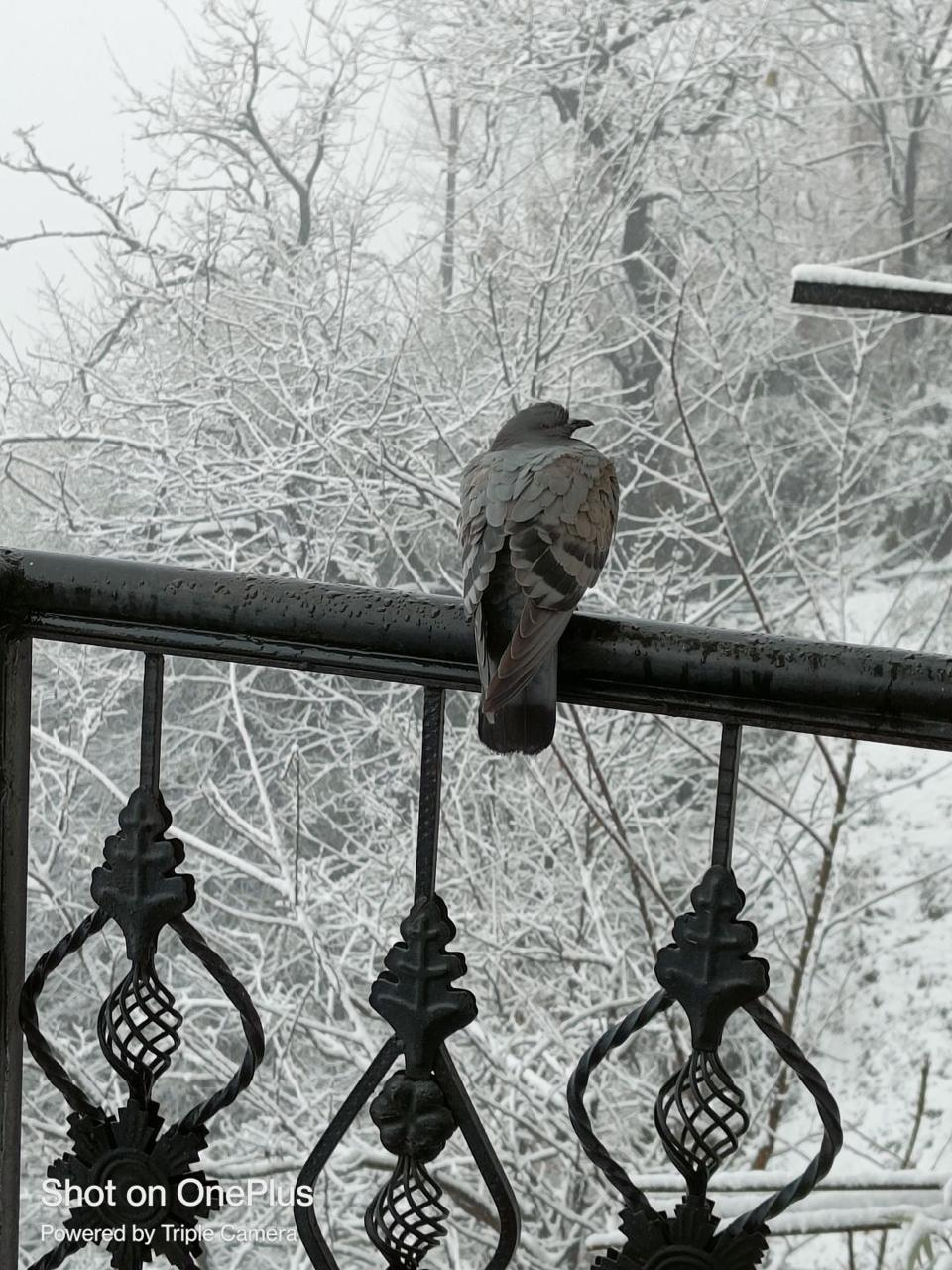
The Shimla Snow

Shimla features a subtropical highland climate (Cwb) under the Köppen climate classification. The climate in Shimla is predominantly cold during winters and cool during summer.

The average temperature during summer is between 16 and 25 °C (61 and 77 °F), and between 3 and 11 °C (37 and 52 °F) in winter. Monthly precipitation varies between 13.6 millimetres (0.54 in) in November and 350 millimetres (14 in) in August. It is typically around 45 millimetres (1.8 in) per month during winter and spring, and around 190 millimetres (7.5 in) in June as the monsoon approaches.

The average total annual precipitation is 1,487 millimetres (59 in), which is much less than most other hill stations but still much heavier than on the plains. Snowfall in the region, which historically has taken place in December, has lately (over the last fifteen years) been happening in January or early February every year.

The maximum snowfall received in recent times was 38.6 centimetres (15.2 in) on 18 January 2013. On two consecutive days (17 and 18 January 2013), the town received 63.6 centimetres (25.0 in) of snow.

On the weekend of 12–13 August 2023, torrential rains attributed to climate change caused major landslides in Shimla, killing at least 57 people. These were part of the 2023 North India floods.

Highest recorded temperature: 32.4 °C (90.3 °F) on 28 May 2010 (A temperature of 37.7 °C (99.9 °F) was recorded on 22 May 2012 at Shimla airport.)

Lowest recorded temperature: −12.2 °C (10.0 °F) on 13 December 1963.

Climate data for Shimla (1991–2020, extremes 1901–present)
Month	Jan	Feb	Mar	Apr	May	Jun	Jul	Aug	Sep	Oct	Nov	Dec	Year
Record high °C (°F)	23.1 (73.6)	23.2 (73.8)	25.8 (78.4)	29.6 (85.3)	32.4 (90.3)	31.5 (88.7)	28.9 (84.0)	27.8 (82.0)	28.6 (83.5)	25.6 (78.1)	23.6 (74.5)	22.3 (72.1)	32.4 (90.3)
Mean daily maximum °C (°F)	9.3 (48.7)	10.3 (50.5)	14.5 (58.1)	19.8 (67.6)	23.0 (73.4)	23.8 (74.8)	21.3 (70.3)	20.5 (68.9)	20.4 (68.7)	18.9 (66.0)	15.4 (59.7)	11.9 (53.4)	17.5 (63.5)
Mean daily minimum °C (°F)	1.7 (35.1)	2.4 (36.3)	6.1 (43.0)	10.8 (51.4)	13.6 (56.5)	15.1 (59.2)	14.6 (58.3)	14.2 (57.6)	12.9 (55.2)	10.5 (50.9)	7.0 (44.6)	4.0 (39.2)	9.5 (49.1)
Record low °C (°F)	−10.6 (12.9)	−8.5 (16.7)	−6.1 (21.0)	−1.3 (29.7)	1.4 (34.5)	7.8 (46.0)	9.4 (48.9)	10.6 (51.1)	5.0 (41.0)	0.2 (32.4)	−1.2 (29.8)	−12.2 (10.0)	−12.2 (10.0)
Average rainfall mm (inches)	79.6 (3.13)	82.6 (3.25)	78.6 (3.09)	58.3 (2.30)	82.2 (3.24)	191.8 (7.55)	328.3 (12.93)	351.3 (13.83)	164.5 (6.48)	30.3 (1.19)	13.6 (0.54)	26.2 (1.03)	1,487.3 (58.56)
Average snowfall cm (inches)	42 (17)	43 (17)	7 (2.8)	0 (0)	0 (0)	0 (0)	0 (0)	0 (0)	0 (0)	0 (0)	0 (0)	7 (2.8)	99 (39.6)
Average rainy days	4.6	5.7	5.8	4.4	7.0	10.0	16.5	16.3	8.3	2.2	1.0	1.9	83.7
Average snowy days	4.2	4.2	1.4	0.0	0.0	0.0	0.0	0.0	0.0	0.0	0.1	1.3	11.2
Average relative humidity (%) (at 17:30 IST)	65	64	57	48	49	65	86	88	79	62	63	61	66
Average ultraviolet index	3	3	5	6	6	6	6	5	5	4	4	3	5
Source 1: India Meteorological Department (snow 1990–2010)
Source 2: Weather Atlas

== Economy ==
Employment is largely driven by the government and tourism sectors.

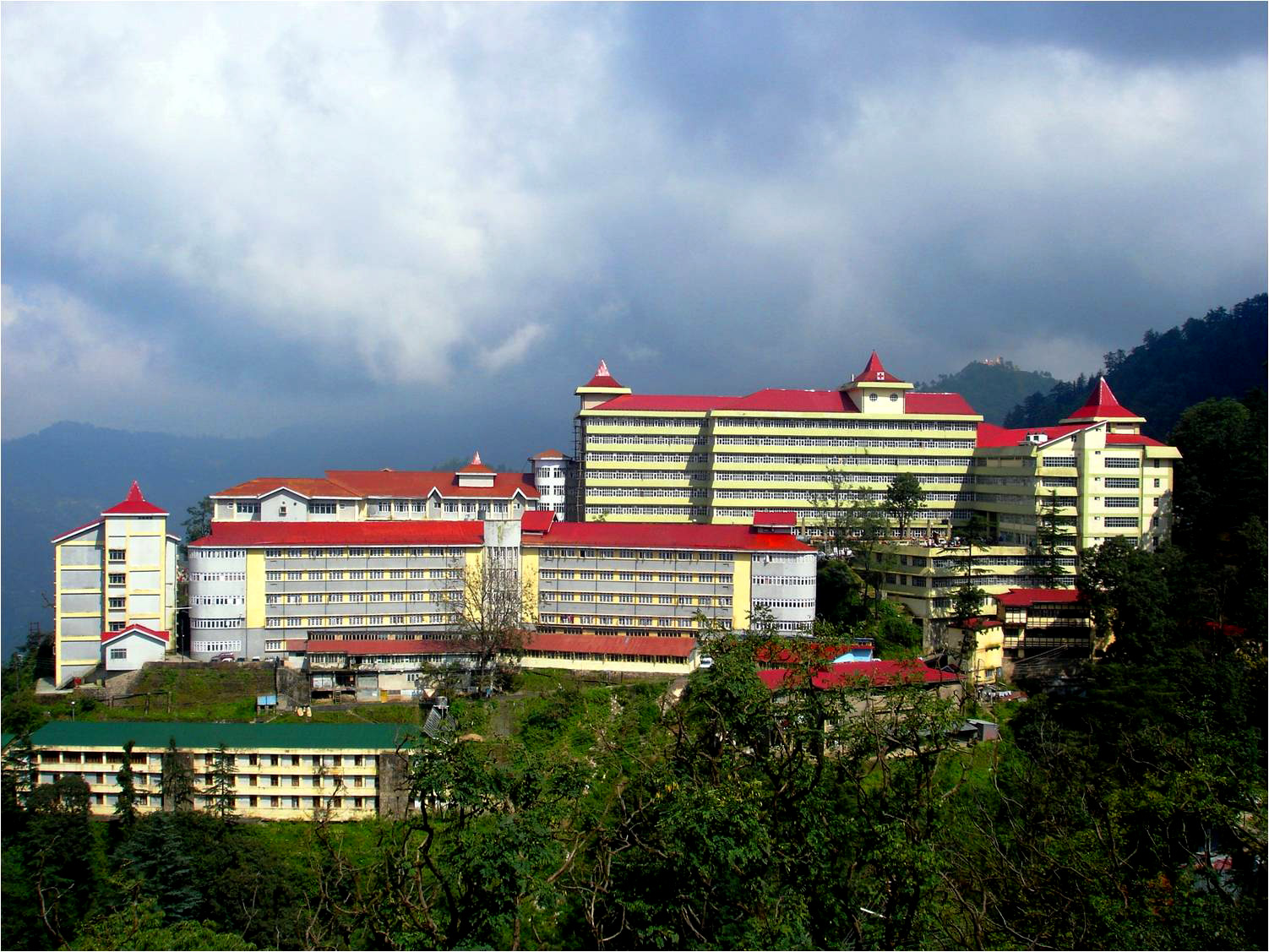
Indira Gandhi Medical College and Hospital, the largest Hospital of the state located in Snowdown, Shimla

In addition to being the local hub of transport and trade, Shimla is the area's healthcare centre, hosting a medical college and four major hospitals: Indira Gandhi Hospital (Snowdown Hospital,) Deen Dayal Upadhyay Hospital (formerly called Ripon Hospital), Kamla Nehru Hospital and Indus Hospital. The city's development plan aims to make Shimla an attractive health tourism spot. Major departmental headquarters of the state are also located in Shimla such as Himachal Pradesh Government Printing and Stationery Press, Himachal Pradesh State Electricity Board, and Himachal Pradesh Police Headquarters.

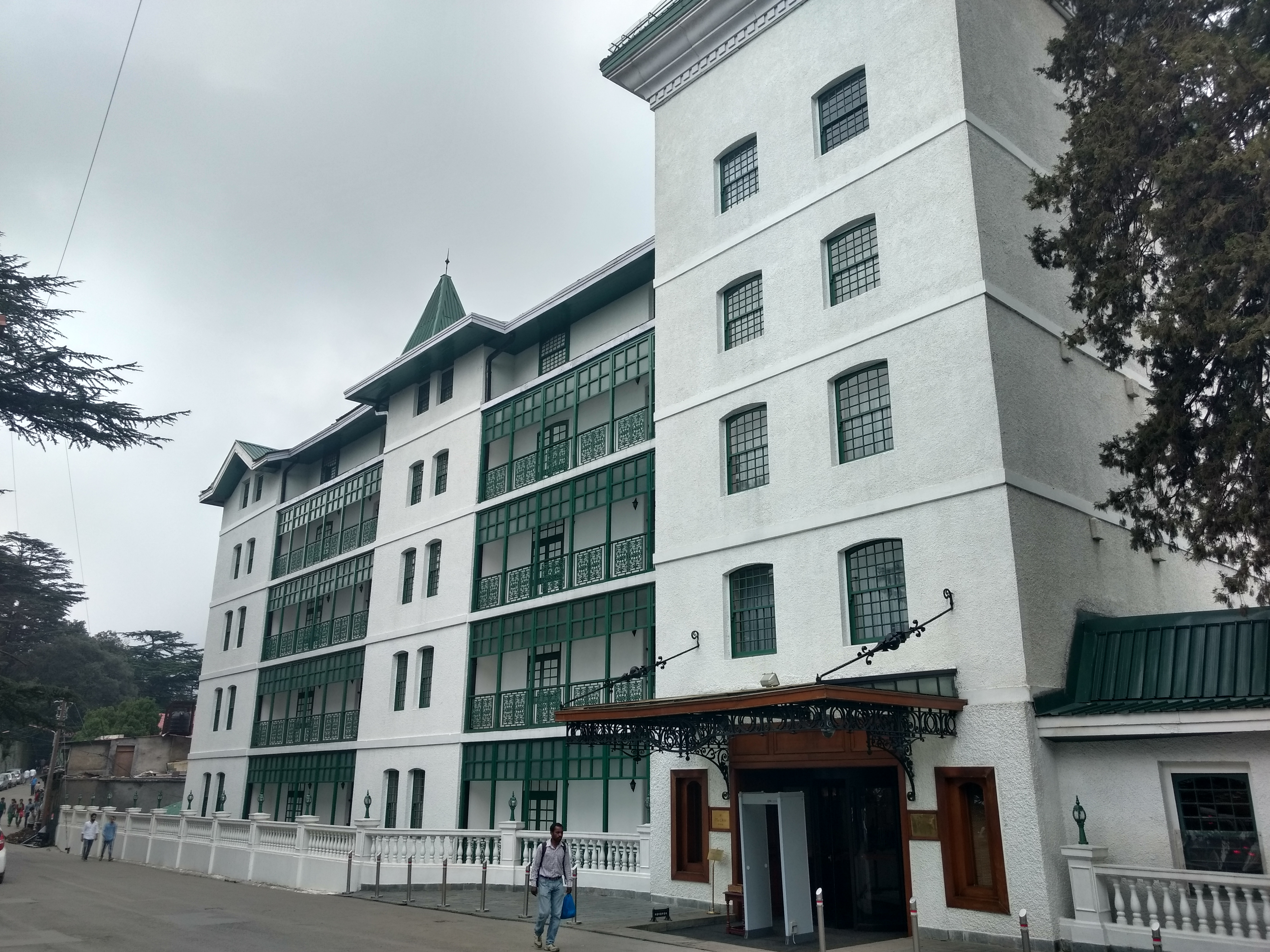
The Oberoi Cecil, a five-star and historic hotel located in Chaura Maidan, Shimla

The hotel industry is one of the major sources of income generation for the city. Shimla has up to 6500 hotels, including 5-star hotels, most popular is Oberoi Cecil, Peterhoff, Wildflower Hall and Hotel Holiday Home. Shimla leads the list of Indian cities with the highest-ranked hotels.

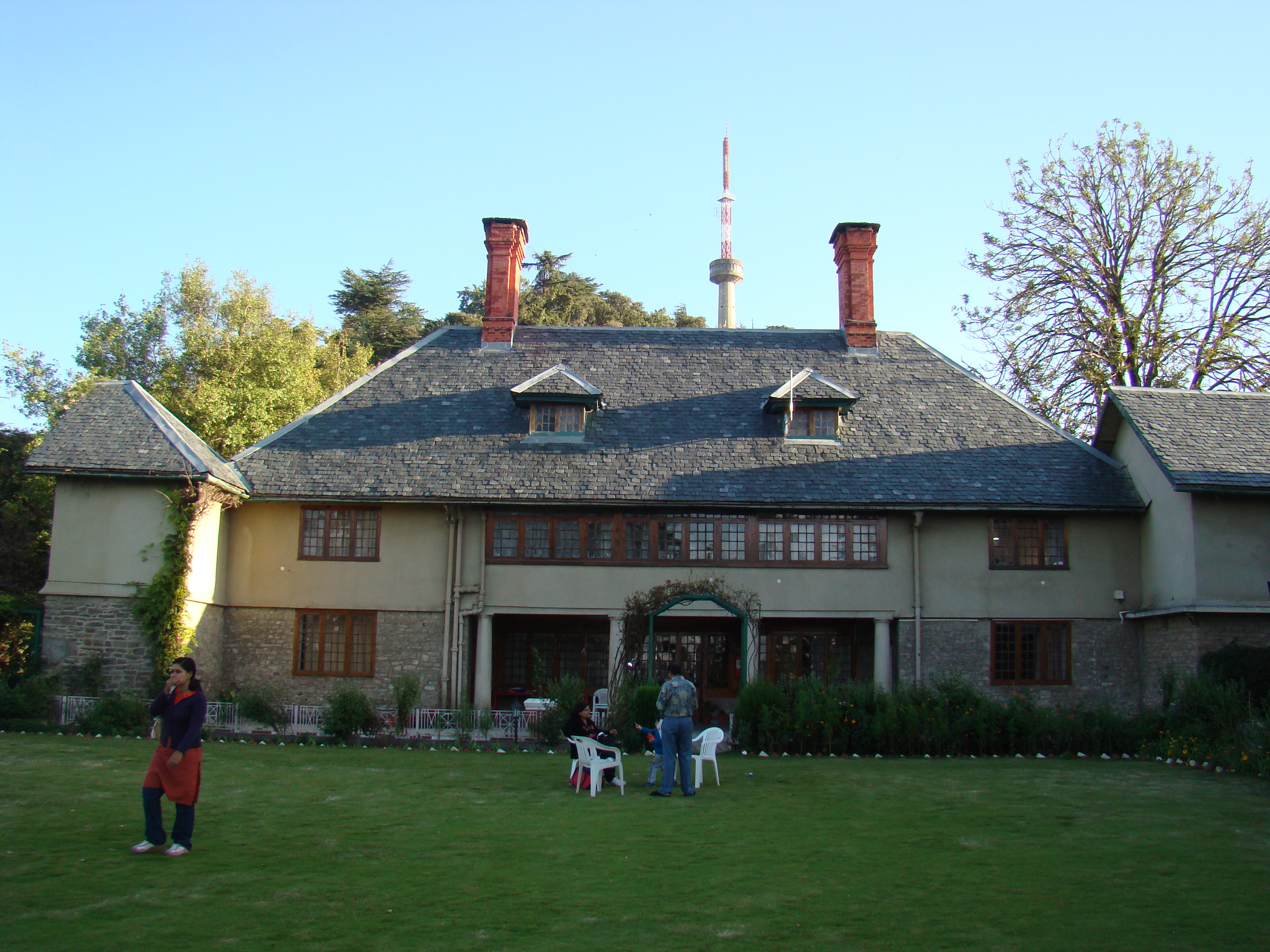
National Academy of Audits and Accounts, Yarrows

Along with schools of higher education, several institutes are also present, namely Himachal Pradesh University and Indian Institute of Advanced Study. Recruitment to the IAAS is through the joint competitive examinations (the Civil Services Examination) and promotion from the subordinate cadre. Once recruited to IAAS, the directly recruited officers are trained mainly at the National Academy of Audit and Accounts. Students from across India prefer to study in Shimla because of its climate and Queen of Hill Stations status. These have added to the economy of the district as well as the state.

The government is trying to promote the technology and IT sector as the new area for growth and promotion although not many companies have yet settled in Shimla. There are many new startups in and around Shimla. There are over six call centres in Shimla.

== Civic administration ==
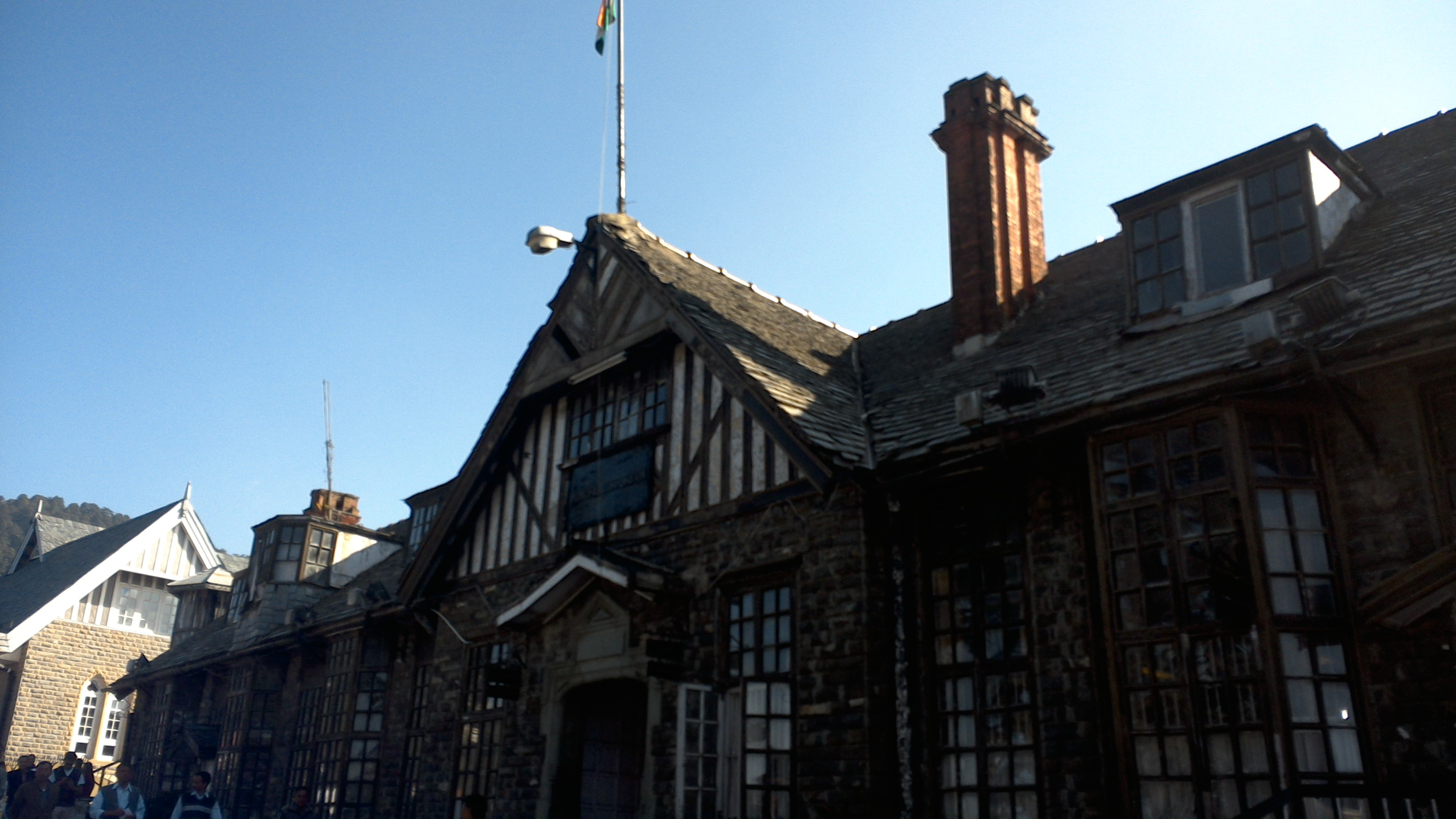
Town Hall as seen from The Ridge

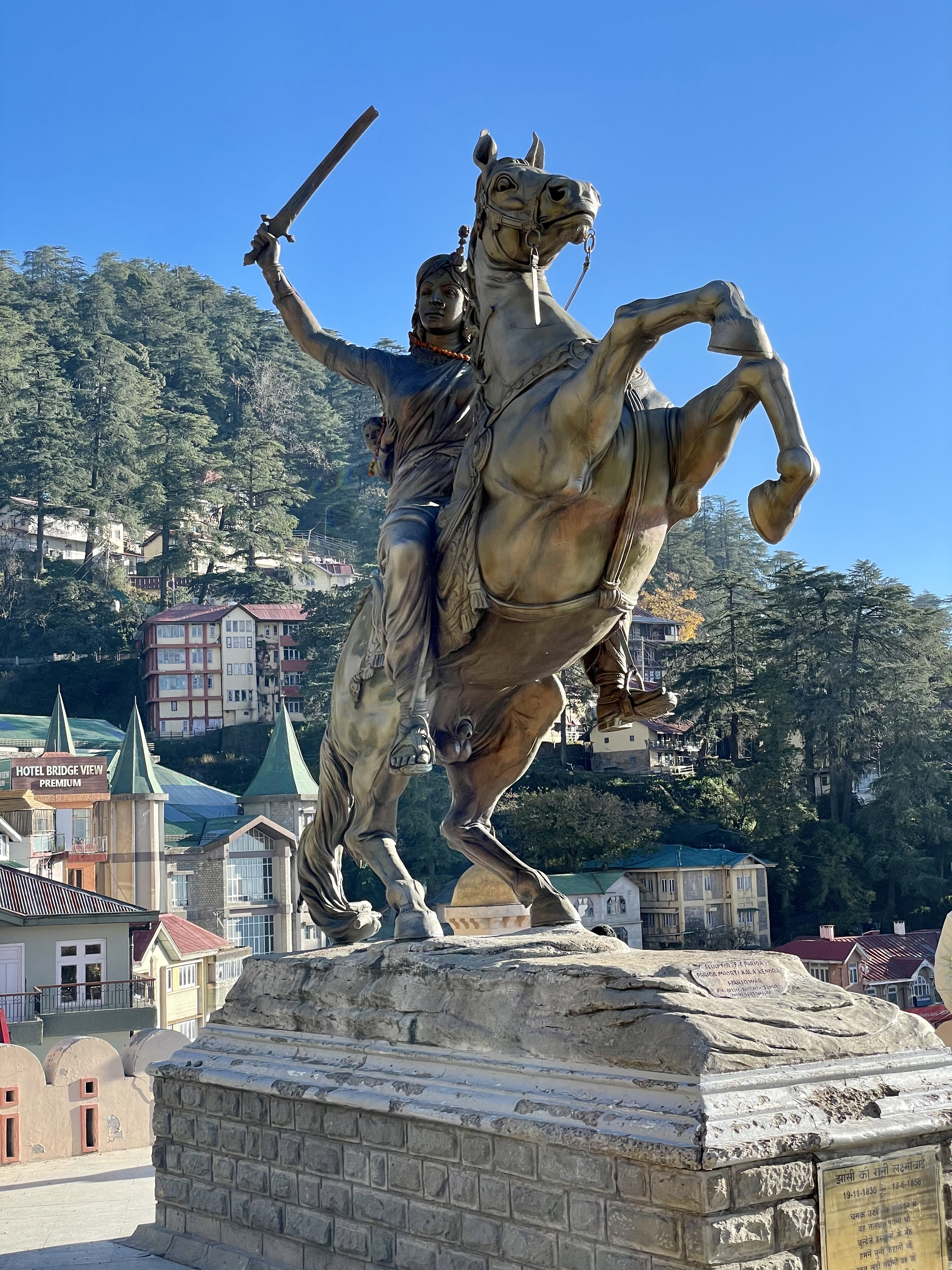
Statue of Rani Laxmi Bai.

The administrative responsibilities of the city of Shimla and merged areas of Dhalli, Totu, and New Shimla reside with the Shimla Municipal Corporation (SMC). All three areas were taken under SMC in 2006–07. Established in 1851, the Shimla Municipal Corporation is an elected body comprising 41 councillors, three of whom are nominated by the government of Himachal Pradesh. The nominations are based on prominence in the fields of social service, academics, and other activities. 33% of the seats are reserved for women. The elections take place every five years and the mayor and deputy mayor are elected by and among the councillors themselves.

The administrative head of the corporation is the Commissioner who is appointed by the state government.

The two major political parties are the Bharatiya Janata Party and Indian National Congress with a third party, Communist Party of India (Marxist), emerging.

The city contributes one seat to the state assembly (Vidhan Sabha) and one seat to the lower house of parliament (Lok Sabha). Law and order in the city is collectively maintained by the Police Force, Vigilance Department, enforcement directorate, forensics, fire brigade, prisons service and Home Guard. There are five police stations and three fire stations in Shimla. The Superintendent of Police, Shimla heads the police force. The First Armed Police Battalion, one of the four armed police battalions in the state, is available for assistance to the local police.

There are 11 courts in the district including a fast-track court.

== Demographics ==
=== Population ===
Historical population
Year	Pop.	±% p.a.
1901	13,960	—
1911	19,405	+3.35%
1921	27,213	+3.44%
1931	18,144	−3.97%
1941	18,348	+0.11%
1951	46,150	+9.66%
1961	42,597	−0.80%
1971	56,032	+2.78%
1981	71,608	+2.48%
1991	104,533	+3.86%
2001	142,555	+3.15%
2011	169,578	+1.75%
2021	220,000	+2.64%
Source: Census of India

According to 2011 census, Shimla city spread over an area of 35.34 km^{2} had a population of 169,578 with 93,152 males and 76,426 females. Shimla urban agglomeration had a population of 171,817 as per provisional data of 2011 census, out of which males were 94,797 and females were 77,020. The effective literacy rate of city was 93.63% and that of urban agglomeration was 94.14%.

The city area has grown considerably over time. It has stretched from Hiranagar to Dhalli from one side & Tara Devi to Malyana in the other. As per the 2001 India Census, the city has a population of 142,161 spread over an area of 19.55 km^{2}. A floating population of 75,000 is attributed to service industries such as tourism. The largest demographic, 55%, is 16–45 years of age. A further 28% of the population is younger than 15 years. The low sex ratio – 930 girls for every 1,000 boys in 2001 – is cause for concern, and much lower than the 974 versus 1,000 for Himachal Pradesh state as a whole.

The unemployment rate in the city has come down from 36% in 1992 to 22.6% in 2006. This drop is attributed to recent industrialisation, the growth of service industries, and education.

=== Religion ===
Religion in Shimla Town (2011)
	Percent
Hinduism	93.5%
Islam	2.29%
Sikhism	1.95%
Buddhism	1.33%
Christianity	0.62%
Jainism	0.10%

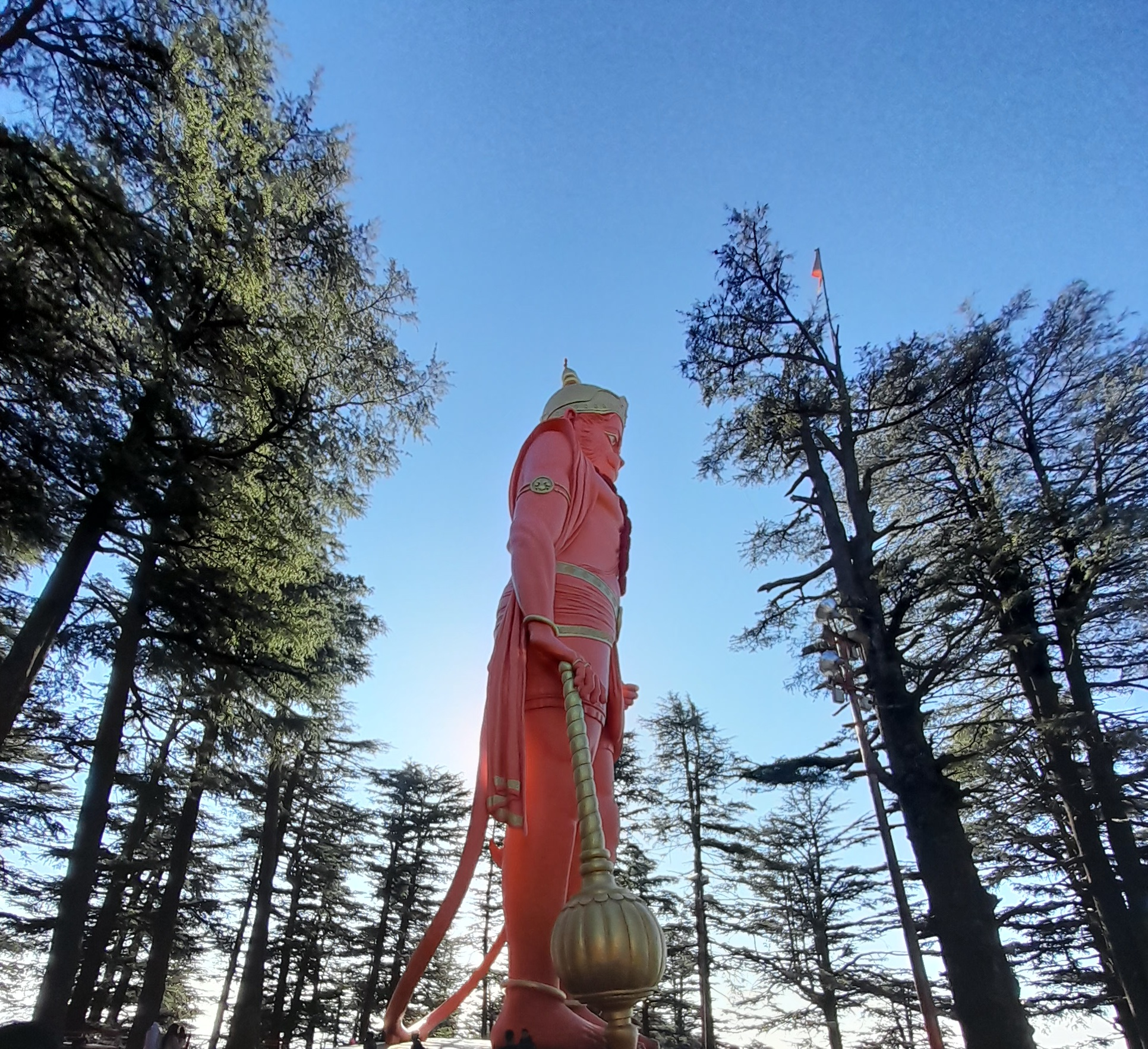
Shri Hanuman Jakhu (statue) in Jakhu Temple

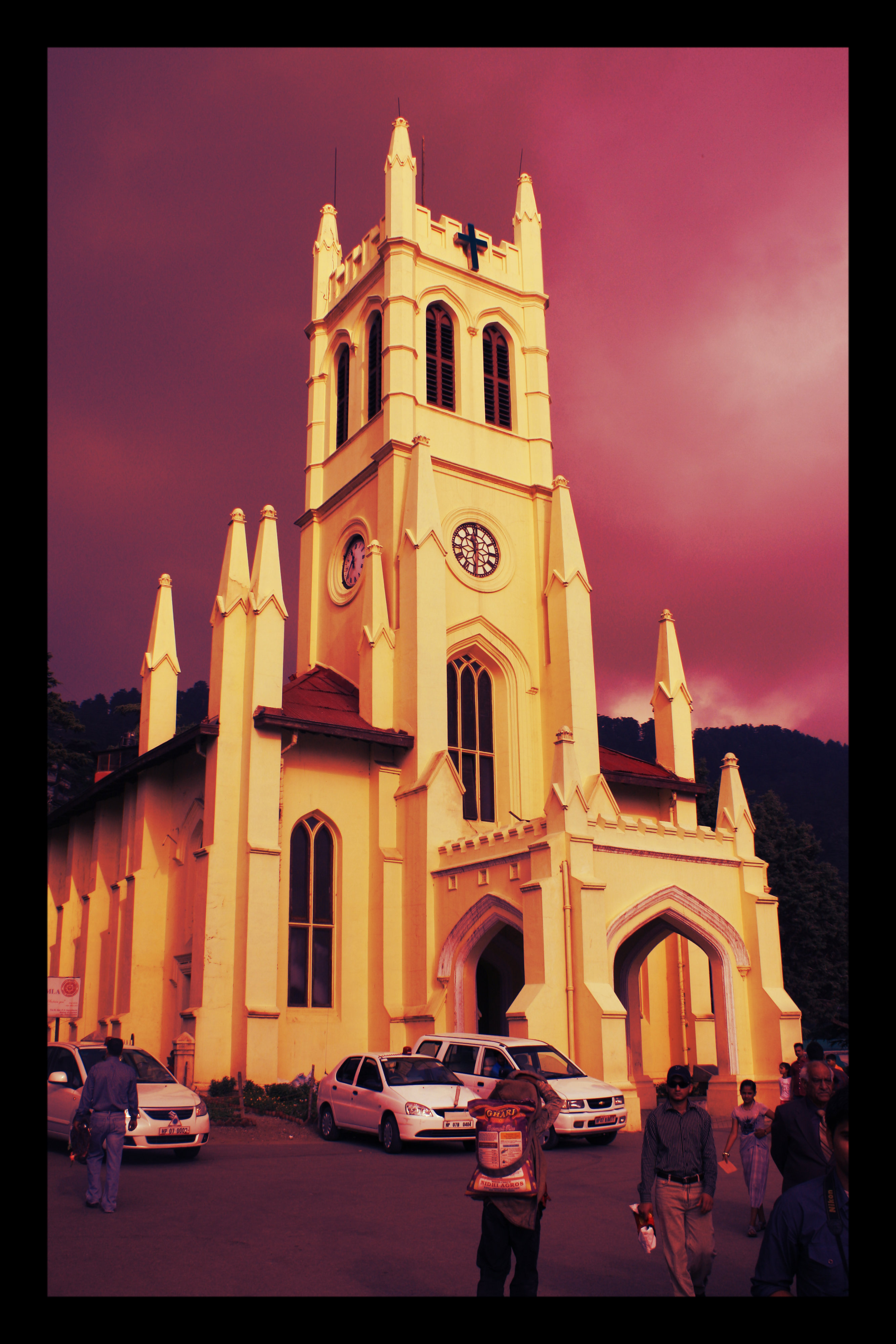
Christ Church located on The Ridge, Shimla

According to 2011 census, the majority religion of the city is Hinduism practised by 93.5% of the population, followed by Islam (2.29%), Sikhism (1.95%), Buddhism (1.33%), Christianity (0.62%), and Jainism (0.10%).

=== Languages ===
Language in Shimla City (2001)
1. Hindi (51.1%)
2. Pahari (21.0%)
3. Punjabi (6.43%)
4. Nepali (1.73%)
5. Tibetan (0.76%)
6. Others (19.0%)

At the time of the 2001 Census of India, 51.1% of the population in the city spoke Hindi, 21.0% Pahari, 6.43% Punjabi, 1.73% Nepali and 0.76% Tibetan as their first language.

== Culture ==
The people of Shimla are informally called Shimlaites. With largely cosmopolitan crowds, a variety of festivals are celebrated here. The annual Shimla Summer Festival is held on the Ridge during peak tourist season. The highlights of this event include performances by popular singers from all over the country. Since 2015, 95.0 BIG FM and Himachal Tourism have been jointly organising a week-long winter carnival on the Ridge from Christmas to New Year's.

Shimla has several places to visit. Local hangouts like the Mall and the Ridge area in the heart of the city. Most of the heritage buildings in the city are preserved in their original 'Tudorbethan' architecture. The former Viceregal Lodge, which now houses the Indian Institute of Advanced Study, and Wildflower Hall, now a luxury hotel, are some of the famous ones. A collection of paintings, jewellery, and textiles of the region can be found at the State Museum (built-in 1974). Charleville Mansion built in late 19th century was a known haunted place in the city.

Lakkar Bazaar, a market extending off the Ridge, sells souvenirs and crafts made of wood. Tatta Pani, 55 kilometres (34.2 mi) from the main city, is the name of hot sulphur springs that are believed to have medicinal value located on the banks of the River Satluj. Shimla is also home to South Asia's only natural ice skating rink. State and national level competitions are often held at this venue. Shimla Ice Skating Club, which manages the rink, hosts a carnival every year in January, which includes a fancy dress competition and figures skating events. Due to the effects of global warming and increasing urban development in and around Shimla, the number of sessions on the ice every winter has been decreasing in the past few years.

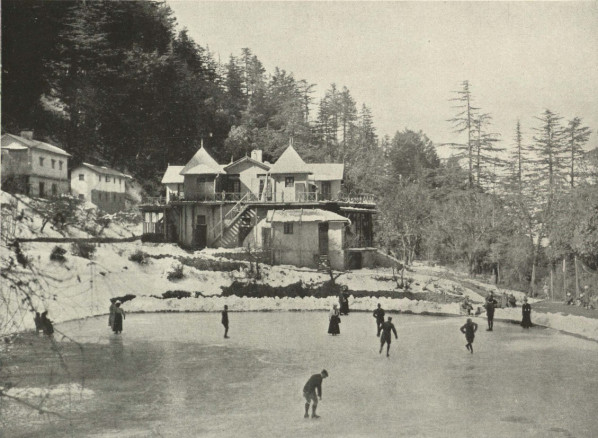
Skating at Simla, c. 1905

Shimla has many temples and is often visited by devotees from nearby towns and cities. The Kali Bari temple, dedicated to the Hindu goddess Kali is near the mall. Jakhoo Temple, for the Hindu god Hanuman, is located at the highest point in Shimla. Sankat Mochan, another Hanuman temple, is famous for the numerous monkeys that are always found in its vicinity. It is located on Shimla-Kalka Highway about 10 kilometres (6.2 mi) from the city. Dhingu Mata Temple is another popular temple of the city situated above Sajauli atop of Dhingu Dhar. Another popular temple in the city is Kamna Devi Temple, situated atop of Prospect Hill, one of the seven hills of Shimla. The nearby temple of Tara Devi is a place for performing rituals and festivals. Other prominent places of worship include a Gurudwara near old bus terminus and Christ Church on the Ridge.

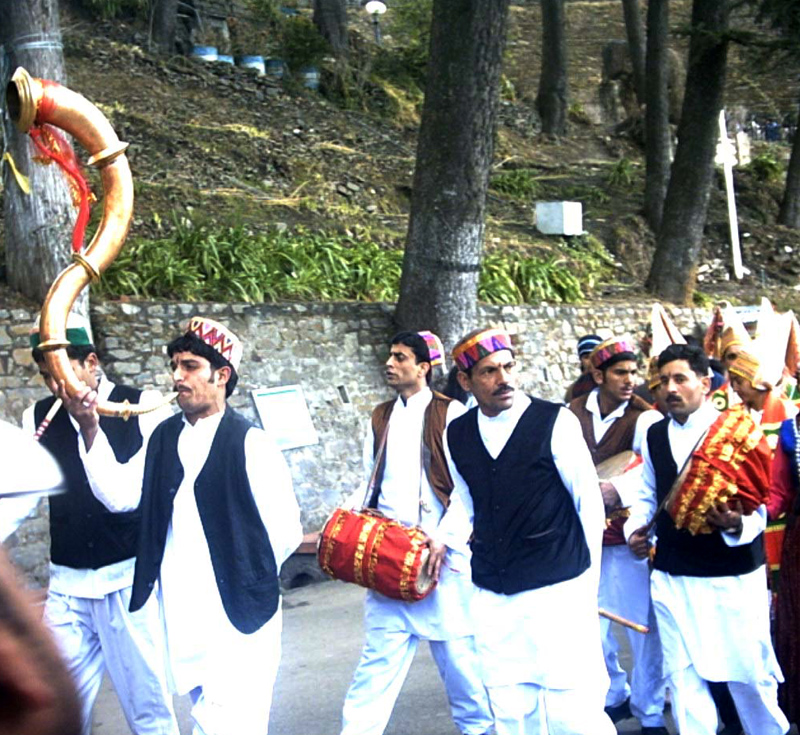
A folk celebration in Shimla

Shimla arts and crafts are highly in demand by tourists. They range from excellent pieces of jewellery, embroidered shawls and garments to leather made articles and sculptures. Shimla is full of pine and deodar trees. The wood has been extensively used in all major buildings of Shimla. The various kinds of crafts of Shimla made out of wood include small boxes, utensils, image carvings, and souvenirs.

The carpet-making of Shimla is a great attraction for tourists. Different floral and other motifs are used. Wool is used to making blankets and rugs. The embroidery includes handkerchiefs, hand fans, gloves, and caps.

The shawls of Shimla are very well known for their fine quality. The leathercraft of Shimla comprises shoes, slippers, and belts. The other arts and crafts of Shimla include a huge collection of beaded and metal jewellery.

The culture of Shimla throwbacks religious, agnostic Mahasui people with a simple lifestyle living away from the hustle and bustle of metro cities.

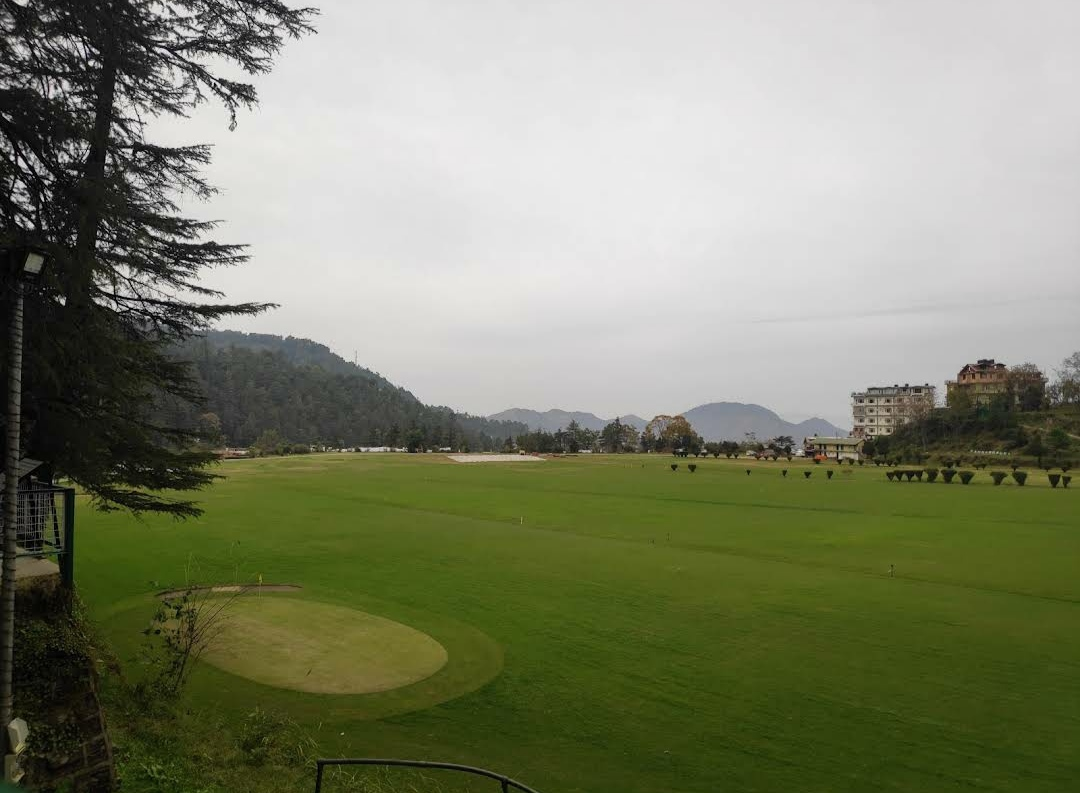
Annadale Ground, located in Annadale serves as major helipad as well as the golf course of the city

Shimla has the largest natural ice skating rink in South Asia. The ice skating season usually begins at the start of December and goes on until the end of February. The city has sporting venues like the Indira Gandhi Rajya Khel Parisar, the main sports complex, a golf course at Annadale and further out from the city is another nine-hole golf course at Naldehra, the oldest of its kind in India. Kufri is a ski resort (winter only) located 19 kilometres (11.8 mi) from the main city. Shimla is also part of the wider Western Pahari cultural belt which extends until Murree, Pakistan.

== Education ==
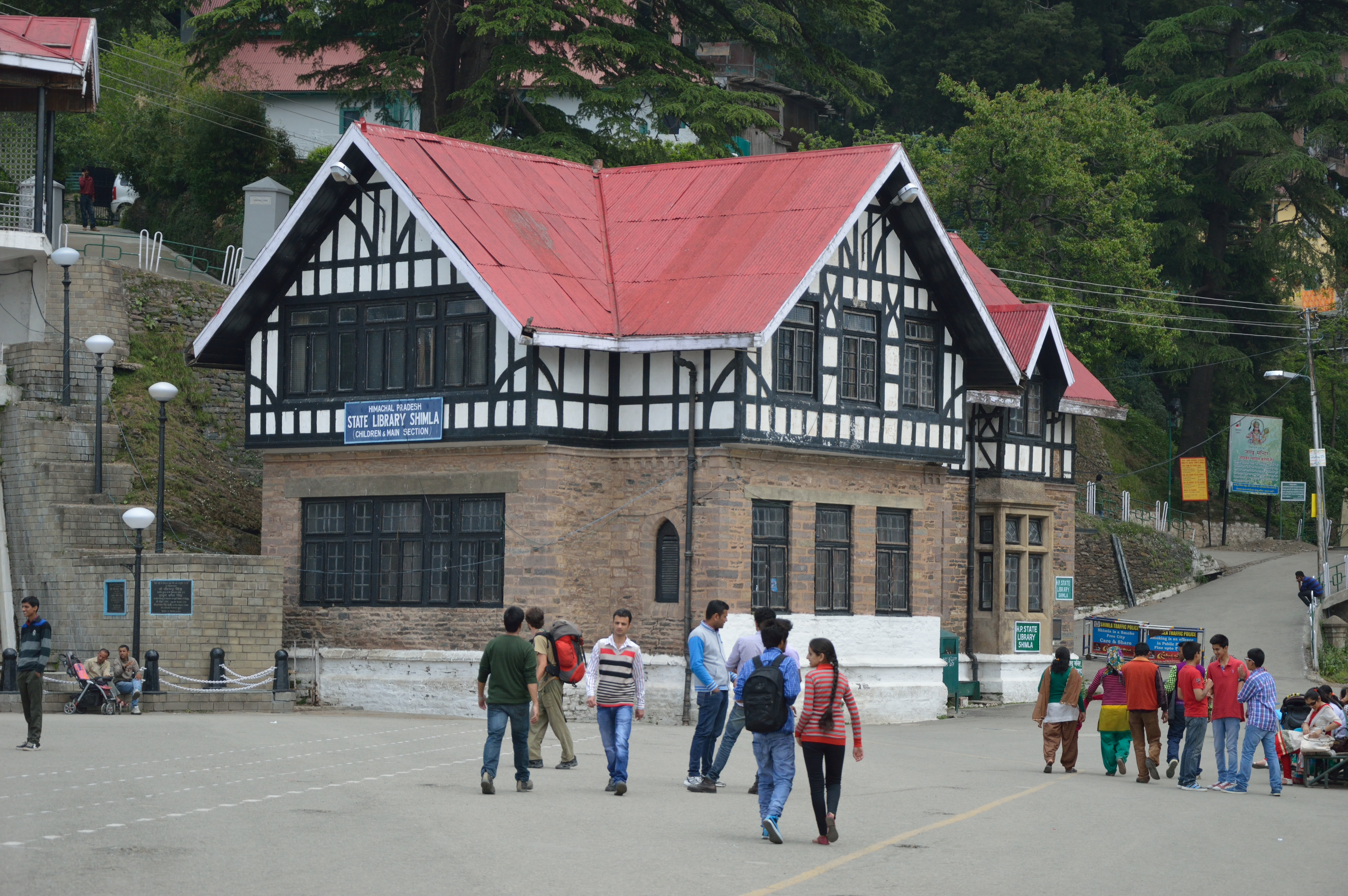
Public library on The Ridge

The city has 13 anganwadis and 64 primary schools. There are many schools from the British era. Some of the popular convent schools in the city are Bishop Cotton School, Convent of Jesus and Mary (Chelsea), St. Edward's School, Auckland House School, Loreto Convent (Tara Hall). Bishop Cotton School and St. Edward's School are for boys only, whereas, Loreto Convent, Tara Hall and Convent of Jesus and Mary, Chelsea is for girls only. Other public schools include Himalayan International School and S.D. Senior Sec Secondary School.

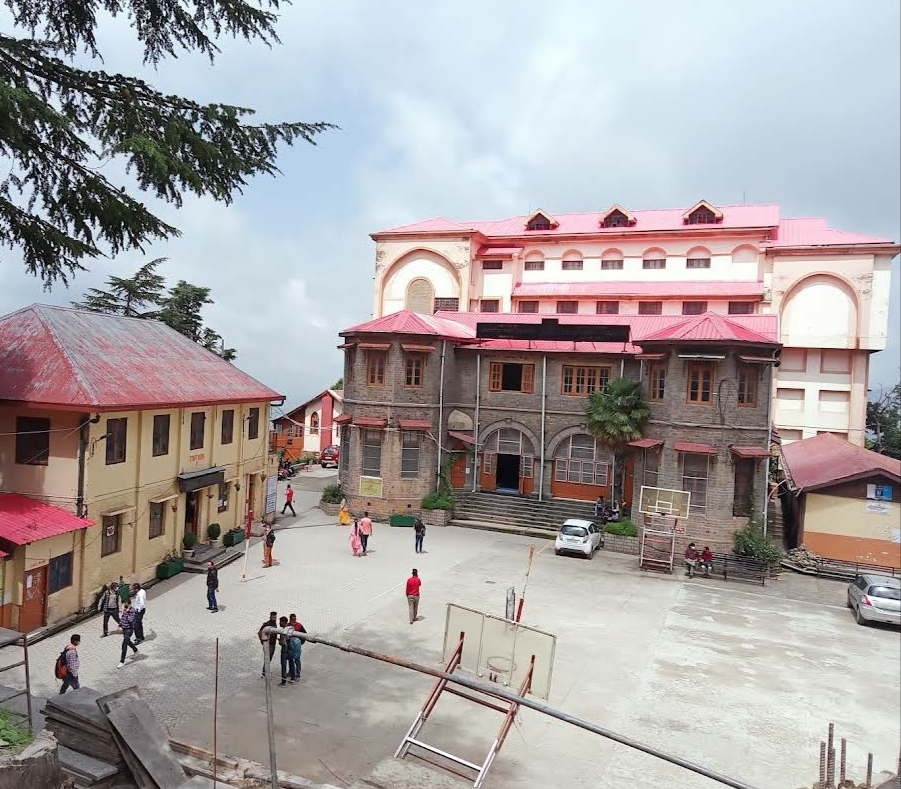
Govt. College Sanjauli, a major college of the city

The major medical institute in Shimla is Indira Gandhi Medical College and degree colleges include St. Bede's College, RKMV College are two girls colleges and co-educational colleges in the city include Government College Sanjauli. The Indian Institute of Advanced Study, housed in the Viceregal Lodge, is a residential centre for research in Humanities, Indian culture, religion, and social and natural sciences. The Himachal Pradesh University (state university of Himachal Pradesh) is also located in Shimla. Himachal Pradesh University Business School (HPUBS) and University Institute of Information Technology, Himachal Pradesh University (UIIT), a premier technical education institute, Himachal Pradesh National Law University, Shimla are also located here.

There is one private university, APG (Alakh Prakash Goyal) Shimla University. It was named the Best University in Hills by Assocham India.

Shimla has four state libraries with a collection of over 47,000 old books divided between them. The one at Gandhi Bhavan in the university has over 40,000 books and the other also a heritage building on the ridge has 7,000, another is Baba Bhimrao Ambedkar State Library located near Vidhan Sabha and another is in Evening College on Bantony Hill.

Other institutes of higher education and research located in Shimla are the Central Potato Research Institute, a member of Indian Council of Agricultural Research (ICAR) and the National Academy of Audit and Accounts for the training of officers of the Indian Audits and Accounts Service (IA&AS).

Since 2022, Dhami, near Shimla, hosts the Himalayan Institute of Cultural and Heritage Studies (HICHS). HICHS is dedicated to promoting knowledge and research on diverse Himalayan subjects.

== Places of interest ==
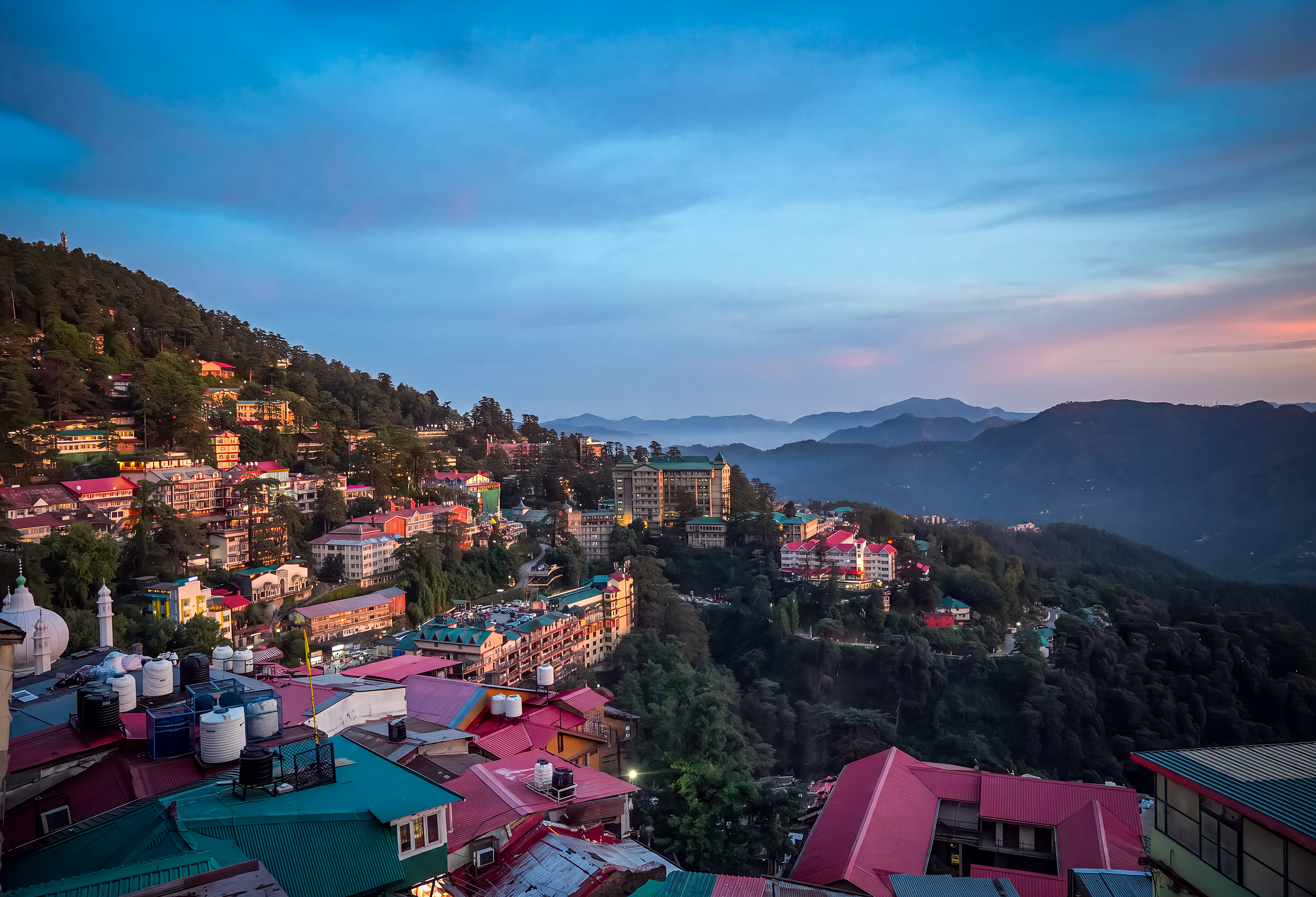
Shimla, A view from Mall Road

- The Mall is the main shopping street of Shimla.
- The Ridge is a large open space alongside the Mall Road
- Christ Church is on the Ridge, as is the Gaiety Heritage Cultural Complex.
- Jakhoo – Jakhoo temple is 2 km from The Ridge, at a summit elevation of 2,400 m (8,000 ft), Jakhoo Hill is the highest peak in the city.
- Kali Bari is a temple of the Hindu goddess Kali's incarnation Matangi.
- Annadale was developed as the racecourse of Shimla.
- Indian Institute of Advanced Studies is an educational institute at the former Viceregal Lodge, built-in 1884–88.
- Himachal Pradesh State Museum
- Summer Hill
- Sankat Mochan Temple is a Hindu temple of Hanuman.
- Tara Devi Temple.
- Sanjauli is the main suburb of Shimla.
- Dhingu Mata Temple is atop a hill in Sanjauli..
- Chharabra is near Kufri..
- Jutogh is an army cantonment 8 km from Shimla city centre.

== Transport ==
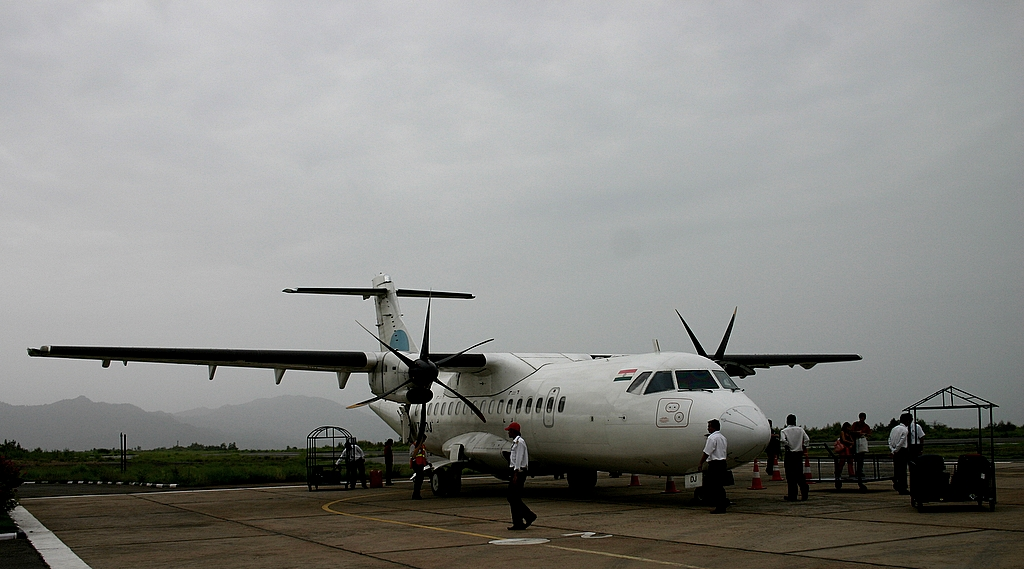
Aircraft at Shimla Airport

Shimla Airport is at Jubbarhatti, 23 kilometres (14 mi) from the city. Regular flights to Delhi operate from the airport.

=== Rail ===
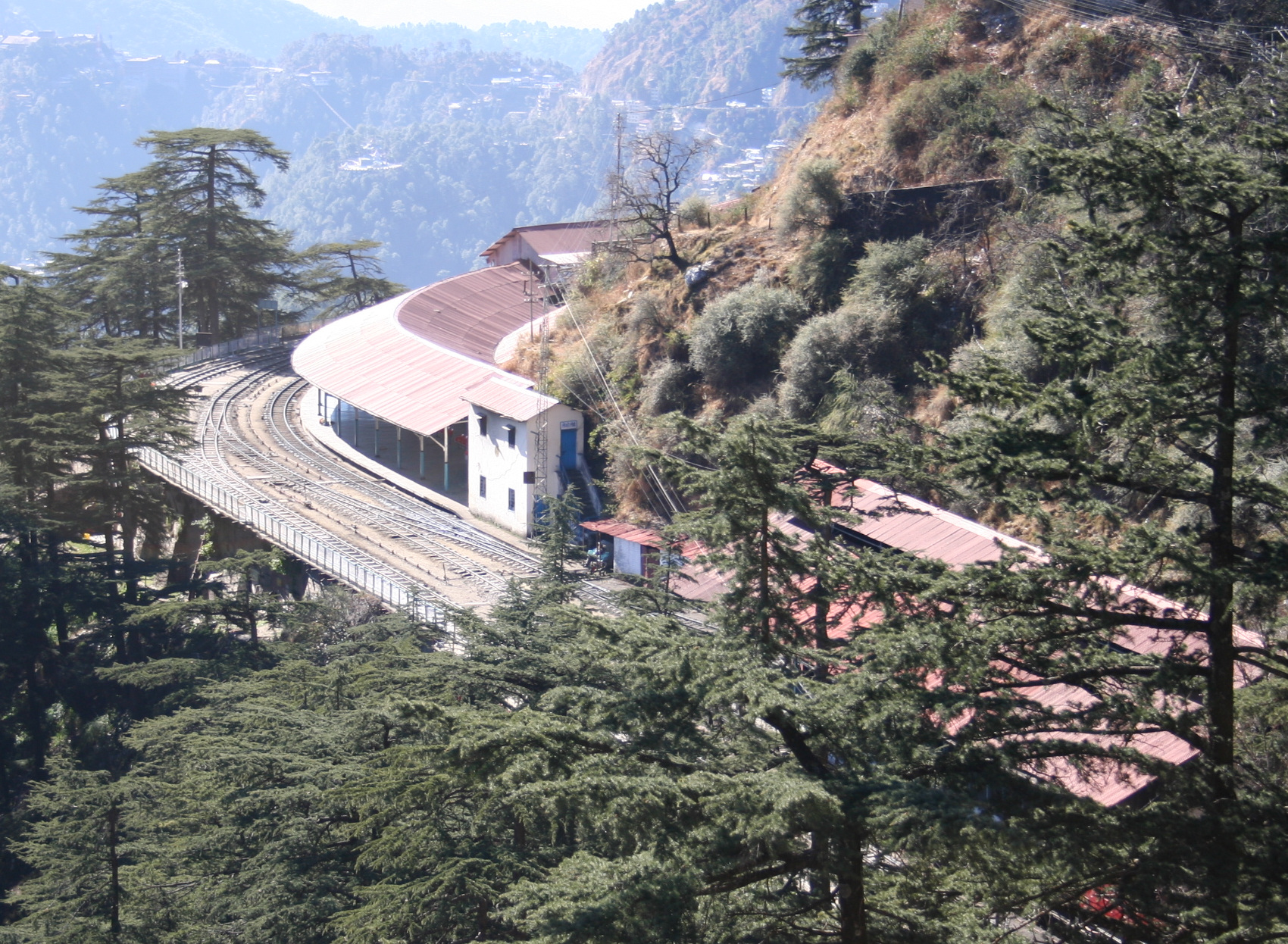
Shimla railway station

The scenic Kalka Shimla Railway, a narrow gauge track, is listed in the Guinness Book of Records for the steepest rise in altitude in a distance of 96 km.

In 2007, the government of Himachal Pradesh declared the railway a heritage property. For about a week starting on 11 September 2007, an expert team from UNESCO visited the railway to review and inspect it for possible selection as a World Heritage Site. On 8 July 2008, the Kalka–Shimla Railway was listed as a World Heritage Site, alongside Darjeeling Himalayan Railway, Nilgiri Mountain Railway, and Chhatrapati Shivaji Terminus.

== Media and communications ==
State-owned All India Radio and Reliance Broadcast owned 95.0 BIG FM have local radio stations in Shimla, which transmit various programmes of mass interest. Apart from a wide range of other national and international TV channels of different languages, the national TV broadcaster Doordarshan also broadcast channels like DD Shimla, DD National and DD Sports in the city. There are several private FM radio channels like 95.0 BIG FM and Radio Mirchi.

Amar Ujala, Punjab Kesari, and Dainik Bhaskar are the widely circulated Hindi dailies while The Tribune, The Times of India, Hindustan Times and Indian Express are popular English newspapers in the city.

== Notable people ==
- Javeed Alam, scholar, author, political activist
- M. S. Banga, businessman, former CEO, fund manager
- Raaja Bhasin, writer, historian, television personality
- Kamayani Bisht, educator, poet, actress
- Lady Constance Bulwer-Lytton, writer and activist
- Victor Bulwer-Lytton, politician
- Shahid Javed Burki, Pakistani economist, born during British rule
- Charlie Chauhan, Indian actress
- Rubina Dilaik, television actress
- Guy Gibson, WWII RAF aviator, VC
- Horatio Boileau Goad, British policeman and former secretary of the municipal corporation of Shimla
- Samuel Boileau Goad, a principal property owner in Shimla
- O.C. Handa, historian
- S.R. Harnot, writer
- John Hunt, British army officer and mountaineer
- Robin Jackman, former England cricket player
- Celina Jaitly, Bollywood actress
- Ursula Jeans, British actress and wife of British actor Roger Livesey
- Shriniwas Joshi, columnist, theatre person, ex-civil servant
- Balak Ram Kashyap, Former MP and MLA of Shimla Lok Sabha constituency and Kasumpti Assembly constituency respectively
- Preneet Kaur, Indian aristocrat of Patiala and Kashmir dynasties, former Minister for External Affairs
- M. M. Kaye, novelist
- Rahat Kazmi, Pakistani television actor
- Anupam Kher, Bollywood actor
- Rudyard Kipling, English author
- Earl Kitchener, British viceroy
- Ram Kumar, painter
- Thakur Ram Lal, politician
- John Lea, Navy officer
- Ankit Love, leader of the One Love Party, Great Britain
- Elsie Mackay, British actress
- Simranjit Singh Mann, Sikh politician
- Jamila Massey, British actress
- Henry McMahon, British Indian army officer
- Ashish R Mohan, film director
- Diwan Dina Nath, Sikh Khalsa Diwan member
- Siddharth Pandey, writer, historian, photographer
- Meghna Pant, author and feminist
- Aalisha Panwar, Indian actress
- Mohinder Singh Pujji, WWII RAF and RIAF pilot, DFC
- Asghar Qadir, Pakistani cosmologist
- Javed Ashraf Qazi, former director of ISI
- Sadiq Hussain Qureshi, Governor of Punjab, Pakistan
- Motilal Rajvansh, Bollywood actor
- Priya Rajvansh, actress
- Kalpana Kartik, actress
- Sheila Ramani, Miss Shimla
- Hanif Ramay, former Chief Minister of Punjab
- Shafqat Rana, Pakistani test cricketer
- Pratibha Ranta, Indian actress
- Bruce Seton, British soldier and actor
- Idries Shah, writer on Sufism
- Anand Sharma, Former Union Minister and MP, Rajya Sabha
- Shreya Sharma, Indian actress
- Anwar Shemza, Kashmiri writer and radio broadcaster
- Chetan Singh, historian
- Mian Goverdhan Singh, writer and librarian
- Pratibha Singh, politician
- Renuka Singh, Indian cricketer
- Shakti Singh, Bollywood actor
- Asmita Sood, television actress
- Salman Taseer, Pakistani businessman
- Dhan Singh Thapa, Indian army officer
- Nirmal Verma, Hindi writer
- Sushma Verma, Indian cricketer
- Preity Zinta, Bollywood actress

== Sister cities ==
Sister relationships with towns and regions worldwide include:

- Carbondale, Illinois, United States
