= List of tourist attractions in Shimla =

This is list of tourist attractions in Shimla a city in Himachal Pradesh state of India.

- The Mall: The Mall is the main shopping street of Shimla. It has many restaurants, clubs, banks, bars, post offices, and tourist offices. The lower part of Gaiety Theatre lies there.
- The Ridge: The Ridge is a large open space, which is situated alongside the Mall Road and hosts all the cultural activities in the city. Christ Church situated on the Ridge, is the second oldest church in Northern India. Inside there are stained glass windows that represent faith, hope, charity, fortitude, patience, and humility. There are State Library and Gaiety Heritage Cultural Complex too which are some of the notable buildings located here.
- Jakhoo: 2 km (1.2 mi) from Shimla, at a height of 2,400 m (8,000 ft), Jakhu Hill is the highest peak in the city and has views of the city and of the snow-covered Himalayas. At the top of the hill is an old temple of Hanuman, a Hindu deity which is popular among tourists and locals alike. A 33 m (108 ft) statue of Hanuman, at 2,600 m (8,500 ft) above sea level, is the statue standing at the highest altitude among several other masterpieces in the world, overtaking the Christ Redeemer in Rio de Janeiro, Brazil. Jakhoo has ropeway also which connects Jakhoo temple to the ridge ground and is the first ropeway in Shimla.
- Kali Bari: Kali Bari is a temple dedicated to Goddess Kali's fearless incarnation Shyamala on which Shimla city is named. The extensive views from the temple include such sights as Annandale, Shima Railway Station, Railway Board Building, Old Bus Stand, ARTRAC, TV Tower, etc.
- Annandale: Developed as the racecourse of Shimla, Annandale is 2 km (1.2 mi)–4 km (2.5 mi) from the Ridge at a height of 1,864 m (6,117 ft). It is now used by the Indian Army. It has an Army Heritage Museum and a helipad. Every VVIP, VIP, or celebrity who visits Shimla comes by nhelipad. Annandale is one of the prime tourist sites of Shimla. First Durand Cup Football Tournament was organised here in 1888 by Mortimer Durand.
- Indian Institute of Advanced Study: This institute is housed at the former Viceregal Lodge, built-in 1884–88.
- Himachal Pradesh State Museum: The museum, which was opened in 1974, has tried to protect hill-out and the cultural wealth of the state. There is a collection of miniature Pahari paintings, sculptures, bronzes wood-carvings and also costumes, textiles, and jewellery of the region.
- Summer Hill: The township of Summer Hill is at a height of 2,000 m (6,500 ft) on the Shimla-Kalka railway line. Mahatma Gandhi lived in these quiet surroundings during his visits to Shimla. Himachal Pradesh University is situated here.
- Sankat Mochan: It is a famous Hindu temple dedicated to Hanuman.
- Tara Devi Temple : 11 km (6.8 mi) from the Shimla bus-stand. Tara Devi hill has a temple dedicated to the goddess of stars on top of the hill. There is a military Dairy Town here as well as the headquarters of Bharat Scouts and Guides.
- Jutogh: Located 8 km (5.0 mi) centre, this army cantonment is near Tutu, an important suburb of Shimla city.
- Dhingu Mata Temple: A Hindu temple located atop of Dhingu Dhar, above Sanjauli, a posh neighborhood of the city
- Kamna Devi Temple: Another prominent Hindu temple situated atop of Prospect Hill, which is one of the seven Hills of Shimla.

== Gallery ==
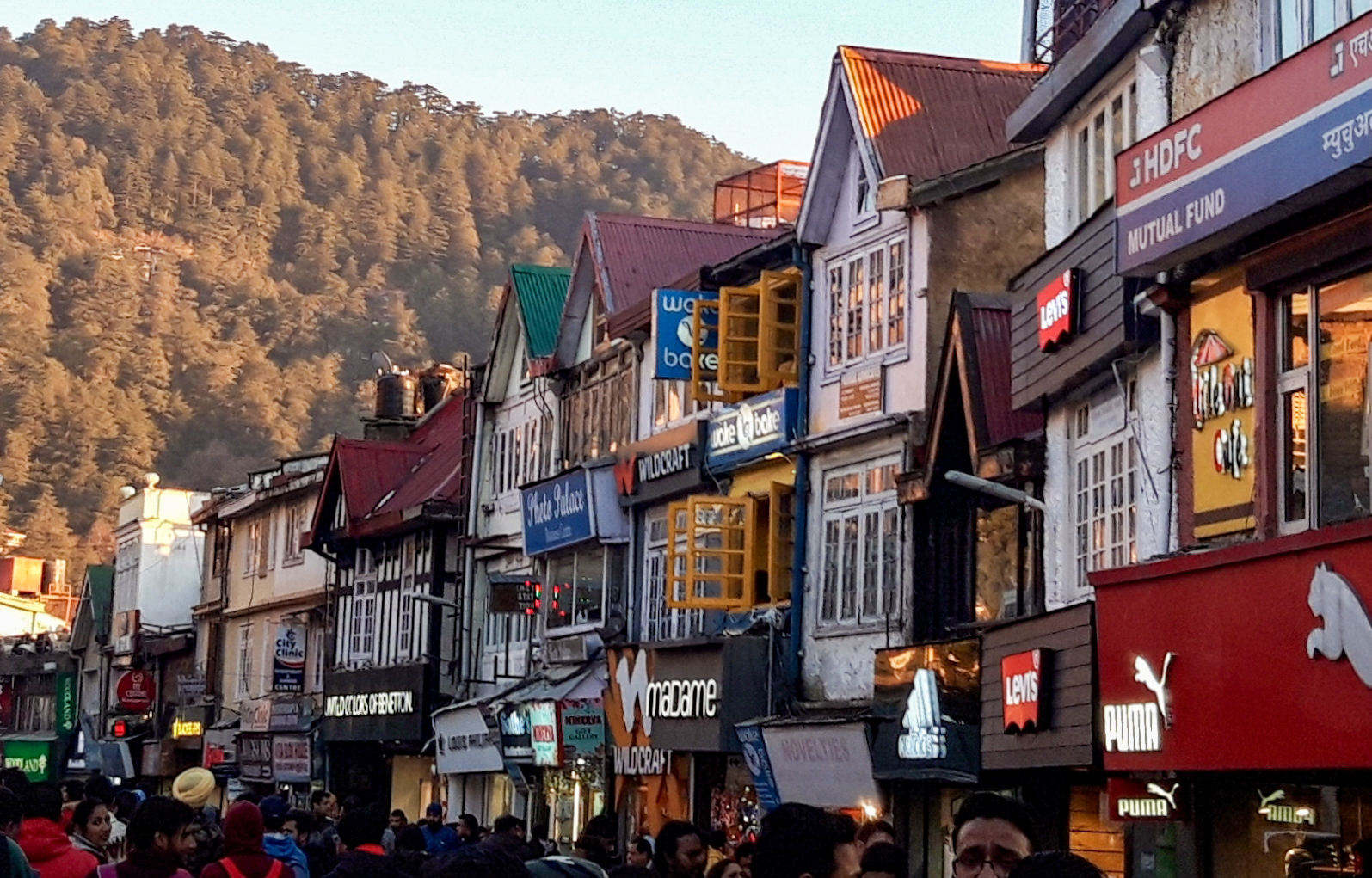
Mall Road, Shimla seen from the Scandal Point

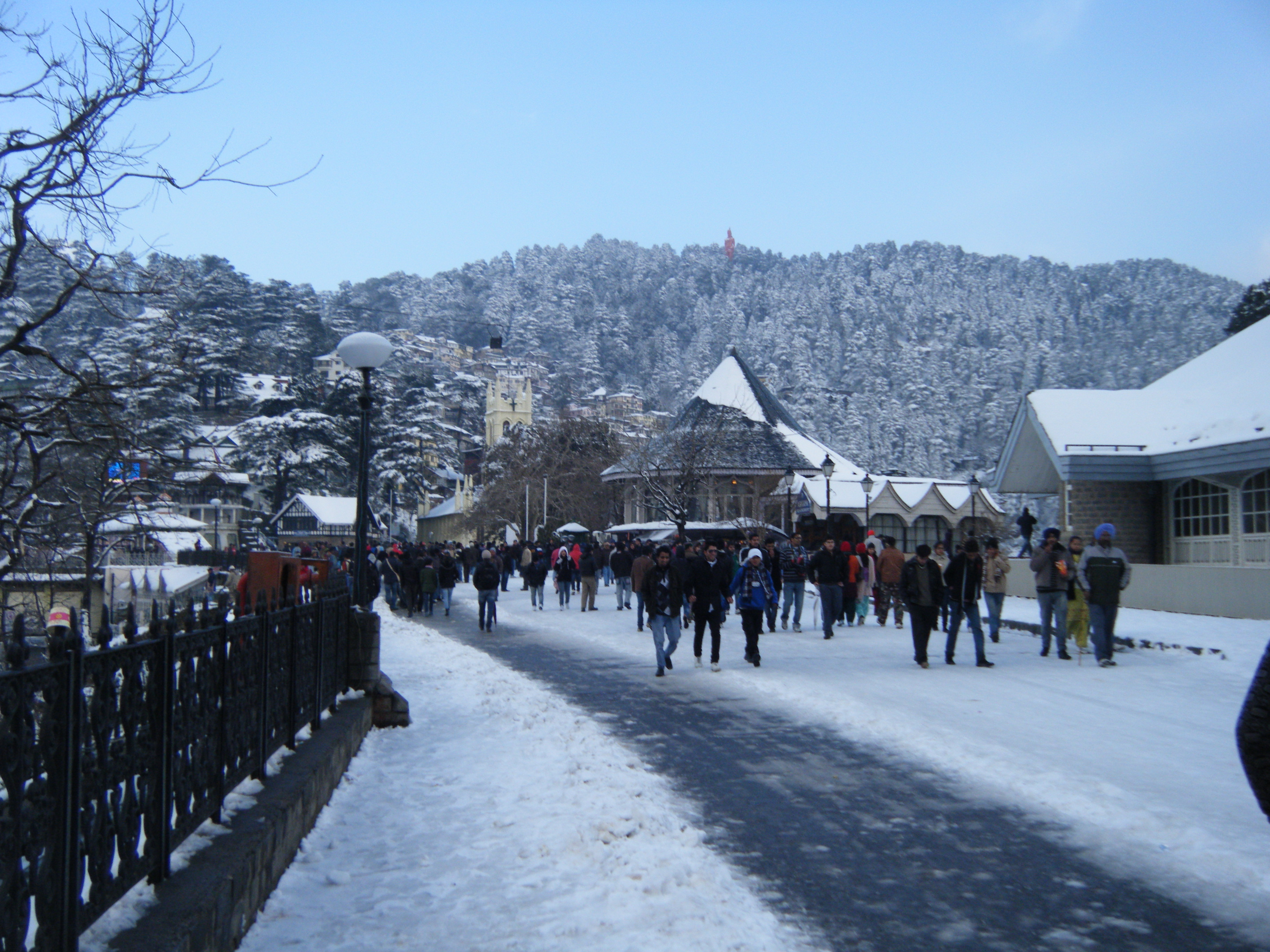
The Ridge, covered in snow

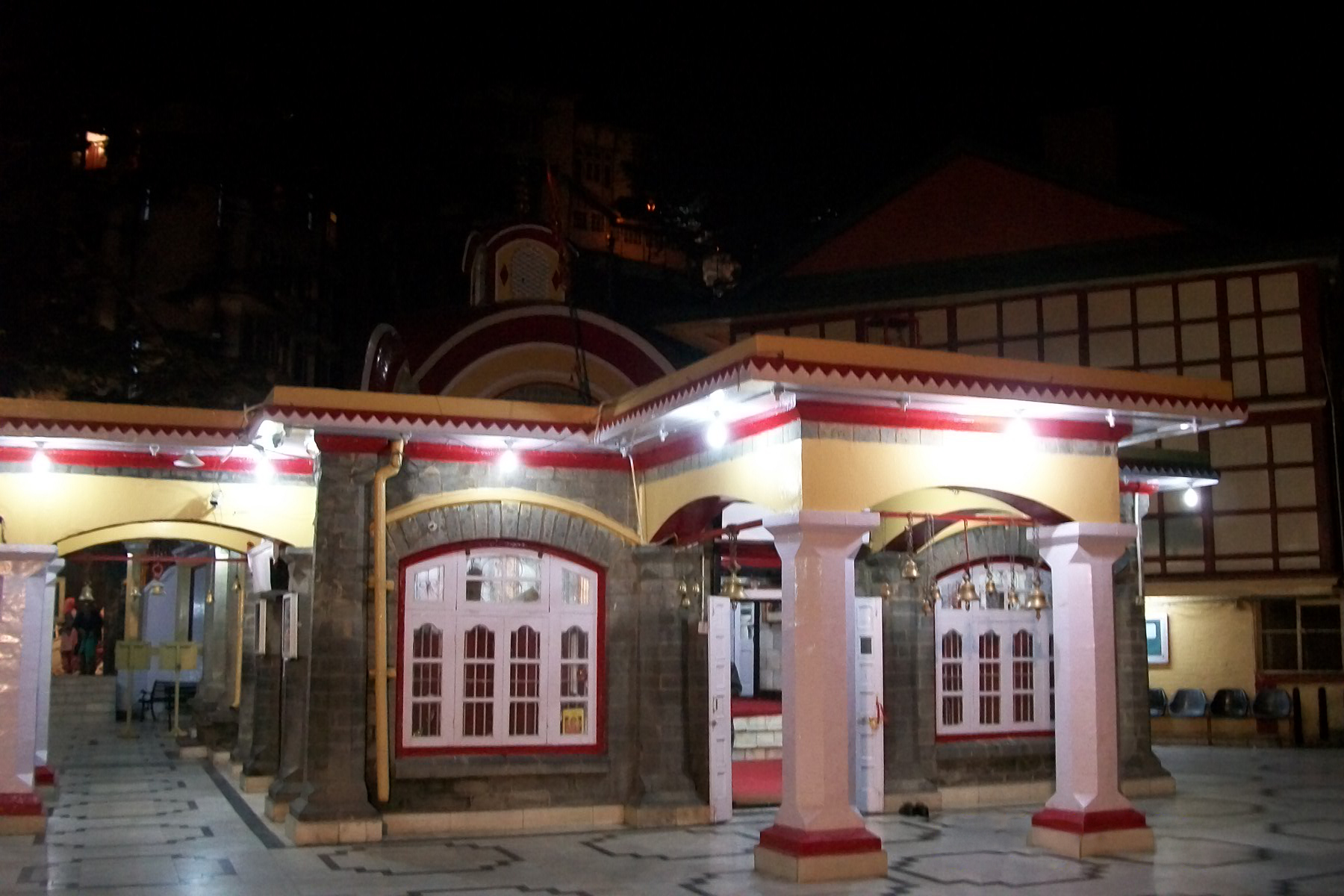
Kali Bari temple front view at night

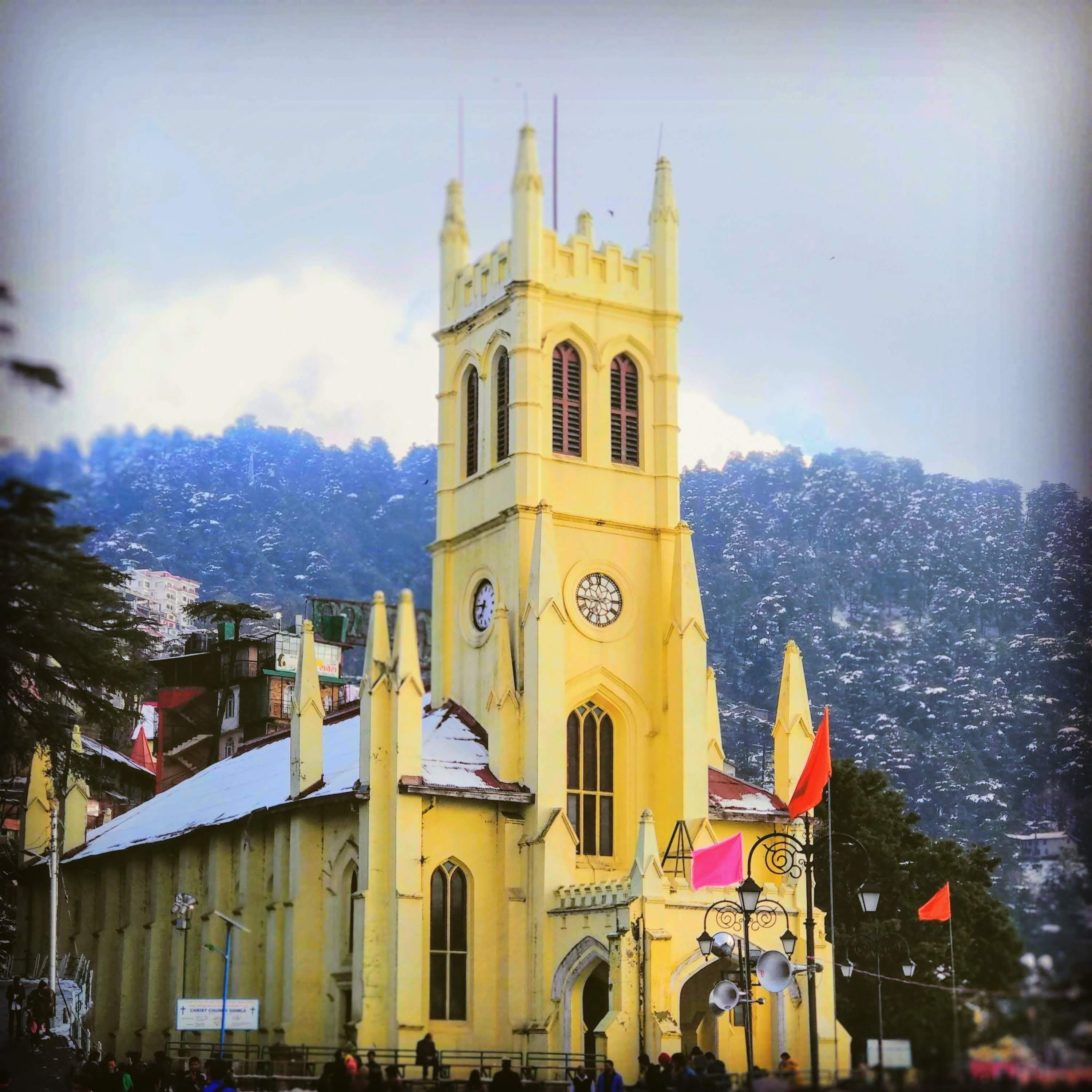
Christ Church in winter

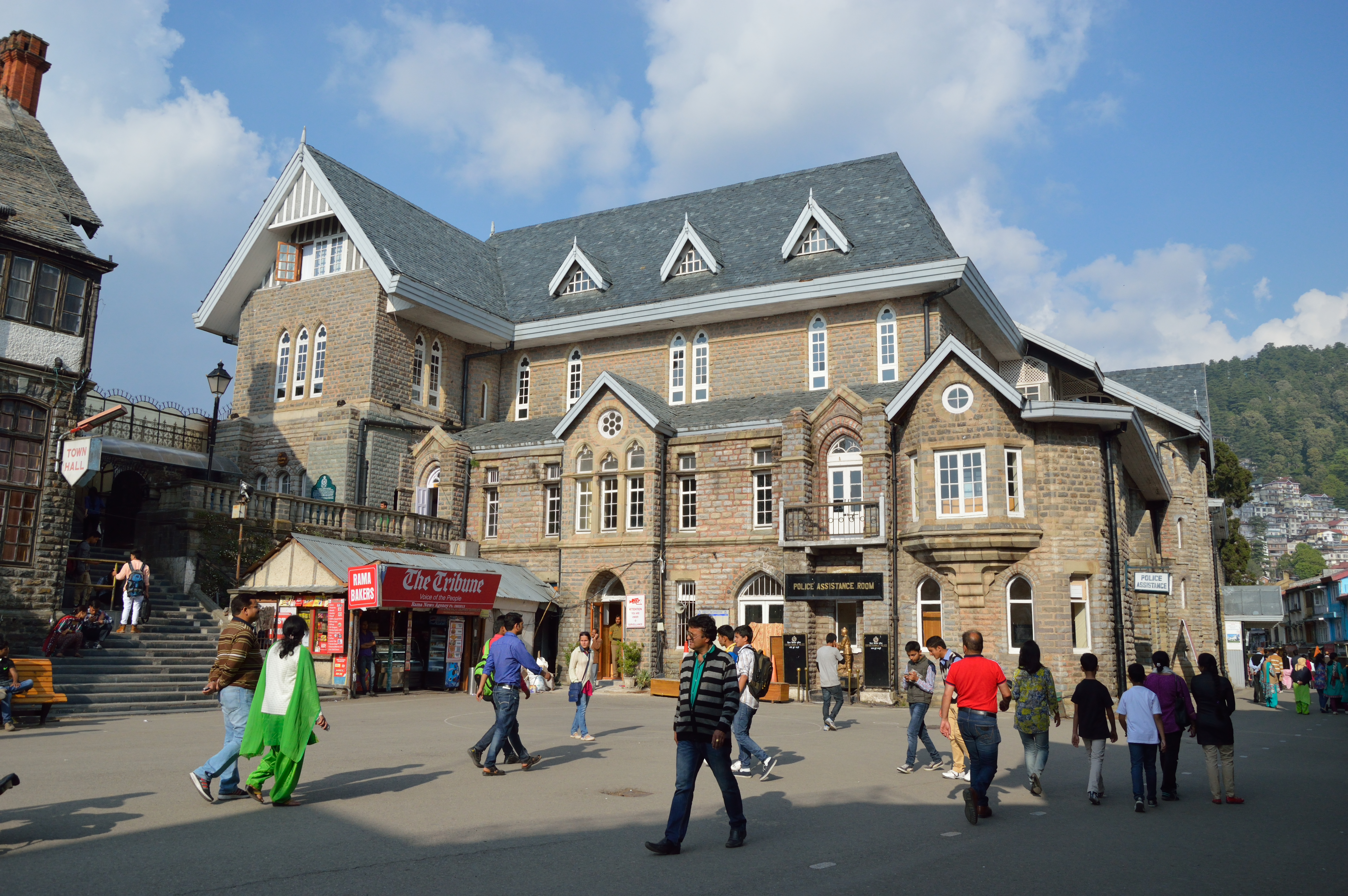
Gaiety Theatre

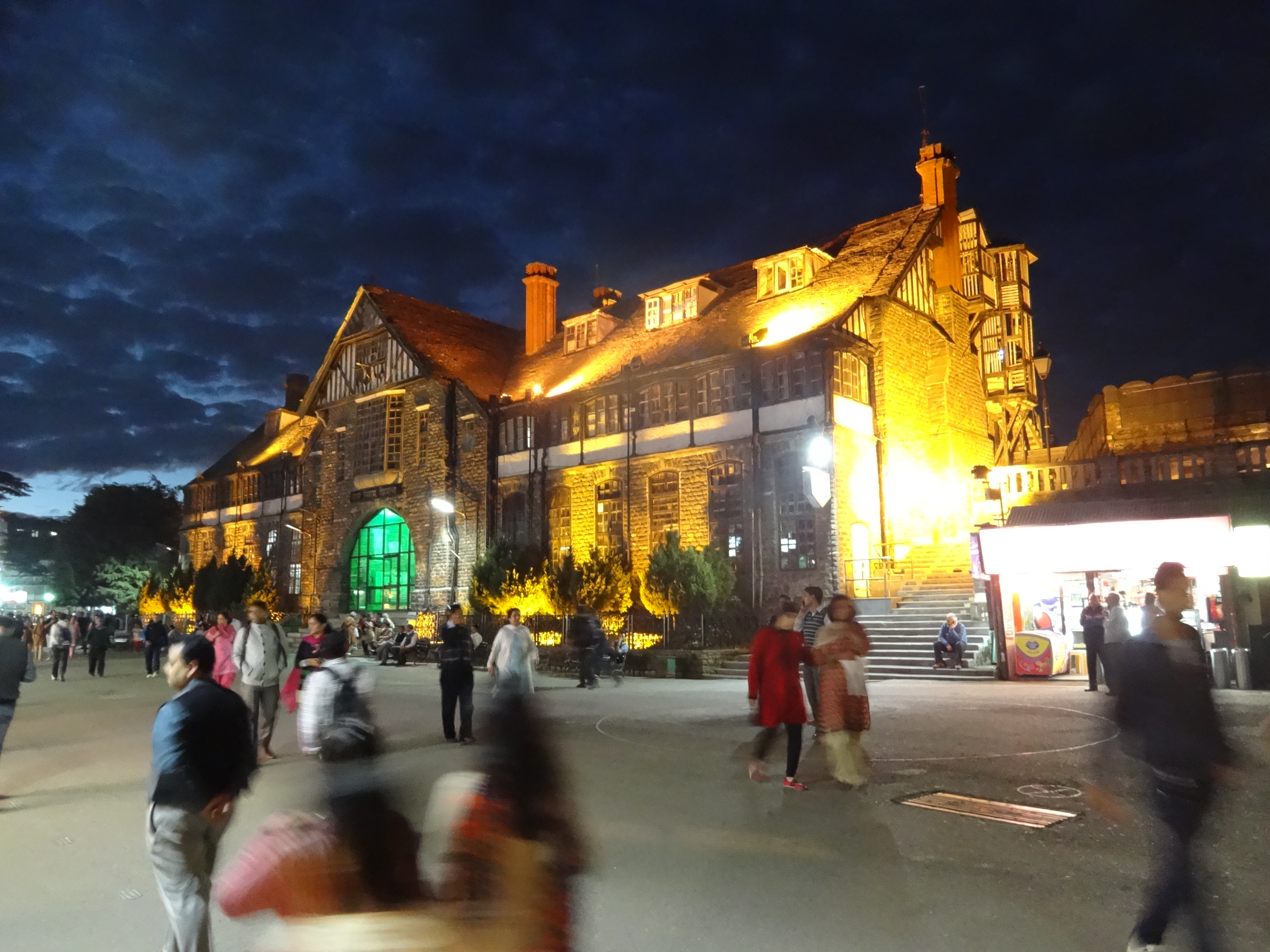
Shimla Town Hall

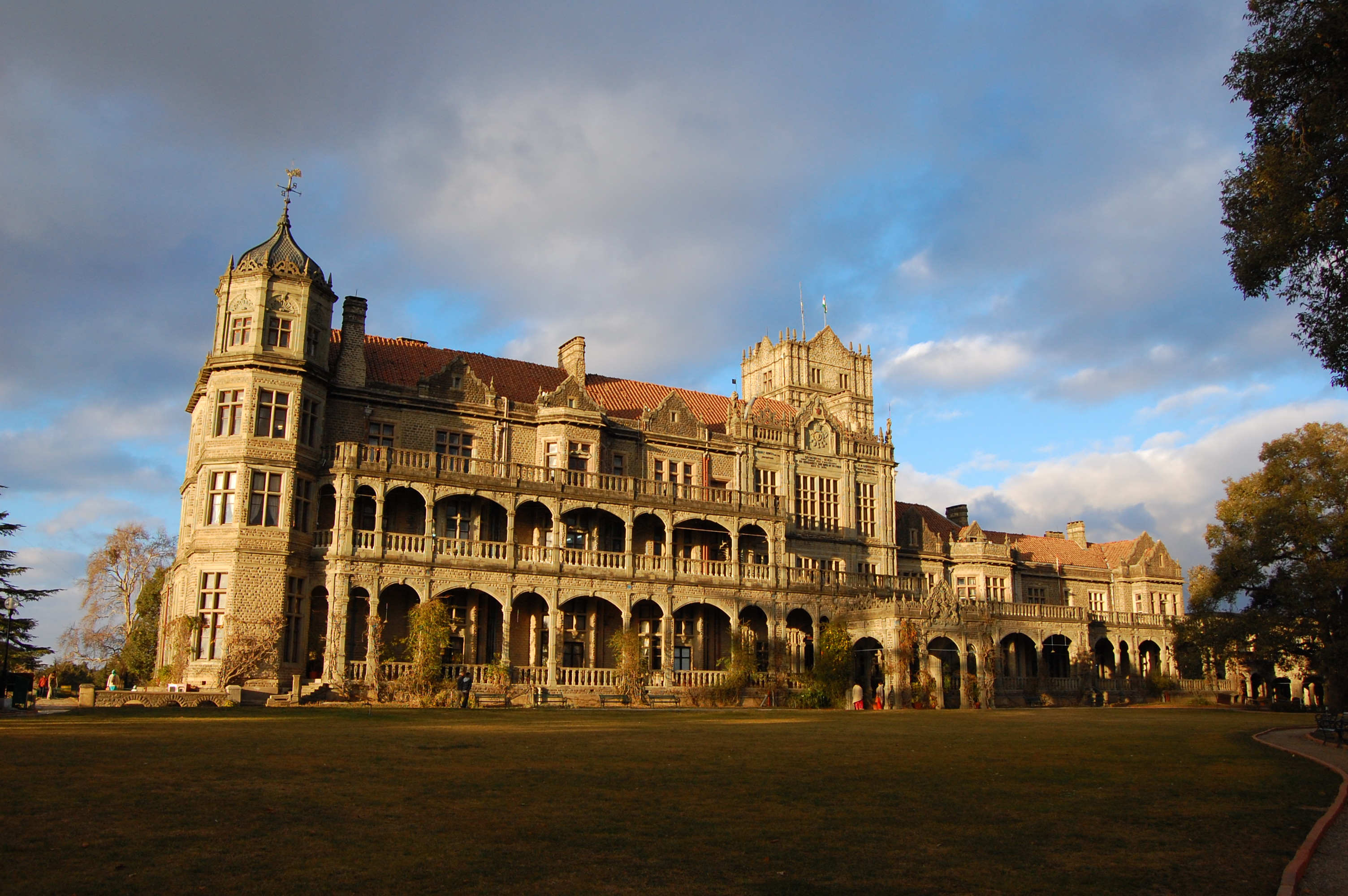
Rashtrapati Niwas, Shimla, former "Viceregal Lodge", built 1888. Now Indian Institute of Advanced Study

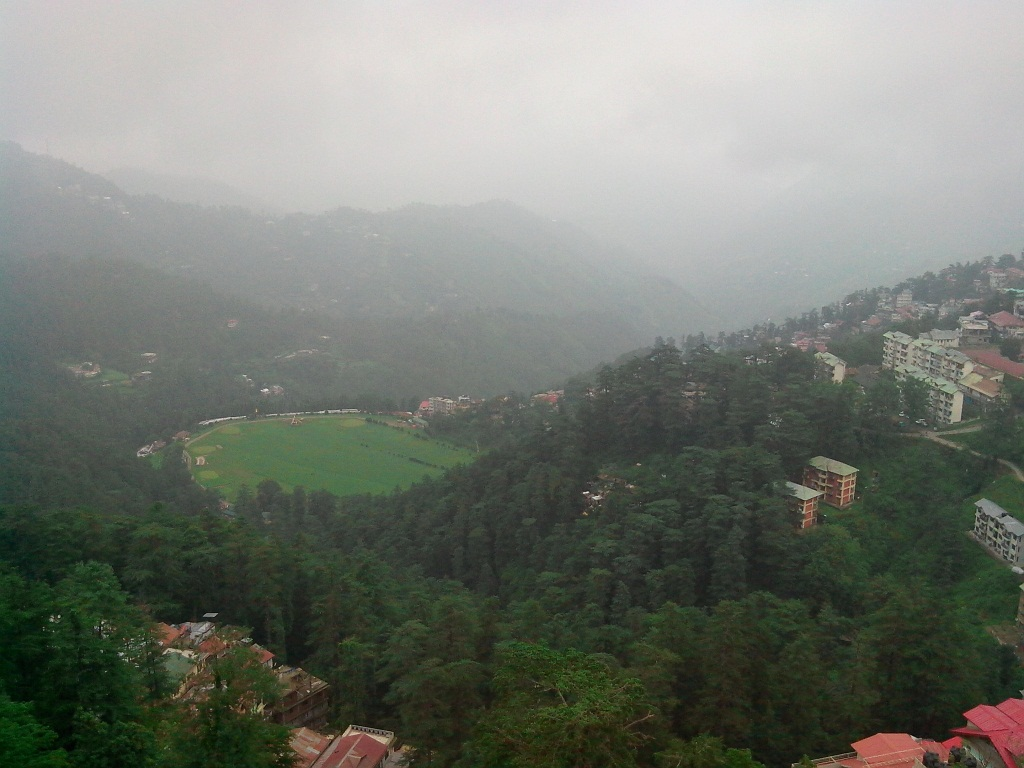
Annadale ground and suburb hilltop view

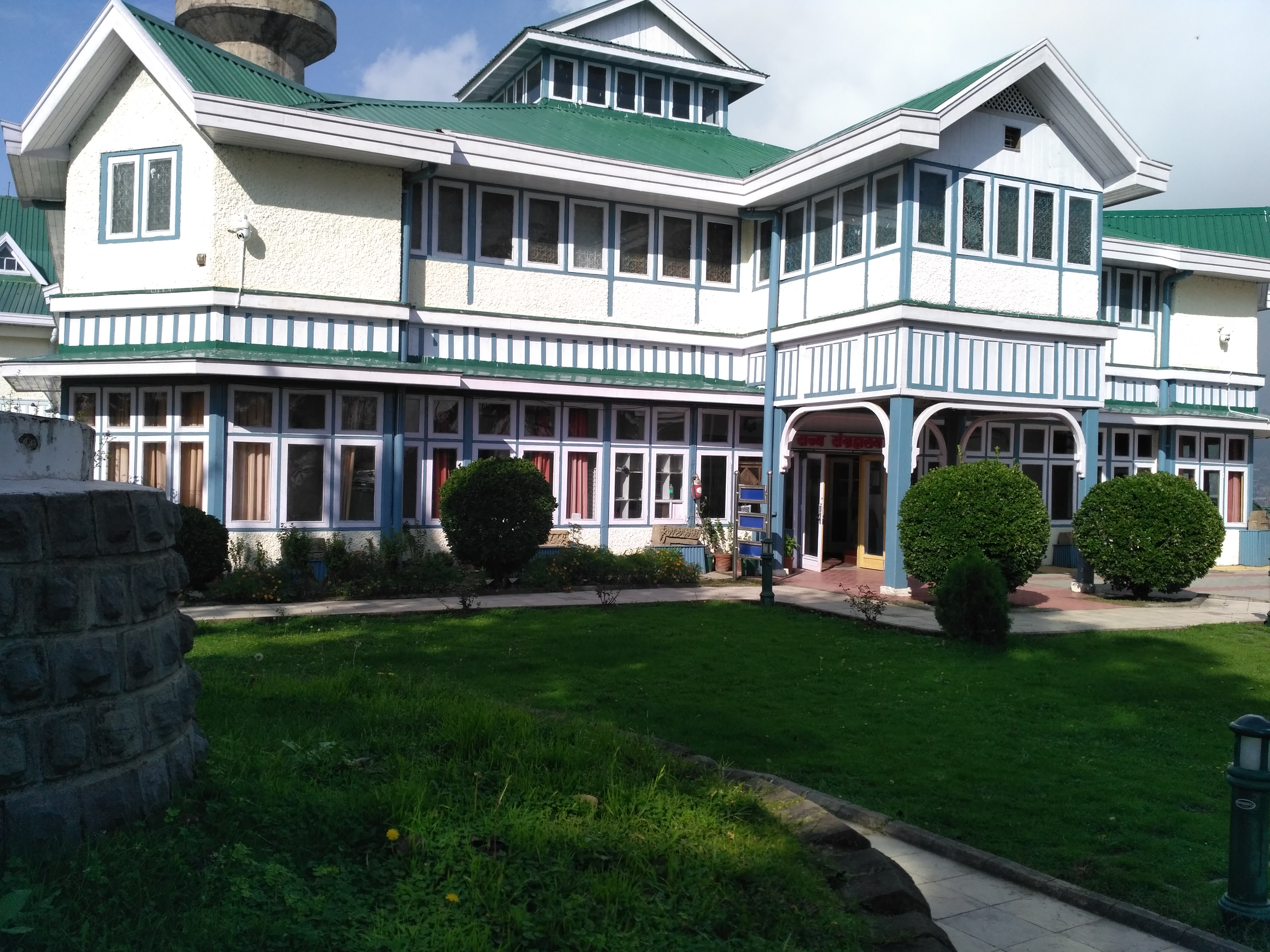
Himachal Pradesh State Museum

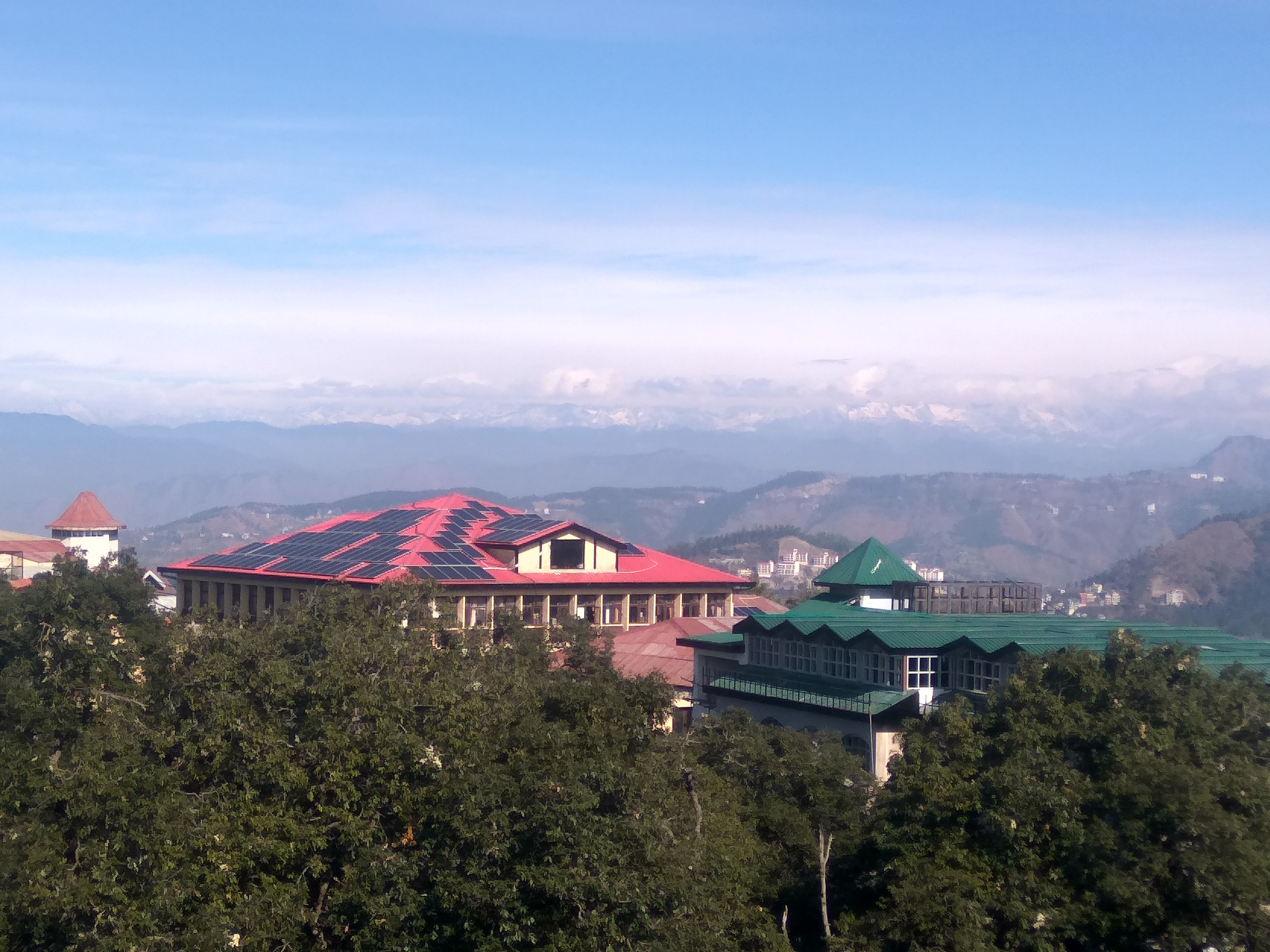
Uphill view of Summer Hill

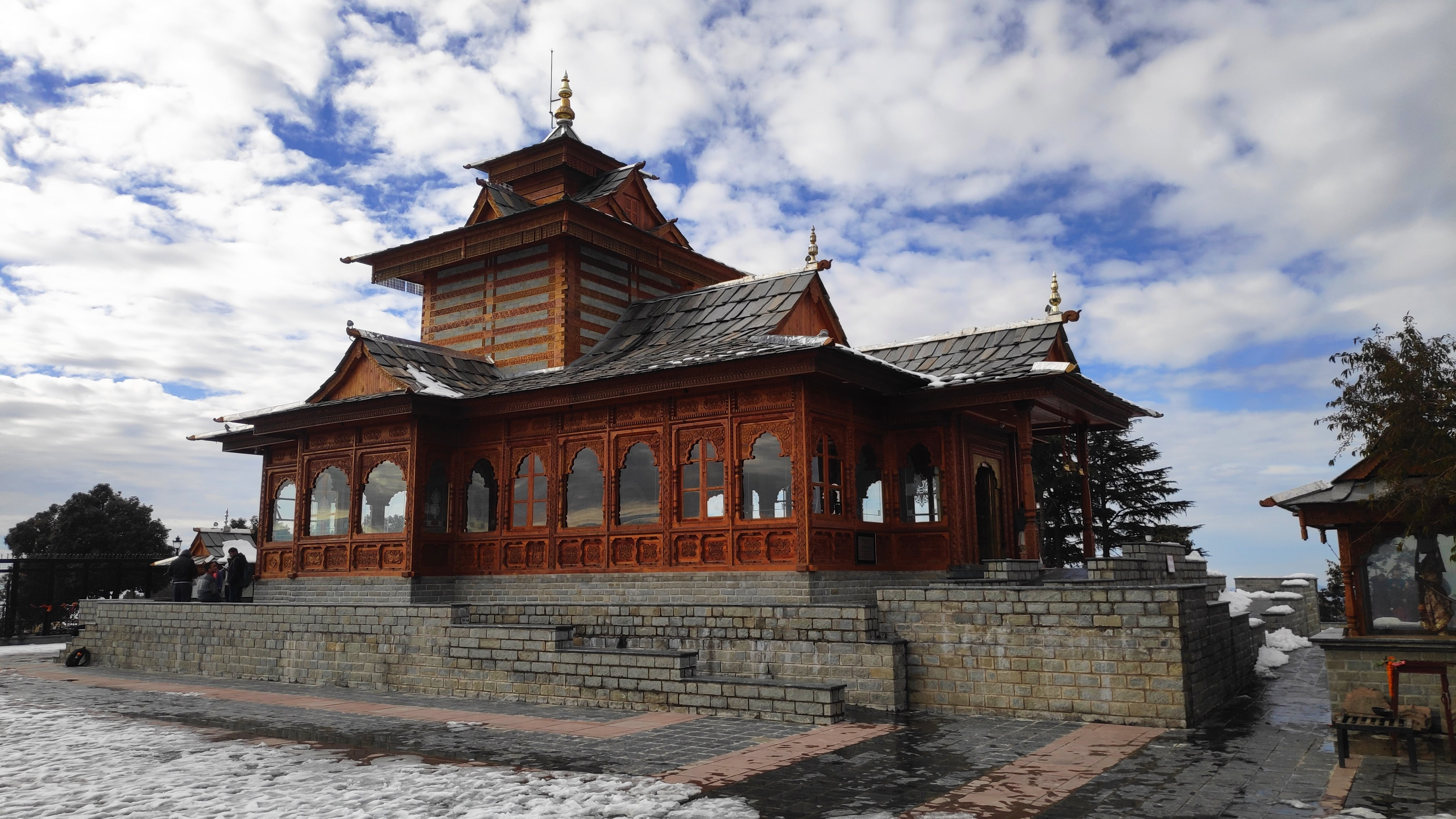
Tara Devi Temple side view

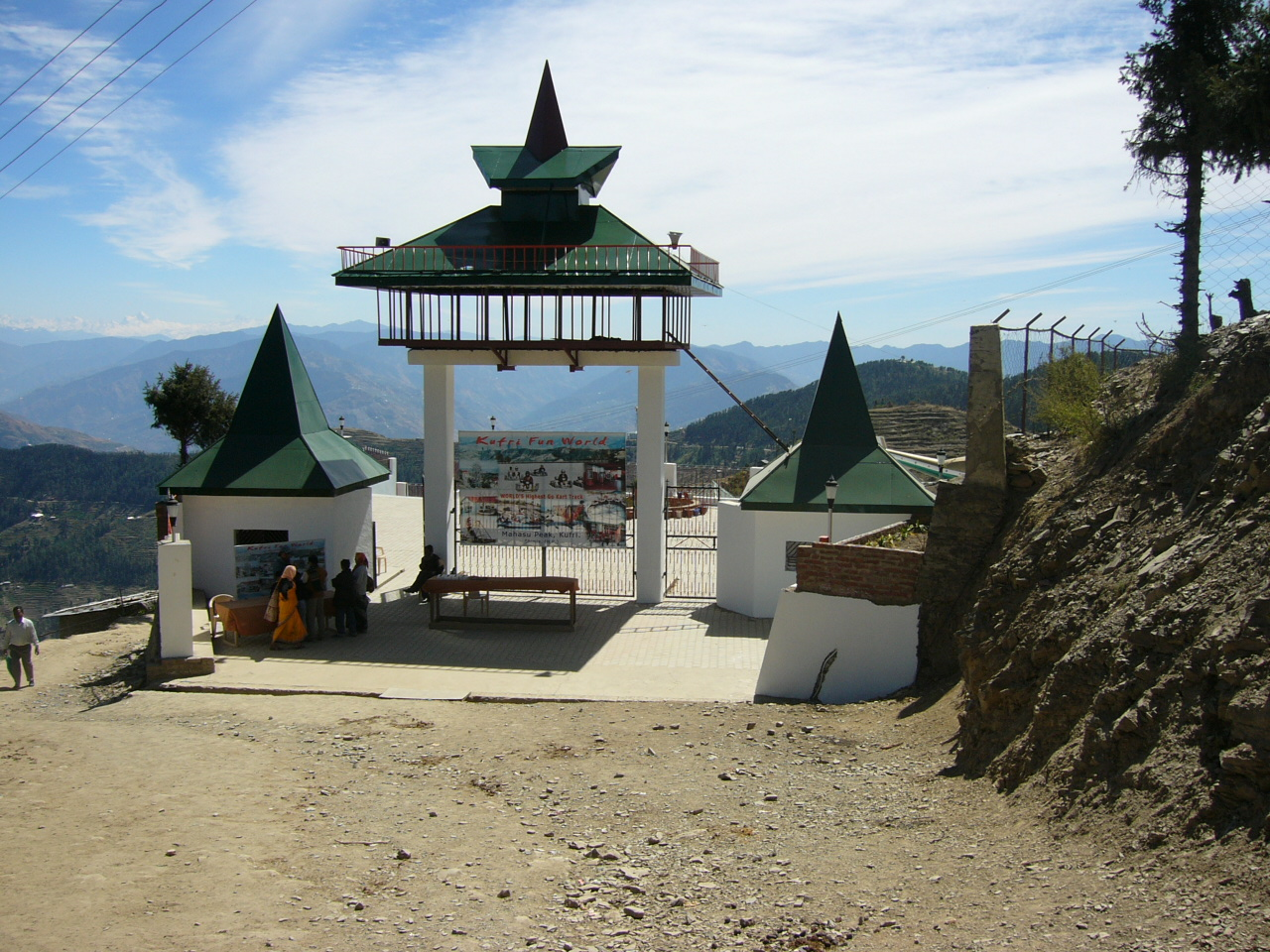
Kufri

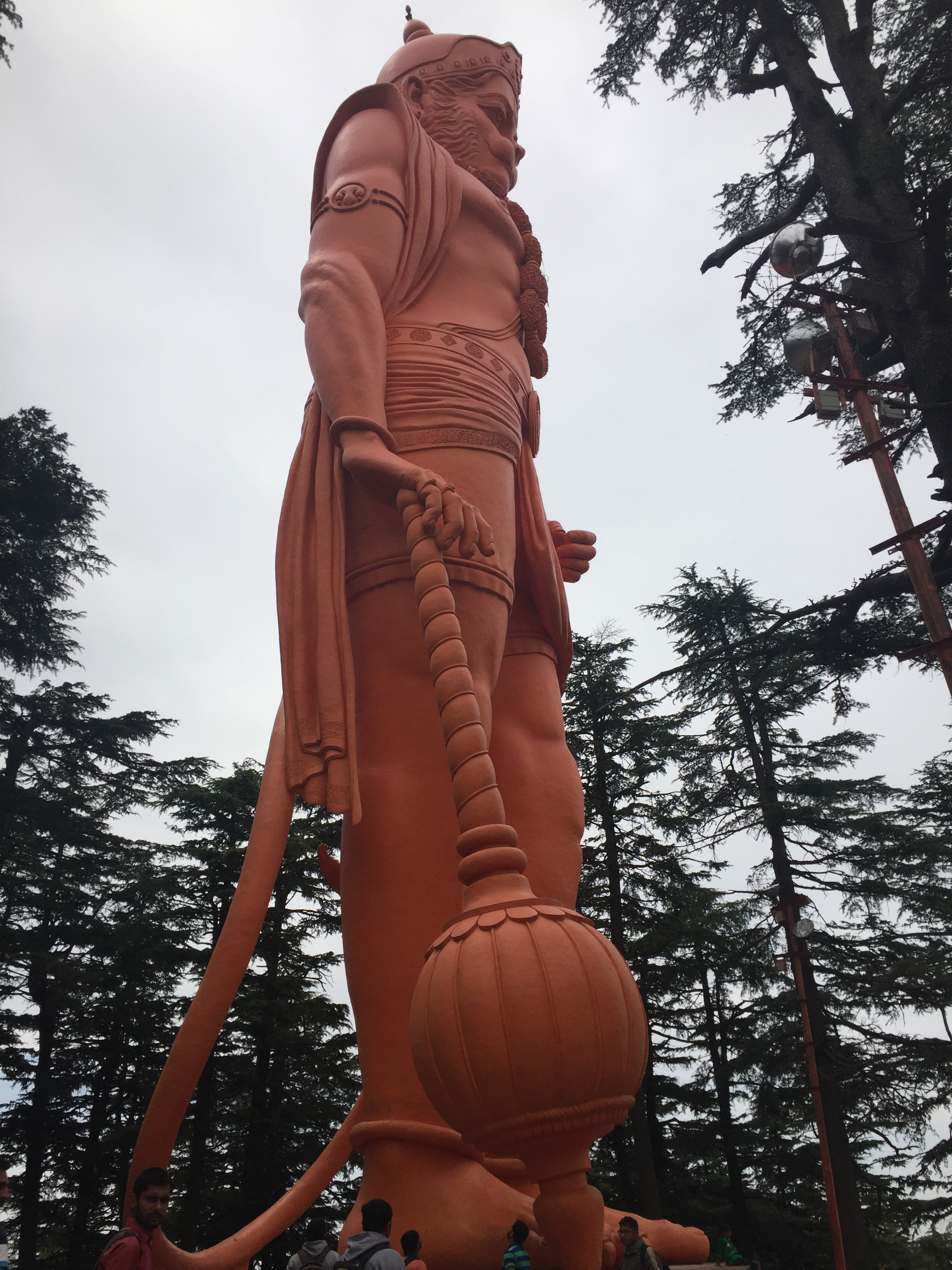
Jakhoo Temple situated on Jakhoo hill,

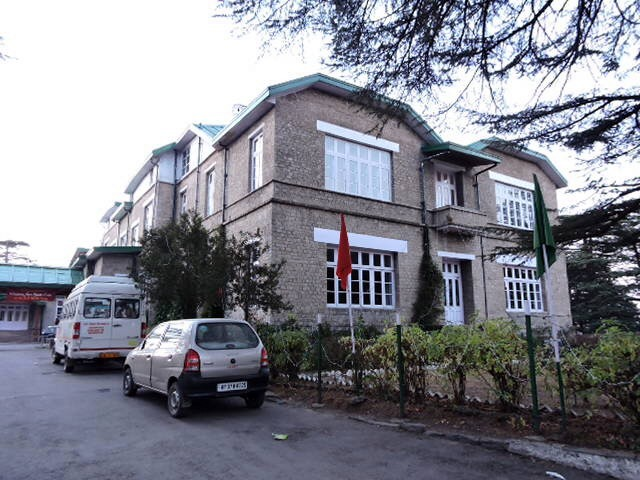
Chail Palace,

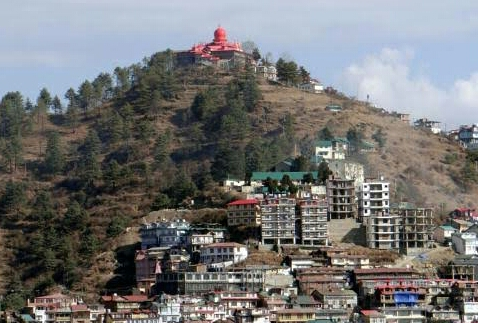
Dhingu Mata Temple atop of a hill

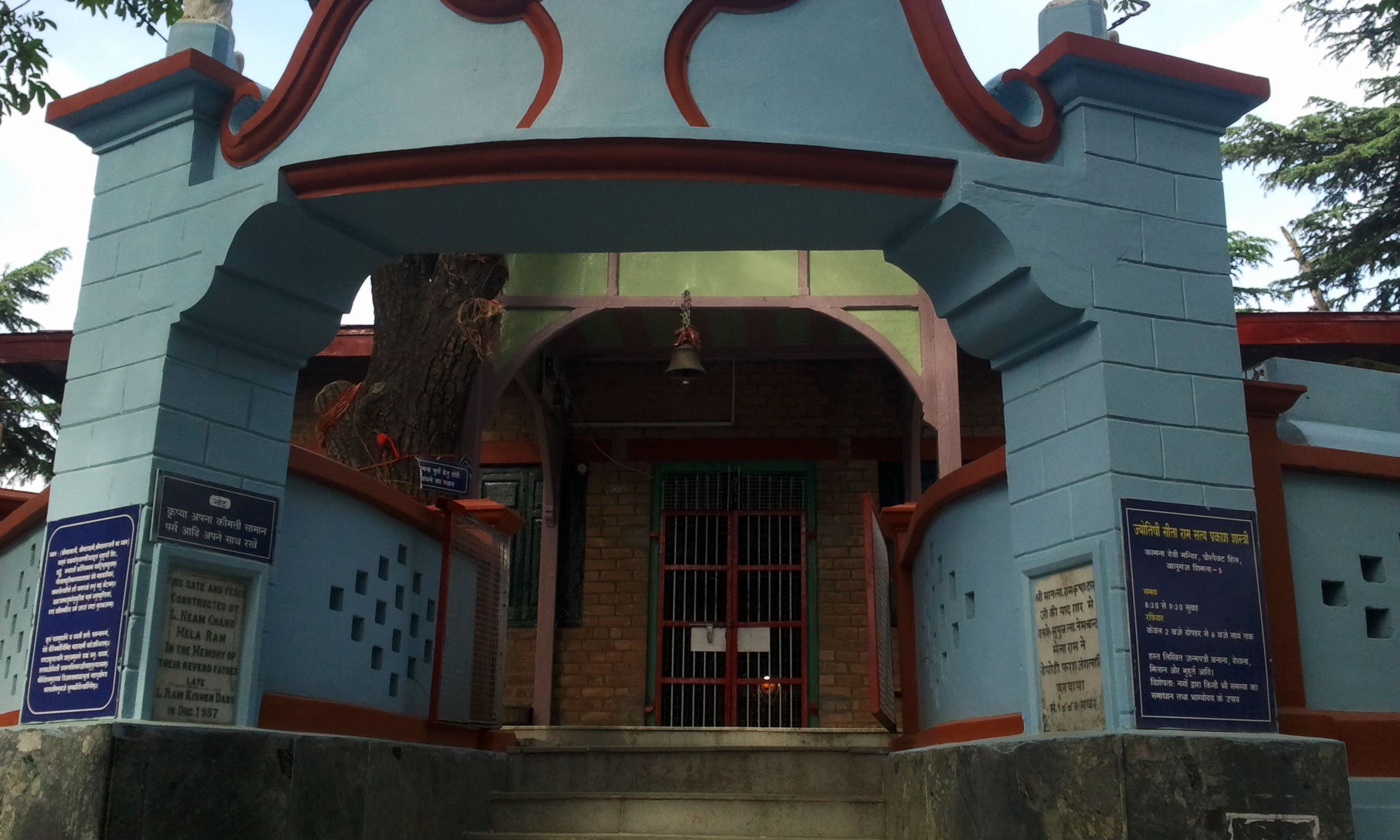
Kamna Devi Temple from its main gate
