= Boileauganj, Shimla =

Neighbourhood in Shimla, Himachal Pradesh, India

Boileauganj
- Neighbourhood
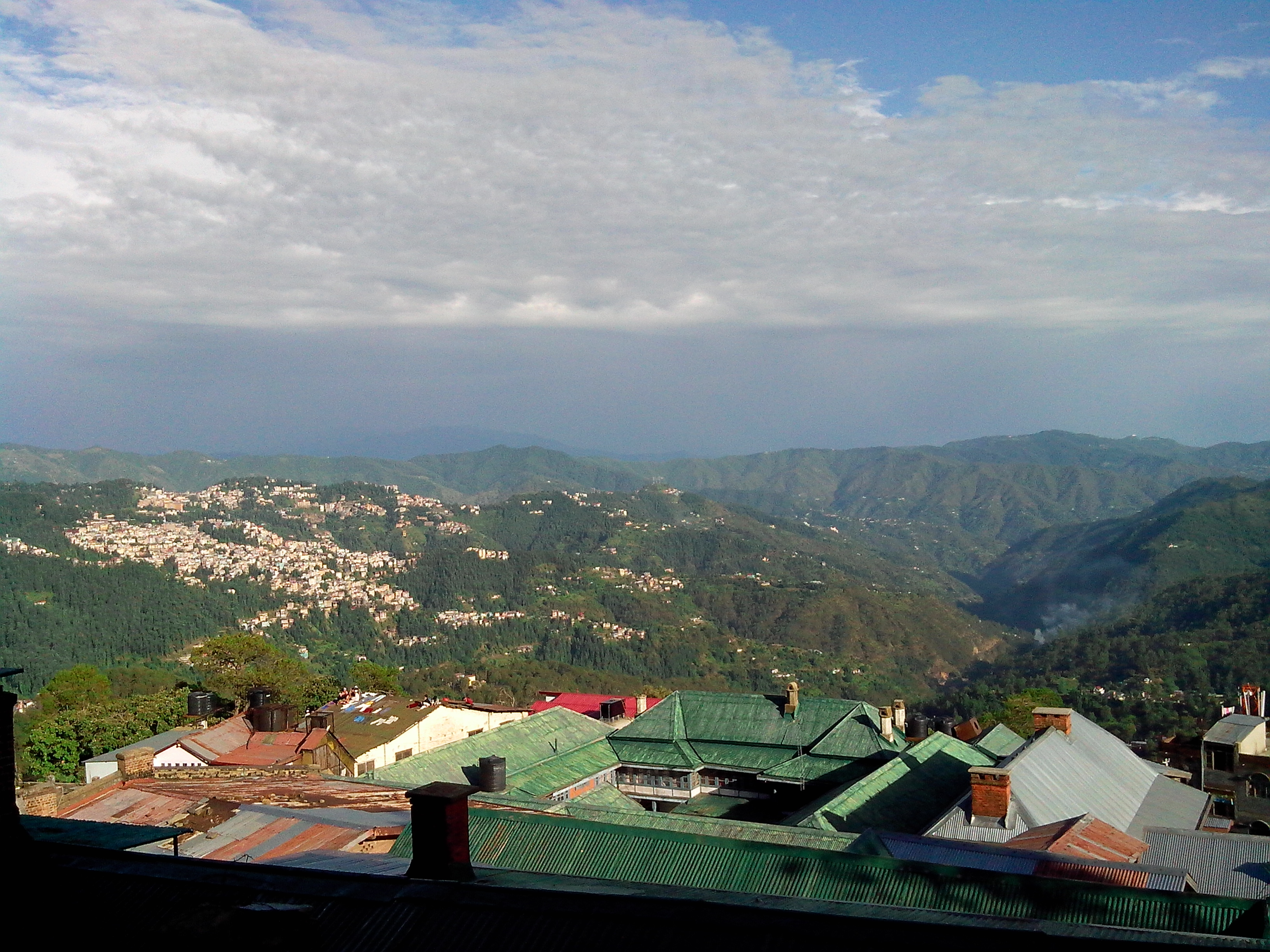
- View of Boileauganj
- Interactive map of Boileauganj
- Country: India
- State: Himachal Pradesh
- District: Shimla
- City: Shimla
- Elevation: 2,086 m (6,844 ft)
- PIN: 171005

Boileauganj is a part of Shimla in the North Indian state of Himachal Pradesh. Boileauganj is one of the old and historically important localities of Shimla. It lies on the western side of central Shimla. The area is known for its educational institutions, colonial-era surroundings, steep terrain, mixed residential character. It is a major junction point toward Summer Hill, Totu, and Chaura Maidan.

== Etymology ==
The name Boileauganj is believed to come from John Theophilus Boileau, a renowned British military engineer who designed the Christ Church in Shimla. The suffix “ganj” is of Persian-Hindustani origin and generally means a market area or settlement.

== Importance ==
=== Historical importance ===
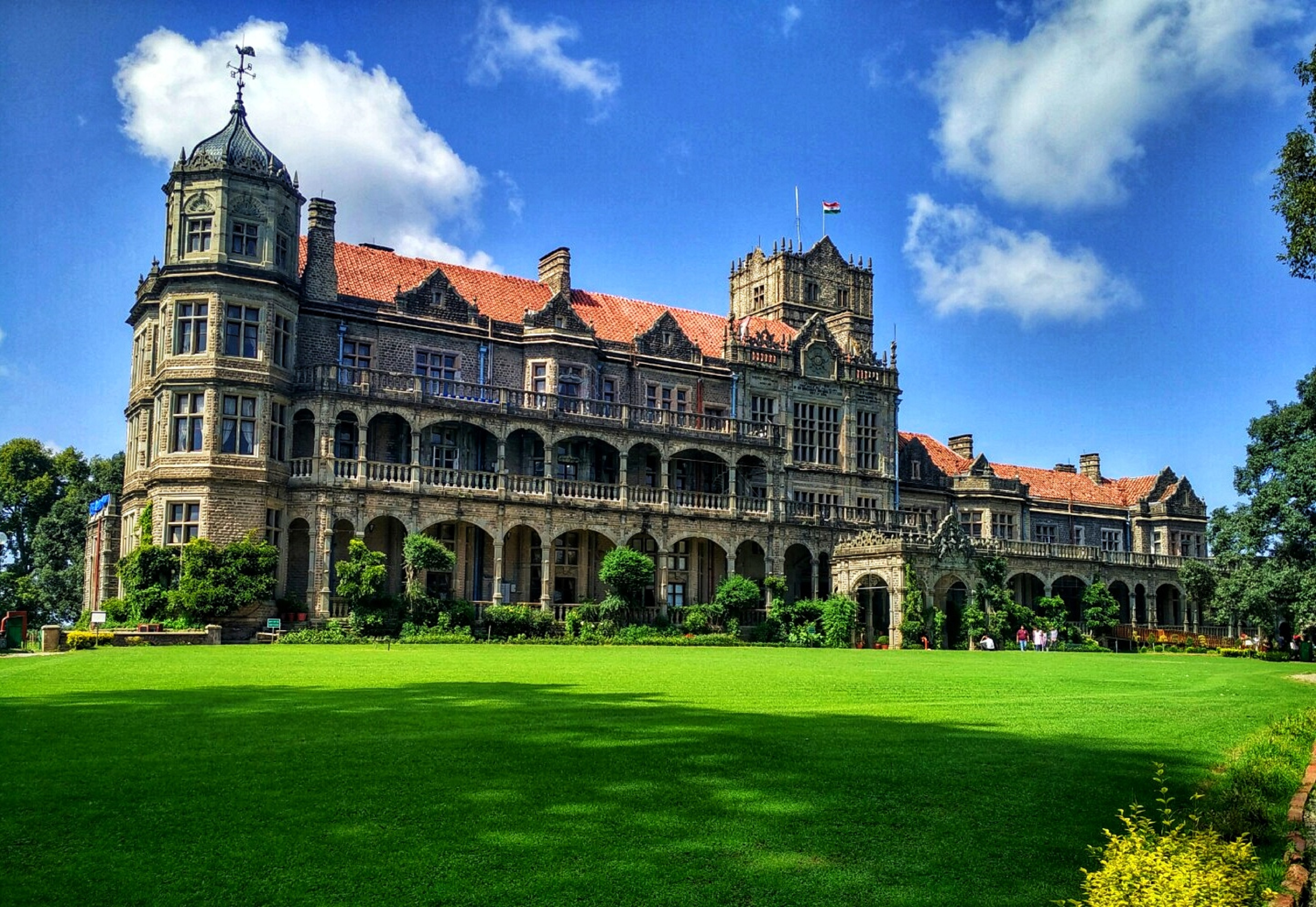
Viceregal Lodge (Rashtrapati Niwas)

One of the most important landmarks near Boileauganj is Viceregal Lodge (Rashtrapati Niwas), this is among the most famous colonial buildings in India. Built in the Jacobethan and Scottish-baronial style during the British era, it served as the residence of the Viceroy of India. Historically significant events linked with the building and surrounding region include high level British administrative meetings, discussions before Partition and the 1945 Simla Conference. Today the building houses Indian Institute of Advanced Studies, it is one of India’s premier research institutes in humanities and social sciences.

=== Transportation importance ===
Boileauganj is an important traffic junction in Shimla’s western road network. The area connects central Shimla, Totu, and Summer Hill in Shimla as well as it is important point for connection of Shimla with other cities of the state like Bilaspur, Mandi, Hamirpur, and Dharamshala because as it is situated alongside NH 5 and NH 205.

=== Religious importance ===
The locality is home to numerous Hindu temples but the most notable is Kamna Devi Temple, located atop of Prospect Hill from Boileauganj main intersection. Apart from temples there is a Gurudwara named Gurudwara Guru Singh Sabha and a mosque too.

== Modern issues ==
Current urban challenges in Boileauganj include traffic congestion, slope instability, parking shortages and especially landslide risks as happened back in 2023 monsoon when on the fateful day of August 14, major landslide occurred from IIAS lawn to Shiv Bavdi temple at 7 AM, when people were worshipping there and 20 people lost their lives in a sudden landslide.
