= Glen, Shimla =

Forest in Shimla, Himachal Pradesh, India

Glen Forest
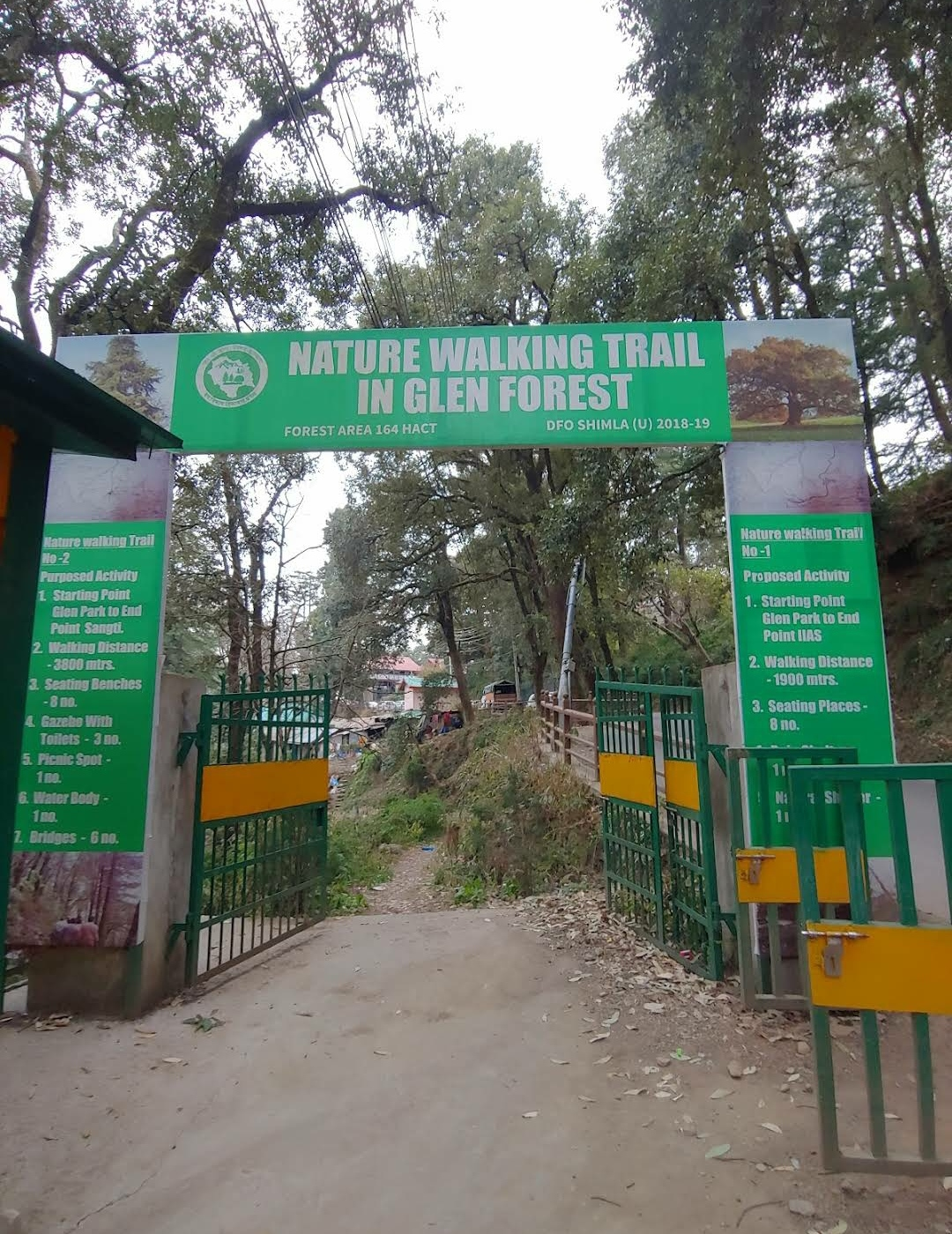
- Entrance Gate of Glen Nature Trail from Boileuganj near IIAS

Geography
- Location: Annadale Road, Chaura Maidan, Shimla, Himachal Pradesh, India

Administration
- Administered by: Divisional Forest Officer, Shimla

Ecology
- Forest cover: 164 Hectares
- Fauna: Antelopes, Grey Junglefowl

Glen is a forest area situated between Annadale, Summer Hill, Chaura Maidan and Boileauganj in Shimla city in the North Indian state of Himachal Pradesh. Glen is known for its natural scenic views and its nature trails.

== Geography ==
Glen is located below Chaura Maidan and besides Annadale, some of its part lies below the suburb of Summer Hill.

== View ==
Glen attracts a lot of tourists. It is a forest area which includes three trails and a gazebo. Below the major trails it also has a waterfall.
