= Seven Hills of Shimla =

Terrain of Shimla, India

Coordinates: 31.1041°N 77.1434°E

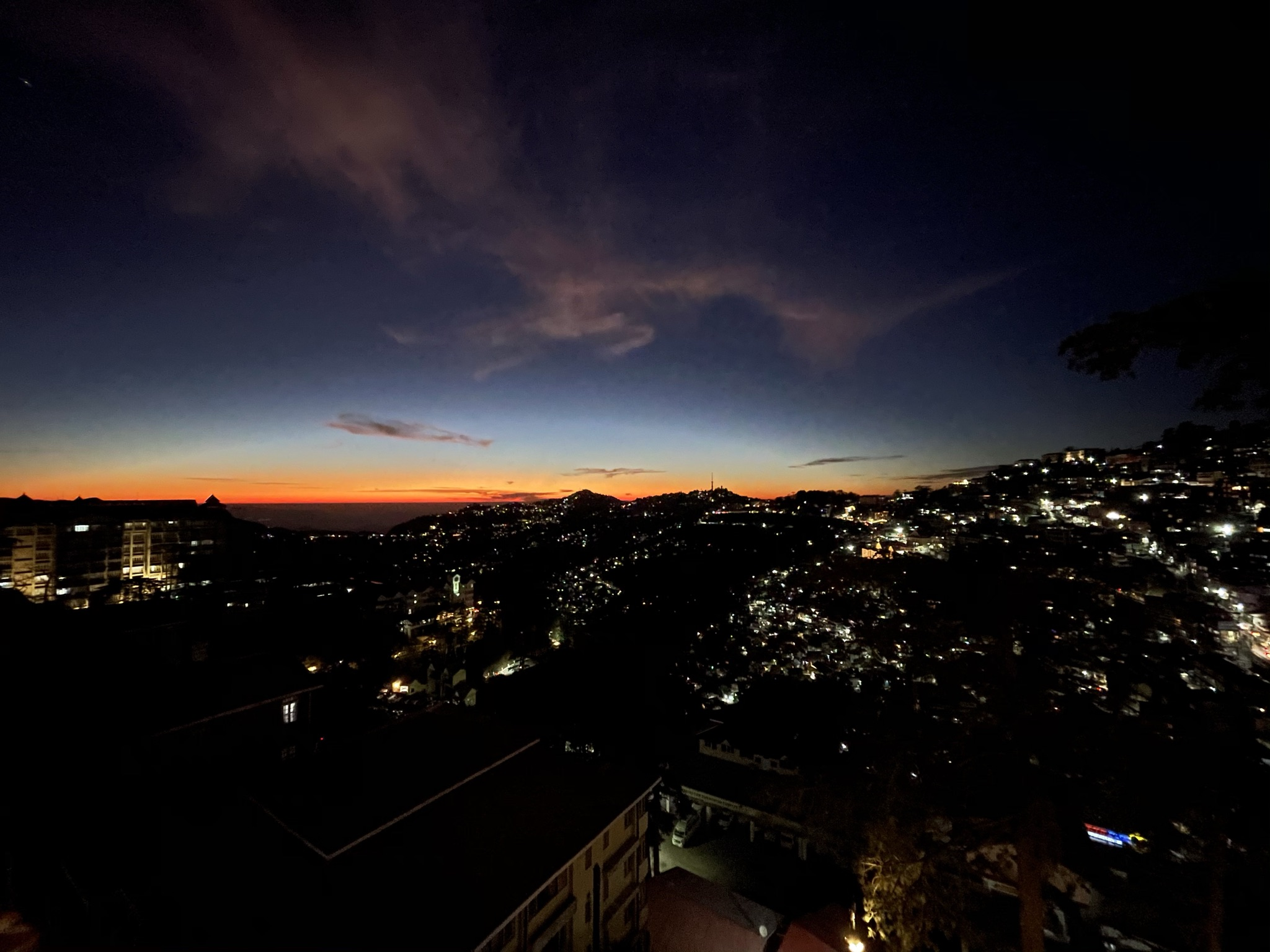
Shimla in evening

Seven Hills of Shimla are the seven hills in Shimla, the capital and the largest city of the North Indian state of Himachal Pradesh. It served as the summer capital of British India. Shimla city is developed on the Seven Hills. Although today Shimla has even spread oust the seven hills but the main city center lies on the seven hills.

== Jakhu Hill ==
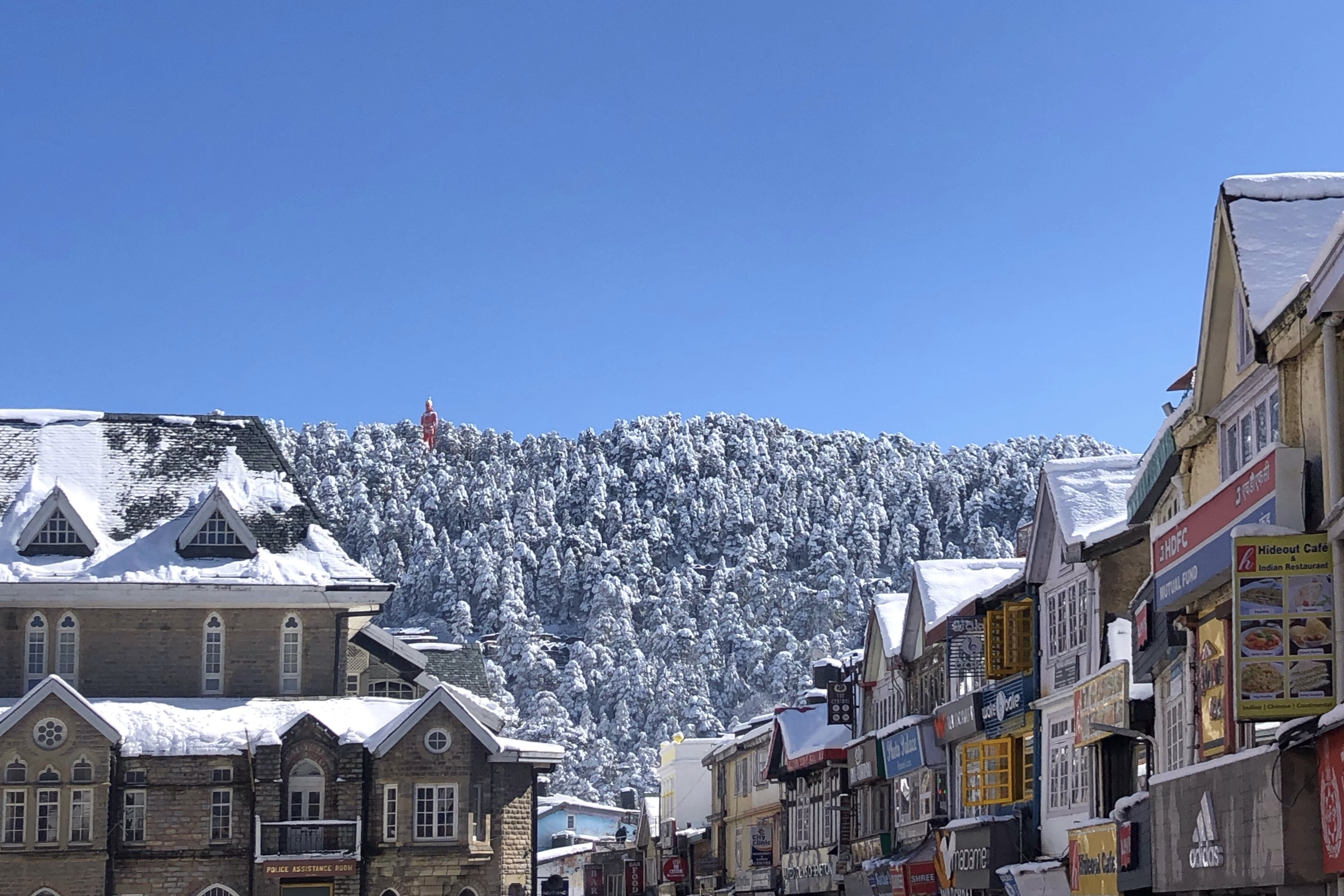
View of Jakhu hill from The Mall

Jakhu Hill is elevated at 2,471 metres (8,107 ft) is the first hill and the highest hill of Shimla. The hill is the part of the central Shimla and is crowned by the temple dedicated to Lord Hanuman Jakhu Temple and a statue in its premises i.e. Shri Hanuman Jakhu. The hill is secured with Deodar and Alpine trees.

== Elysium Hill ==
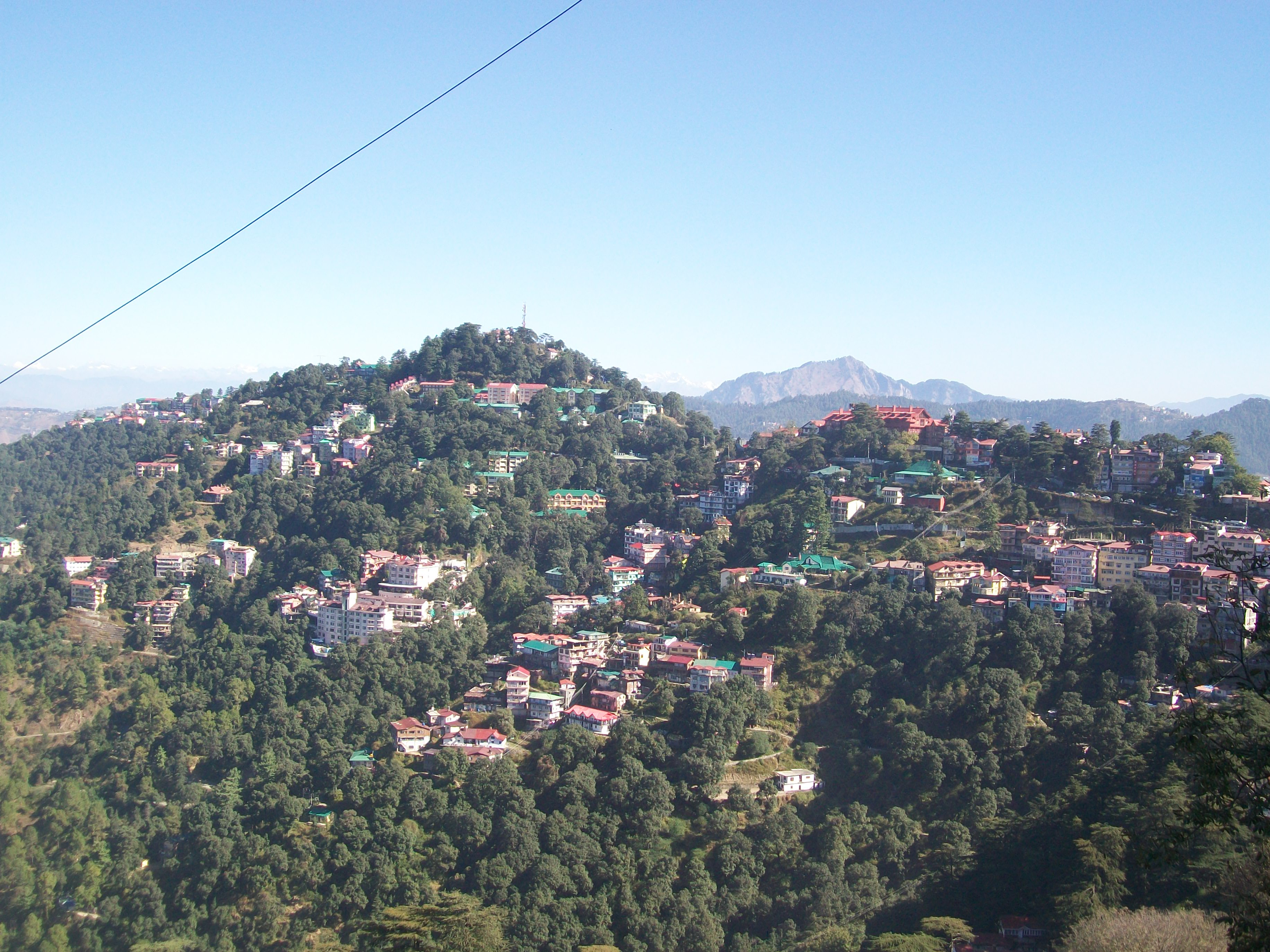
Longwood locality situated over Elysium Hill

Elysium Hill is elevated at 2,274.68 metres (7,462.9 ft) holds the north-western Shimla. It holds Auckland House School and Longwood and reaches out towards the Bharari. This appealing site is situated out and about promoting the Lakkar Bazaar. The Auckland House, which was the home of Lord Baron Auckland (now school) is situated here. As indicated by records, Lord Auckland bought this house in the year 1836, and it was changed over to a school, Auckland House School. Stirling Castle, found close by, is a halfway house which offers a refuge for poor Tibetan children. One of the major neighbourhoods of Shimla, Kaithu's half region of Buchail area is located in the southern part of the hill, other half and main part of the suburb is located on the southern part of Bantony Hill.

== Bantony Hill ==
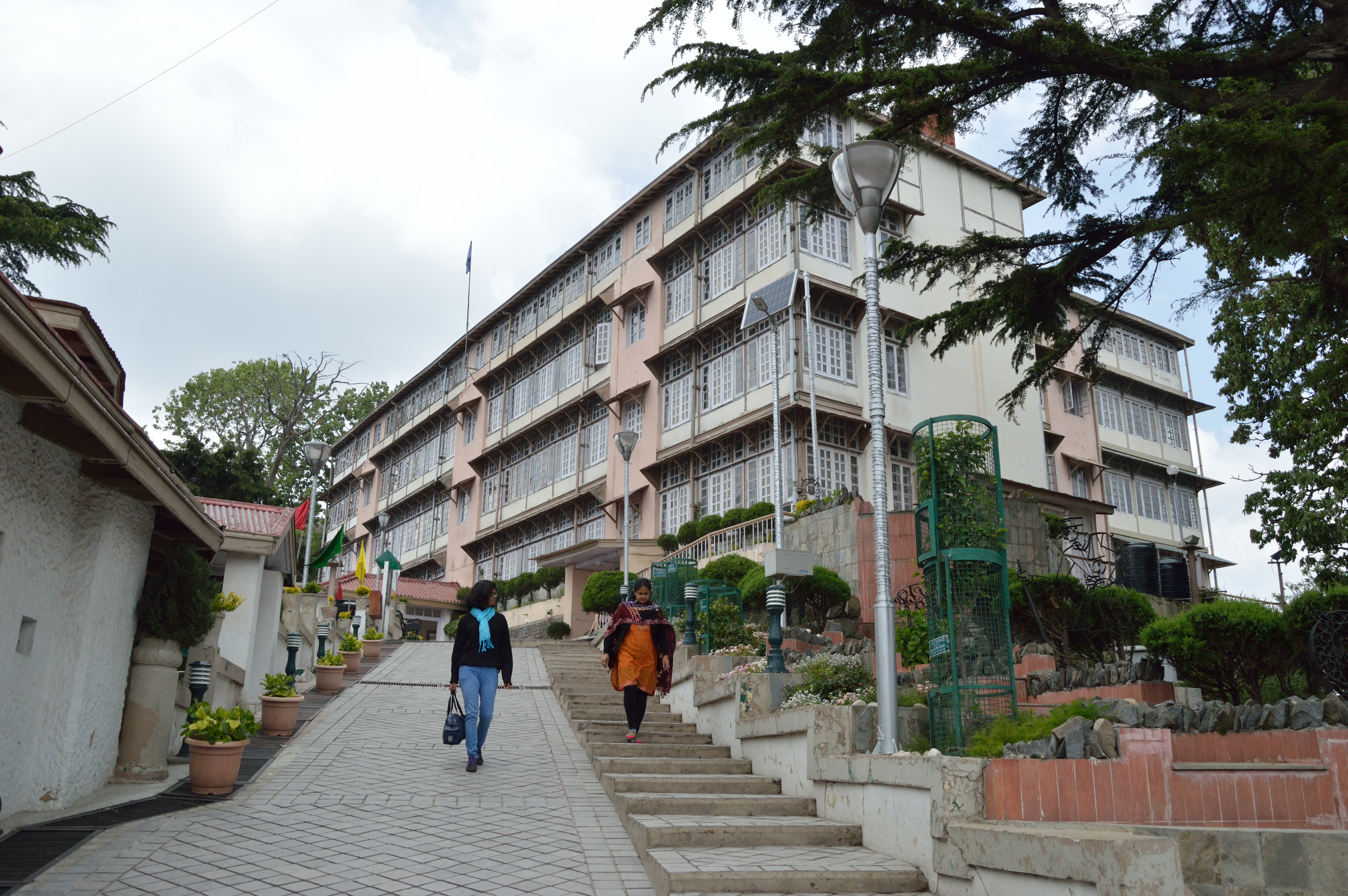
Grand Hotel atop of Bantony Hill

Bantony Hill is elevated at 2,226 metres (7,303 ft) holds the central Shimla. Kali Bari Temple, Grand Hotel and Bantony Castle are the three major landmarks located on the top of it. The hill is named after Lord Bantony and his castle situated over it. Two of the most important neighbourhoods of Shimla which are Kaithu and Annadale, are located on the southern part of the hill.

== Prospect Hill ==
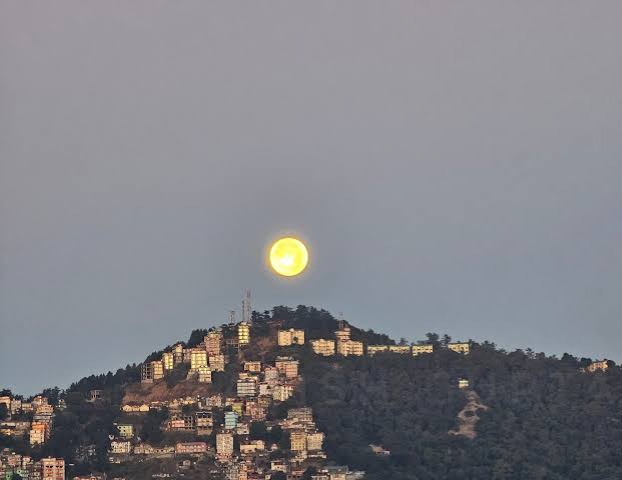
View of moon exactly over Prospect Hill

Prospect Hill is elevated at 2,178.92 metres (7,148.7 ft), is located in the western Shimla atop of Boileauganj. It has the Kamna Devi Temple on the top of it. The slope is a valued place for in Shimla, as it is mainstream for having an exceptionally celebrated sanctuary committed to Goddess Kamna Devi.

== Inverarm Hill ==
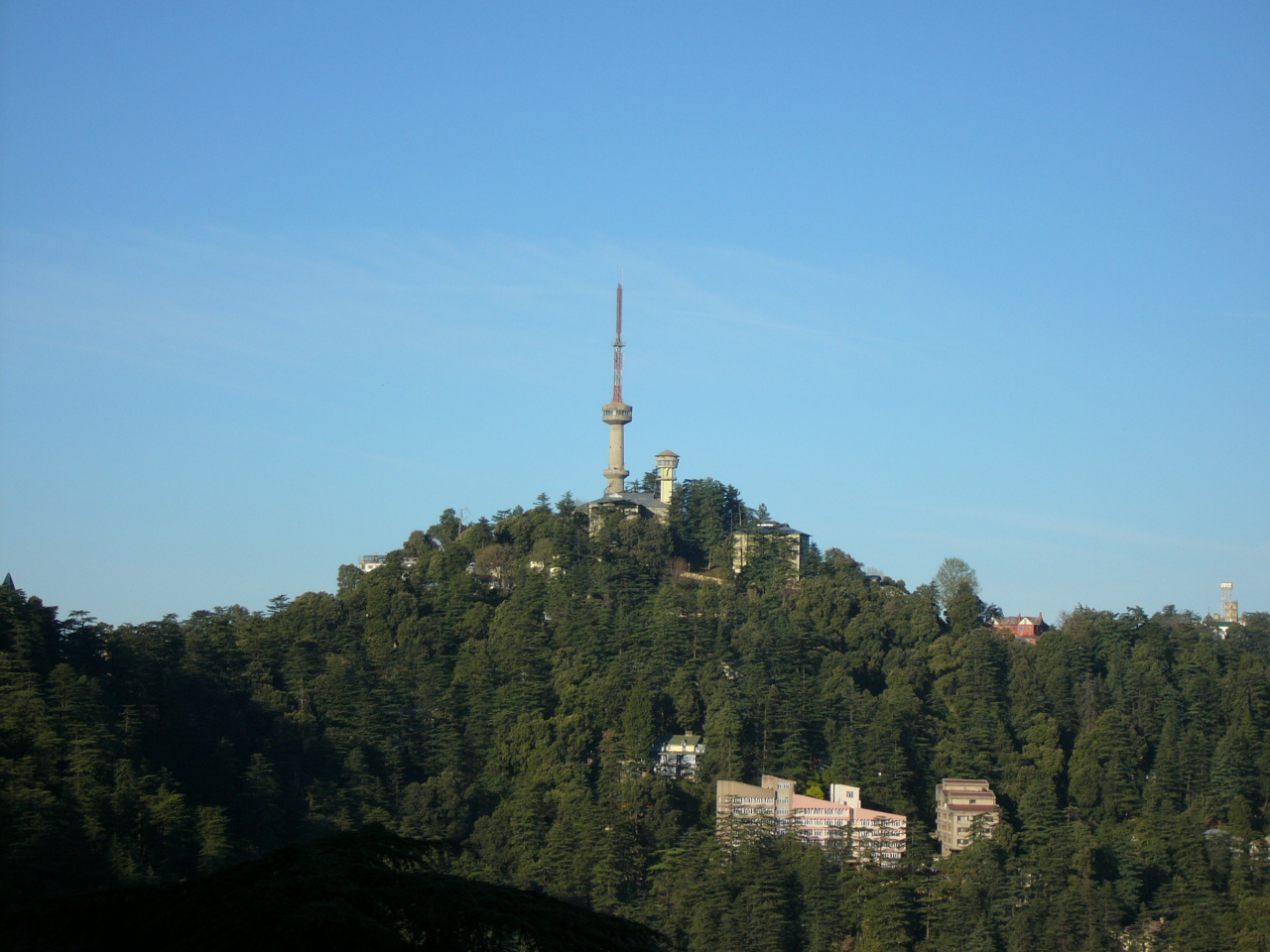
View of TV Tower besides Himachal State Museum atop Inverarm Hill

Inverarm Hill is elevated at 2,178.77 metres (7,148.2 ft) holds one of the most important parts of the city. On the top of it Chaura Maidan area where Himachal State Museum and Bird Museum is located. Glen forest is located in the bottom part of the hill, which covers half of the areas near Annadale, which is one of the main neighbourhoods of Shimla.

== Observatory Hill ==
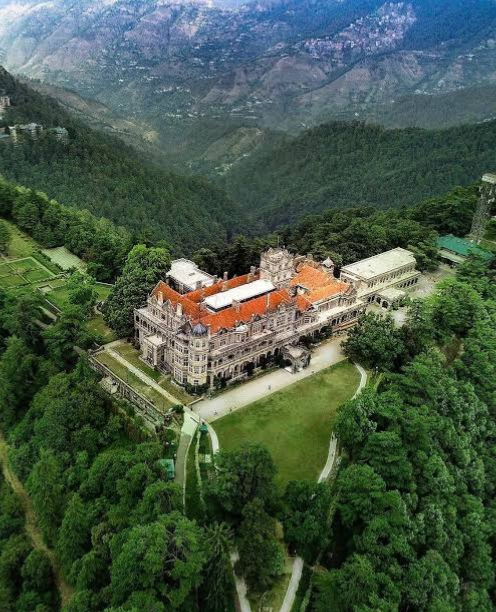
Views of Indian Institute of Advanced Study located on the top of Observatory Hill

Observatory Hill is elevated at 2,178.41 metres (7,147.0 ft) also holds the western Shimla. On the top of it Indian Institute of Advanced Study is located. The Hill is atop of Boileauganj and Chaura Maidan localities of the city. The working in which the foundation is set up is a noteworthy royal residence that was worked by Lord Dufferin, who was the Viceroy of India from 1884– 1888. Erstwhile called the Viceregal Lodge is today the Rashtrapati Niwas and in addition the Institute of Advanced Studies. Most parts of the establishment are shut for an open public, anyway whatever is left of the immaculate structure is open and drives in a major number of sightseers to the place.

== Summer Hill ==
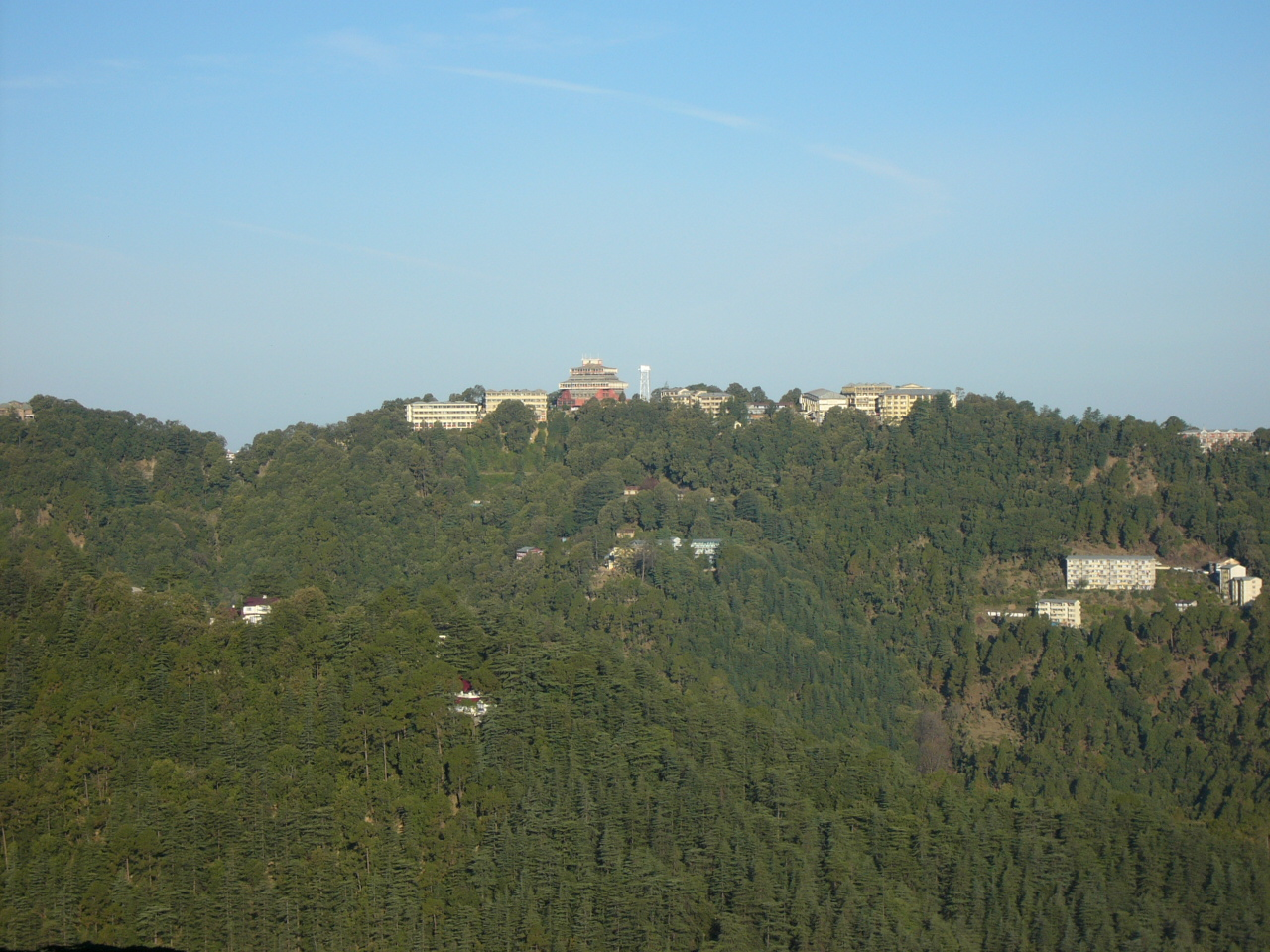
View of Summer Hill with Himachal Pradesh University situated over it

Summer Hill is elevated at 2,128.89 metres (6,984.5 ft), it holds the western Shimla. It is the least highest hill of the seven hills of Shimla. On the top of it the campus of the Himachal Pradesh University is located. Summer Hill is a pleasant spot on Kalka-Shimla railroad line that offers stunning perspectives of the snowy mountains. Summer Hill is a similar place where Mahatma Gandhi had visited and remained at the exquisite Georgian House of Rajkumari Amrit Kaur.

== See also ==
- List of cities claimed to be built on seven hills
- Seven Hills, Queensland
- Seven hills (disambiguation)
