= Jutogh =

Neighbourhood and Cantonment Board in Shimla, Himachal Pradesh, India

- Cantonment Board; Neighbourhood
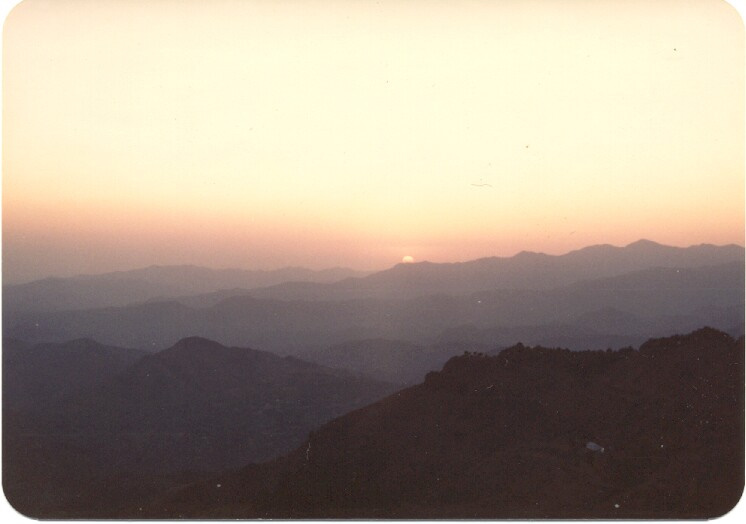
- Jutogh sunset

- Location in Himachal Pradesh, India Jutogh (India)
- Coordinates: 31.1°N 77.12°E
- Country: India
- State: Himachal Pradesh
- District: Shimla
- Elevation: 1,729 m (5,673 ft)

Population (2001)
  - Total: 2,417

Languages
  - Official: Hindi
- Time zone: UTC+5:30 (IST)

Jutogh is a part of Shimla and it is a cantonment board, in the North Indian state of Himachal Pradesh.

The Jutogh cantonment was established in 1843 Cantonment Board. Jutogh is a statutory body constituted under the Cantonments Act, 2006. The emergence of the Cantonment Board as a municipal body in cantonments was basically in response to the need for maintenance of proper sanitation, health and hygiene in these areas.

The scope of the Cantonment Board functions extends to the entire gamut of municipal administration. In addition to providing basic amenities, Cantonment Board, Jutogh also manages public welfare institutions and facilities to the residents of the cantonment area.

Jutogh was acquired by the British Government in 1843. It was first occupied by a regiment of Gurkhas, and was afterwards made over to the Governors of the Bishop Cotton School, but, being found unsuitable for this purpose, was for a time abandoned.

Two batteries of British Mountain Artillery and two companies of British Infantry were stationed here during the summer months.

== Geography ==
Jutogh is located at 31.1°N 77.12°E near Totu, an important suburb of Shimla city. It has an average elevation of 1729 metres (5673 feet), a total green area of 112.62 Acres, and a public garden known as Cantt. Board Public Garden.

== Demographics ==
As of 2001 India census, Jutogh had a population of 2417. Males constitute 68% of the population and females 32%. Jutogh has an average literacy rate of 85%, higher than the national average of 59.5%: male literacy is 90%, and female literacy is 75%. In Jutogh, 10% of the population is under 6 years of age.
