= Totu, Shimla =

Totu
- Neighbourhood
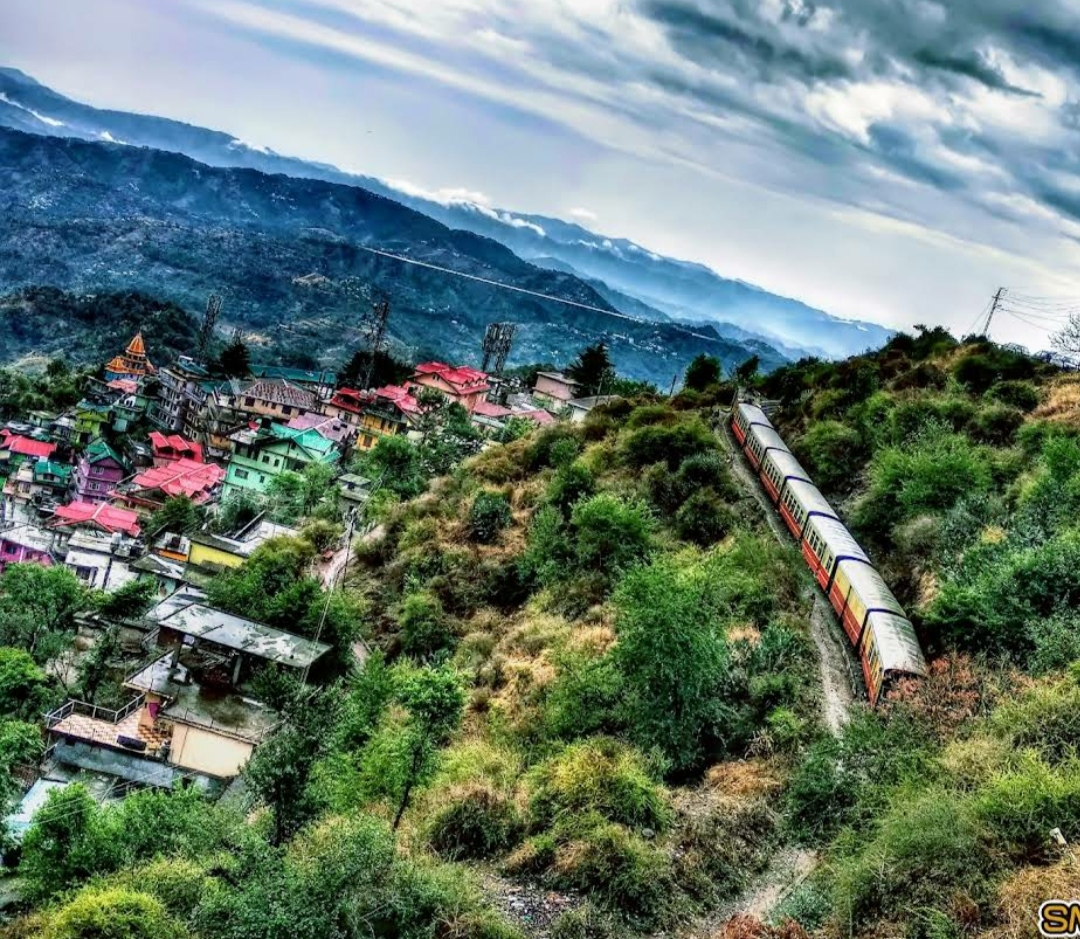
- Totu suburb view from uphill with a passing train
- Location of Totu in Shimla
- Coordinates: 31.099167°N 77.128889°E
- Country: India
- State: Himachal Pradesh
- District: Shimla
- PIN: 171011

Totu is a part of Shimla city, in the state of Himachal Pradesh, India. It is a populous urban area of the city. under the administration of the Shimla Municipal Corporation.

== Etymology ==
Totu is named after Gian Chand Totu, a freedom fighter of India born on 15th September 1919. He was the representative of Himalayan Regional Council and a participant of Quit India Movement.

== Geography ==
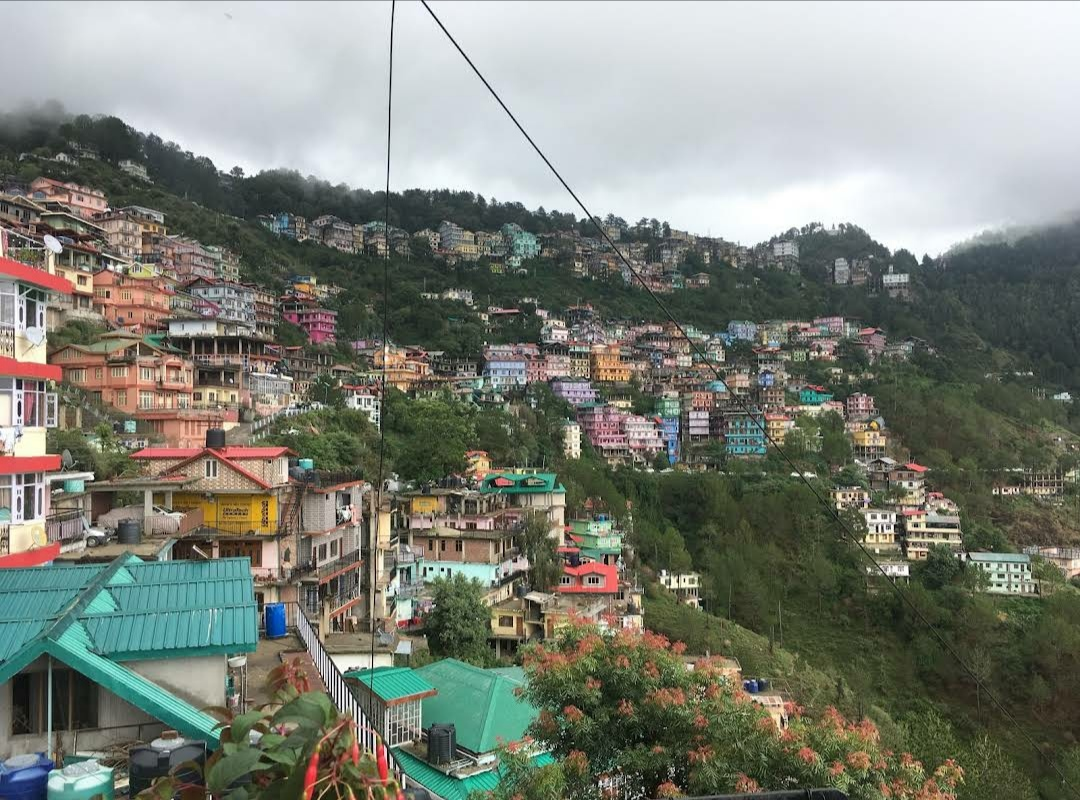
Totu view from Jutogh Railway Station

It is located around 7 km from Shimla Old Bus Stand & lies on NH-88 on Shimla-Mandi highway. The average elevation of the region is 1950m above sea level. The climate is usually cold, summers are moderate with temperature rising up to 31 degree Celsius. Totu receives heavy rains during monsoons and is one of the two places besides Jakhoo, known for being the foggiest places in Shimla during monsoons. It also receives moderate to heavy snowfall in the winter. Totu is divided into five areas namely Market area, Vijaynagar, Shivnagar, Divyanagar, Majiat and Majthai.

== Other details ==
It houses the Jutogh railway station of the Kalka Shimla Railway and is also home to Himachal Pradesh State Co-operative Marketing & Consumers Federation Ltd., a department of the Himachal Pradesh Government. Shimla Airport located at Jubberhatti is approximately 14 km from this place. HP Institute of Management Studies, affiliated to Himachal Pradesh University is also located here. A rapidly growing consumer market that caters for the needs of the locals forms the heart of the town. The Pin code of Totu is 171011.

Totu has four banks; Punjab National Bank, Himachal Pradesh State Co-operative Bank, State Bank of India and recently opened HDFC Bank. ATMs of all four banks have been operational for many years. You can also find newly opened ICICI ATM here. Market has a variety of shops which provide daily household items. A private community hall is also situated in the town. It has two private schools and one government senior secondary school. Besides these urbanizing institutions, it has three main temples; Laxmi Narayan Temple, Shiv Temple and Shiv Shakti Temple near Government School, for religious activities.
