= Rashtrapati Niwas =

Former residence of the British Viceroy of India in Shimla, Himachal Pradesh

Coordinates: 31.103730°N 77.141887°E

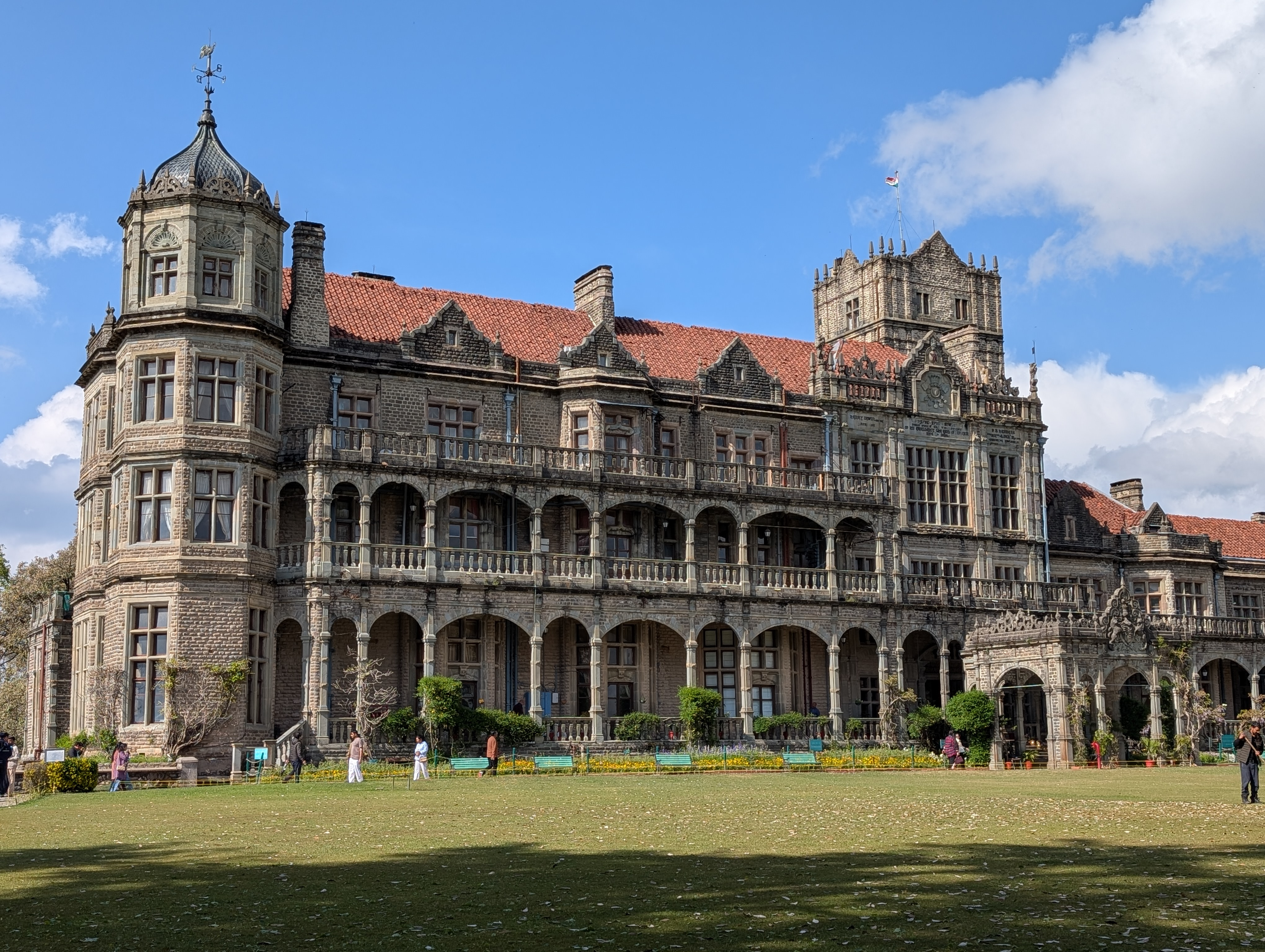
- Interactive map of the Rashtrapati Niwas area
- Former names: Viceregal Lodge

General information
- Architectural style: Jacobethan
- Location: Observatory Hill, Boileauganj, Shimla, Himachal Pradesh, India
- Current tenants: Indian Institute of Advanced Study
- Groundbreaking: 1880
- Completed: 1888
- Owner: Ministry of Education

Design and construction
- Architect: Henry Irwin

The Rashtrapati Niwas (literally the "President's Residence"), formerly known as Viceregal Lodge, is located on the Observatory Hill in Boileauganj, Shimla, Himachal Pradesh, India. It was formerly the residence of the British Viceroy of India. Its original furnishings go back to the British rule in India and the IIAS library it now contains has a vast collection.

The Viceregal Lodge was designed by British architect Henry Irwin and built in the Jacobethan style during Lord Dufferin’s tenure as Viceroy. Its construction started in 1880 and was completed in 1888. Lord Dufferin occupied the lodge on 23 July 1888. The final cost of project was around 38 lakh (3,800,000) rupees with the annual upkeep cost being around 1.5 lakh (150,000) rupees in the 1880s. At that time the estate stood on an area of 331 acres (134 ha), but today is reduced to 110 acres (45 ha). The structure draws inspiration from the architectural style of the English Renaissance, and also reflects elements of the castles of the Scottish Highlands. The building is of light blue-grey stone masonry with tiled pitch roofing. The interior of the main building is noted for elaborate woodwork which has stood the test of time. Teak was brought from Burma, and was supplemented by local cedar wood and walnut.

== History ==
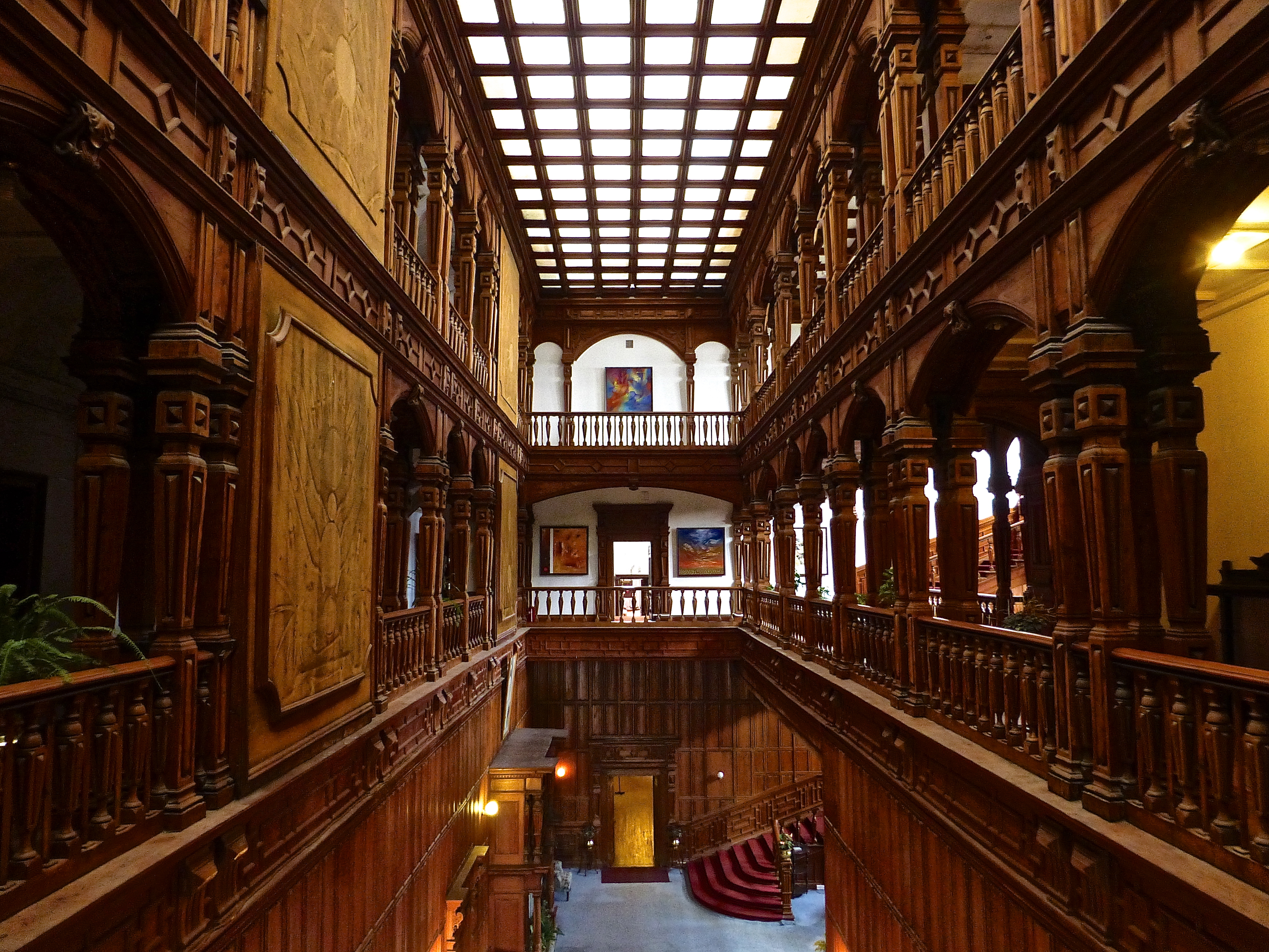
The interior hallway of Viceregal Lodge

The Simla Conference convened by Lord Wavell in 1945 to approve the Wavell Plan for Indian Self Government was hosted at this estate. The summer capital of India was of little use to the President of India who visited it only for a few days in the year, if at all. Professor S. Radhakrishnan thought of putting it to academic use. The Rashtrapati Niwas Estate was transferred to the Ministry of Education to be handed over to the Indian Institute of Advanced Study. The C.P.W.D., the Himachal Pradesh High Court, and the Himachal Pradesh University were allowed in due course to use some of its buildings but the bulk of the Estate, including its well kept lawns and rich greenhouse, has remained in use for the Indian Institute of Advanced Study.

== See also ==
- List of official residences of India
- Government Houses of India
- Government Houses of the British Empire
