= Kamna Devi Temple =

- कामना देवी मँदिर
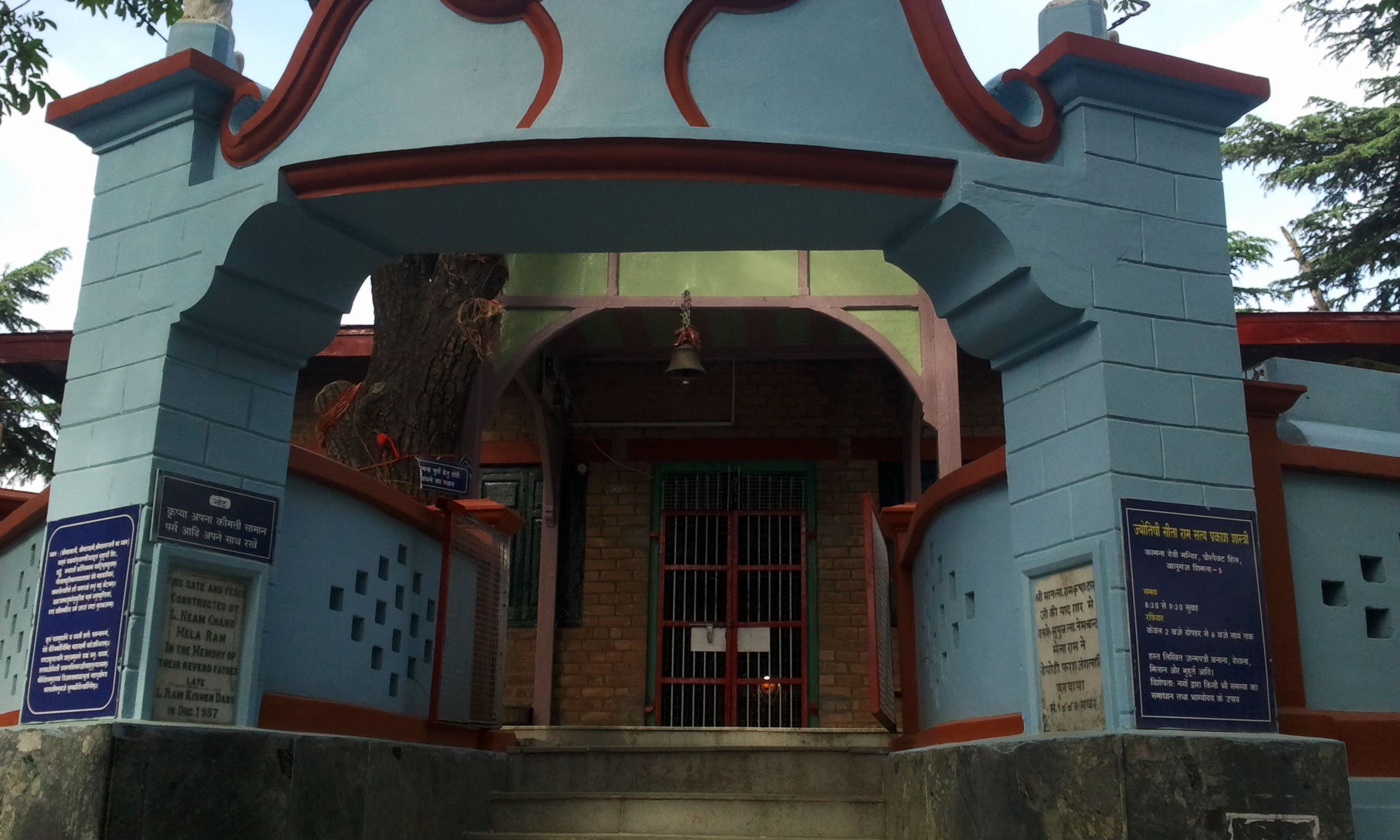
- Kamna Devi Temple

- Location in Himachal Pradesh Kamna Devi Temple (India)

Religion
- Affiliation: Hinduism
- District: Shimla
- Deity: Kamna Devi
- Festival: Navratri

Location
- Location: Prospect Hill, Boileauganj, Shimla
- State: Himachal Pradesh
- Country: India
- Interactive map of Kamna Devi Temple
- Coordinates: 31°05′46″N 77°08′03″E

Architecture
- Creator: Rana of Junga

Specifications
- Elevation: 2,176 m (7,139 ft)

Kamna Devi Temple is a Hindu temple located in Boileauganj, Shimla, Himachal Pradesh. It is situated atop of Prospect Hill which is one of the seven hills in Shimla. The temple is situated on steep road to hilltop above Boileauganj.

== History ==
The temple was built by Rana of Junga in 18th century. The exact date of the establishment of the temple is not known. The temple is built in the local hill architectural style though not proper in Kath Kuni or Pagoda style as other temples of Himachal Pradesh.

== Belief ==
The temple is considered to be one of the most prominent in Shimla. Pilgrims usually pray here for the blessings and for resolutions of their problems, especially regarding family or marriage. Pilgrims come here from all parts of the country to seek blessings of the goddess.

== Geography ==
The temple is situated at the hill top of the Prospect Hill which is one of the seven hills of Shimla. The temple is situated between Deodar, Pine, Oak and Rhododendron trees. It is located in serene environment. The temple provides scenic views of southern Shimla including Tara Devi Temple.

== Accessibility ==
As the temple is located inside the city, the accessibility is comparatively easy as to the other temples which are outside the city. One can reach here by bus to Boileauganj and then by foot or by private vehicle or taxi to the top to the temple. Buses to Boileauganj can be taken by the Old Bus Stand or by other bus stops of Shimla or by train then bus or taxi can be taken from outside the Shimla railway station gate.
