= Simla Conference =

1945 meeting convened to formulate the Wavellite Plan in British India

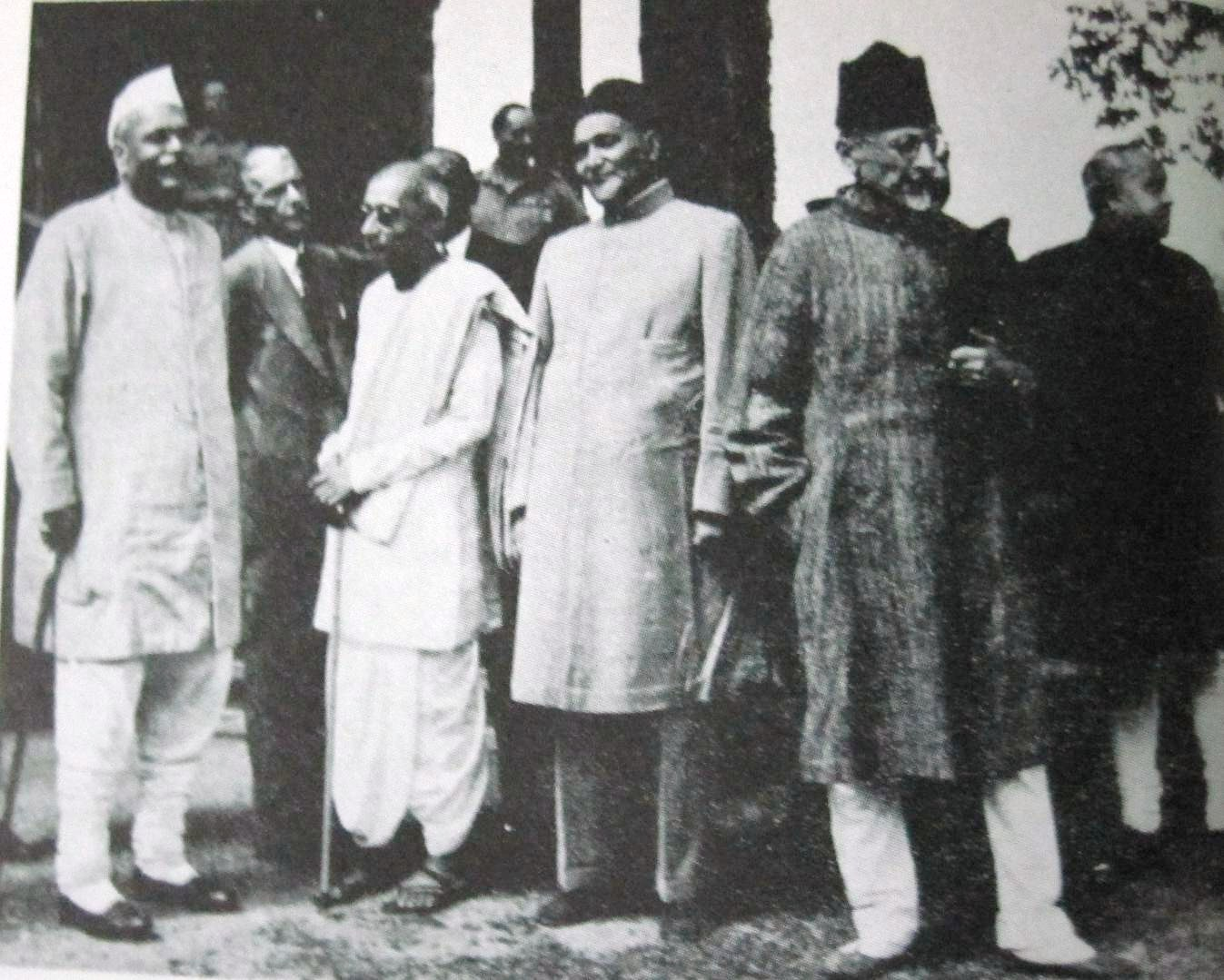
At the Conference: Rajendra Prasad, Jinnah, C. Rajagopalachari and Maulana Azad

Simla Conference 1945

The Simla Conference was a meeting between Lord Wavell, the viceroy of India, and the major political leaders of British India at the Viceregal Lodge in June 1945 in Simla. When it was clear that British intended to leave India, they desperately needed an agreement on what should happen when they leave.

== Failure of Talks Over Muslim Representation ==
Talks stalled on the issue of the selection of Muslim representatives. The All-India Muslim League claimed to be the sole representative of Indian Muslims, and refused to back any plan in which the Indian National Congress, the dominant party in the talks, appointed Muslim representatives. This scuttled the conference, and perhaps the last viable opportunity for a united, independent India. When the Indian National Congress and the All India Muslim League reconvened under the Cabinet Mission the next year, the Indian National Congress was far less sympathetic to the Muslim League's requests despite Jinnah's approval of the British plan.

On 14 June 1945 Lord Wavell announced a plan for a new Executive Council in which all members except the Viceroy and the Commander in Chief would be Indians. This executive council was to be a temporary measure until a new permanent constitution could be agreed upon and come into force. All portfolios except Defense would be held by Indian members.

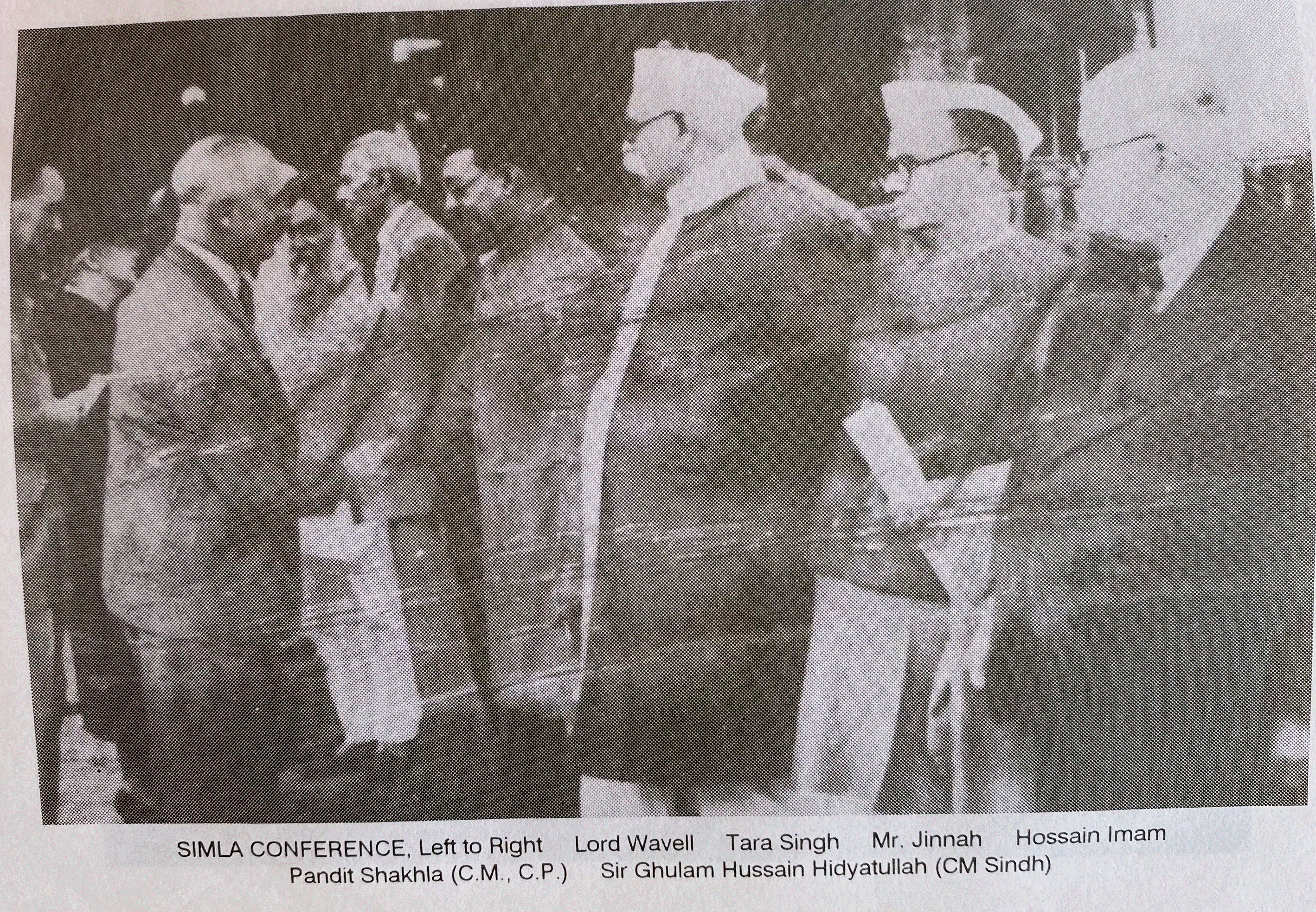
Simla Conference: Left to Right: Lord Wavell (Viceroy of India), Tara Singh, Mr Jinnah, Hussain Imam, Pandit Shukla (CM C.P.), Sir Ghulam Hussain Hidayatullah (CM Sindh)

== Lord Wavell ==
Prime Minister Winston Churchill as head of the war cabinet proposed Field Marshal Wavell's name to his cabinet in mid-June 1943, as India's next Viceroy. General Sir Claude Auchinleck who had followed Wavell in his Middle Eastern command was to be the next Commander in Chief of the Indian army after Lord Wavell.[] In October 1943 the British Government decided to replace Lord Linlithgow with Lord Wavell as the Viceroy of India. Before assuming the vice royalty, Lord Wavell had been head of the Indian army and thus had an understanding of the Indian situation. On becoming Viceroy, Wavell's most important task was to present a formula for the future government of India which would be acceptable to both the Indian National Congress and the All-India Muslim League.

== Background ==
=== Gandhi’s 1943 Fast and Imprisonment ===
Gandhi launched the Quit India Movement on 8th August 1942, after which he was arrested with other Congress lieutenants like Javaharlal Nehru and sardar Vallabh Bhai Patel. He was held separately in the Agha Khan's Pune palace while others were kept in the Ahmednagar Fort. Now he decided to launch his ''Satyagraha'', he commenced after the early morning breakfast on 10 February 1943 a fast for 21 days. Weighing 109 pounds when he began, Gandhi lost eighteen pounds after his 22-day fast. Fearing the death of Gandhi in prison as before him Kasturba, his wife and Mahadev Desai, his private secretary died in the same prison in Pune Palace, Lord Linlithgow recommended to Churchill the immediate unconditional release of Gandhi. Churchill wrote back to Linlithgow, "it seems almost certain that the old rascal [Gandhi] will emerge all better for his so-called fast.'' Gandhi broke his fast on 3 March 1943. Gandhi suffered from malaria, and after that his health seriously deteriorated. The new Viceroy Archibald Wavell, recommended his unconditional release, Leo Amery the secretary of state for India convinced Churchill to release Gandhi on medical grounds, so he was released. After his release, Gandhi managed to recover. Upon hearing of this Churchill is said to have sent Wavell a peevish telegram asking ''why Gandhi has not died yet?''

=== Communal Division and the Road to the Simla Conference ===
Communal division was the greatest hurdle in the path of any political progress in India, so Wavell also began to agree with Amery's conviction that until the "Aged Trinity" (Gandhi, Churchill and Jinnah) continued to lead there was little chance of any political advance. Lord Wavell had a plan in mind and was eager to invite key leaders to a summit, but he was waiting for something to come out of the Gandhi-Jinnah meetings rescheduled on 9 September. C. Rajagopalachari presented a formula before that meeting accepting the Muslim right for a separate homeland. The talks began on 9 September 1944 at Jinnah's residence in Malabar Hill, Bombay where both leaders spent three and a half hours of secret discussion but Gandhi later with C. R. called it a "test of my patience and nothing else and I am amazed at my own patience". Their second meeting proved no more fruitful than the first, Jinnah sensed by this time the futility of the talks. Then there was a session of written correspondence on 11, 12, 13 and 14 September, and on 24, 25 and 26 September 1944, but nothing came out of it. Gandhi by now believed that "Jinnah was a good person but he suffers hallucination when he imagines the unnatural division of India and creation of Pakistan". Wavell wired to Amery: "Gandhi wants independence first and then is willing to resolve communal problem afterwards as he is profoundly a Hindu and wants transfer of full power to some nebulous national, while Jinnah wants to settle the communal problem first and then wants independence as he has lost his trust in Congress and Hindus." Wavell viewed this mini-summit breakdown as a personal challenge to bring together the two parties. He had plans in mind and was willing to use his influence and power to settle the communal deadlock. He would try to bring some moderate Indian leaders to a settlement by calling them to Simla (India's summer capital). His list included as he told to Amery, "Gandhi and one "other" of the Congress party, Jinnah and one other member of the Muslim League, Dr. Ambedkar to represent the "Depressed classes", Tara Singh to represent the Sikhs, M. N. Roy for labor representation, and some other to represent Non-Congress and Non-League Hindus and Muslims.

=== Wavell’s Final Push Before the Simla Conference ===
After correspondence with Amery in October, Wavell decided to write to Churchill directly and he tried to convince Churchill in this regard though he was sure that Churchill was reluctant to hold or attend any summit as "he hated India and anything to do with it". Churchill informed Amery that he would not be able to see Wavell until March 1945, Wavell on his own behalf met with Jinnah on 6 December, and tried to convince him to live in a united India as that would be much more beneficial for all because it would be a stronger nation at an international level. Jinnah argued that "Indian unity was only a British creation". Bengal's governor Richard Casey was well informed about Congress-League relations and he wrote to Wavell saying: "Congress is basically responsible for the growth of the Pakistan idea, by the way they treated the Muslims especially by refusing to allow them into the coalition provincial governments." Wavell agreed with everything Casey said about Pakistan, writing in his reply: "I do not believe that Pakistan will work." Churchill chaired his war cabinet that reviewed and rejected Wavell's proposal for constitutional reforms in India on 18 December. But Wavell was invited to visit England, and met with Churchill and Cabinet in May 1945. Wavell was allowed to fly back to India in June 1945 to release Congress Working Committee members and start the talks that would later be called the Simla Conference. Wavell decided to call all key leaders of India in Simla on 25 June 1945 and broadcast a message to all Indians on 14 June 1945 showing British willingness to give India dominion status as soon as possible if the communal deadlock was broken down. "India needs a surgical operation", Nehru noted after considering Wavell's idea, "We have to get rid of our preoccupation with a petty problem" as he considered the demand for Pakistan a petty problem. Jinnah accepted the invitation but only if he could meet with Wavell alone first on 24 June.

== Details ==
One day before the conference was convened on 24 June, Wavell met with Abul Kalam Azad, Gandhi and Jinnah to assess their approach. He noted in his diary, "Gandhi & Jinnah are behaving like very temperamental prima donnas". Lord Wavell officially opened the summit at 11:00 am on 25 June 1945. In the beginning Azad being president of Congress spoke of its "non-communal" character. Jinnah responded to this by speaking of Congress' predominantly Hindu character and at that point there was a tug of war which had to be quieted down by Wavell. On the morning of 29 June the conference was reconvened and Wavell asked parties to submit a list of candidates for his new council, Azad agreed while Jinnah refused to submit a list before consulting the Muslim League's working committee. The conference was adjourned till 14 July, meanwhile Wavell met with Jinnah on 8 July and tried to convince him as Jinnah was determined to nominate all the proposed Muslim members from the Muslim League as he considered the Congress' Muslim representatives to be "show boys". Wavell gave him a letter that was placed in front of the Muslim League's Working Committee on 9 July. Jinnah replied after careful consideration of the Working Committee: "I regret to inform you that you have failed to give assurance relating to the nomination of all Muslim members from Muslim League's platform so we are not able to submit a list." The Viceroy was equally resolved not to give at that point and wired to Amery at that night his own list of new council members. Four were to be Muslim League members (Liaquat Ali Khan, Khawaja Nazimuddin, Chaudhry Khaliquzzaman and Eassak Sait) and another Non-League Muslim Muhammad Nawaz Khan (a Punjabi landlord). The five 'Caste Hindus' had to be Jawaharlal Nehru, Vallabhbhai Patel, Rajendra Prasad, Madhav Shrihari Aney, B. N. Rau. Tara Singh was to represent the Sikhs and B. R. Ambedkar to represent the "untouchables", John Mathai was the only Christian thus bringing the total to fourteen (14) including the Viceroy and Commander-in-Chief. Amery asked Wavell to consult this list with Jinnah, when Jinnah was asked about the Muslim names he adamantly refused to allow any League member to be part of the government until the League's right to be the sole representative of Muslims of India was acknowledged. Wavell found this demand impossible thus half an hour later he told Gandhi about his failure, Gandhi took the news calmly and said: "His Majesty King George will sooner or later have to take the Hindu or Muslim point of view as they were irreconcilable." Thus the Wavell plan that was later to be called the Simla Conference failed in its objective and set the trend for the immediate topics that would dominate discourse until Indian independence.

== Wavell Plan ==
In May 1945 Wavell visited London and discussed his ideas with the British Government. These London talks resulted in the formulation of a definite plan of action which was officially made public simultaneously on 14 June 1945 by L.S. Amery, the Secretary of State for India, in the House of Commons and by Wavell in a broadcast speech delivered from Delhi. The plan, commonly known as the Wavell Plan, proposed the following:

1. The Viceroy's Executive Council would be immediately reconstituted and the number of its members would be increased.
2. In the Council there would be equal representation of high-caste Hindus and Muslims.
3. All the members of the council, except the Viceroy and the Commander-in-Chief, would be Indians.
4. An Indian would be appointed as the member for Foreign Affairs in the Council and a British commissioner would be responsible for trade matters.
5. The defense of India would remain in British hands until power was ultimately transferred to Indians.
6. The Viceroy would convene a meeting of Indian politicians including the leaders of Congress and the Muslim League at which they would nominate members of the new Council.
7. If this plan were to be approved for the central government, then similar councils of local political leaders would be formed in all the provinces.
8. None of the changes suggested would in any way prejudice or prejudge the essential form of the future permanent Constitution of India.

To discuss these proposals with Indian leaders, Wavell summoned them to a conference in Simla on 25 June 1945.

== Criticism ==
The Wavell Plan, in essence, proposed the complete "Indianisation" of the Executive Council, but instead of asking all the parties to nominate members to the Executive Council from all the communities, seats were reserved for members on the basis of religion and caste, with the caste Hindus and Muslims being represented on it on the basis of parity. Even Mahatma Gandhi resented the use of the words "caste Hindus".

While the plan proposed immediate changes to the composition of the Executive Council it did not contain any guarantee of Indian independence, nor did it contain any mention of a future constituent assembly or any proposals for the division of power between the various parties of India.

== Failure ==
Meanwhile, a general election had been held in the United Kingdom in July 1945 which had brought the Labour Party to power. The Labour party wanted to transfer power to the Indians as quickly as possible. The new government sent the Cabinet Mission to India and this proved to be the final nail in the coffin of the Wavell Plan.
