= Kali Bari, Shimla =

Hindu temple in Shimla, India

Kali Bari Temple
- काली बाड़ी मंदिर
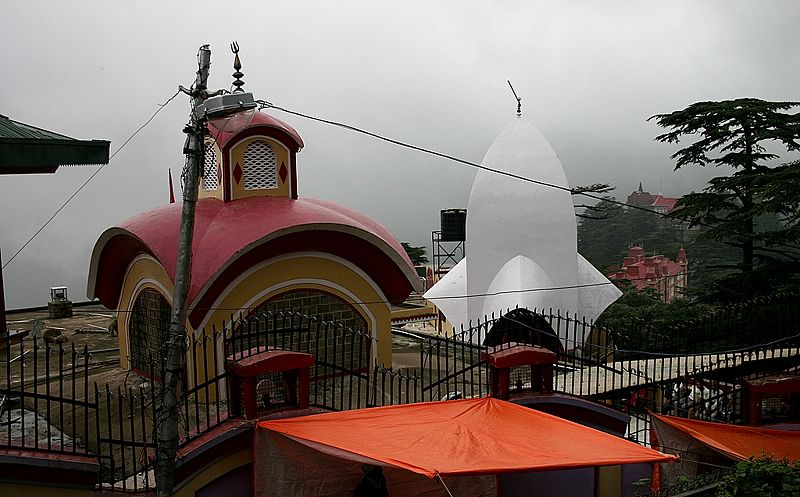
- Kali Bari temple outside uphill view

- Location of Kali Bari Temple in Himachal Pradesh

Religion
- Affiliation: Hinduism
- District: Shimla
- Deity: Kali

Location
- Location: Bantony Hill, Shimla
- State: Himachal Pradesh
- Country: India
- Coordinates: 31.105975°N 77.166813°E

Architecture
- Style: Deula
- Founder: Ram Charan Brahamchari
- Established: 1845

Kali Bari Mandir is a Hindu temple on Bantony Hill, Shimla. The temple is dedicated to an incarnation of the Hindu goddess Kali, known as Shyamala, after which the city of Shimla might have been named.

The temple was established in 1823 by the Bengali surveyors from Calcutta (capital at the time) as part of the project to make Shimla the summer capital of British India. The temple trust was formed in 1902.

== View ==
The temple is located in the city center. Shimla's Old Bus Stand, ARTRAC, Annadale, Railway Board Building, Shimla Railway Station, Shri Hanuman Jakhu can be seen from the temple premises. The temple attracts a lot of tourists and devotees.
