= Summer Hill, Shimla =

Summer Hill
- Neighbourhood
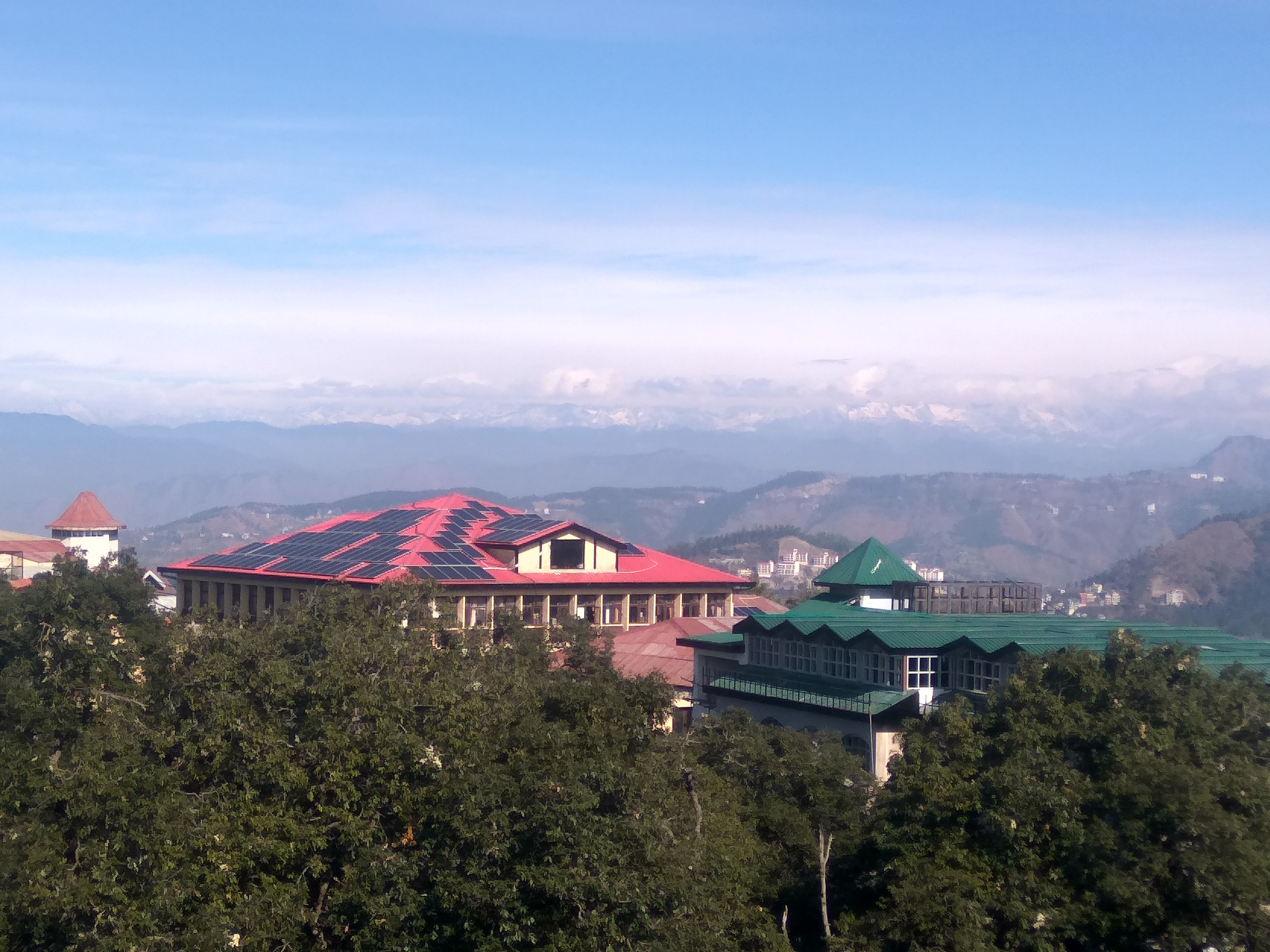
- View from Himachal Pradesh University, Summer Hill, Shimla
- Interactive map of Summer Hill
- Coordinates: 31.112°N 77.137°E
- India: India
- State: Himachal Pradesh
- City: Shimla
- Elevation: 2,123 m (6,965 ft)
- PIN: 171005

Summer Hill is a part of Shimla, the state capital of Himachal Pradesh at a height of 2,123 meters. It is on a hill, 5 km west to the Shimla Ridge, and is part of the seven-hill cluster.

== History ==
In the past, Summer Hill has offered residence to Mahatma Gandhi, who stayed here at the Georgian mansion of Rajkumari Amrit Kaur during his Shimla visits. Also known as the Potter's Hill, these pine and deodar laden slopes have many quaint residences, like one belonging to the family of noted painter Amrita Shergil (1913–1941).

== Today ==
Besides being a popular tourist destination, the Indian Institute of Advanced Study (established 1965), housed in the former Viceregal Lodge, which was built in 1884–88, is on the nearby Observatory Hill.

Today, it hosts the Himachal Pradesh University, which mainly offers post graduate programmes in Humanities, Commerce, Science, Management, Law and Languages, and was started in 1975. Most students walk to the Hill Station of Shimla from the campus, though Summer Hill lies on the Kalka-Shimla Railway line.
