= List of cities in Himachal Pradesh by population =

HP Himachal

This is a list of urban agglomerations, cities and towns as per 2011 census and 2024 estimates in the Indian state of Himachal Pradesh.

2011 Rank	2024 Rank	Name	Status	District	Census 1991 Population	Census 2001 Population	Census 2011 Population	Estimate (including outgrowth)
1	1	Shimla	Municipal Corporation	Shimla	102,186	142,555	169,578	~2,60,000
2	2	Dharamsala	Municipal Corporation	Kangra	17,493	19,124	53,543	~1,00,000
3	3	Solan	Municipal Corporation	Solan	21,751	34,206	47,418	~60,000
4	6	Mandi	Municipal Corporation	Mandi	23,202	26,873	41,348	~50,000
5	4	Palampur	Municipal Corporation	Kangra	3,638+ outgrowth	4,006+ outgrowth	40,385	~45,000
6	5	Baddi	Municipal Corporation	Solan		22,601	29,911	~40,000
7	7	Nahan	Municipal Council	Sirmaur	21,878	26,053	28,899	~40,000
8	8	Paonta Sahib	Municipal Council	Sirmaur	13,207	19,090	25,183	~40,000
9	10	Sundarnagar	Municipal Council	Mandi	20,397	23,986	24,344	~35,000
10	9	Chamba	Municipal Council	Chamba	17,194	20,327	19,933	~30,000
11	11	Una	Municipal Corporation	Una	12,001	15,900	18,722	~30,000
12	12	Kullu	Municipal Council	Kullu	14,569	18,306	18,536	~30,000
13	13	Hamirpur	Municipal Corporation	Hamirpur	12,544	17,252	17,604	~30,000
14	14	Bilaspur	Municipal Council	Bilaspur	10,609	13,058	13,654	~30,000
15	25	Yol Cantonment	Cantonment (Board)	Kangra	9,310	10,775	12,028	~13,000
16	15	Nalagarh	Municipal Council	Solan	7,448	9,443	10,708	~30,000
17	17	Nurpur	Municipal Council	Kangra	7,961	9,066	9,807	~20,000
18	18	Kangra	Municipal Council	Kangra	9,019	9,156	9,528	~20,000
19	19	Baijnath Paprola	Nagar Panchayat	Kangra				~20,000
20	21	Santokhgarh	Nagar Panchayat	Una	6,848	8,308	9,363	~15,000
21	22	Mehatpur Basdehra	Nagar Panchayat	Una	6,417	8,681	9,218	~15,000
22	27	Shamshi	Census Town	Kullu	...	8,038	8,870	~10,000
23	23	Parwanoo	Municipal Council	Solan	5,856	8,609	8,758	~15,000
24	16	Manali	Municipal Council	Kullu	2,433	6,265	8,096	~30,000
25	26	Tira Sujanpur	Municipal Council	Hamirpur	5,477	7,077	7,943	~12,000
26	28	Ghumarwin	Municipal Council	Bilaspur	3,708	5,721	7,899	~12,000
27	29	Dalhousie	Municipal Council	Chamba	6,855	7,425	7,051	~10,000
28	30	Rohru	Municipal Council	Shimla	3,366	6,607	6,875	~10,000
29	24	Nagrota Bagwan	Municipal Council	Kangra	4,503	5,657	5,900	~15,000
30	31	Rampur	Municipal Council	Shimla	4,342	5,653	5,655	~10,000
31	32	Jawalamukhi	Nagar Panchayat	Kangra	4,047	4,931	5,361	~10,000
32	20	Jogindernagar	Municipal Council	Mandi	4,513	5,048	5,335	~20,000
33	33	Dera Gopipur	Municipal Council	Kangra	3,378	4,336	4,816	~10,000
34	34	Sarkaghat	Nagar Panchayat	Mandi	3,093	3,706	4,715	~10,000
35		Jhakhri	Census Town	Shimla...	...	4,655		
36		Indora	Census Town	Kangra	...	4,201	4,534	
37		Bhuntar	Nagar Panchayat	Kullu	2,972	4,260	4,475	
38		Nadaun	Nagar Panchayat	Hamirpur	3,379	4,405	4,430	
39		Theog	Municipal Council	Shimla	2,757	3,754	4,353	
40		Kasauli Cantonment	Cantonment (Board)	Solan	4,385	4,990	3,885	
41		Gagret	Nagar Panchayat	Una	4,258	3,181	3,847	
42		Chuari Khas	Nagar Panchayat	Chamba	2,107	3,016	3,770	
43		Daulatpur	Nagar Panchayat	Una	2,748	3,354	3,763	
44		Sabathu Cantonment	Cantonment (Board)	Solan	3,700	5,719	3,685	
45		Dalhousie Cantonment	Cantonment (Board)	Chamba	1,744	1,964	3,549	
46		Rajgarh	Nagar Panchayat	Sirmaur	1,780	2,527	3,083	
47		Arki	Nagar Panchayat	Solan	1,976	2,877	3,040	
48		Dagshai Cantonment	Cantonment (Board)	Solan	2,163	2,750	2,904	
49		Seoni	Nagar Panchayat	Shimla	1,271	1,529	2,591	
50		Talai	Nagar Panchayat	Bilaspur	1,550	2,011	2,372	
51		Jutogh Cantonment	Cantonment (Board)	Shimla	5,827	2,420	2,062	
52		Chaupal	Nagar Panchayat	Shimla	1,074	1,507	1,851	
53		Rewalsar	Nagar Panchayat	Mandi	1,045	1,369	1,821	
54		Bakloh Cantonment	Cantonment (Board)	Chamba	1,989	1,810	1,805	
55		Jubbal	Nagar Panchayat	Shimla	1,379	1,346	1,640	
56		Bhota	Nagar Panchayat	Hamirpur	1,286	1,472	1,453	
57		Banjar	Nagar Panchayat	Kullu	1,037	1,262	1,414	
58		Bharmour	Big town	Chamba	972	1,267	1,376	
59		Naina devi	Municipal Council	Bilaspur	896	1,149	1,204	
60		Narkanda	Nagar Panchayat	Shimla	687	713	901	

Most of the cities and towns appear to have larger population than the above-mentioned figures due to rapid outgrowth in the recent years. For example, Baddi has emerged as one of the largest cities considering rapid industrialisation and urbanisation in the past decade. While, its official figures state its population to be around 29,911 as per 2011; the actual urban agglomerations population is around 100,000 since official figure takes into account only the notified part of the city as urban population. Apparently, urban agglomerations have significantly more population than the official figure. This holds true for most of the cities and town listed here when population of suburbs of respective city or town is added.

== Urban Agglomeration ==
In the census of India 2011, an Urban Agglomeration has been defined as follows:

"An urban agglomeration is a continuous urban spread constituting a town and its adjoining outgrowths (OGs), or two or more physically contiguous towns together with or without outgrowths of such towns. An Urban Agglomeration must consist of at least a statutory town and its total population (i.e. all the constituents put together) should not be less than 20,000 as per the 2001 Census. In varying local conditions, there were similar other combinations which have been treated as urban agglomerations satisfying the basic condition of contiguity."

=== Constituents of Urban Agglomerations in the Himachal Pradesh ===
The Urban Agglomerations and their constituents in the Himachal Pradesh, with a population of 1 lakh or above, are noted below:

- Baddi-Barotiwala-Nalagarh (BBN)
- Shimla
- Dharamshala (Kangra)
- Una
- Mandi
- Kullu-Manali
- Palampur
- Solan
- Paonta Sahib

== Urban Agglomeration constituents ==
Urban Agglomerations constituents with a population above 100,000, and less as per 2026 estimates and 2011 census are shown in the table below.

2024 Rank	Urban Agglomeration	Name of Constituent	District	Type*	Area Estimate (Sq. km)	Population 2026 (Estimate)	Population 2011
1	Baddi (BBN)	Baddi, Barotiwala, Nalagarh	Solan	M Corp.	244	≈4,30,260	3,50,000
2	Shimla	Shimla, Sanjauli, Summer Hill, Chotta Shimla, New Shimla, Tutikandi, Annadale, Panthaghati, Boileauganj, Bharari, Krishna Nagar, Mehli, Dudhli, Poabo, Kamyana, Chamyana, Malyana, Hiranagar, Khwara Chowki, Kuftadhar, Strawberry Hill, Talland, Kelston, Richmount, Jakhu, Housing Board Colony, Engine Ghar, Cemetry, US Club, Kachighati, Chakkar, Jathiya Devi, Vikasnagar, Taradevi, Chaura Maidan, Kanlog, Lower Bazaar, Kaithu, Dhalli, Bhattakufer, Kasumpti, Mashobra, Shoghi, Kufri	Shimla	M Corp.	336	≈3,10,000	2,70,000
3	Kangra	Kangra, Dharamshala, Gaggal, Nagrota Bagwan, Shahpur	Kangra	M Corp.	310	≈2,10,000	1,70,000
4	Una	Una, Amb, Gagret, Haroli, Daulatpur, Mehatpur	Una	M Corp.	682	≈1,50,000	1,30,000
5	Mandi	Mandi, Sunder Nagar, Nerchowk	Mandi	M Corp.	157	≈1,40,000	1,20,000
6	Kullu	Kullu, Manali, Bhuntar, Bajaura, Patlikhuhal, Naggar	Kullu	M Council	140	≈1,30,000	1,10,000
7	Palampur	Palampur, Baijnath, Paprola, Panchrukhi, Bhawarna, Sulah, Gopalpur, Kunsal, Mahakal, Bahi Khas, Uttrala, Sansal	Kangra	M Corp.	301	≈1,20,000	1,00,000
8	Solan	Solan, Kasauli,Dharampur, Subathu, Dagshai, Barog, Kandaghat, Waknaghat, Dadhog, Loharo, Sumti, Daghota	Solan	M Corp.	70	≈1,10,000	90,000
9	Paonta Sahib	Paonta Sahib, Misarwala, Shampur, Bhagani, Majra, Gondpur	Sirmaur	M Council	204	≈1,00,000	80,000
10	Hamirpur	Hamirpur, Dosarka, Dulehera, Ghanal, Muthwan, Jateri, Har Khalsa, Sasan, Himuda Colony, Neri, Tikkar, Bhota	Hamirpur	M Corp.	68	≈90,000	70,000
11	Bilaspur	Bilaspur, Barmana, Ghagas, Ghumarwin, Bhager, Auhar, Bharari, Kothi, Kothipura, Manman, Dharasani, Bamta, Tihri, Chandpur	Bilaspur	M Council	175	≈80,000	60,000
12	Joginder Nagar	Joginder Nagar, Chauntra, Ahju, Bir, Sainthal, Harabagh, Dohag	Mandi	M Council	70	≈70,000	50,000
13	Dehra	Dehra, Gopipur, Pragpur, Garli, Jawalamukhi, Chanaur, Dadasiba, Kathog, Sapri	Kangra	M Council	160	≈60,000	50,000
14	Chamba	Chamba, Sarol, Parel, Karian, Sultanpur, Rajpura, Udaipur	Chamba	M Council	50	≈50,000	35,000
15	Nurpur	Nurpur, Jassur, Chattroli Khas, Naga Bari, Kandwal	Kangra	M Council	40	≈40,000	30,000
16	Nahan	Nahan, Yashwant Vihar Colony, Chakreda	Sirmaur	M Council	15	≈40,000	30,000
