= Shimla Municipal Corporation =

Local government in Shimla, Himachal Pradesh, India

- Seal

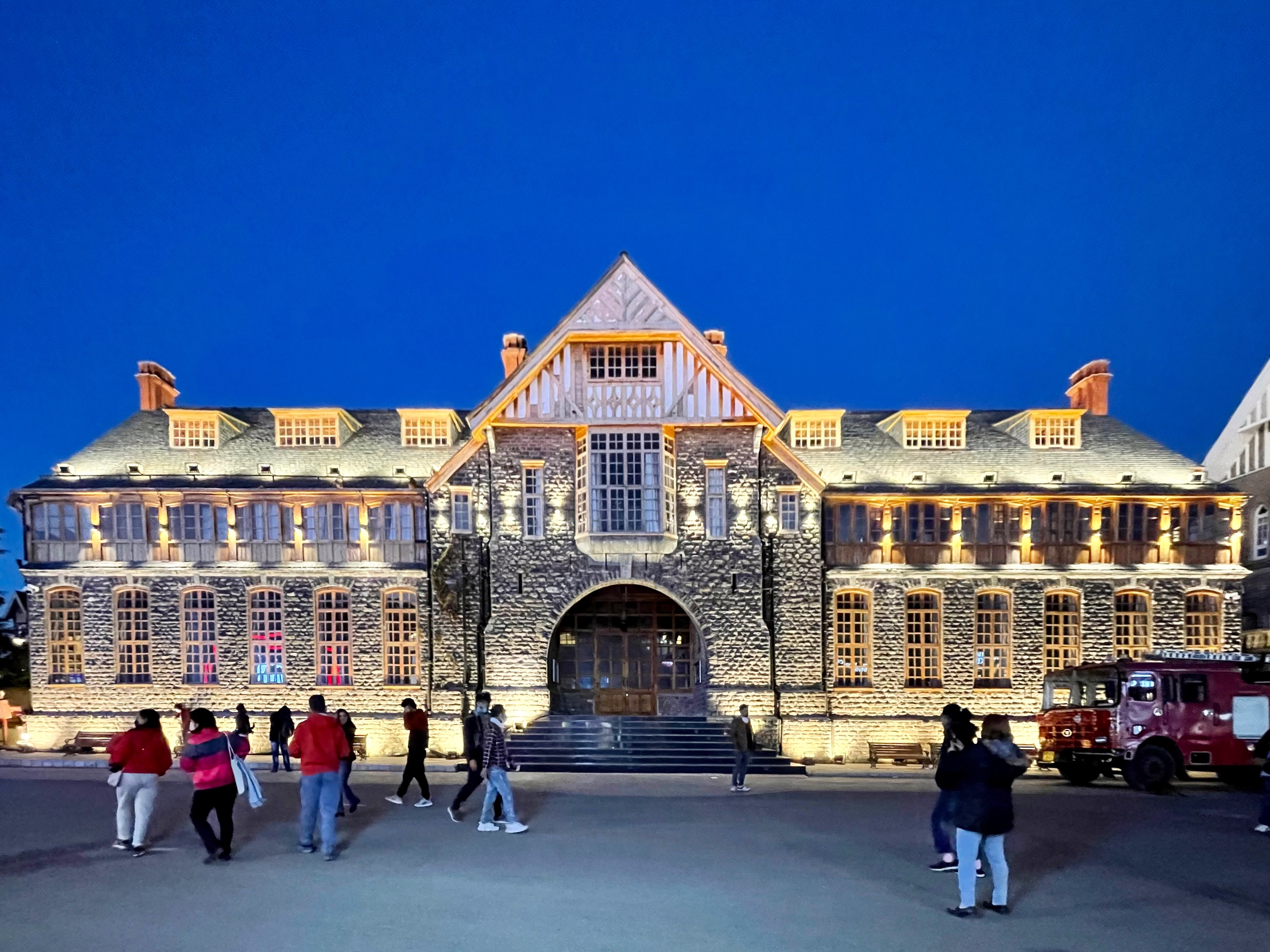
- Municipal Corporation Building illuminated at night

Type
- Type: Municipal Corporation

History
- Founded: December 1851; 174 years ago

Leadership
- Mayor: Surinder Chauhan (INC)
- Deputy Mayor: Uma Kaushal (INC)
- Municipal Commissioner: Bhupinder Attri

Structure
- Seats: 34
- Political groups: Government (24): INC (24); Opposition (10): BJP (9); CPI(M) (1)
- Length of term: 5 years

Elections
- Voting system: First-past-the-post
- Last election: 2 May 2023
- Next election: 2028

Motto
- Work is Worship

Meeting place
- Town Hall, Shimla

Website
- shimlamc.hp.gov.in

Shimla Municipal Corporation (SMC) is the municipal corporation of Shimla, the capital of Himachal Pradesh, and is the chief nodal agency for the administration of the city. Municipal Corporation mechanism in India was introduced during British Rule with formation of municipal corporation in Madras (Chennai) in 1688, later followed by municipal corporations in Bombay (Mumbai) and Calcutta (Kolkata) by 1762. Shimla Municipal Corporation is headed by the Mayor of city and governed by a Commissioner. Shimla Municipal Corporation has been formed with functions to improve the infrastructure of town.

== Overview ==
Established in 1851, the Shimla Municipal Corporation is an elected body comprising 41 councillors, five of whom are nominated by the Government of Himachal Pradesh. The number of wards increased from 28 to 34 in 2017 and then in 2022, 7 more wards were proposed to be added. The nominations are based on prominence in the fields of social service, academics and other activities. Fifty per cent of seats are reserved for women. The elections take place every five years and the mayor and deputy mayor are elected by and amongst the councillors themselves. Surinder Chauhan and Uma Kaushal of INC are the present Mayor and Deputy Mayor respectively. The two major political parties are the Bharatiya Janata Party and Indian National Congress. Communist Party of India (Marxist) has been nearing extinction with just 1 member in current corporation. The administrative head of the corporation is the Municipal Commissioner who is appointed by the state government. Raipur Municipal Corporation has been formed with functions to improve the infrastructure of town.

== Revenue sources ==
The following are the Income sources for the corporation from the Central and State Government.

=== Revenue from taxes ===
Following is the Tax related revenue for the corporation.

- Property tax.
- Profession tax.
- Entertainment tax.
- Grants from Central and State Government like Goods and Services Tax.
- Advertisement tax.

=== Revenue from non-tax sources ===
Following is the Non Tax related revenue for the corporation.

- Water usage charges.
- Fees from Documentation services.
- Rent received from municipal property.
- Funds from municipal bonds.

== List of wards and Elected Councillors ==
In 2022, a delimitation exercise initially proposed expanding the Shimla Municipal Corporation to 41 wards. However, an ordinance passed in January 2023 reverted the number of wards back to 34 ahead of the May 2023 municipal elections.

The corporation currently comprises 34 elected councillors and 5 councillors nominated by the Government of Himachal Pradesh. In the 2023 elections, the Indian National Congress (INC) secured a majority by winning 24 seats, the Bharatiya Janata Party (BJP) won 9 seats, and the Communist Party of India (Marxist) won 1 seat.

Shimla Municipal Corporation Wards (2023)
Ward No.	Ward Name	Assembly Constituency	Councillor Name	Political Party
01	Bharari	Shimla Urban	Smt. Meena Chauhan	BJP
02	Ruldu Bhatta	Shimla Urban	Smt. Saroj Thakur	BJP
03	Kaithu	Shimla Urban	Smt. Kanta Suyal	INC
04	Annadale	Shimla Urban	Smt. Urmila Kashyap	INC
05	Summer Hill	Shimla Rural	Sh. Virender Thakur	CPI(M)
06	Totu	Shimla Rural	Smt. Monika Bhardwaj	INC
07	Majhat	Shimla Rural	Smt. Anita Sharma	INC
08	Boileauganj	Shimla Rural	Sh. Daleep Thapa	INC
09	Kachighati	Shimla Urban	Smt. Kiran Sharma	INC
10	Tutikandi	Shimla Urban	Smt. Uma Kaushal	INC
11	Nabha	Shimla Urban	Smt. Simi Nanda	INC
12	Phagli	Shimla Urban	Sh. Kalyan Dhiman	BJP
13	Krishna Nagar	Shimla Urban	Sh. Bittu Kumar	BJP
14	Ram Bazar Ganj	Shimla Urban	Smt. Sushma Kuthiala	INC
15	Lower Bazaar	Shimla Urban	Smt. Umang Banga	INC
16	Jakhu	Shimla Urban	Sh. Atul Gautam	INC
17	Benmore	Shimla Urban	K. Sheenam Kataria	INC
18	Engine Ghar	Shimla Urban	Sh. Ankush Verma	INC
19	Sanjauli Chowk	Shimla Urban	Smt. Mamta Chandel	INC
20	Upper Dhalli	Kasumpti	Smt. Kamlesh Mehta	BJP
21	Lower Dhalli	Kasumpti	Smt. Vishakha Modi	INC
22	Shanti Vihar	Kasumpti	Sh. Vineet Sharma	INC
23	Bhattakufar	Kasumpti	Sh. Narinder Thakur	INC
24	Sangti	Kasumpti	Sh. Kuldeep Thakur	INC
25	Malyana	Kasumpti	Smt. Shanta Verma	INC
26	Panthaghati	Kasumpti	Smt. Kushum Thakur	BJP
27	Kasumpati	Kasumpti	Smt Rachana Sharma	BJP
28	Chotta Shimla	Kasumpti	Sh. Surinder Chauhan (Mayor)	INC
29	Vikasnagar	Kasumpti	Smt. Rachana Bhardwaj	INC
30	Kangnadhar	Kasumpti	Sh. Ram Rattan	INC
31	Pateog	Kasumpti	Smt. Asha Sharma	INC
32	New Shimla	Kasumpti	Smt. Nisha Thakur	BJP
33	Khalini	Kasumpti	Sh. Chaman Prakash	INC
34	Kanlog	Kasumpti	Sh. Alok Pathania	BJP

=== Nominated Councillors ===
The Government of Himachal Pradesh nominates 5 councillors to the corporation based on their prominence in fields like social service and academics.

- Sh. Ashwani Kumar Sood
- Sh. Gopal Sharma
- Smt. Gitanjali Bhagra
- Sh. Vinod Kumar Bhatia
- Sh. Raj Kumar Sharma

== See also ==
- List of municipal corporations in India
