= Nawang Tashi Rapten =

Tibetan lama

Nawang Tashi Rapten (born 16 April 2018) is a Tibetan lama of the Nyingma school. Among the Tibetan Buddhist community, he is formally recognized as the reincarnation of Taklung Tsetrul Rinpoche.

== Life ==
Nawang Tashi Rapten was born on 16 April 2018 in Rangrik village of the Tabo region of Spiti valley in Lahaul-Spiti district of Himachal Pradesh. He was identified as the reincarnation of Taklung Tsetrul Rinpoche, a former head of the Nyingma School, who died on 24 December 2015. When Taklung Rinpoche's disciples found Nawang Tashi Rapten after nearly six years of searching, they realized that their master had been reincarnated. In November 2022, when he was four, he was seated as the successor to Taklung Tsetrul Rinpoche. He is currently enrolled in the nursery class at Serkong Public School, Tabo. He will begin his monastic education at Dorjidak Monastery in Panthaghati, Shimla, after completing his nursery school education. On 28 November 2022, his head was tonsured to induct him into his new position, and he started his formal religious education.

== See also ==
- Nyingma § Internal administration
