= 2017 Shimla Municipal Corporation election =

2017 Shimla Municipal corporation election
- May 2017
- All 34 seats of the Shimla Municipal Corporation; 18 seats needed for a majority
Party	Leader	Vote %	Seats	+/–
BJP			17	+5
INC			12	+2
CPI(M)			1	−2
Independent			4	+4
This lists parties that won seats. See the complete results below.
Majority before	Majority after
Communist Party of India (Marxist)	Bharatiya Janata Party

The elections for the Shimla Municipal Corporation were held in May 2017. The number of wards was increased to 34 from the earlier 25 wards.

== Overview ==
The Bharatiya Janata Party became the single largest party in the 2017 Municipal Corporation elections with 17 out of the 34 seats, falling short of a majority by just 1 seat, creating history by winning in the bastion of the Indian National Congress and formed the new city government. It was the first time in the history of Shimla Municipal Corporation that the BJP had managed to secure a win. Soon after the results, 1 independent corporator, joined BJP helping it reach the majority mark. BJP candidate Satya Kaundal was elected as the mayor of Shimla, with the party bagging the post for the first time. The Communist Party of India (Marxist) which had won the previous mayoral election and bagged 3 seats fell back to 1 seat in a setback to the party.

== Result ==
2017 Shimla Municipal Corporation election results
No.	Party	Abbreviation	Flag	Symbol	Number of Corporators	Change
1.	Bharatiya Janata Party	BJP			17	▲5
2.	Indian National Congress	INC			12	▲2
3.	Communist Party of India (Marxist)	CPI(M)			1	▼2
4.	Independents	IND			4	▲4

== See also ==
- 2022 Shimla Municipal Corporation election
- Shimla Municipal Corporation
