= List of districts of Himachal Pradesh by population =

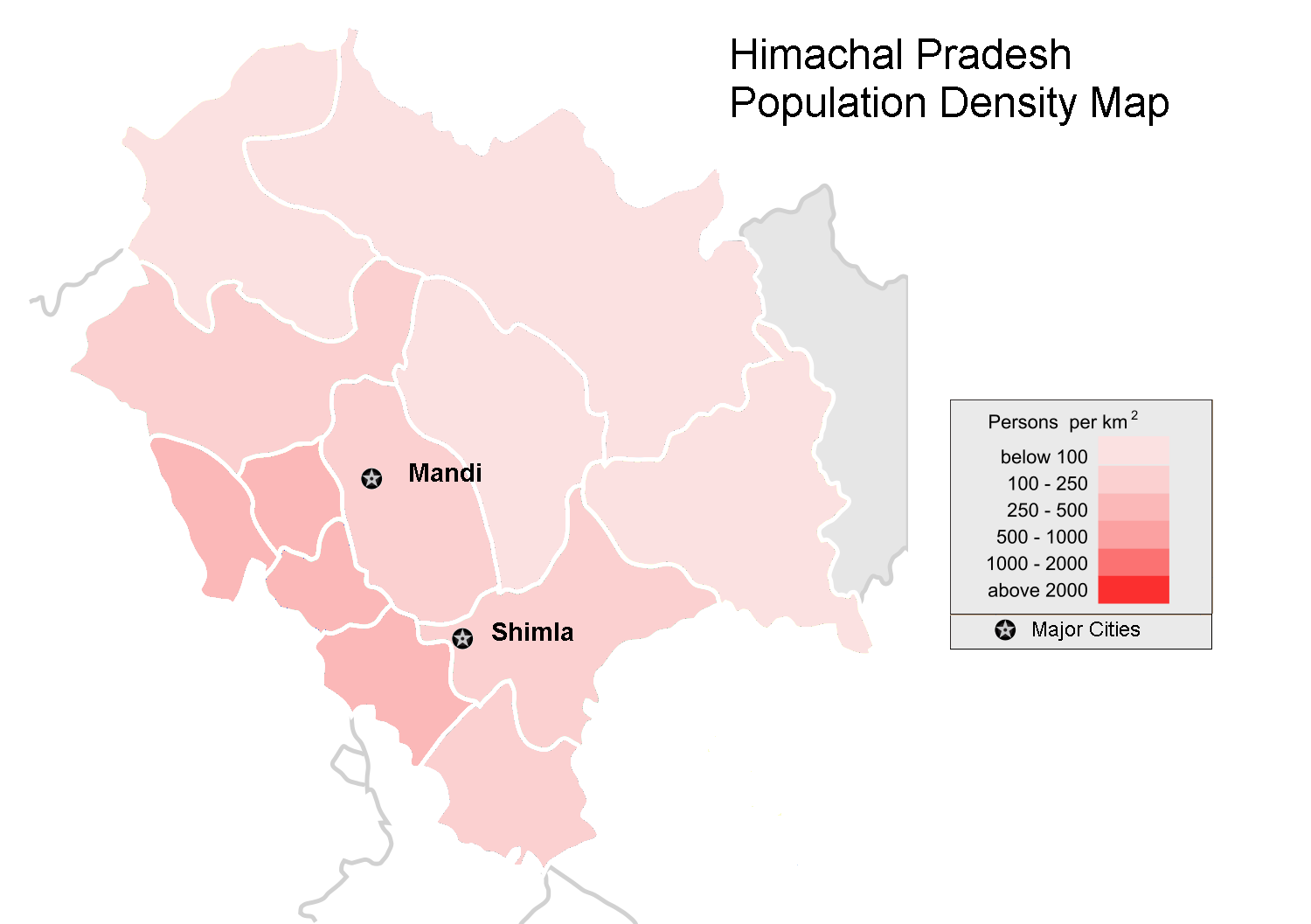
Population density map of Himachal Pradesh.

The total geographical area of Himachal Pradesh is 55,673 square kilometres (21,495 sq mi)^{α}. Population density is rounded to the nearest integer.

As per census data 2011, the total population of Himachal Pradesh is 200

This is a list of the population of the Districts of Himachal Pradesh.

Rank	Districts	Population (2011 Census)	% of Population	Population (2001 Census)	% of Population (2001)	% Growth (2001–2011)	Decadal Growth (2001–2011)	Rural Pop.	Urban Pop.	Area km^{2}	Density (per km^{2})	Area mi^{2}	Density (per mi^{2})	Sex ratio
01	Chamba	518,844	7.57%	460,887	7.58%	12.58%	57,957	4,00,653	36,191	6,528	80	2,521	31	989
02	Kangra	1,507,223	21.98%	1,339,030	22.03%	12.56%	168,193	1,420,864	86,359	5,739	263	2216	102	1013
03	Lahaul and Spiti	31,528	0.46%	33,224	0.55%	-5.10%	-1696	31,528	0	13,833	2	5341	0.8	916
04	Kullu	437,474	6.38%	381,571	6.28%	14.65%	55,903	3,96,216	41,258	5,503	79	2125	31	950
05	Mandi	999,518	14.58%	901,344	14.83%	10.89%	98,174	9,36,894	62,624	3,951	253	1526	98	1012
06	Hamirpur	454,293	6.63%	412,700	6.79%	10.08%	41,593	4,22,880	31,413	1,118	406	432	157	1096
07	Una	521,057	7.60%	448,273	7.38%	16.24%	72,784	4,76,140	44,917	1,549	338	598	131	977
08	Bilaspur	382,056	5.57%	340,885	5.61%	12.08%	41,171	3,56,930	25,126	1,167	327	451	126	981
09	Solan	576,670	8.41%	500,557	8.24%	15.21%	76,113	4,74,592	1,02,078	1,936	298	748	115	884
10	Sirmaur	530,164	7.73%	458,593	7.55%	15.61%	71,571	4,72,926	57,238	2,825	188	1091	73	915
11	Shimla	813,384	11.86%	722,502	11.89%	12.58%	90,882	6,11,884	2,01,500	5,131	159	1981	61	916
12	Kinnaur	84,298	1.23%	78,334	1.29%	07.61%	5,964	84,298	0	6,401	13	2,471	5	818
Total	Himachal Pradesh	6,856,509	100%	6,077,900	100%	12.95%	778,609	6,167,805	688,704	55,673	123	319	9740	972
