= Panthaghati =

Neighbourhood in Shimla, Himachal Pradesh, India

- Neighbourhood
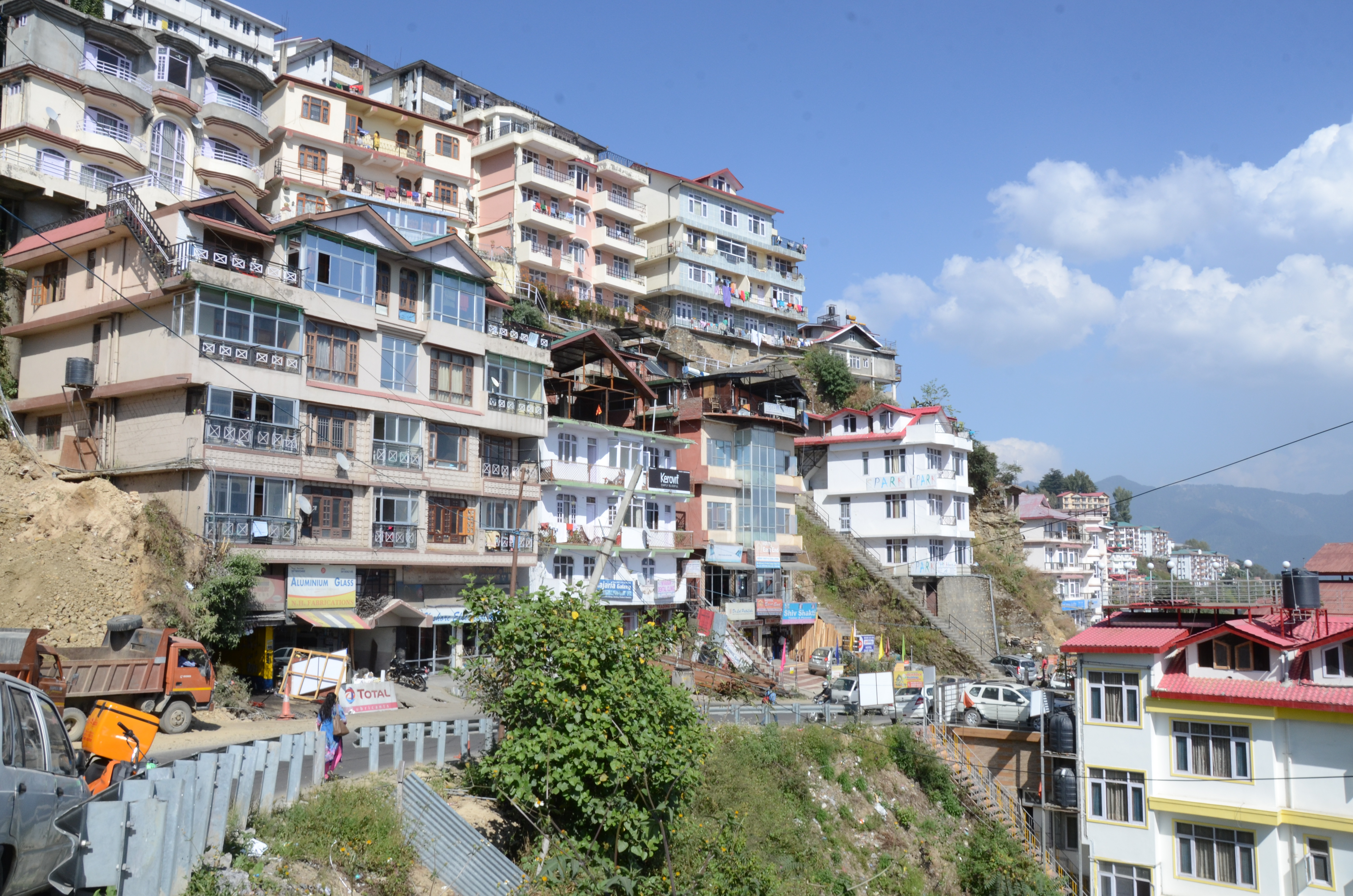
- Views of Panthaghati locality
- Interactive map of Panthaghati
- Country: India
- State: Himachal Pradesh
- District: Shimla
- City: Shimla
- Elevation: 2,053 m (6,736 ft)
- PIN: 171009

Panthaghati is a part of Shimla in the North Indian state of Himachal Pradesh. It is located on south-eastern Shimla. It is one of the most developed and posh localities of Shimla.

== Location ==
Panthaghati is situated at the south-eastern Shimla. It is one of the most posh residential localities of the city. It is situated with other neighbour localities of the city such as Vikasnagar, Mehli, Kasumpati, etc. It is situated between Deodar and Pine forests. It is the first welcoming point of the city when arriving from Junga and Chail. It lies on the bypass from ISBT Shimla, to avoid the city center.

== Importance ==
It lies on NH-5 which makes it strategically important. Panthaghati is also home to various notable and important state departments and offices too such as Himalayan Forest Research Institute, Passport Sewa Kendra, etc. Panthaghati has developed into one of the major residential suburbs of Shimla. Due to expansion of the city beyond the old colonial core areas like The Ridge, Mall Road, Kaithu, Annadale, etc. Panthaghati became an important urban extension zone with apartments, government housing, schools, and markets. It lies on the southeastern side of Shimla and connects several important localities such as Kasumpati, New Shimla, Mehli, Chotta Shimla, and ISBT Shimla. Because of this, it acts as a transit corridor for daily commuters. Panthaghati is also plays an important role in traffic management and bus connectivity of the city. Panthaghati has seen rapid real-estate development because of relatively better road access and availability of land compared to the old core city. Modern apartment complexes, local shopping areas, and mixed residential and commercial use have increased its economic importance. The locality is also known for Buddhist and spiritual centres, including monasteries and meditation institutions, most notable is Dorje Drak.
