= Shimla Summer Festival =

Regional festival in India

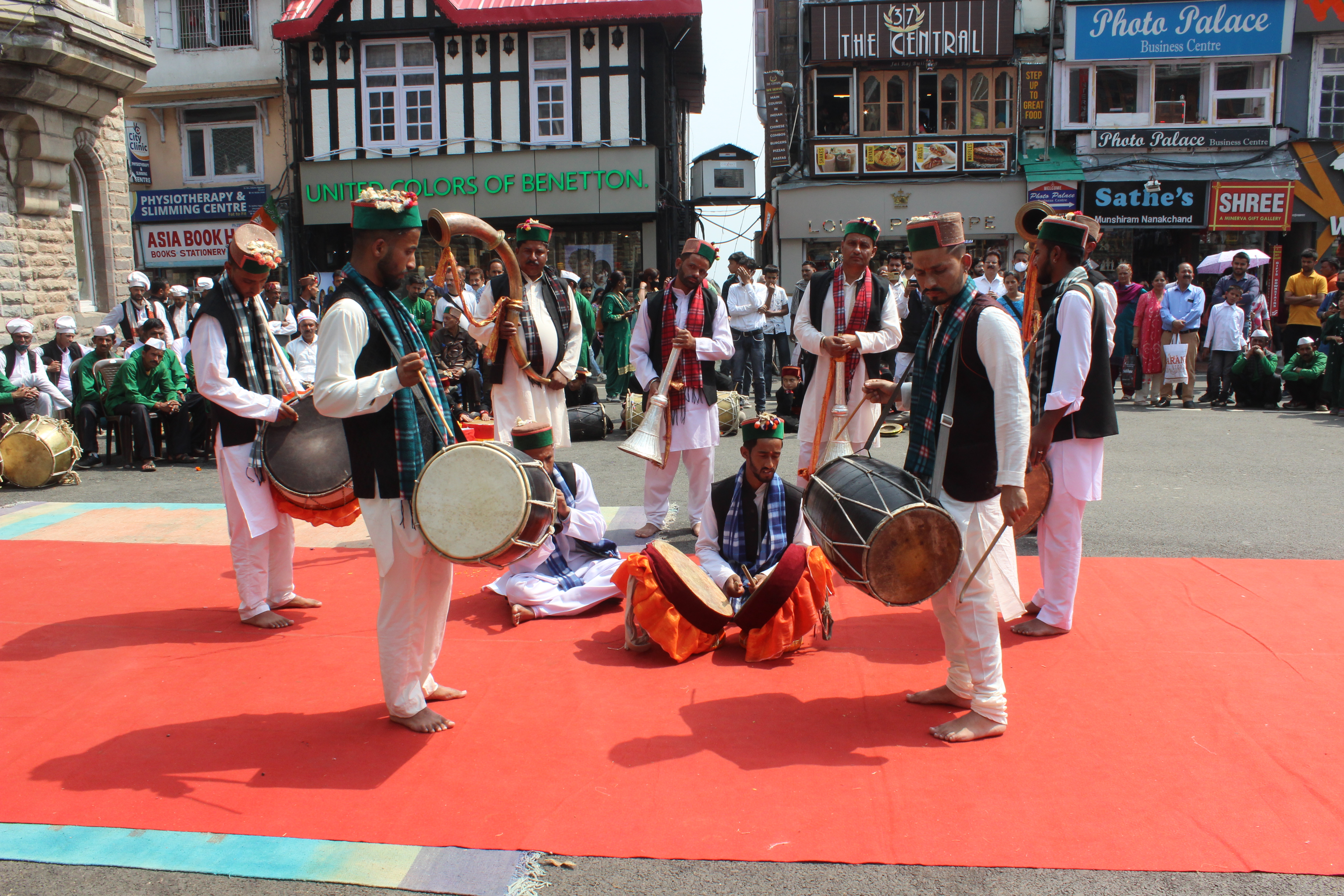
Folk Gatha performed by local artists in Summer Festival at Shimla Mall Road

Shimla Summer Festival is a multi-day cultural festival held in May or June in Shimla, Himachal Pradesh, India. It has been held since 1960.

The Shimla Summer Festival was instituted in 1960 as one of three summer festivals to increase tourism in Himachal Pradesh. It gives thanks to the gods for the harvest and opens the summer season; it usually takes place in May, sometimes in June.

Held at the Ridge Ground in Shimla, the festival includes a fair selling local products and traditional arts and crafts, food stalls, a flower show, performances by both local folk musicians and touring musicians, theatre performances, a magic show, a fashion show showcasing traditional dress, a sports tournament, musical, poster making and photography contests, and a dog show. It attracts many visitors.

The 2022 festival scheduled events all day for the first time. The 2023 festival was held over four days starting June 1, with monitored access and the city divided into five security sectors.
