= New Shimla =

Neighbourhood in Shimla, Himachal Pradesh, India

- Neighbourhood
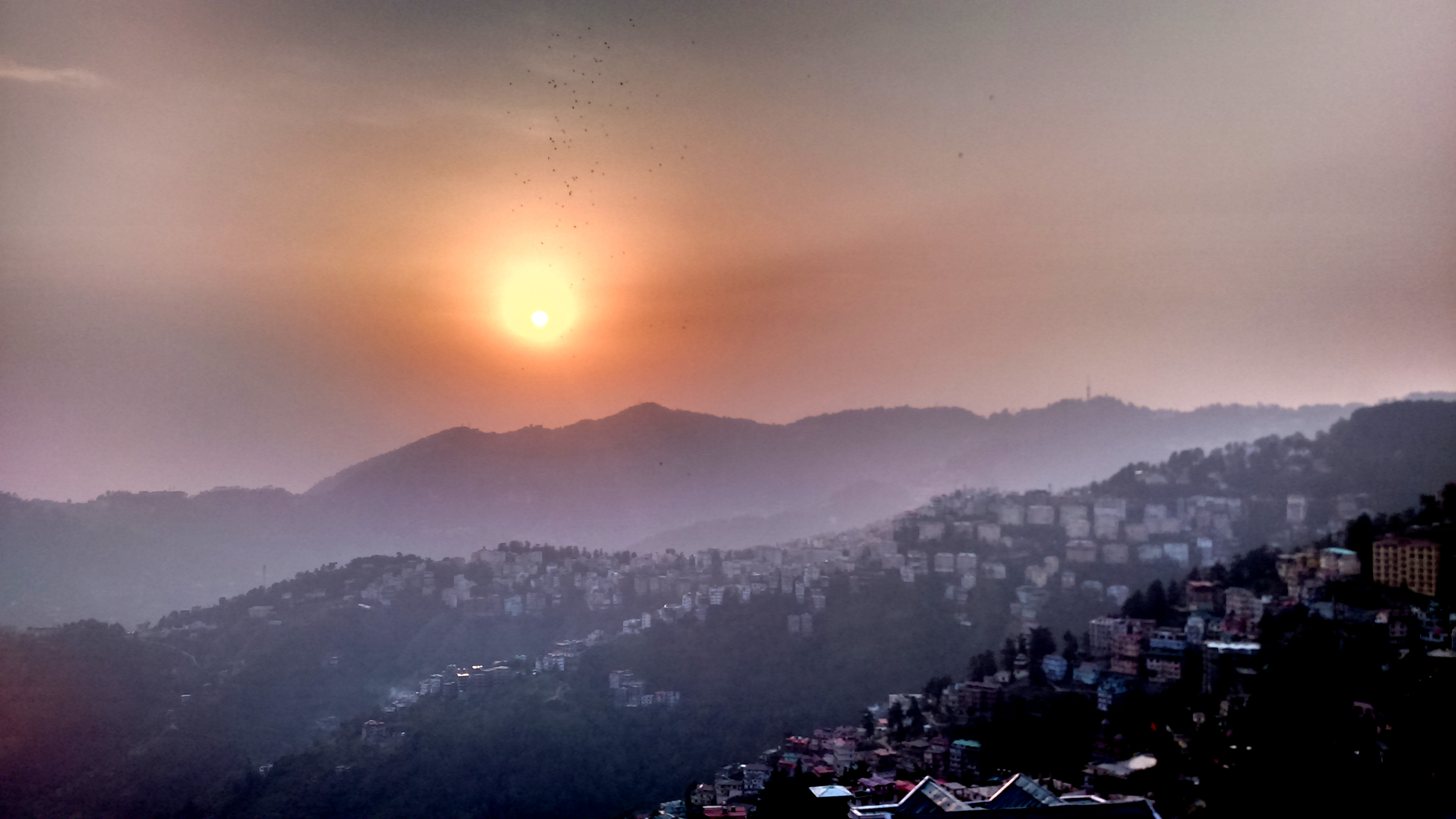
- View of New Shimla from uphill at evening
- Interactive map of New Shimla
- Coordinates: 31.081538°N 77.166998°E
- Country: India
- State: Himachal Pradesh
- District: Shimla
- City: Shimla
- Elevation: 1,905 m (6,250 ft)
- PIN: 171009

New Shimla is a part of Shimla, in the North Indian state of Himachal Pradesh. It is the most modern planned part of Shimla.

== History and Etymology ==
New Shimla is one of the newer planned residential areas of Shimla, that's why it was named as New Shimla. It was developed mainly by the Himachal Pradesh Housing and Urban Development Authority (HIMUDA) to reduce population pressure from the old colonial core of Shimla such as the Mall Road, Lower Bazaar, Kaithu, Chotta Shimla and Sanjauli and also to reduce pressure from other parts of the city. The area began expanding significantly during the late 20th century, especially in the 1980s, when Shimla started facing overcrowding, shortage of housing, traffic congestion and limited land availability. Unlike city center, which developed mainly during the British rule, New Shimla was designed as a planned urban settlement with wider roads, residential sectors, apartment colonies, small markets, schools, parks and government housing. Today, it is considered one of the most modern and organized parts of Shimla.

== Geography ==
New Shimla lies in the western part of Shimla city and is attached to major parts like Chotta Shimla, Khalini, Vikasnagar, Kanlog, etc. The area overlooks surrounding Pine and Deodar covered hills. Like most of Shimla, New Shimla is built on steep Himalayan slopes and ridges. The terrain consists of narrow mountain ridges, forested hills, deep valleys, terraced construction, most of the area in New Shimla is concrete and buildings.

== Sectors ==
New Shimla is generally divided into Phase I, Phase II, and Phase III, and within these phases there are numbered residential sectors developed mainly by HIMUDA. Mainly there are six sectors in New Shimla.
