= 2012 Shimla Municipal Corporation election =

2012 Shimla Municipal corporation election
- May 2012
- All 25 seats of the Shimla Municipal Corporation; 13 seats needed for a majority
Party	Leader	Vote %	Seats	+/–
BJP	Satinder Singh Manhas		12	+4
INC	Madhu Sood		10	−5
CPI(M)	Sanjay Chauhan		3	+1
Independent			0	0
This lists parties that won seats. See the complete results below.
Majority before	Majority after
Indian National Congress	?

Elections for the Shimla Municipal Corporation were held in May 2012. These were the first direct elections for mayor and deputy mayor in the corporation's history. 13 out of 25 wards were reserved for women for the first time.

== Background ==
The Indian National Congress won a majority of 15 seats in the previous municipal corporation elections and the party selected Madhu Sood mayor of Shimla.

== Overview ==
The Himachal Pradesh state Bharatiya Janata Party government decided to elections for the post of mayor and deputy mayor directly for the first time as opposed to letting the party with the majority in the corporation deciding the posts on its own.

The Communist Party of India (Marxist) made history by capturing both the posts of mayor and deputy mayor, unseating the Indian National Congress in its bastion of 25 years.

== Results ==
=== Mayoral election ===
==== Mayor ====
Party	Candidate	Votes
CPI(M)	Devinder Singh Chauhan	21,903
BJP	Satinder Singh Manhas	14,035
INC	Madhu Sood	13,278
Source: The Hindu

==== Deputy Mayor ====
Party	Candidate	Votes
CPI(M)	Tikender Singh Panwar	21,196
BJP	Digvijay Singh Chauhan	16,418
INC	Devinder Singh Chauhan	13,205
Source: India Today

=== Municipal Corporation ===
No.	Party	Abbreviation	Flag	Symbol	Number of Corporators	Change
1.	Bharatiya Janata Party	BJP			12	▲4
2.	Indian National Congress	INC			10	▼5
3.	Communist Party of India (Marxist)	CPI(M)			3	▲1
4.	Independents	IND			0	Steady
Total wards					25	
