= Chotta Shimla =

Neighbourhood in Shimla, Himachal Pradesh, India

- Neighbourhood
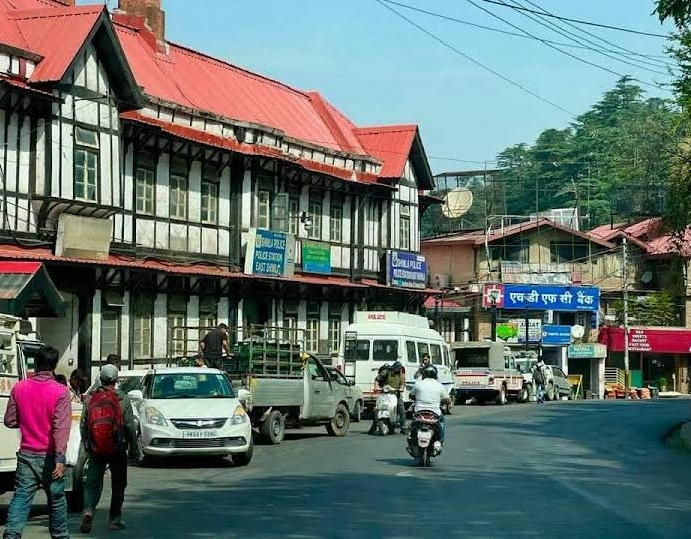
- Ramchandra Chowk, Chotta Shimla
- Interactive map of Chotta Shimla
- Coordinates: 31.090006°N 77.180480°E
- Country: India
- State: Himachal Pradesh
- District: Shimla
- City: Shimla
- Elevation: 2,166 m (7,106 ft)
- PIN: 171002

Chotta Shimla is a part of Shimla, in the North Indian state of Himachal Pradesh. It is one of the most densely populated and important parts of Shimla city, which includes the headquarters of various state departments.

== Etymology ==
The literal meaning of Chotta Shimla is "Small Shimla". Historically, the central British administrative and commercial area was concentrated around The Mall and The Ridge. The outer settlement which was developing slightly away from the original core came to be informally distinguished as "Chhota Shimla". Over time, it became the official name of the locality.

== History ==
Before the British period, the hills around present day Shimla, including the Chhota Shimla ridge, were sparsely populated forested areas under Keonthal state. The region mainly consisted of dense Deodar and Oak forests with a few scattered settlements (villages) and temples. From 1830 to 1860, Shimla expanded along several ridges, including areas known as Chhota Shimla, Kaithu, Annadale and Summer Hill. Multiple roads, bridges, and administrative buildings were gradually constructed. Lord Combermere built many important connecting routes around Shimla in the late 1820s, the most notable of which is Combermere Bridge, which was the first pucca bridge of Shimla, helping Chhota Shimla, Panthaghati, Mehli and other areas become accessible.

== Geography ==
Chotta Shimla is situated between Deodar and Oak forests. There are many roads, old residences, walking paths, and institutional layouts that retain colonial-era urban planning influences similar to other old Shimla localities. Chotta Shimla is located immediately between Shimla city center and Sanjauli. Chotta Shimla is the connecting point of the city center to various localities of the city such as Sanjauli, New Shimla, Kasumpati, etc.

== Importance ==
After Himachal Pradesh became a full state in 1971, Chhota Shimla became one of the administrative centers of the state government. It is the connecting point of the city from the city center areas like The Ridge, The Mall, Bemloi, etc to other areas of North-Western Shimla such as Panthaghati, Kasumpati, Vikasnagar, Mehli, Malyana, etc. The state's most important headquarters and offices like Himachal Pradesh Secretariat, Himachal Pradesh Police Headquarters in Nigam Vihar and several other government departments are located here.
