= Operation Gang Bust =

2026 gang crackdown in India

- Date: 13 January 2026 – present
- Location: New Delhi, Haryana, Himachal, Rajastan, Uttar Pradesh, Punjab, India
- Goals: Crackdown on criminals
- Status: Ongoing

Parties
Delhi Police; Haryana Police; Punjab Police; Himachal Pradesh Police; Rajasthan Police; Uttar Pradesh Police	Criminals

Casualties
- Arrested: 854

On 13 January 2026, multiple Indian state police agencies, led by the Delhi Police, launched a 48-hour gang-crackdown operation. Around 9,000 police men from the Delhi Police, Haryana Police, Punjab Police, Himachal Pradesh Police, Rajasthan Police, and Uttar Pradesh Police carried out the operation in their respective districts. The agencies have reported the arrests of 854 people, including 280 known gangsters. Another 6,494 suspects were brought into questioning by the police. The police have also seized around 300 illegal arms, 130 rounds of ammunition, and Rs 25 lakh of cash from the arrested.
