= Kilar =

Kilar may refer to

- Wojciech Kilar (1932–2013), Polish composer of classical and film music
- Qerekhlar, a village in Iran
- Kilar, a village in Uttara Kannada district, Karnataka, India.
- Killar, a village Himachal Pradesh, India.
