= Bhattakufer =

- Neighbourhood
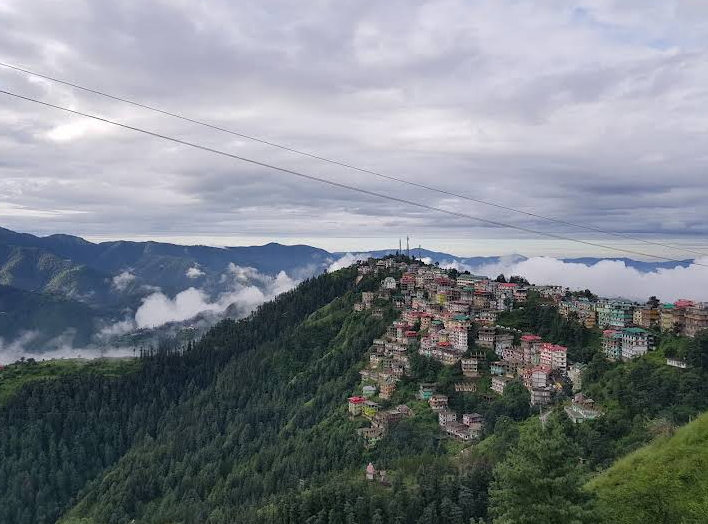
- Views of Bhattakufer
- Bhattakufer location in Shimla
- Coordinates: 31.093°N 77.207°E
- Country: India
- State: Himachal Pradesh
- District: Shimla
- City: Shimla
- Elevation: 2,162 m (7,093 ft)
- PIN: 171006

Bhattakufer is a part of Shimla city in North Indian state of Himachal Pradesh, India.

== Geography ==
Bhattakufer is located at 31.093, 77.207. It has an average elevation of 197 hectares. It is situated on National Highway NH22 by pass road, 7 km away from Shimla. As per the 2001 census, the village had a population of 765, with 421 males and 344 females.
