= Kanlog =

Neighbourhood in Shimla, Himachal Pradesh, India

- Neighbourhood
- Interactive map of Kanlog
- Coordinates: 31.092781°N 77.168728°E
- Country: India
- State: Himachal Pradesh
- District: Shimla
- City: Shimla
- Elevation: 1,991.79 m (6,534.7 ft)
- PIN: 171001

Kanlog is a part of Shimla in the North Indian state of Himachal Pradesh. It is a residential and semi-forested locality in the southern-central part of Shimla. It lies on the hilly slopes below other localities of the city like New Shimla and near important institutional zones of the city. As compared to the crowded city center, Kanlog is quieter, more residential, and known for its steep terrain, greenery, and old colonial-era surroundings.
