= Chowari =

- Town
- Location in Himachal Pradesh Chowari (India)
- Coordinates: 32.433331°N 76.016673°E
- Country: India
- State: Himachal Pradesh
- District: Chamba
- Elevation: 1,202 m (3,944 ft)

Population (2011)
  - Total: 3,770

Languages
  - Official: Hindi
- Time zone: UTC+5:30 (IST)
- Post code: 176302
- Area code: +91-18992-xxxxx
- Vehicle registration: HP-57
- Website: hpchamba.nic.in

Chowari (also known as Chuari Khas or Chuāri Khās) is a town and a Nagar Panchayat (City Council) in Chamba district, in the Indian state of Himachal Pradesh.

== Geography ==
Chowari is located at 32°26′N 76°01′E. It has an average elevation of 1,202 metres (3,944 ft).

== Demographics ==
As of 2001 India census, Chowari had a population of 3016. Males constitute 52% of the population and females 48%. Chowari has an average literacy rate of 76%, higher than the national average of 59.5%; male literacy is 81% and female literacy is 70%. In Chowari, 12% of the population is under 6 years of age.
