= Taklung Tsetrul Rinpoche =

Taklung Tsetrul Rinpoche (1926 – 23 December 2015) was a Tibetan lama and the Supreme Head of the Nyingma School of Tibetan Buddhism. He received the highest Dzogchen teachings from Polu Khenpo Dorje, a direct disciple of Khenpo Ngawang Pelzang.

"Kyabje Taklung Tsetrul Rinpoche, throneholder of the Dorje Drak monastery, accepted the position of the Supreme Head of Nyingmapa lineage, the “Old Translation Tradition” in Tibetan Buddhism. He is following Kyabje Dudjom Rinpoche, Kyabje Dilgo Khyentse Rinpoche, Kyabje Drubwang Pema Norbu Rinpoche, Kyabje Mindroling Trichen Rinpoche, and then finally Kyabje Trulshik Rinpoche, who died late last year."

Taklung Tsetrul Rinpoche was born in 1926 in central Tibet, near the famous Yamdrok Lake, and he was recognized as an incarnation of the great master Ngok Chöku Dorje. The prominent Dorje Drak affiliated Taklung Tse monastic center, the head of which he is considered to be, used to be located near his birthplace in Taklung region. He lived in exile in Simla, Himachal Pradesh and Ladakh, Jammu and Kashmir. He passed into parinirvana on December 23, 2015.

The four-year-old Nawang Tashi Rapten from the Spiti Valley has, in November 2022, been placed on the high seat as the successor to Taklung Tsetrul Rinpoche.
