= Tutikandi =

Neighbourhood in Shimla, Himachal Pradesh, India

- Neighbourhood
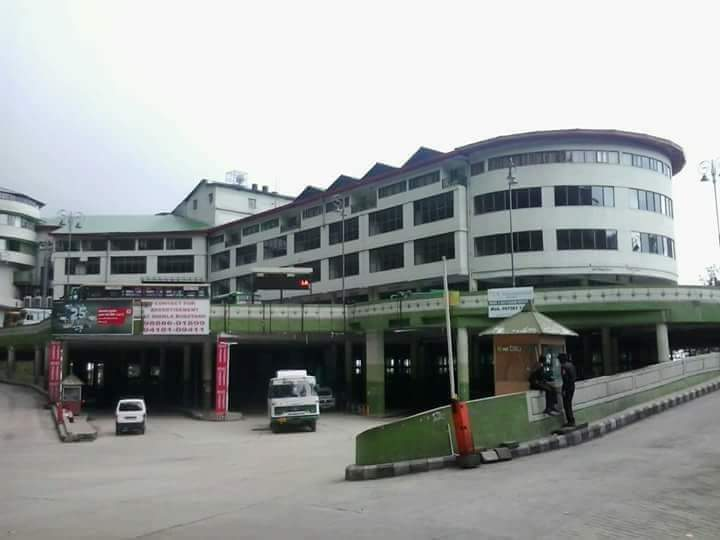
- ISBT Shimla in Tutikandi
- Location of Tutikandi in Shimla
- Coordinates: 31.096359°N 77.152866°E
- Country: India
- State: Himachal Pradesh
- City: Shimla
- Elevation: 1,729 m (5,673 ft)
- PIN: 171004

Tutikandi is a part of Shimla city, Himachal Pradesh, India. It has the main Inter State Bus Terminal of Shimla.

== Geography ==
Tutikandi is located along a section of National Highway 5 (India). The region is surrounded by trees of Deodar. The average altitude of Shimla is 2206 meters. It is 7 km from the nearby railway station. This small locality has developed since an Inter State Bus Terminal (ISBT) was added. The area was once out of the way of Shimla people. It has become a popular place well connected by roads. Though situated on the outskirts, the transport system, ISBT, makes the area easily reachable.

== History ==
Tutikandi was once an untouched part of Shimla. Dense, thick forest covers much of the region. For many years it served as a garbage dump. Its location was one major reason for choosing it as a dumping site. With the expansion the dumping site was relocated.

== Today ==
Tutikandi serves as a bypass road. Abattoir house is run by the municipal corporation of Shimla.

=== Sights ===
- Jalapu House is a traditional building of Shimla. It was constructed in the 1920s. This house belonged to a local farmer and was made with mud, stone and wood and covered with galvanized iron sheets.
- Old zoo is located in the dense forest. It has a mountain leopard as one of its residents.
- The 103 Railway Tunnel is a significant part of Shimla. The tunnel, which is often called a "ghost", is a few kilometers from the City.

== See also ==
- List of educational institutions in Shimla
