= Santokhgarh =

- Town
- Location in Himachal Pradesh, India Santokhgarh (India)
- Coordinates: 31.37°N 76.32°E
- Country: India
- State: Himachal Pradesh
- District: Una
- Founder: King Santokh Singh
- Elevation: 322 m (1,056 ft)

Population (2011)
  - Total: 8,308

Languages
  - Official: Hindi
- Time zone: UTC+5:30 (IST)
- Postal code: 174301

Santokhgarh is a town and a Municipal Council, nagar panchayat in Una district in the Indian state of Himachal Pradesh.

== Geography ==
Santokhgarh is located at 31.37°N 76.32°E. It has an average elevation of 322 metres (1,056 ft).

== People ==
The population is mainly a mix of Hindus and Sikhs, along with a small number of Muslims.

== Demographics ==
As of 2011 India census, Santokhgarh had a population of 8,308. Males constituted 51% of the population and females 49%. Santokhgarh has an average literacy rate of 68%, higher than the national average of 59.5%: male literacy is 74%, and female literacy is 62%. In Santokhgarh, 13% of the population is under six years of age.

== Temples ==
Santokhgarh has a number of temples, including Gurudwara Shaheeda Singhaa'n, Gurudwara Singh Sabha, Shri Baba Nanga Temple, temple of Vishvakarma, Shri Guru Ravidass Mandir, Gita Bhawan Mandir, Khawaja Mandir, Shani Dev Mandir, Hanuman Mandir, and Shiv Mandir.
