= 2023 Shimla Municipal Corporation election =

Municipal election in Shimla, Himachal Pradesh, India

- 2 May 2023

All 34 seats of the Shimla Municipal Corporation 18 seats needed for a majority
- Turnout: 58.97% (▲1.17%)
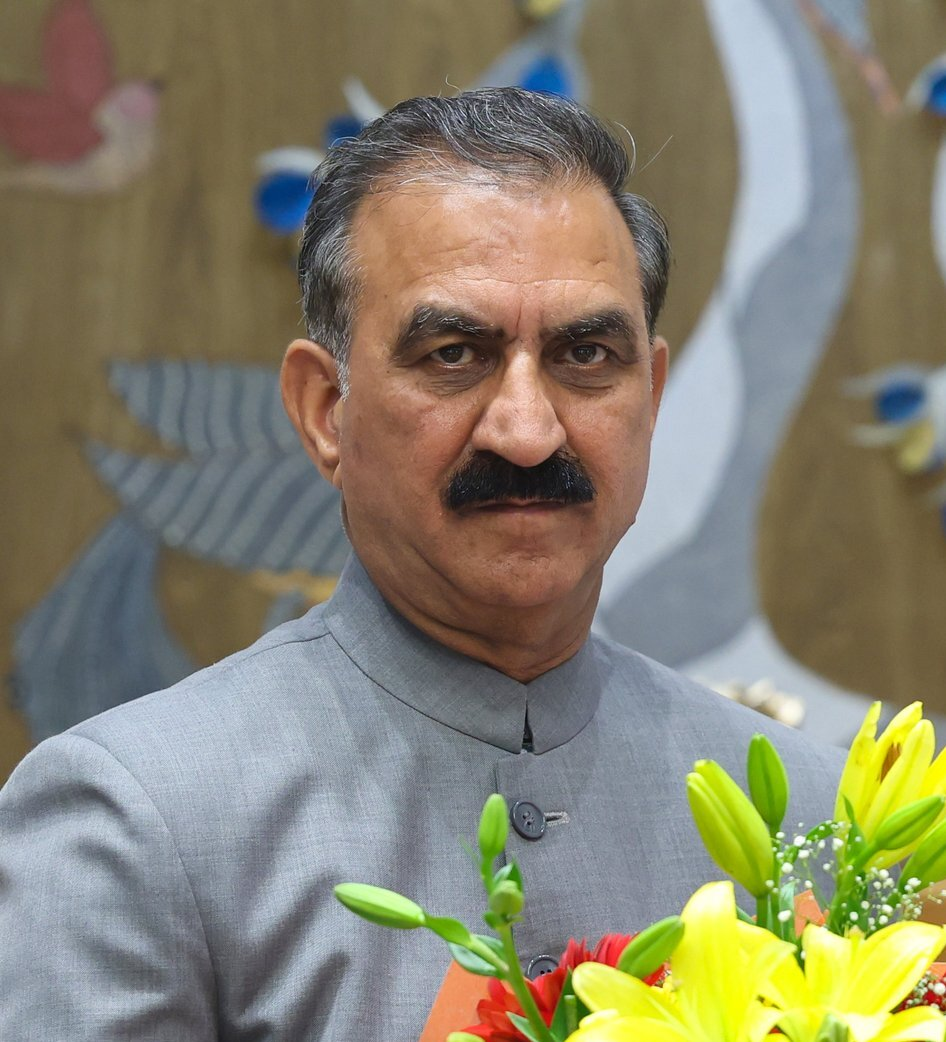

	Majority party	Minority party
Leader	Sukhvinder Singh Sukhu	Suresh Kumar Kashyap
Party	INC	BJP
Alliance	UPA	NDA
Leader since	2022	2020
Last election	12 seats	17 seats
Seats won	24 seats	9 seats
Seat change	▲12	▼8

The election to the Shimla Municipal Corporation was held on 2 May 2023.Votes were counted and results declared on 4 May 2023.

== Schedule ==
Poll Event	Schedule	Day
Issue of notification of election	3 April 2023	Monday
Last Date for filing nomination	18 April 2023	Tuesday
Scrutiny of Nominations	19 April 2023	Wednesday
Withdrawal of Candidature	21 April 2023	Friday
Date of Poll	2 May 2023	Tuesday
Date of Counting	4 May 2023	Thursday
Date of Completion	6 May 2023	Saturday

== Parties and alliances ==
=== Bharatiya Janata Party ===
No.	Party	Flag	Symbol	Leader	Seats Contested
1.	Bharatiya Janata Party			Suresh Kumar Kashyap	34

=== Indian National Congress ===
No.	Party	Flag	Symbol	Leader	Seats Contested
1.	Indian National Congress			Sukhvinder Singh Sukhu	34

=== Communist Party of India (Marxist) ===
No.	Party	Flag	Symbol	Leader	Seats Contested
1.	Communist Party of India (Marxist)			Onkar Shad	4

=== Aam Aadmi Party ===
No.	Party	Flag	Symbol	Leader	Seats Contested
1.	Aam Aadmi Party			Anoop Kesari	21

== Result ==
Results were announced on 4 May 2023. Indian National Congress swept the election by winning 24 seats.

=== Results by Party ===
24	9	1
INC	BJP	CPI(M)

Parties		Seats		
Parties		Contested	Won	+/-
Indian National Congress		34	24	▲12
Bharatiya Janata Party		34	9	▼8
Communist Party of India (Marxist)		4	1	Steady
Aam Aadmi Party		21	–	Steady
Independent	–	9	–	▼4
Total		102	34	–
