= Mehatpur Basdehra =

Mehatpur
- Town, Sub Tehsil
- Location in Himachal Pradesh, India Mehatpur (India)
- Coordinates: 31.4092529°N 76.3400459°E
- Country: India
- State: Himachal Pradesh
- District: Una

Population (2011)
  - Total: 9,218

Languages
  - Official: Hindi
- Time zone: UTC+5:30 (IST)
- Postal code: 174315

Mehatpur Basdehra is a town and a Nagar Parishad Sub Tehsil in the Una District of the Indian state of Himachal Pradesh.

== Demographics ==
At the time of the 2011 India census, Mehatpur Basdehra had a population of 9218. Males constituted 53% of the population and females 46%. Mehatpur Basdehra had an average literacy rate of 85.46%, higher than the state average of 82.80%: male literacy was 88.85% and female literacy 81.55%. 11.11% of the population was under 6 years of age.
