= Dorje Drak =

Tibetan Buddhist monastery in Shannan, Tibet, China

- Tibetan transcription(s); Tibetan: རྡོ་རྗེ་བྲག་དགོན་པ། Wylie transliteration: rdo rje brag dgon pa
- Location within China

Religion
- Affiliation: Tibetan Buddhism

Location
- Location: Lhoka (Shannan) Prefecture, known as U-Tsang
- Country: China
- Coordinates: 29.353°N 91.132°E

Architecture
- Founder: Ngari Panchen Pema Wangyal (1487-1582)

Dorjidak Gompa (Tibetan: རྡོ་རྗེ་བྲག་དགོན་པ།, Wylie: rdo rje brag dgon pa "Indestructible Rock Vihara") or Tupten Dorjidak Dorjé Drak Éwam Chokgar (Tibetan: ཐུབ་བསྟན་རྡོ་རྗེ་བྲག་རྡོ་རྗེ་བྲག་ཨེ་ཝཾ་ལྕོག་སྒར་, Wylie: thub bstan rdo rje brag rdo rje brag e waM lcog sgar) is a Tibetan Buddhist monastery and one of the Nyingma school's "Six Mother Monasteries" in Tibet. It is located in the Lhoka (Shannan) Prefecture in the south of the Tibet Autonomous Region, older southeastern Ü-Tsang.

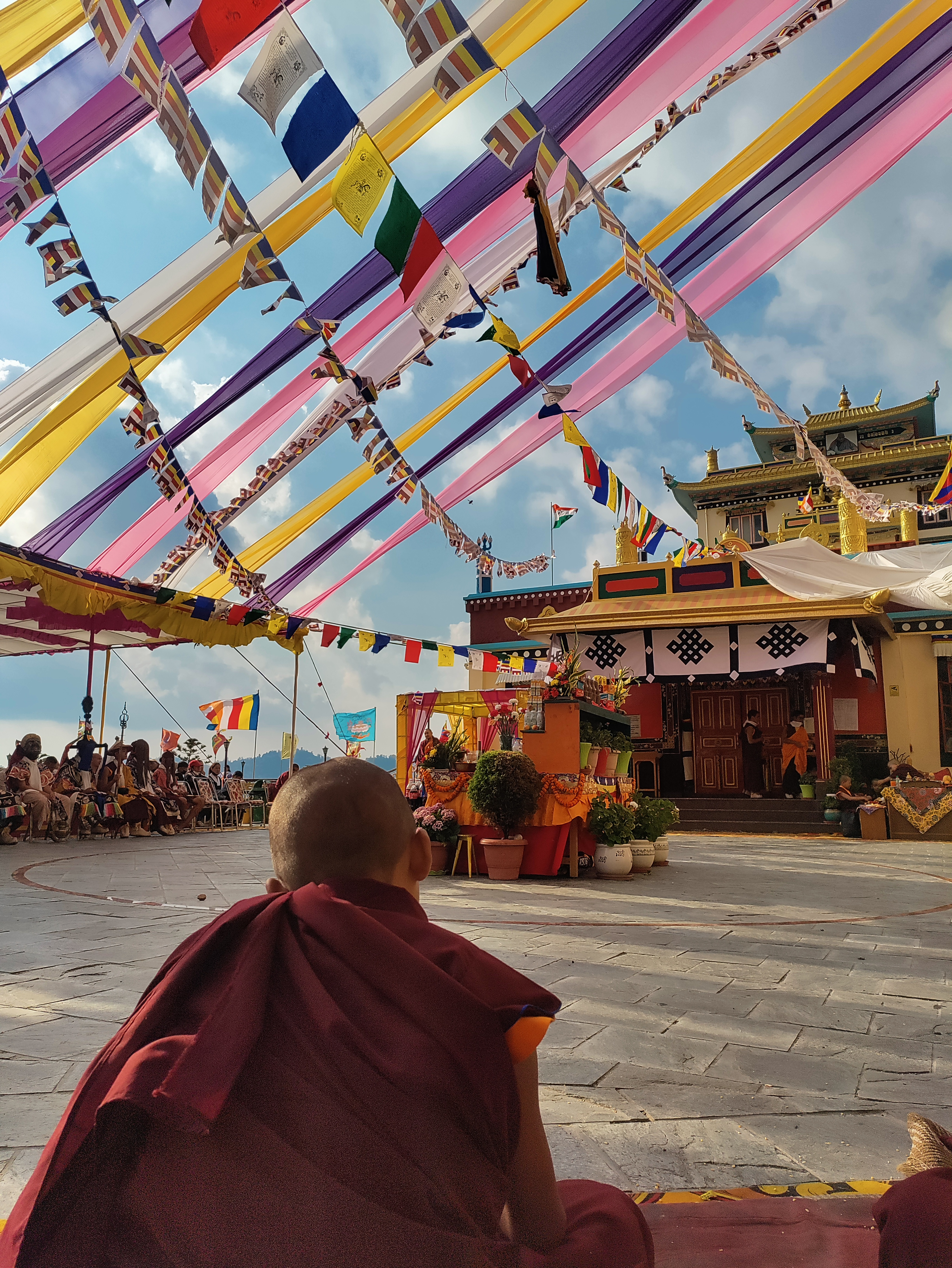
The Dorje Drak Monastery in Shimla

Dorje Drak is also the name of the monastery built to replace it in Shimla, India after the original was destroyed during the Battle of Chamdo. It is now the seat of the throne-holder of the monastery and the tradition. Along with Mindrolling Monastery it is one of the two most important Nyingma monasteries in the region of Ü.

== History ==
The earlier name of Dorje Drak was Ewam Chogar Gompa, built by Ngari Panchen Pema Wangyal (1487-1582). It was enlarged by Pema Wangyal's tulku Jangdag Tashi Tobgyal Wangpode (1550-1602). Jangdag Wangpode's son was the first Rigdzin Ngaggi Wangpo and also the third lineage holder. The two earlier incarnations and lineage holders were entitled Rigdzin in honor of the reestablishment of the monastery in 1630-1632 by Ngaggi Wangpo.

At the monastery's relocation site, a footprint of Padmasambhava (Pad-ma ‘byung-gnas), also known as Guru Rinpoche, was found on the rock mountain behind the monastery, along with a naturally formed crossed vajra. Considered auspicious, it led to the addition of "Indestructible Rock" to the monastery's founding name: Ewan Chogar Gompa became Thubten Dorje Drag Ewam Chogar, known of as Dorje Drak. Another Sister Monastery, Katok Monastery also was located on a naturally occurring crossed vajra.

In 1632 the monastery relocated from Tsang to its present tranquil setting on the north bank of the Brahmaputra, when the young Third Rigdzin Ngagiwangpo and his guardian Jangdak Tashi Topgyel were forced to flee the wrath of the kings of Tsang. Their successor, the erudite Fourth Rigdzin Pema Trinle (b. 1641) greatly enlarged the monastery before his untimely death at the hands of the Dzungar Mongolians, who sacked the monastery in 1717.

Rebuilding began in 1720, under patronage of the 7th Dalai Lama, Kelzang Gyatso. However, when Kelzang Pema Wangchuk, The Fifth Dorje Drak Rigdzin (1719/20-1770/71) was enthroned as the monastery's third throne holder, its buildings were still lying mostly in ruins.

The Sixth Dorje Drak Rigdzin, Kunzang Gyurme Lhundrub (d. 1808?) is remembered for "building and maintaining the monastery." He "gave teachings, commissioned numerous objects of faith, sponsored the printing of scriptures, and emphasized the study of the Jangter and other traditions' texts."

Later, during the 1960s the monastery was again obliterated. Nonetheless it has been gradually restored in recent years through the efforts of the present incarnation of Dordrak Rigdzin, who lives in Lhasa, and those of Kelzang Chojor and the local community.

The book, Tibet Overland says, "... destroyed again by the Red Guards in the 1960s. The existing structure was gradually rebuilt and restored from the mid-1980s. Up until the Cultural Revolution (...) approximately 400 monks studied at Dorje Drak."

"The monastery specialized in the Northern Treasures (Tib. བྱང་གཏེར་, changter; Wyl. byang gter) tradition of Rigdzin Gödem". It had approximately 200 monks before the Chinese invasion.

=== Former incarnations ===
- Rigdzin Gödemchen Ngodrub Gyeltsen (1337-1409), a treasure revealer of Jangter, the Northern Treasures.
- Lekden Dudjom Dorje (1512-1625), the younger brother of Ngari Panchen Pema Wanggyel, with whom he built Ewan Chogar Gompa that became Dorje Drak. He was also the teacher of Changdak Tashi Tobgyal.

=== Throne holders (Dorje Drak Rigdzin) ===
- Rigdzin Ngakgi Wangpo (1580-1639)
- Rigdzin Pema Trinlé (1641-1717)
- Kalzang Pema Wangchuk (1719/20-1770/71) - born in Chagdud
- Kunzang Gyurme Lhundrup Dorje (17th century - 1808?)
- Ngawang Jampal Mingyur Lhundrup Dorje (1810?/1839-1844?/1861)
- Kalzang Pema Wangyal Düdul Dorje (1848-1880)
- Thupten Chöwang Nyamnyi Dorje (1884/6-1932/5)
- Thupten Jikmé Namdrol Gyatso (b. 1936)

== Dorje Drak Gompa (Jingangsi) ==
This monastery at the southern end of the city of Kangding (Dartsedo) in Eastern Kham (Ganzi Prefecture) is a branch of the Dorje Drak monastery in Central Tibet. It was destroyed in 1959 before the Cultural Revolution, but the Chanting Hall (the main temple), in which there is a large statue of Guru Rinpoche (Padmasambhava), and Jokhang have been restored.

== In exile ==
As the original monastery was destroyed after the Chinese invaded Tibet, a new monastery was founded by Taklung Tsetrul Rinpoche in 1984 in Panthaghati, Shimla, Himachal Pradesh, India, modeled after the original Dorje Drak monastery in Tibet. It is called Thupten Dorje Drak Ewam Chogar Chökhor Namgyal Ling.

The current throne holder is Taklung Tsetrul Rinpoche or known as Shedup ninche thinley palzangpo who also accepted the position of Head of the Nyingma sect on 22 March 2012.
