= Lower Bazaar, Shimla =

Neighbourhood and Market in Shimla, Himachal Pradesh, India

Lower Bazaar
- Neighbourhood, Market
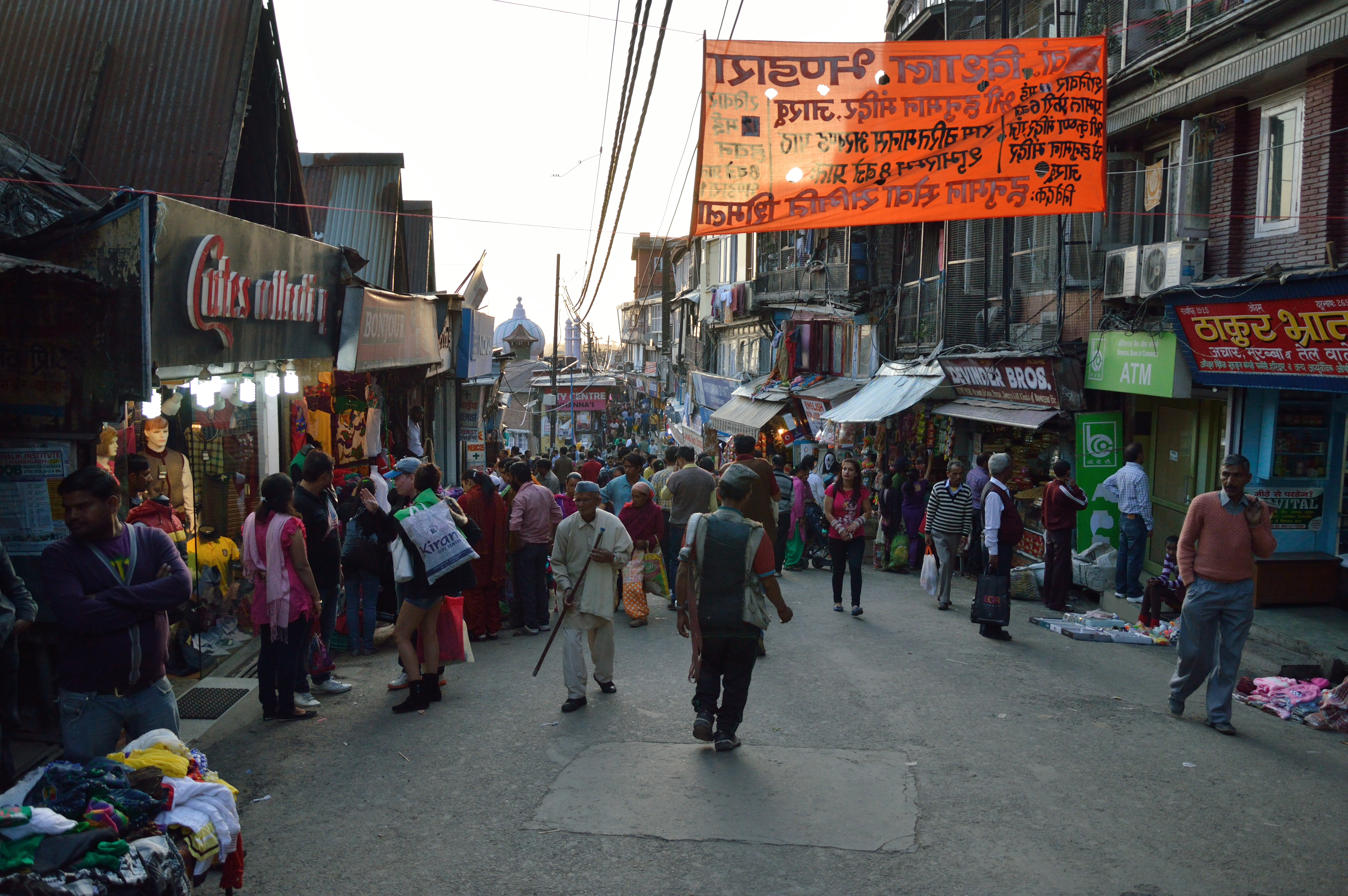
- Lower Bazaar shops
- Location of Lower Bazaar in Shimla
- Coordinates: 31.103828°N 77.173475°E
- Country: India
- State: Himachal Pradesh
- District: Shimla

Dimensions
  - Length: 0.7 km (0.43 mi)
- PIN: 171001

Lower Bazaar is a market in Shimla city. It is just below the Middle Bazaar and Mall Road. The market is popular among locals. The market has diverse range of shops such as clothing and restaurants.

== History ==
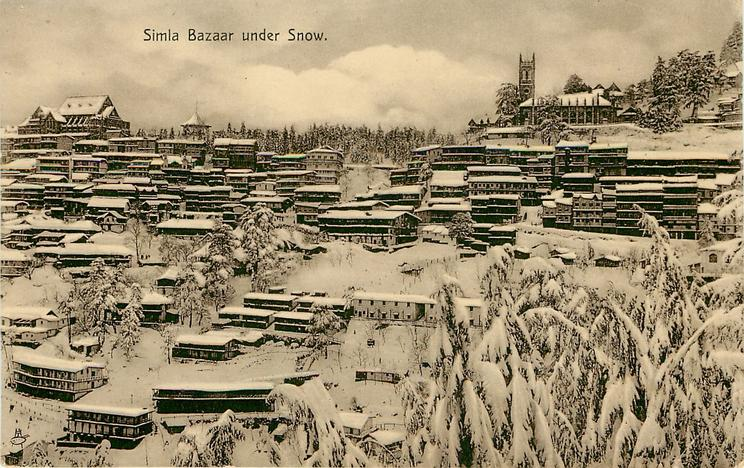
Lower Bazaar in 1917, photo clicked from Circular Road

The Lower Bazaar was settled by the British for local Indians. The Britishers did not allow Indians in Upper Bazaar (Mall Road), which is why Lower Bazaar was created. Shimla Municipal Corporation has declared parts of the bazaar as no-vending zones, which has provoked angry reactions from shopkeepers.

== Location and transportation ==
Lower Bazaar is located in the center of Shimla. The area is a no vehicle zone, only ambulances and Municipal Corporation vehicles are allowed.

== Commodities ==
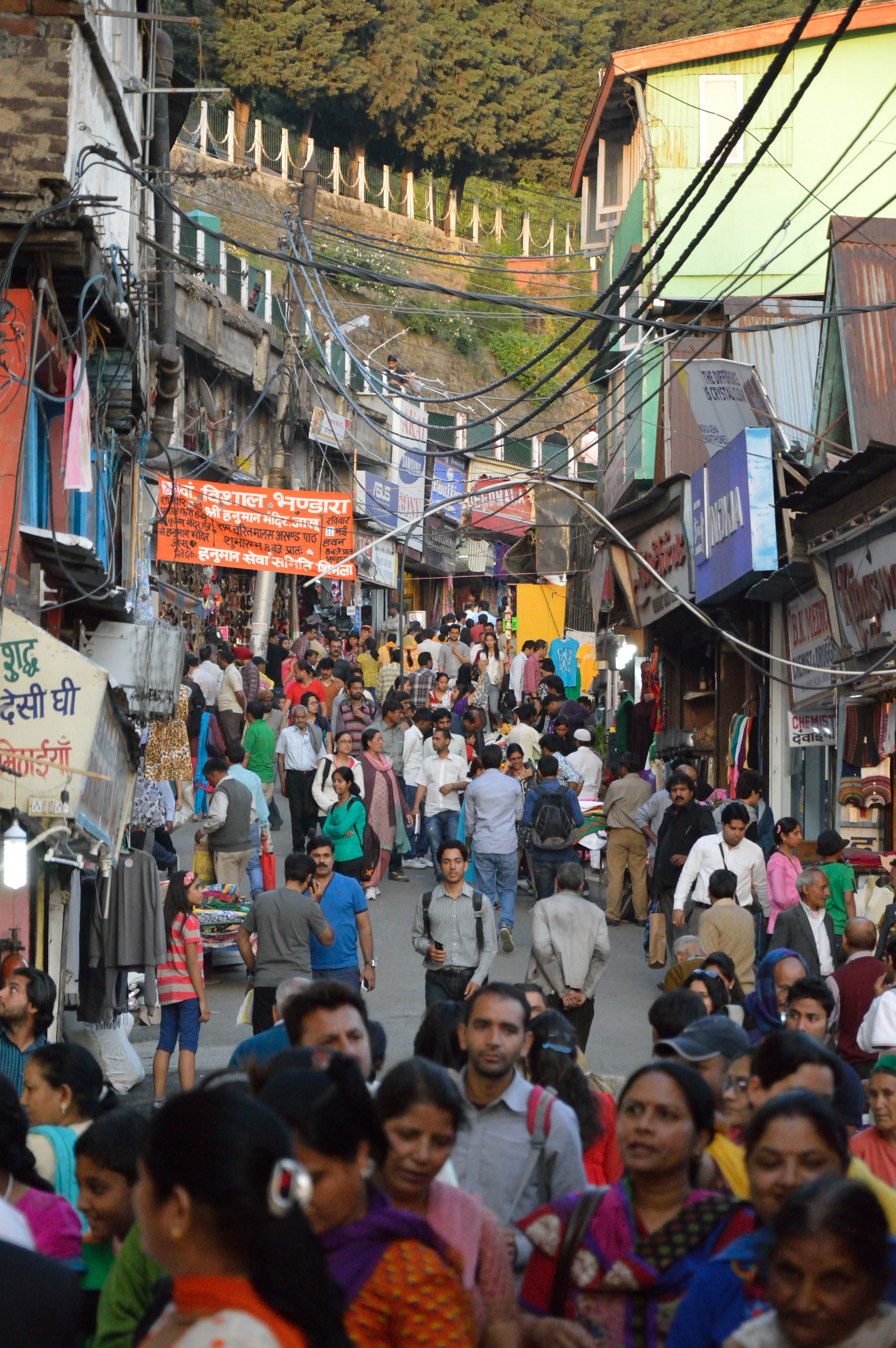
People shopping in Lower Bazaar

The Bazaar sells household items, jewellery, stationary, and toys. It also contains many restaurants and dhabas.
