= Himachal Pradesh Police =

Indian state police force

- Common name: HP Police
- Abbreviation: H.P.P.
- Motto: "निर्भय निष्पक्ष सत्यनिष्ठ".

Agency overview
- Annual budget: ₹1,645 crore (US$180 million) (2025–26est.)

Jurisdictional structure
- Operations jurisdiction: Himachal Pradesh, India
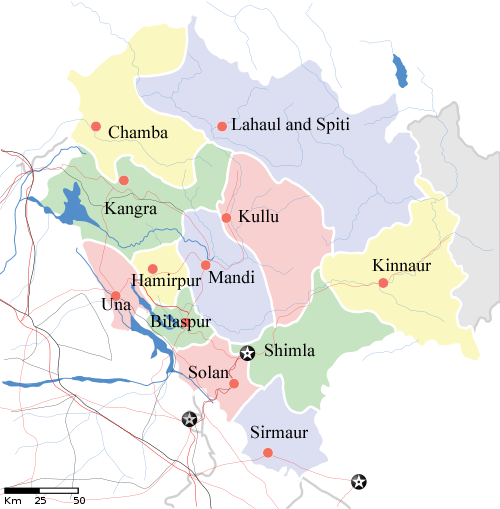
- Jurisdiction of Himachal Pradesh Police
- Legal jurisdiction: State of Himachal Pradesh
- Governing body: Department of Home (Himachal Pradesh)
- Constituting instrument: Police Act, 1861
- General nature: Local civilian police

Operational structure
- Headquarters: Police Headquarters, Nigam Vihar, Chotta Shimla, Shimla
- Minister responsible: Sukhvinder Singh Sukhu, Chief Minister of Himachal Pradesh and Minister of Home and Confidential
- Agency executive: Ashok Tiwari (acting), Director General of Police

Website
- hppolice.gov.in

The Himachal Pradesh Police is the law enforcement agency for the state of Himachal Pradesh in India. It has its state headquarters at Nigam Vihar, Chotta Shimla in Shimla and 12 district headquarters in the state.

== History ==
Himachal Pradesh as political entity came into existence on 15 April 1948.

It was constituted by integrating the princely States of Chamba, Mandi, Suket, Sirmaur and 26 smaller states known as the Punjab Hill States.

Subsequently, in 1954 Bilaspur, which was then a part "C" State, was also merged with Himachal Pradesh. In 1960, District Kinnaur was carved out of District Mahsu which was earlier constituted by merging 27 hill states.

After the re-organization of Punjab in 1966, Shimla, Kangra, Kullu, Lahaul & Spiti Districts, Una Tehsil of Hoshiarpur District, and Nalagarh Tehsil of Ambala District were also merged with the Union Territory of Himachal Pradesh.

In 1972, Districts of Kangra and Mahasu were reorganized. District Kangra was trifurcated and Una and Hamirpur Tehsils were made into separate Districts. Some areas of Mahasu District were merged with Shimla District while the others formed the new District of Solan.

In 1948, states like Mandi, Chamba, Sirmaur, Suket and Bilaspur had their regular Police forces. Other smaller states had a common Police Force. The Rulers of Punjab Hill States, with the exception of Sirmaur and Bilaspur, realized the advantage of establishing a common system of Policing in their States. The system was adopted as an experiment for three years from 1 April 1943.

This was, in the true sense, the beginning of Himachal Pradesh Police. For proper administration of the scheme, an executive committee, consisting of five members was constituted. Four members of this committee were elected by the rulers from amongst themselves. The fifth member was nominated by the political agent of the Punjab Hill States to represent such states which may be under his direct administration due to minority of the rulers or for other reasons.

The committee elected one of them as its chairman. In order to ensure proper administration of police work, an officer of the status of Supdt. of Police in British India was appointed. He had the authority to exercise general supervision over the police cadre in these states.

In 1948, after the constitution of the Union Territory, efforts were made to stream line the police force in the state to bring it at par with other forces of the India Union. The police force drawn from different states having varying backgrounds and traditions were amalgamated to form the H.P. Police.

== Organizational structure ==
Himachal Pradesh Police comes under direct control of Department of Home Affairs, Government of Himachal Pradesh. The Himachal Pradesh Police is headed by Director General of Police (DGP). The Training college of Himachal Pradesh Police is situated at Daroh (Palampur).

== List of Police Training Institutions of Himachal Pradesh ==
List of Police Training Institutions
Sr No.	Police Training Institutions
1	Police Training College, Daroh District Kangra, HP
2	Ist IRBn Bangarh, Training School
3	2nd IRBn Sakoh, Training School
4	3rd IRBn Pandoh, Training School

== Crime Statics in Himachal Pradesh ==
Year	Murder	Culpable homicide	Attempt to Murder	Rape	Kid/ Abd	Dowry death	Cruelty to Women	Molestation	Hurt	Rioting	Accident	Theft	Burglary	Dacoity	Robbery	Other IPC	ND & PS Act	SC/ST Act	PCR	Excise Act	Forest Act	IT Act	Other L & S Laws	Total
2020	91	7	71	332	344	1	258	539	687	446	2236	347	275	2	8	9154	1538	222	4	2819	169	91	989	20630
2021	85	8	69	359	429	2	222	488	588	341	2408	475	292	3	8	7271	1537	224	1	2969	130	55	869	18833
2022	86	11	73	358	414	1	196	501	605	381	2592	670	491	0	8	6846	1516	195	1	311	100	5	834	19053

== Ranks of law enforcement in India ==
The ranks, posts, and designations of all police officers vary from state to state as law and order is a state matter. But generally, the following pattern is observed:

Gazetted Officers

Indian Police Service cadre officers rank insignia
Insignia
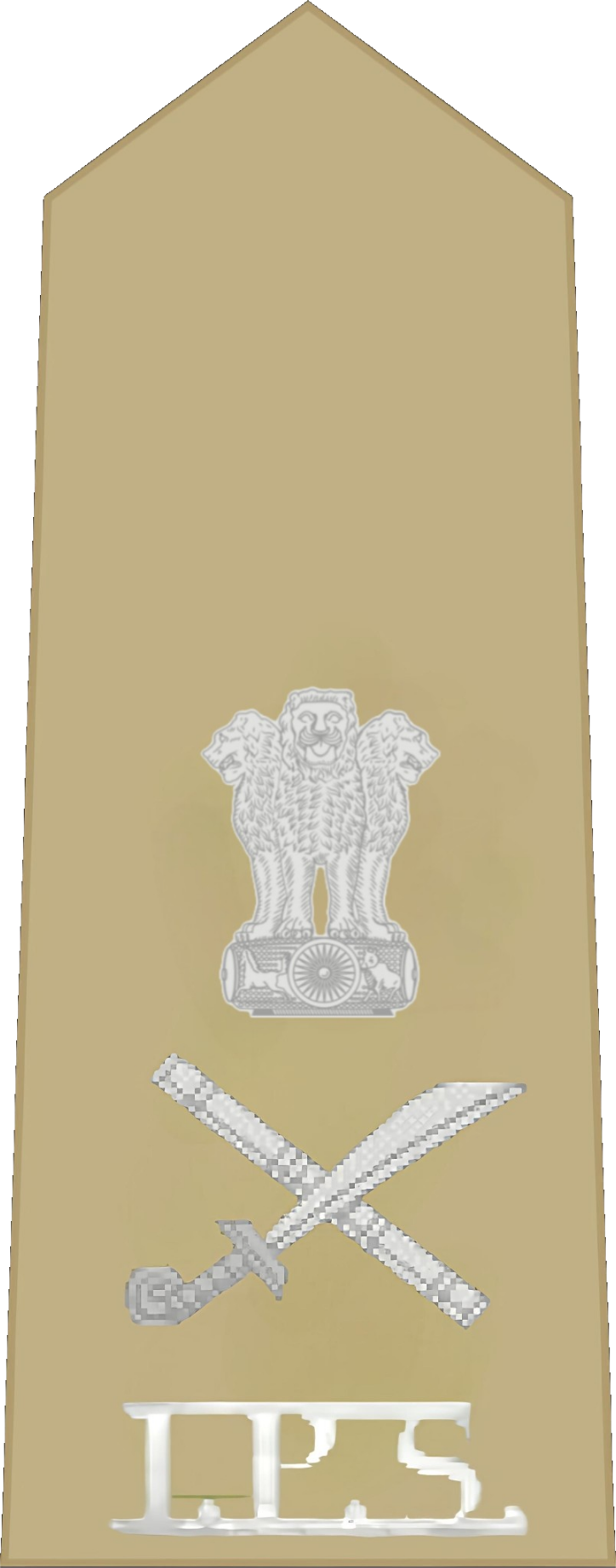
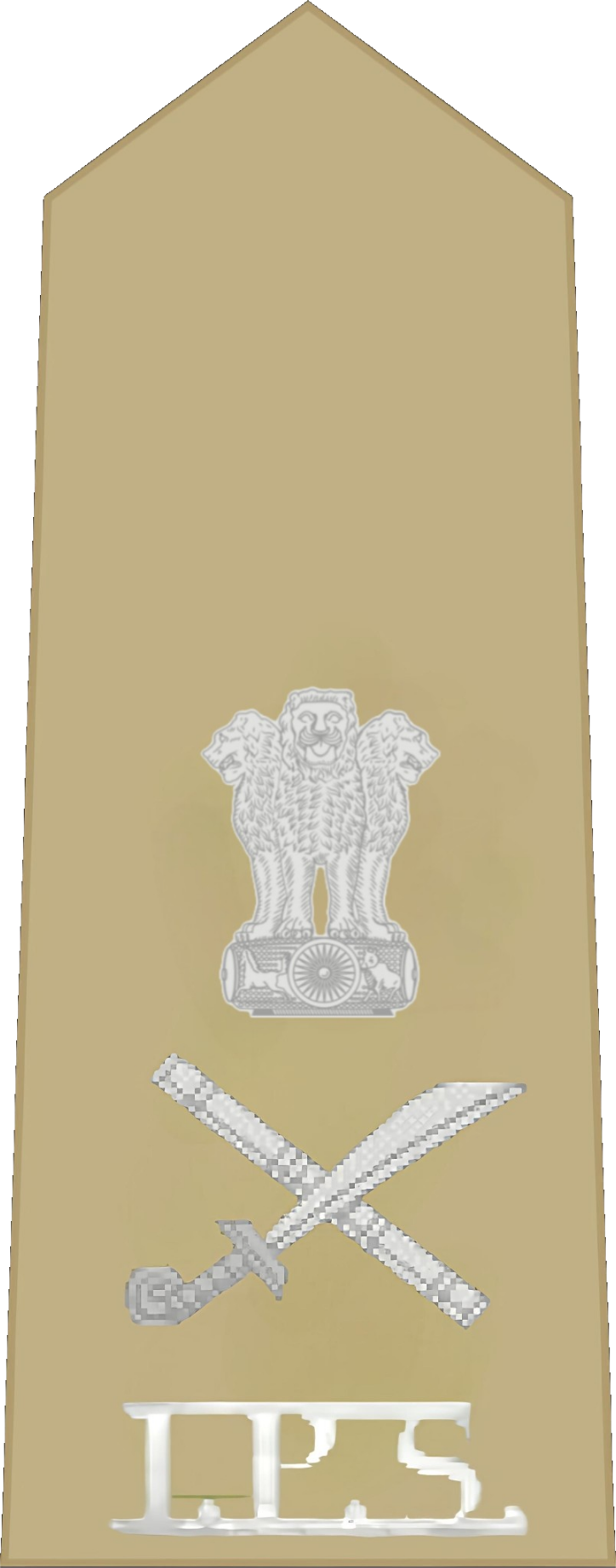
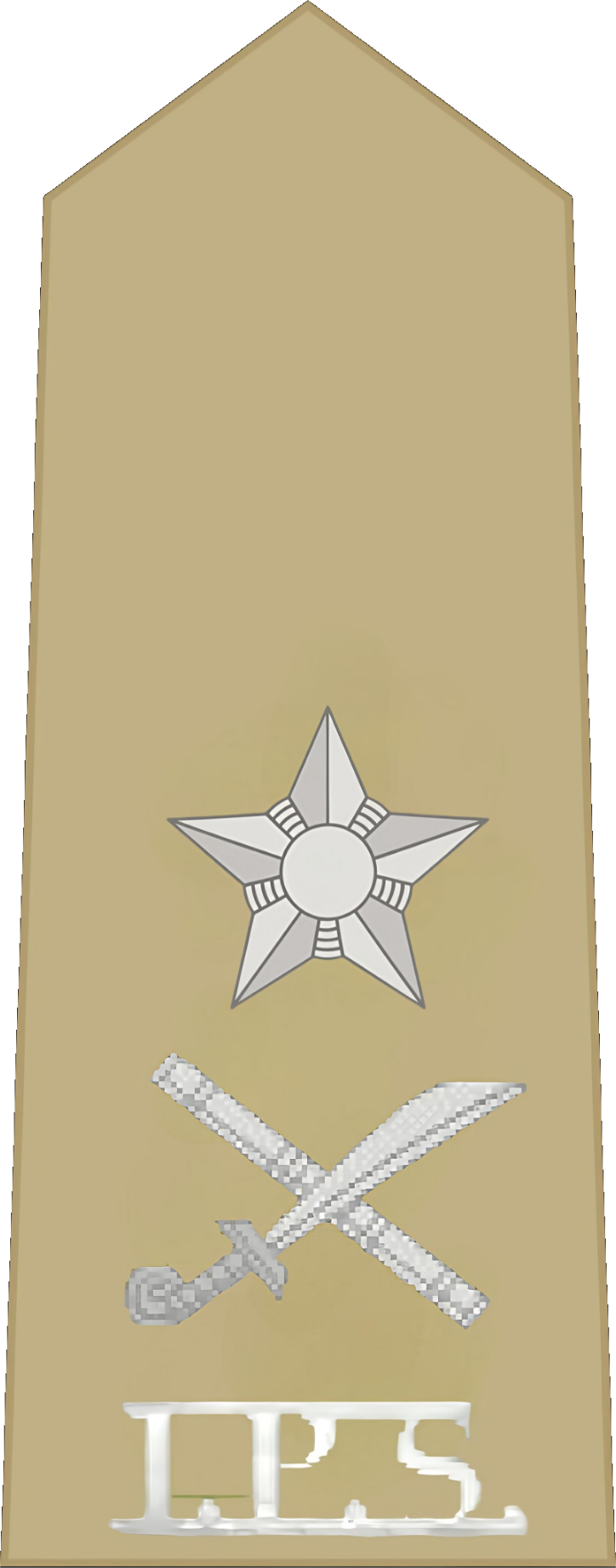
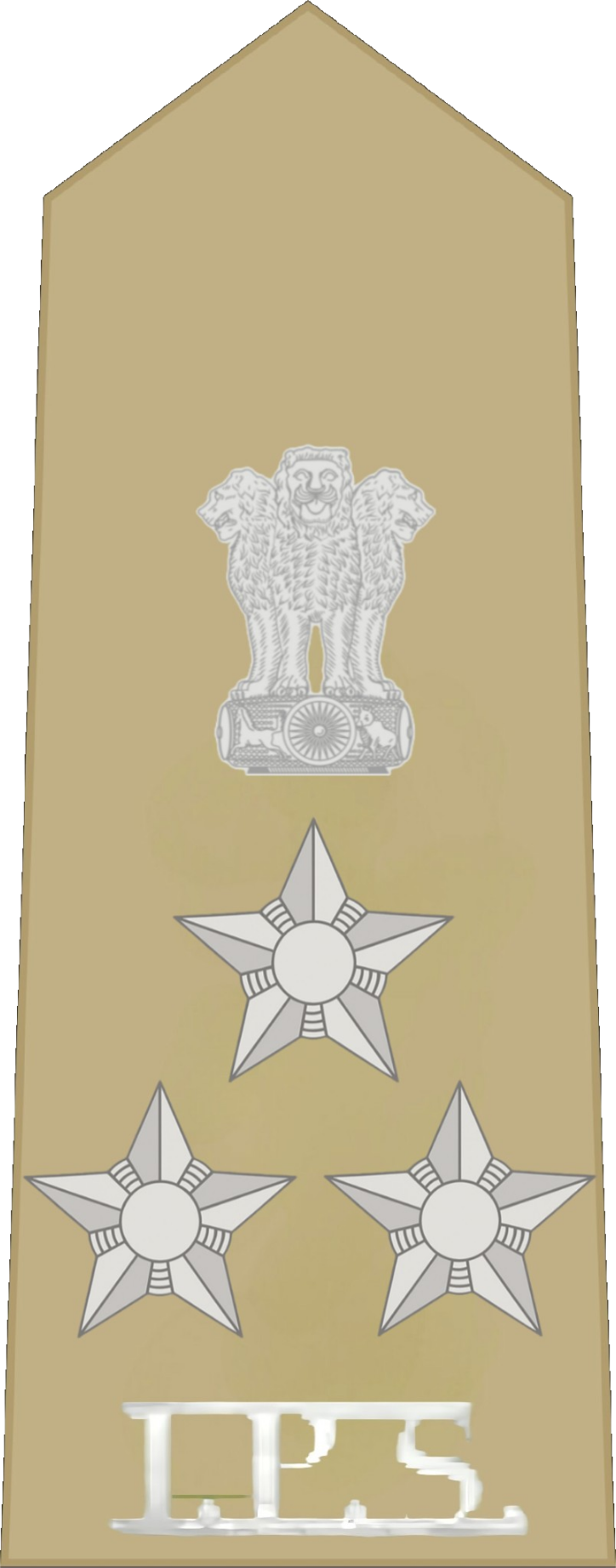
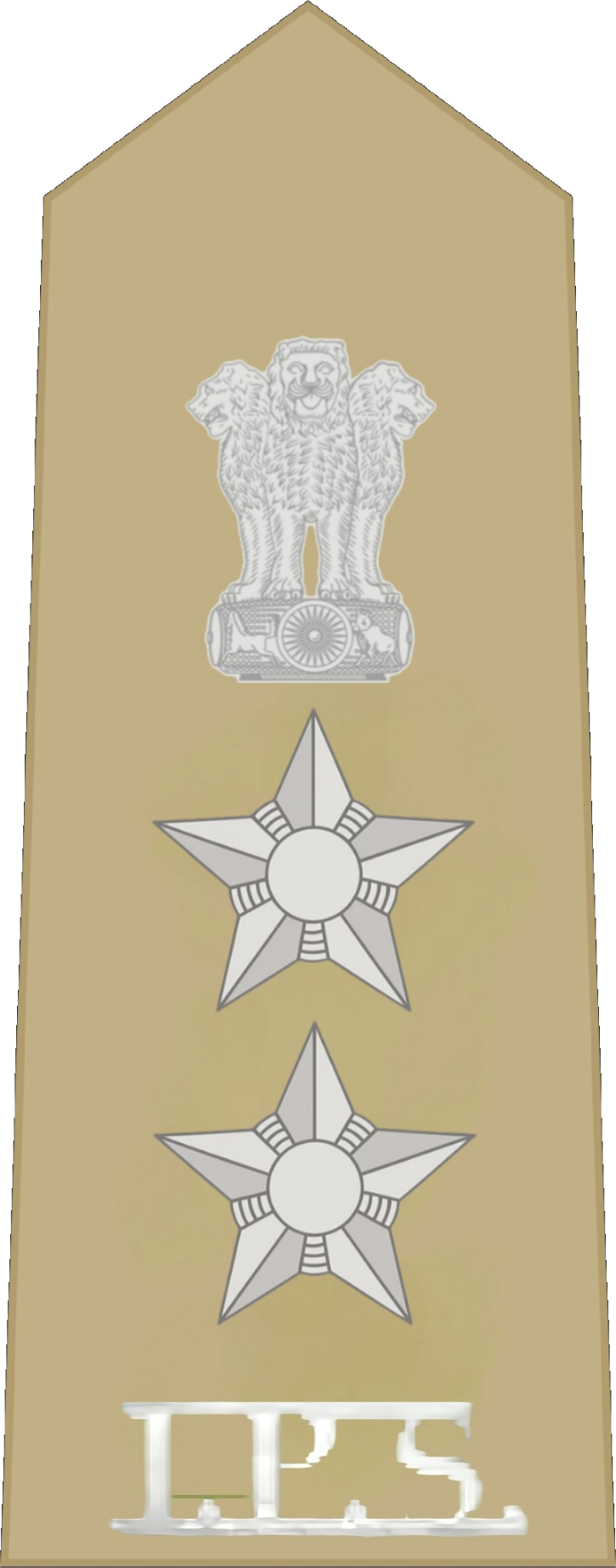
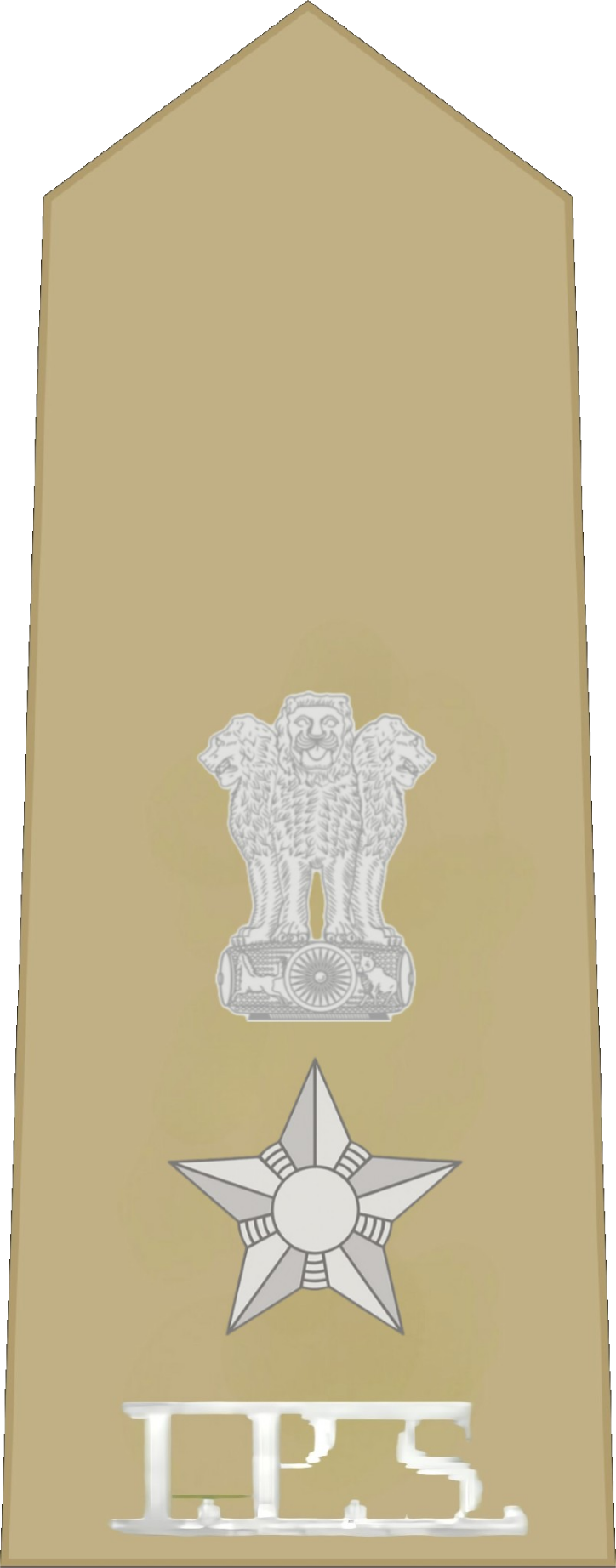
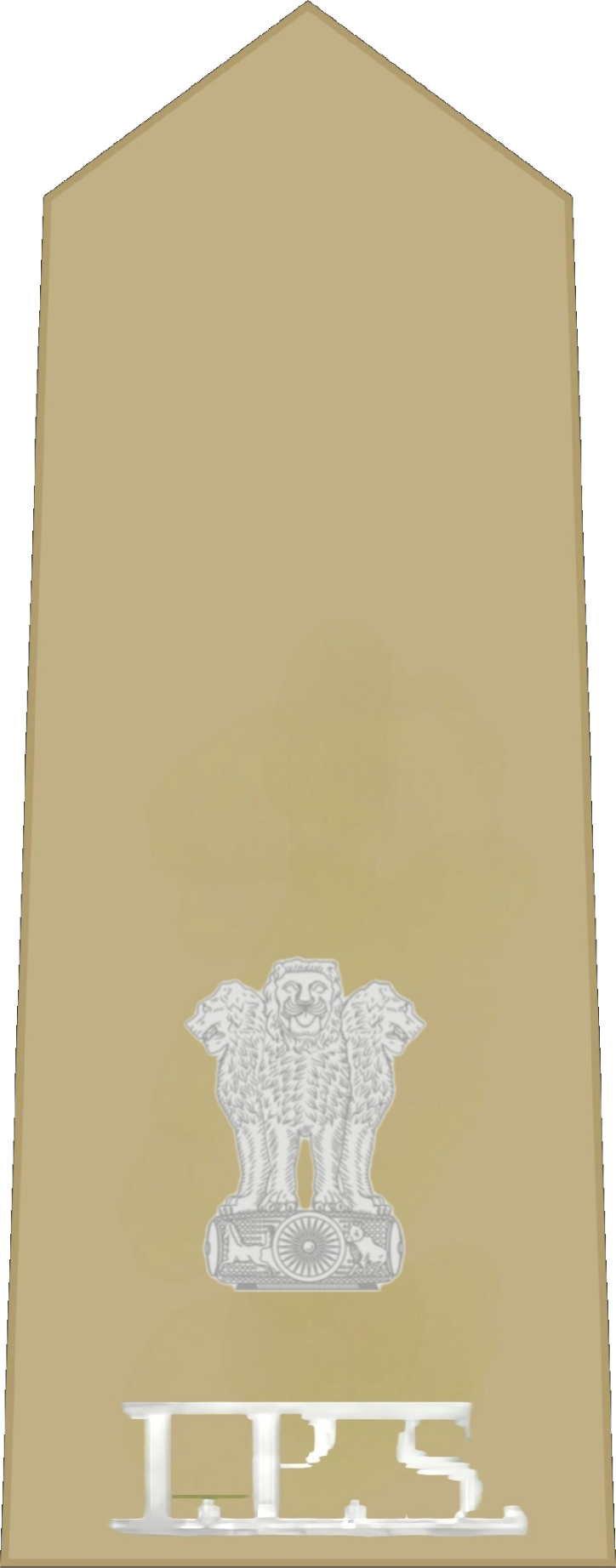
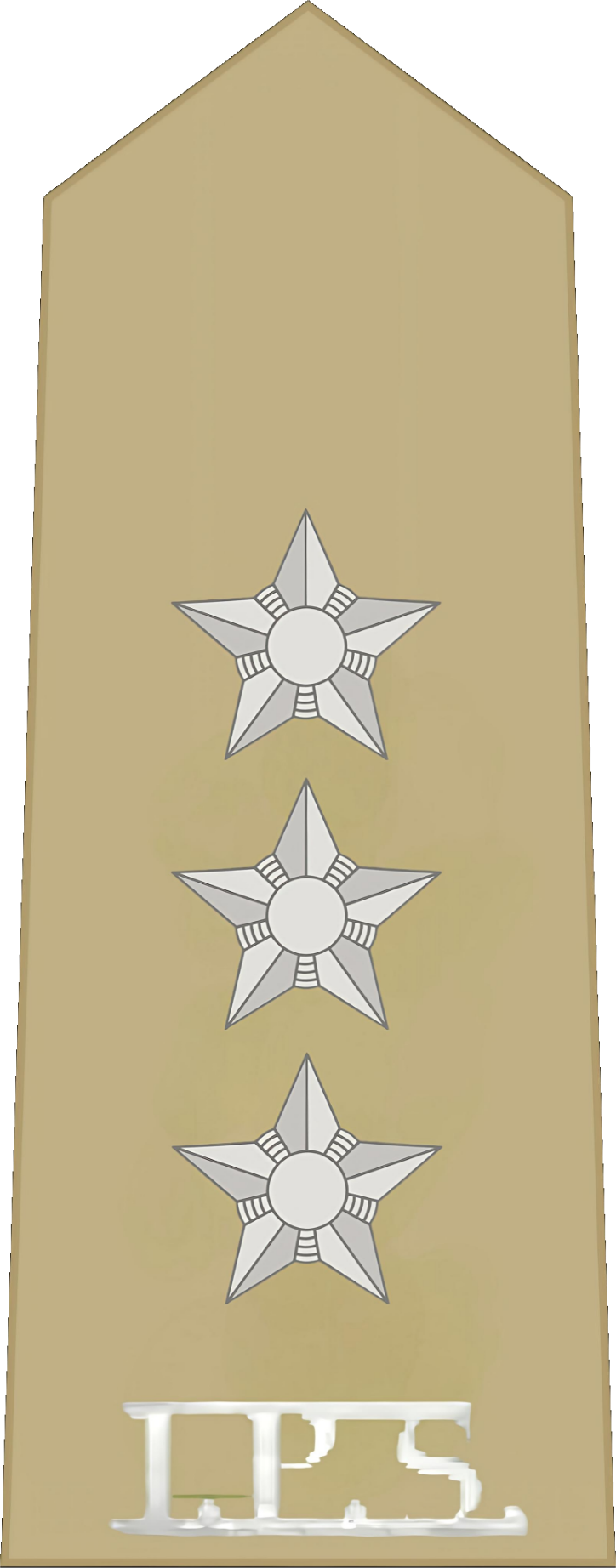
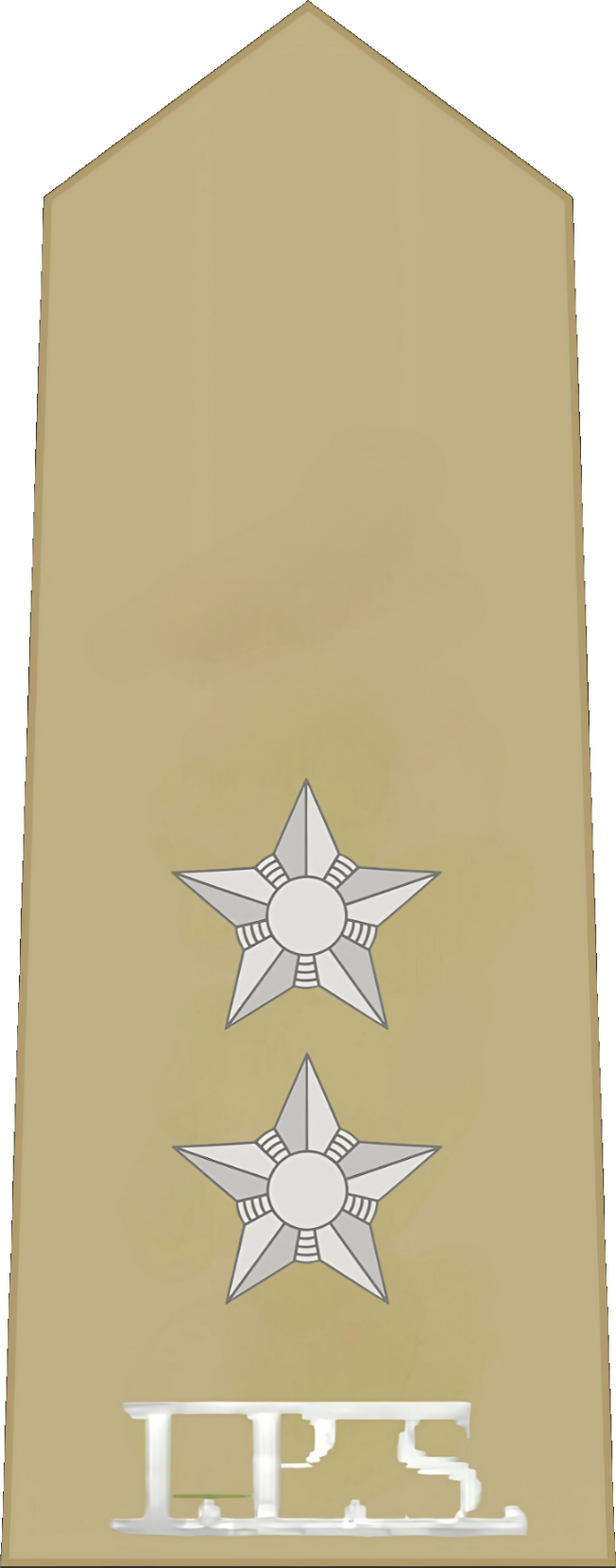
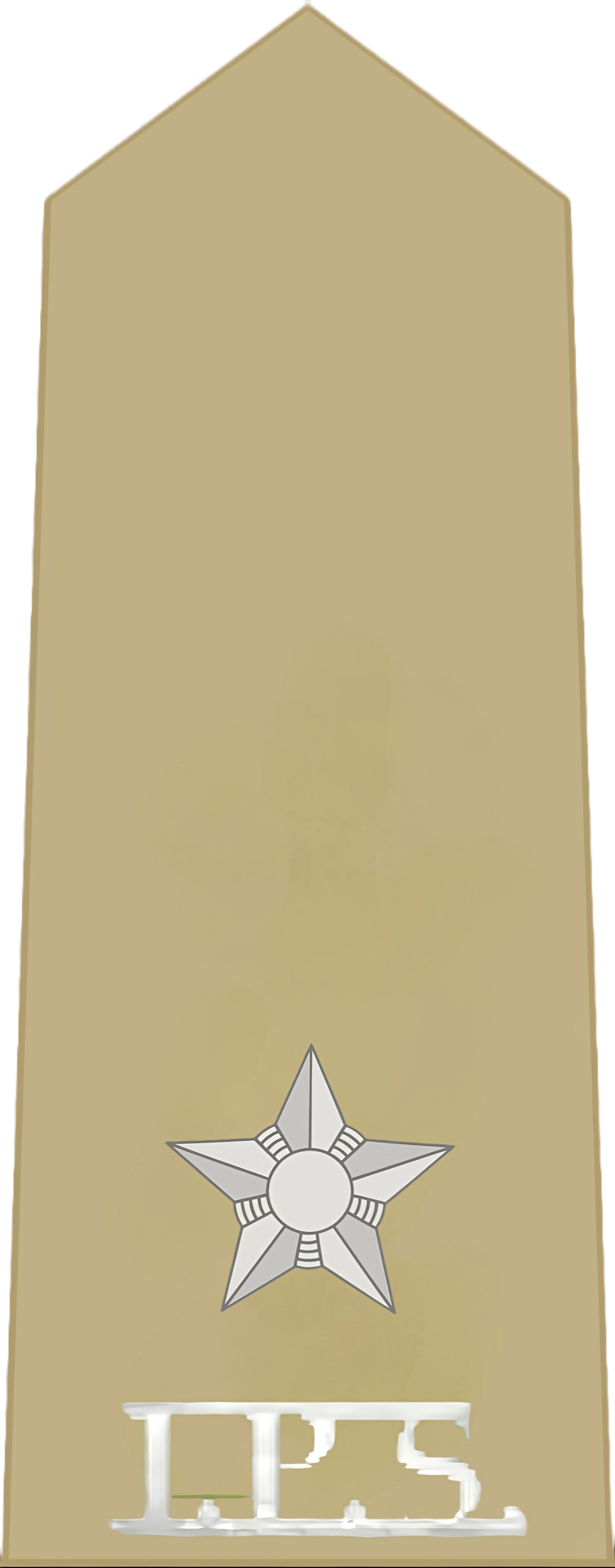
Rank
Director General of Police
Additional Director General of Police (Note: Rank insignia of DGP is similar to Additional DGP.)
Inspector General of Police
Deputy Inspector General of Police
Superintendent of Police (Selection Grade) (Note: The Senior Superintendent of Police (SSP) is a post, not a rank, typically held by an SP (selection grade or junior grade) in states like Uttar Pradesh, Jammu and Kashmir, and Punjab.)
Superintendent of Police
Additional superintendent of police
Assistant Superintendent of Police
Assistant superintendent of police (Probationary for two years)
Assistant Superintendent of Police (Probationary for one year)
Abbreviation
DGP
ADGP
IGP
DIGP
SP (SG)
SP
Addl.SP
ASP
ASP
ASP

- Note 1: The rank insignia of DGP, Spl.DGP, Addl.DGP is the same.
- Note 2: The equivalent rank to the ASP (Asst.SP) in State Police Services is the deputy superintendent of police (DSP/DySP).
- Note 3: The commissioner of police is a post typically held by DIG and above rank officers.

Non-gazetted officers

Indian Police non-gazetted officers rank insignia
Insignia
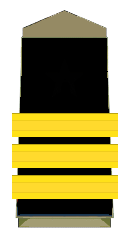
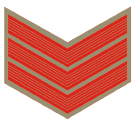
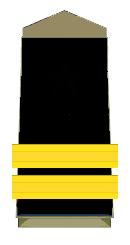
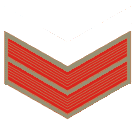
No insignia
Rank
Inspector of Police
Inspector / Circle Inspector (Note: Inspector or Circle Inspector with One Five-Pointed Star insignia exists in West Bengal Police.)
Assistant Police Inspector (Note: This rank exists only in the Maharashtra Police.)
Sub-Inspector
Sergeant (Kolkata Police)
Assistant Sub-Inspector
Head Constable (Note: Shoulder insignia rank only used in the Maharashtra Police.)
Senior Constable (Note: This rank is also known as senior constable, constable grade-I, and exists only in some state police forces.)
Police constable
Abbreviation
INSP
INSP / CO
API
SI
Sgt
ASI
HC
SC
PC

- The rank of Sergeant is used in India only in the Bihar Police and the Kolkata Police
- The One Five Pointed Star for the rank of Inspector is used by Police forces of 7 states viz. West Bengal, Jharkhand, Bihar, Sikkim, Assam, Nagaland and Tripura. This is because Inspectors of Police in these 7 states are Gazetted Officers. However, the Kolkata Police uses the Four Pointed Star of the Order of Bath for the ranks of Inspector and Assistant Commissioner of Police instead of Five Pointed Star. For the ranks of ASI, SI/Sergeant and Deputy Commissioner of Police, the usual Five Pointed Star is used
- Colour pattern and size of chevrons may vary according to the different rules of several distinct Indian State Police services.

== Transport of Himachal Pradesh Police ==
Vehicle	Origin	Illustration
Royal Enfield 350/500	India	
Hero Splendor	India	
TVS Apache	India	
Mahindra Scorpio	India	
Mahindra Jeep	India	
Maruti Suzuki SX4	India, Japan	Grey sedan, seen from the front
Toyota Innova	Japan, India	Grey crossover vehicle
Tata Xenon	India	
Toyota Fortuner	Japan, India	Another white SUV
Honda Civic	Japan, India	White sedan, seen from the front
Toyota Corolla	Japan, India	Light-coloured sedan
Tata Sumo	India	
Hindustan Ambassador	India	Older-looking white sedan
Maruti Gypsy	Japan, India	White jeep
Mahindra Bolero	India	Nizamabad City Police Patrol vehicle Mumbai Police Patrol vehicle UP Police Dial 100 vehicle Chennai City Police Mobile Patrol
Tata 407	India	
Tata bus	India	

== Weapons and equipment of Himachal Pradesh Police ==
Name	Weapon	Type	Caliber	Origin	Notes
Handguns
Beretta 92		Semi-automatic pistol	9×19mm Parabellum	Italy	Standard issue firearm
Pistol Auto 9mm 1A		Semi-automatic pistol	9×19mm Parabellum	India	Standard issue firearm
Glock 17		Semi-automatic pistol	9×19mm Parabellum	Austria	Standard issue firearm
IOF .32 revolver		Revolver	7.65mm x 23mm	India	Standard issue firearm
Sub-Machine Gun
SAF Carbine 2A1		Submachine gun	9×19mm Parabellum	India	Phasing out and being replaced by MSMC
Heckler & Koch MP5		Submachine gun	9×19mm Parabellum	Germany	Used mainly by Police SWAT
Assault Rifle/ Battle Rifles
Ishapore 2A1 rifle		Bolt-action	7.62 NATO	India	Being phased out, mainly retain for ceremonial purpose, still employed by Forest Departments
315" Sporting Rifle		Bolt-action	8 mm (.315")	India	Mainly employed by Forest Departments
12 Bore Double barrel shotgun		Double barrel shotgun	12-gauge	India	Mainly employed by Forest Departments
L1A1 Self-Loading Rifle		Semi-automatic rifle	7.62×51mm NATO	UK	Being phased out
AKM		Assault rifle	7.62×39mm	Soviet Union	
1B1 INSAS		Assault rifle	5.56×45mm NATO	India	Mainstay of police force
Light Machine Gun
GUN MACHINE 7.62MM IA		Light machine gun	7.62 x 51 mm NATO	India	Being phased out

== Services ==
Himachal police have another online services like Online Traffic Challan, FIR, Complaints Registering services on their Official website.
