= Killar =

- town
- Location within Himachal Pradesh Location within India
- Coordinates: 33.083°N 76.398°E
- Country: India
- State: Himachal Pradesh
- District: Chamba
- Elevation: 2,600 m (8,500 ft)

Population
  - Total: 18,000

Languages
  - Official: Hindi
- Time zone: UTC+5:30 (IST)
- PIN: 176323

Killar or Kilar is a town in Himachal Pradesh, India. It is the headquarters of Pangi Tehsil in Chamba district.
