= Mall Road, Shimla =

Major hangout and shopping centre in Shimla

Mall Road
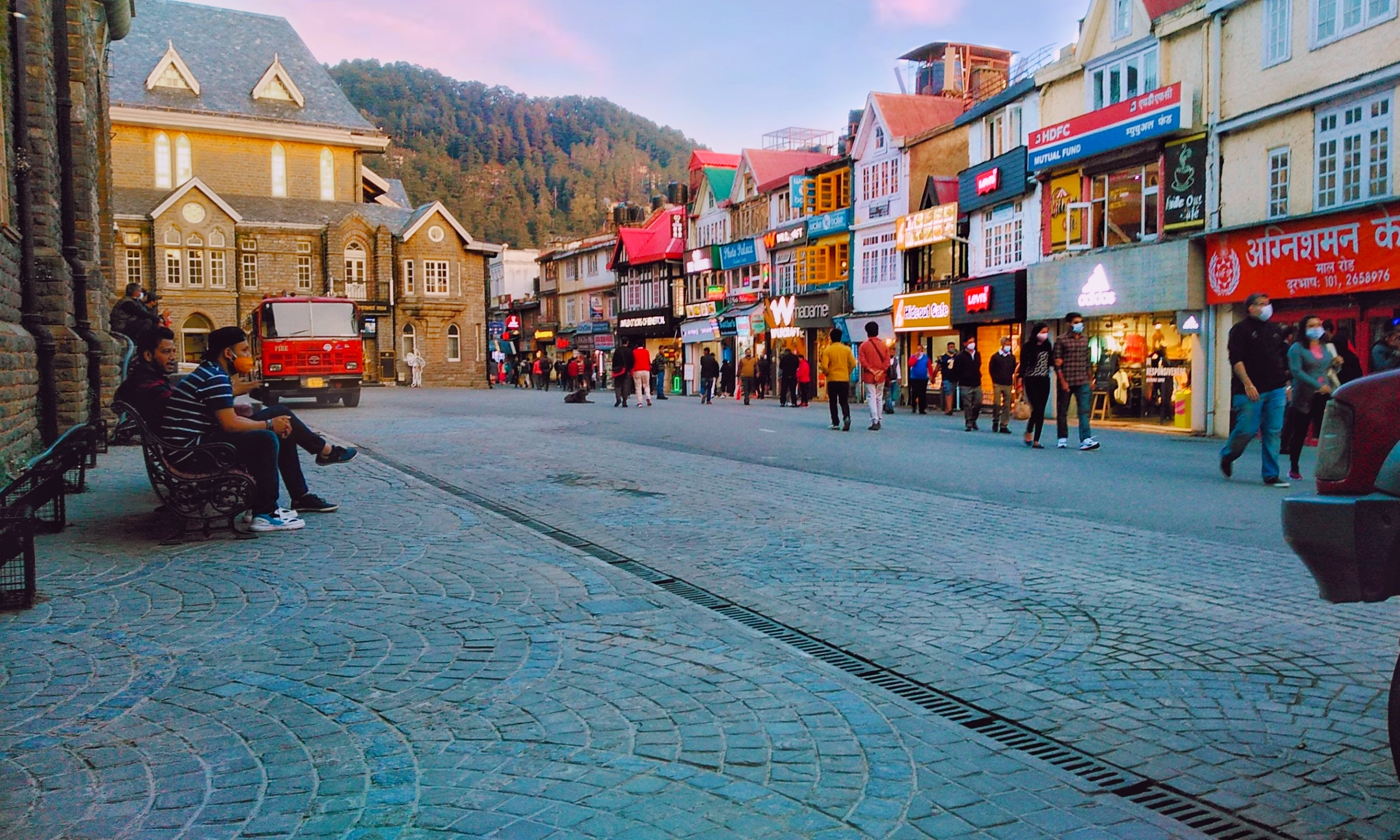
- Mall Road
- Interactive map of Mall Road
- Type: Shopping street
- Length: 1 km (0.62 mi)
- Restrictions: No vehicles allowed
- Location: Shimla, Himachal Pradesh, India
- Coordinates: 31.105°N 77.172°E

Mall Road is one of the main financial, commercial and business centres in Shimla, the capital city of Himachal Pradesh, India. Constructed during British colonial rule, the Mall road is located a level below The Ridge. The offices of municipal corporation, fire service and police headquarters are located here. Automobiles, except emergency vehicles are not allowed on this road. Another popular shopping centre of the city is Lower Bazaar, which is just below the Mall Road.

Mall Road has a number of showrooms, department stores, shops, restaurants and cafes. A Himachal emporium that offers handicraft products of Himachal Pradesh like locally designed woollen clothes, branded clothes, pottery items, wooden products, and jewellery is also located here.

== Attractions ==
=== Scandal Point ===
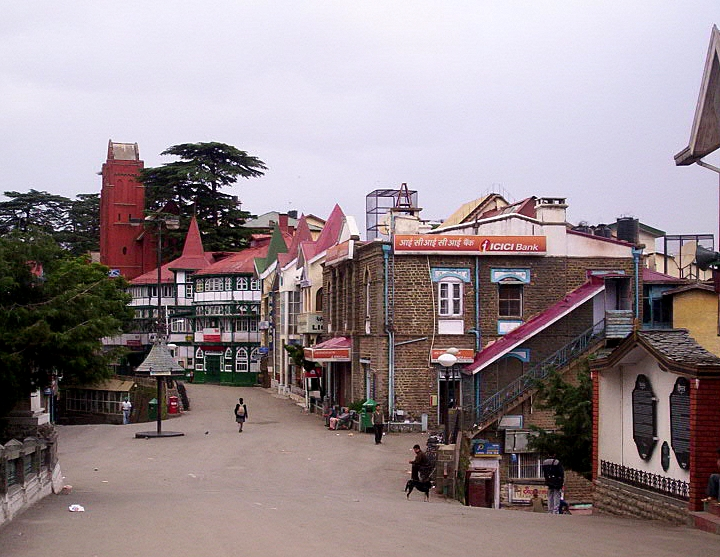
Scandal Point, as seen from the Ridge, Shimla

Scandal Point is where The Mall joins The Ridge on the west side. The name arose from the commotion caused by the supposed elopement of a British lady with an Indian maharaja. The story goes that the Maharaja of Patiala had eloped with the daughter of the British Viceroy. This had led to the Maharaja being banished from entering Shimla by the British authorities. He countered the move by setting himself a new summer capital – now famous hill resort of Chail, 45 km from Shimla. The most prominent feature of the point today is a statue of the Indian freedom fighter Lala Lajpat Rai (no relation to the scandal). Next to Scandal Point is General Post Office.

=== The Gaiety Theatre ===
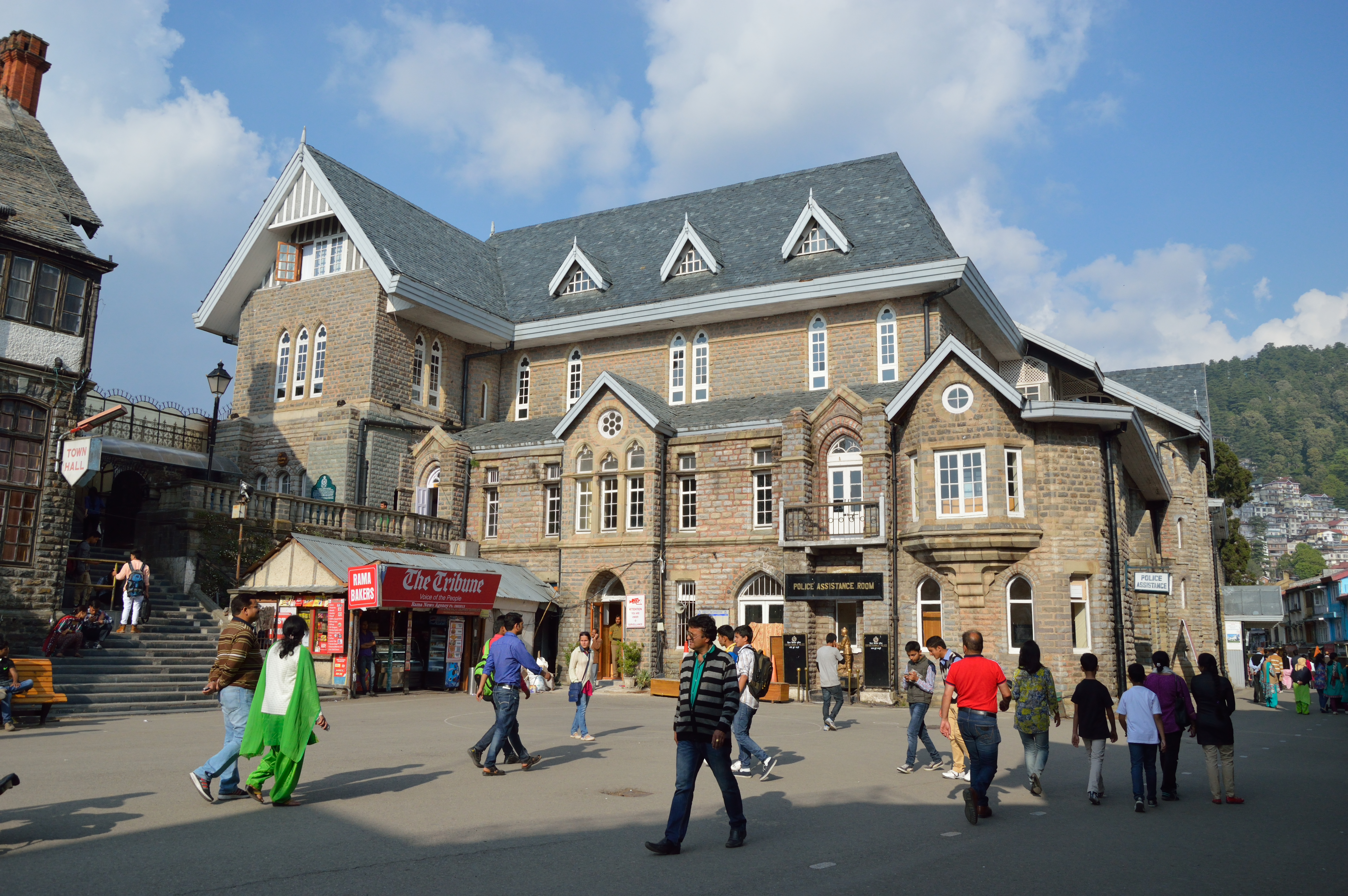
Gaiety Theatre

The Gaiety Theatre, located on the Mall, was opened on 30 May 1887. Many popular film personalities have performed on its stage.
Today, the Gaiety is primarily known for its social club. Schools in Shimla use this theatre for performing arts. The theatre has been renovated, with the original structure untouched to keep its heritage preserved while making it more attractive.

=== Kali Bari Temple ===
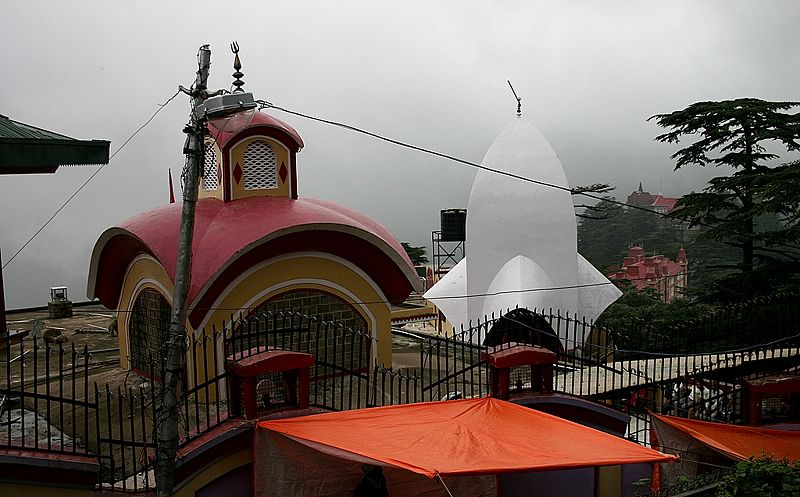
Kali Bari Temple from uphill

The Kali Bari temple was built in 1823 by the Bengali surveyors from Calcutta (capital of at that time) working in the British Indian government to make Simla the summer capital. It is dedicated to the goddess Kali. It is believed that in an ancient temple of Shimla, the goddess Kali existed, near Jakhoo. In the temple a wooden image is worshiped locally.

=== Town Hall ===
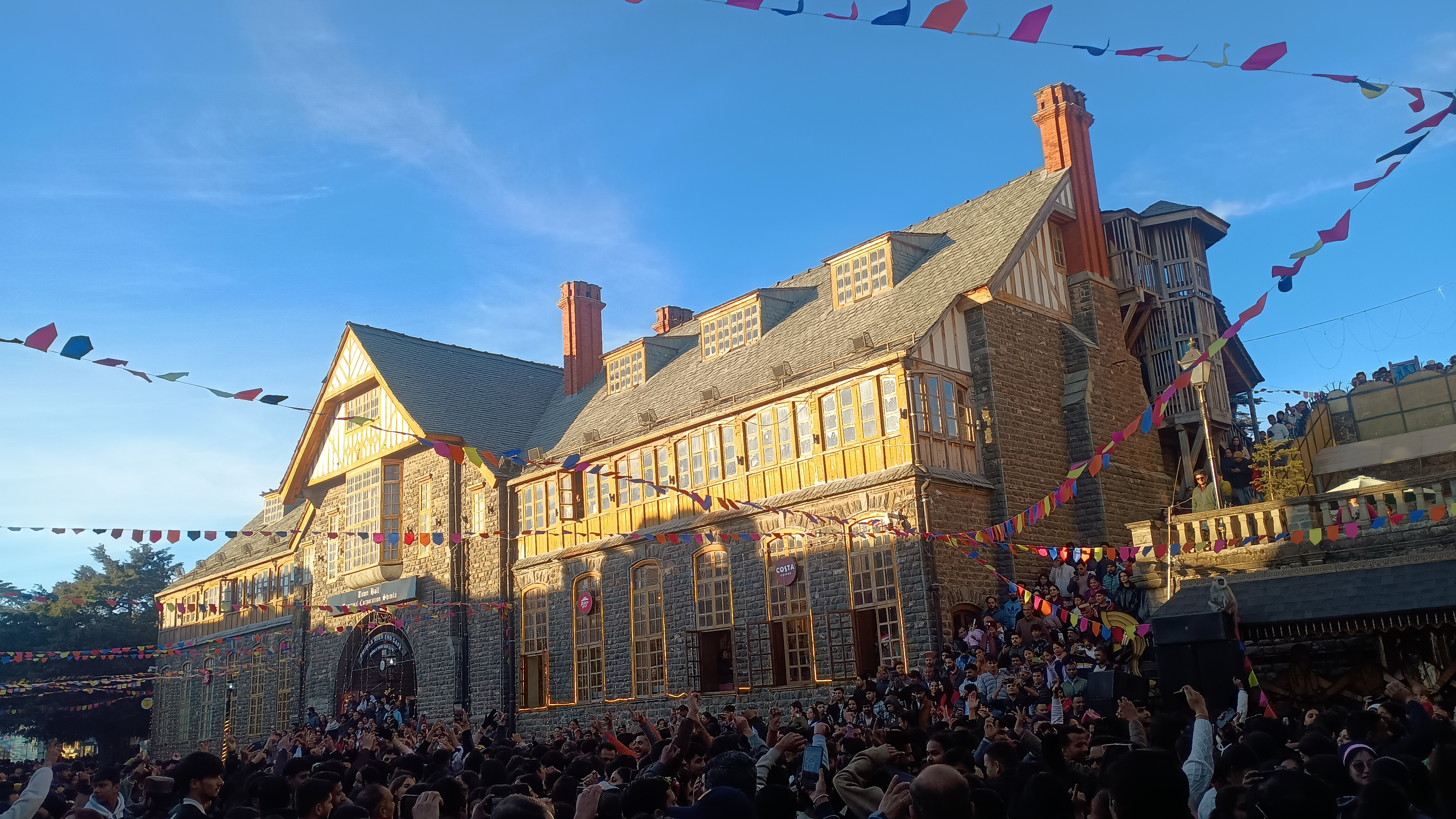
Town Hall during Shimla Winter Carnival, 2025

The Town Hall was constructed in 1908 and was designed by the Scottish architect James Ransome. The building has been the centre of municipal activities since the beginning and it currently houses the Shimla Municipal Corporation. The building adds to the surrounding architecture, reminiscent of the pre-independence era. The large steps and the entrance to this building are a common site for pictures depicting the Mall at Shimla. A project was started in 2014 to restore the building to its original look and more than 8 crore rupees were spent in renovating this colonial architectural marvel.
