= List of districts of Himachal Pradesh =

Districts of Himachal Pradesh

The northern Indian state of Himachal Pradesh is divided into 12 districts, the Revenue department of which is headed by a Deputy Commissioner or District Magistrate, an officer belonging to the Indian Administrative Service. The district magistrate or the deputy commissioner is assisted by a number of officers belonging to Himachal Administrative Service and other Himachal state services.

== District administration ==
A District Judge serves as the head of the Judiciary of the district. Courts subordinate to him include those of the Civil Judges, Senior Civil Judges, and Judicial Magistrates.

A Superintendent of Police, an officer belonging to the Indian Police Service is entrusted with the responsibility of maintaining law and order and related issues of the district. He is assisted by the officers of the Himachal Police Service and other Himachal Police officials.

A Deputy Conservator of Forests, an officer belonging to the Indian Forest Service is responsible for managing the Forests, environment and wild-life related issues of the district. He is assisted by the officers of the Himachal Forest Service and other Himachal Forest officials and Himachal Wild-Life officials.

Sectoral development is looked after by the district head of each development department such as PWD, Health, Education, Agriculture, Animal husbandry, etc. These officers belong to the various State Services.

== List ==
S. No.	District	Headquarters	Established	Area (km^{2})	Population (2011 census)	Population density (/km^{2})	Map
1	Bilaspur	Bilaspur	1954	1,167	381,956	327	
2	Chamba	Chamba	1948	6,522	519,080	80	
3	Hamirpur	Hamirpur	1972	1,118	454,768	407	
4	Kangra	Dharamsala	1972	5,739	1,510,075	263	
5	Kinnaur	Reckong Peo	1960	6,401	84,121	13	
6	Kullu	Kullu	1963	5,503	437,903	80	
7	Lahaul and Spiti	Kyelang	1960	13,835	18,564	1	
8	Mandi	Mandi	1948	3950	999,777	250	
9	Shimla	Shimla	1972	5,131	814,010	159	
10	Sirmaur	Nahan	1948	2,825	529,855	188	
11	Solan	Solan	1972	1,936	580,320	300	
12	Una	Una	1972	1,540	521,173	338	

== Demands for new districts ==
Proposals for new districts in Himachal Pradesh are primarily driven by the state's rugged mountainous terrain, which creates significant travel distances to current district headquarters. Demands focus on decentralizing administration to improve governance in extreme interior regions, as well as enhancing infrastructure, security, and law enforcement along sensitive international and interstate borders.

List of Proposed Districts in Himachal Pradesh Grouped by Current District
Proposed District	Proposed HQ	Border / Region	Rationale for Creation
Proposed from Chamba
Bharmour	Bharmour	Borders Jammu and Kashmir (Bhaderwah).	Proposed to establish a permanent administrative presence in one of India's most remote regions, near the Kishtwar border.
Pangi	Killar	Borders Ladakh (Zanskar) and Jammu and Kashmir (Kishtwar/Padder).	Demanded to improve governance and infrastructure in extreme terrain adjacent to sensitive union territory borders.
Proposed from Kangra
Nurpur	Nurpur	Borders Punjab (Pathankot) and Jammu and Kashmir (Kathua).	Proposed to decentralize administration and manage interstate border requirements.
Dehra	Dehra Gopipur	Borders Punjab (Hoshiarpur/Gurdaspur).	Aimed at improving local administration and interstate coordination.
Palampur	Palampur	Interior hilly region.	Proposed to reduce travel distances for residents in the interior blocks.
Jaisinghpur	Jaisinghpur	Interior hilly region.	Sought by local bodies to improve administrative accessibility.
Proposed from Kinnaur
Reo Purgyil (Upper Kinnaur)	Pooh	Borders Ladakh (Kaurik/Tashigang) and China.	Strategically significant area; proposed to improve border security coordination and infrastructure along the Line of Actual Control.
Maathi-Baspa	Rakchham	Borders Ladakh (Pulam Sumda) and China.	Driven by the strategic need for a dedicated administrative setup near the international border.
Proposed from Kullu
Manali	Manali	Interior hilly region.	Proposed to manage the high volume of tourism and decentralized administrative needs.
Proposed from Lahaul and Spiti
Spiti	Kaza	Borders Ladakh (Chumar) and China.	Proposed to enhance border security and infrastructure on the sensitive international border with Tibet.
Proposed from Mandi
Jogindernagar	Jogindernagar	Interior hilly region.	Demanded to decentralize administration from the Mandi district headquarters.
Sundernagar	Sundernagar	Interior hilly region.	Proposed to address the administrative requirements of a growing urban and rural population.
Dharampur	Dharampur	Interior hilly region.	Demanded by local residents to improve localized governance.
Proposed from Shimla
Rampur	Rampur Bushahr	Borders Uttarakhand (Yamunotri/Uttarkashi).	Proposed to establish a dedicated administrative setup (Collector and SP) to manage the interior and border regions effectively.
Mahasu	Kotkhai	Borders Uttarakhand (Tiuni/Chakrata).	Aimed at decentralizing governance from the state capital region.
Proposed from Sirmaur
Paonta Sahib	Paonta Sahib	Borders Uttarakhand (Dehradun) and Haryana (Yamunanagar).	An industrial and transit hub; proposed to improve law enforcement and revenue management on busy interstate borders.
Proposed from Solan
Nalagarh	Nalagarh / Baddi	Borders Chandigarh and Haryana (Panchkula).	Proposed to provide dedicated administrative and law enforcement resources to the state's primary industrial belt.
Proposed from Una
East Una	Amb	Borders Punjab (Hoshiarpur).	Proposed to manage interstate transit, law enforcement, and local administrative delivery.

== See also ==
- Administrative divisions of India
