= Douie =

Douie is a surname. Notable people with the surname include:

- James Douie (1854–1935), British colonial official
- Vera Douie (1894–1979), Scottish librarian

== See also ==
- Margaret Douie Dougal, British chemical publication indexer
