= Himachal State Museum =

Indian cultural museum

Coordinates: 31°06′12.0″N 77°09′03.0″E

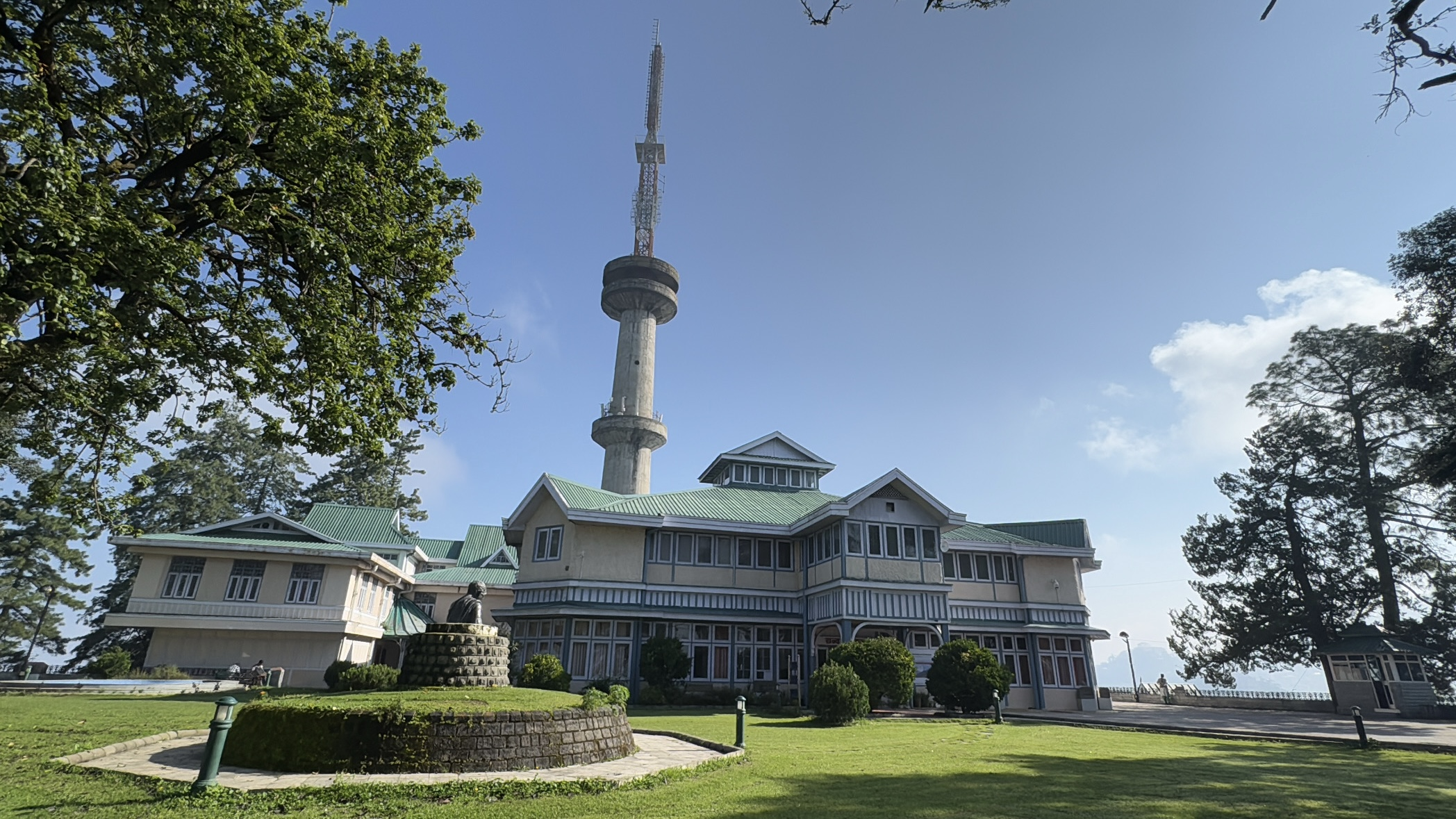
- Museum's main premises and TV Tower as viewed behind it
- Established: 26 January 1974
- Location: Chaura Maidan Road, Chaura Maidan, Shimla, Himachal Pradesh, India
- Type: Cultural
- Website: www.himachalstatemuseum.in

The Himachal State Museum is a cultural museum located in Shimla, in the Indian Himalayan state of Himachal Pradesh.

The museum was established in 1974 in Inverarm, a house at the top of Inverarm Hill that during the British Raj was the hot season residence of Lord William Beresford (and frequently used for overflow guests at the Viceroy's house in Shimla, Peterhoff, which was smaller), and subsequently of Edwin Henry Hayter Collen and then Edward FitzGerald Law. It was built out into a large Victorian house in the 1860s. The state of Himachal Pradesh acquired it to house the museum and renovated in 1973.

The collection includes wood carvings, bronzes, archaeological artefacts, coins, jewellery, manuscripts, paintings including many miniatures, postage stamps, and weapons.

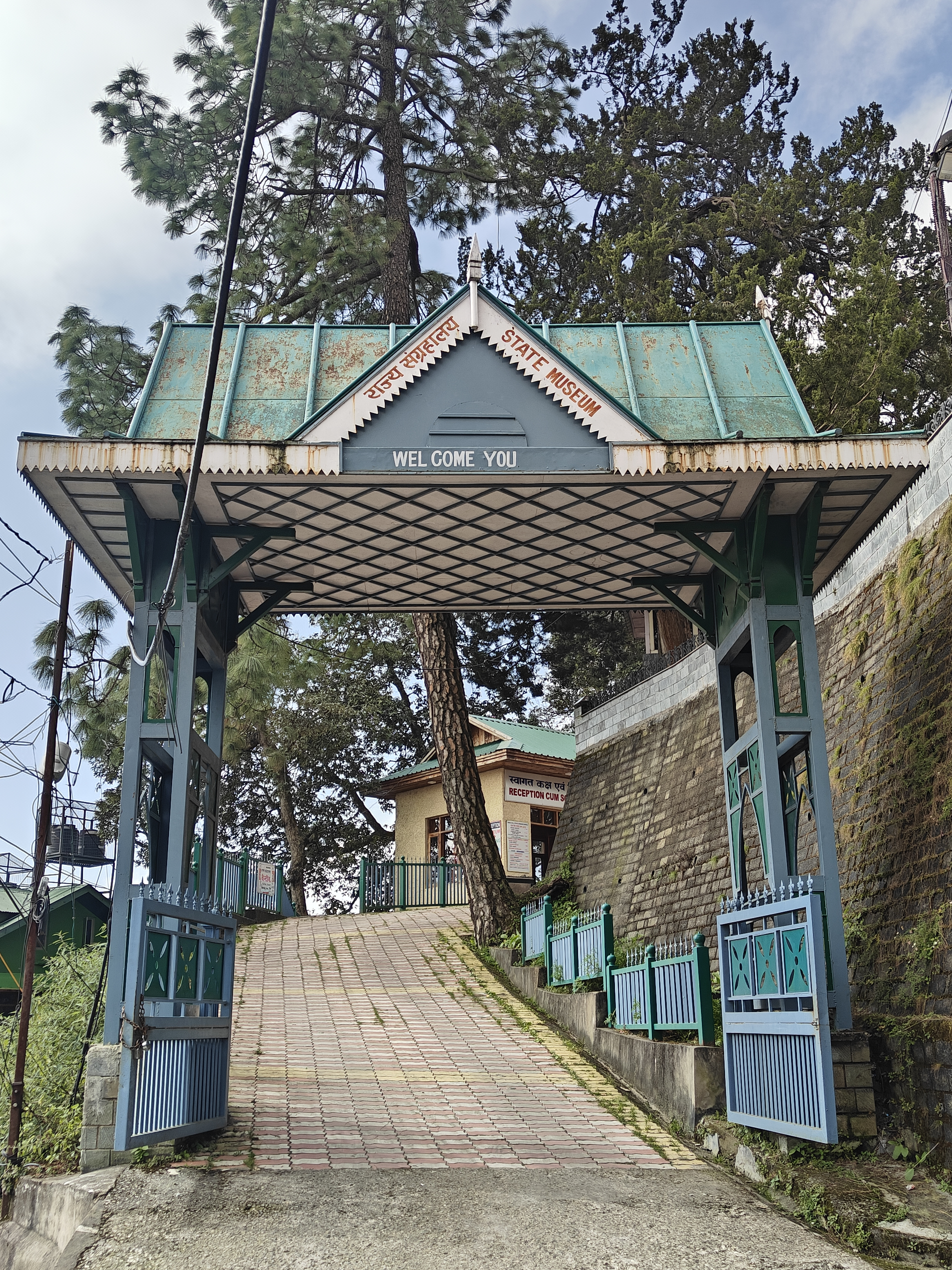
Entry Gate of the Museum
