= Chaura Maidan =

Neighbourhood in Shimla, Himachal Pradesh, India

- Neighbourhood
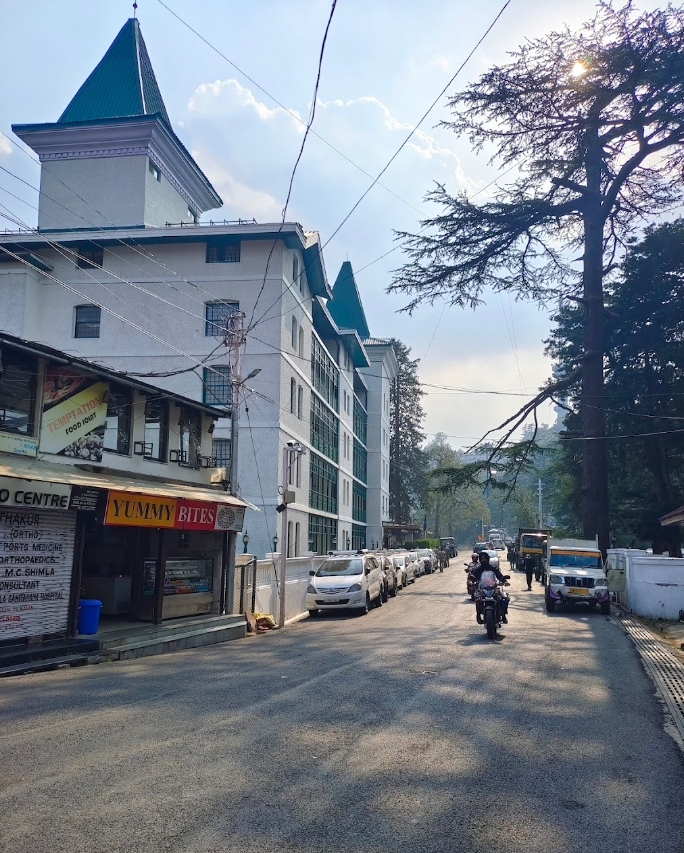
- View of Chaura Maidan with The Cecil
- Interactive map of Chaura Maidan
- Country: India
- State: Himachal Pradesh
- District: Shimla
- City: Shimla
- Elevation: 2,121 m (6,959 ft)
- PIN: 171004

Chaura Maidan is a part of Shimla in the North Indian state of Himachal Pradesh. It lies in the city center. Chaura Maidan is home to the Himachal Pradesh Vidhan Sabha, various state and central government departments and top hotels. It is one of the most posh localities of Shimla.

== Etymology ==
Chaura Maidan is one of the central and historically important localities of Shimla. It lies on a relatively broader and flatter ridge area compared to many steep surrounding parts of Shimla, which is why the name "Chaura Maidan" literally means "wide ground".

== Geography ==
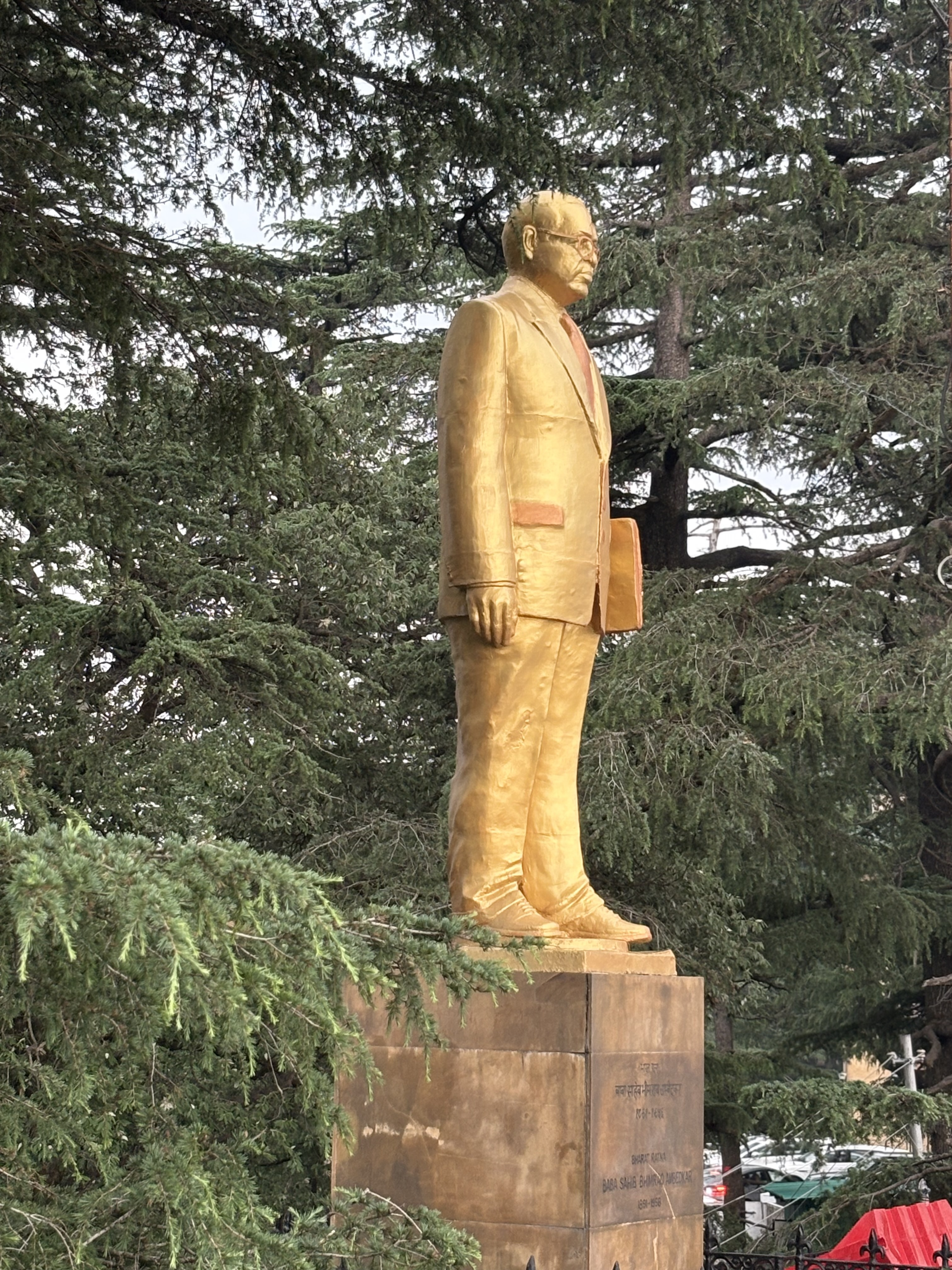
Statue of B.R. Ambedkar at Ambedkar Chowk, Chaura Maidan

The locality stands on comparatively gentler terrain than many other Shimla ridges, making it suitable for large institutions, government buildings, schools, and open grounds. Dense deodar forests historically surrounded the area, especially toward Annadale and Glen forests. Even today, the region retains substantial green cover. The nearby Glen Forest forms an important ecological green belt below Chaura Maidan. It is situated between important Shimla areas of Annadale, Kaithu, Summer Hill, Boileauganj and Mall Road.

== Importance ==
=== Strategic and Administrative importance ===
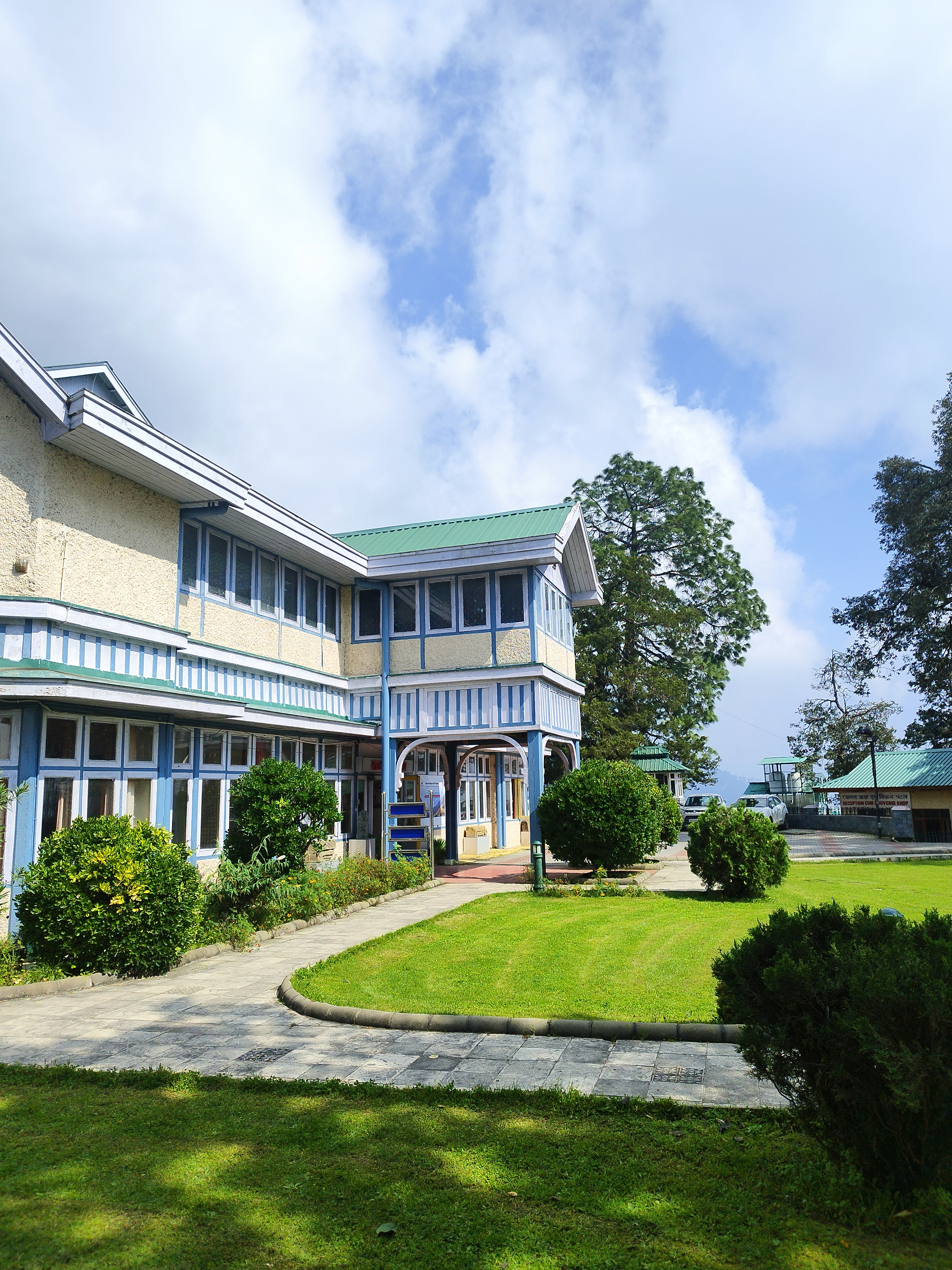
Himachal State Museum, atop of Invararm Hill

Chaura Maidan is one of the most important areas of Shimla in terms of strategic and administrative importance, as it contains one of the most important government departments of both state and central government. Mainly it is home to Himachal Pradesh Vidhan Sabha, CPWD Office (Kennedy Cottage, first pucca building of Shimla), Labour Bereau Office, State Museum, Himalayan Bird Park, Circuit House, All India Radio, etc.

=== Educational importance ===
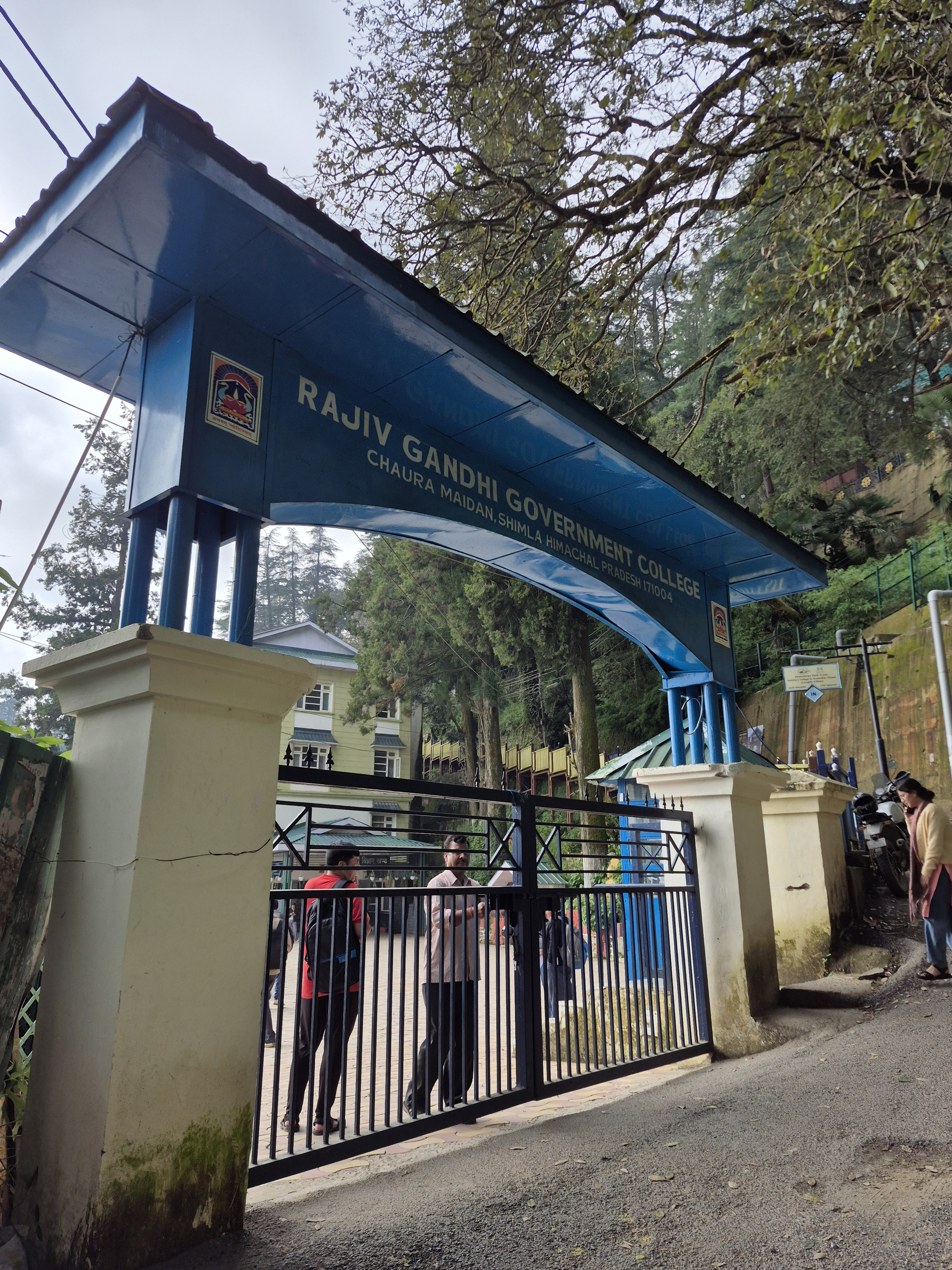
Main gate of Rajiv Gandhi Government College (Kotshera College)

Chaura Maidan is a major educational hub of Shimla. Important institutions include Rajiv Gandhi Government Degree College (Kotshera College), University College of Business Studies, University Institute of Legal Studies, B.R. Ambedkar State Library, etc. Kotshera College itself is located amidst forests near Inverarm Hill and Annadale. The area was historically occupied by colonial-era estates and residences.

=== Hospitality centre ===
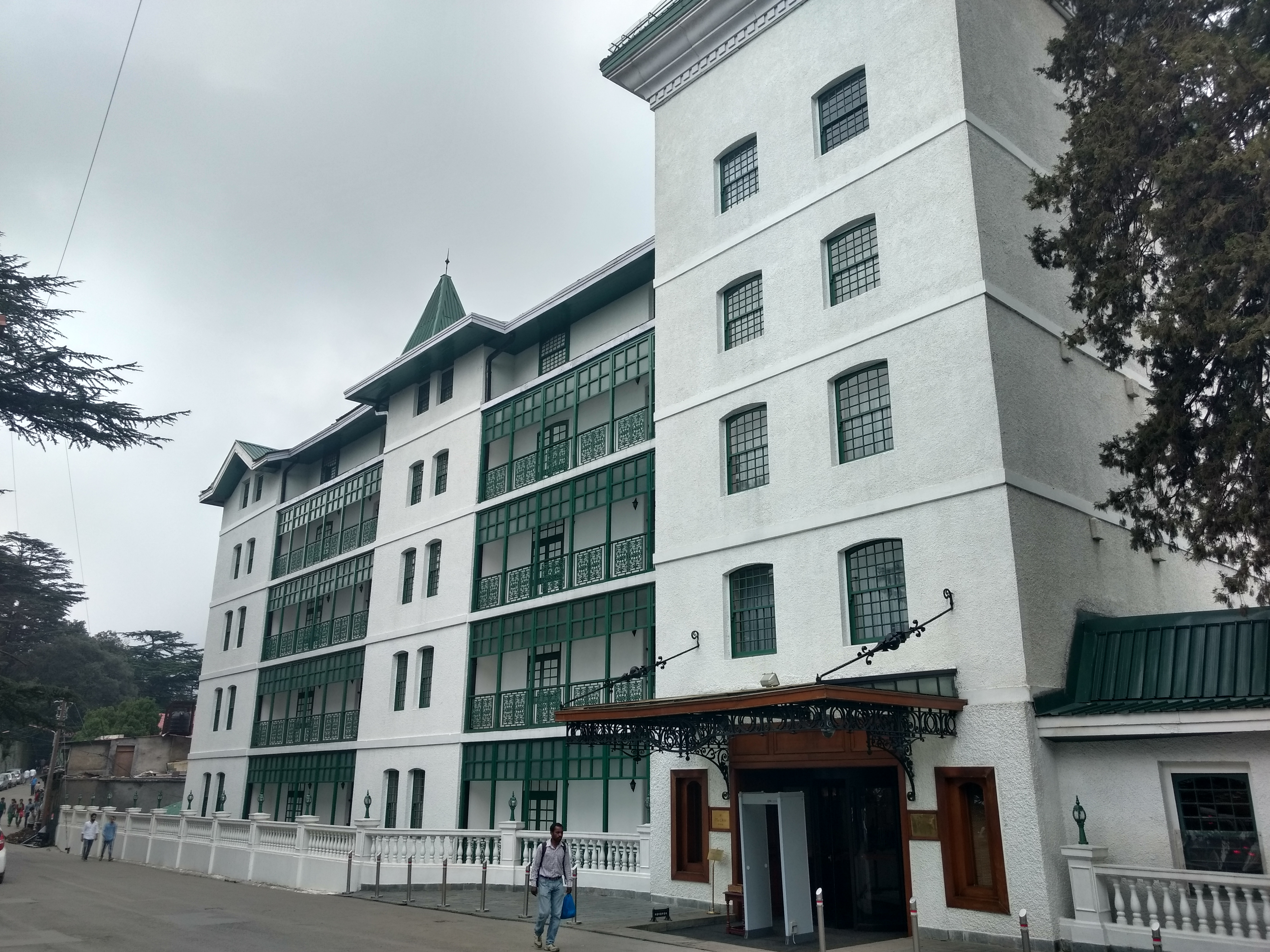
The Oberoi Cecil

Chaura Maidan is one of the primary areas in Shimla with top rated hotels, mainly it includes five-star hotels of The Cecil and Peterhoff. There are many other hotels in the locality too.

== Connectivity ==
Chaura Maidan acts as a connecting zone between The Mall, Annadale, Kaithu, Summer Hill, Boileauganj, Nabha, Phagli, etc. localities. Shimla Railway Station is also located just below Chaura Maidan, because of this, it remains an important transport and movement corridor within Shimla.

== Cultural and urban character ==
Chaura Maidan is considered one of Shimla’s more prestigious localities, relatively institutional and administrative in character, greener and less commercially chaotic than areas like Sanjauli, Lower Bazaar, etc. The area is also known for old colonial bungalows, educational atmosphere, walking routes, forested surroundings, views toward Annadale valley and surrounding hills. Shimla historical The Ridge is actually forms its continuity till Chaura Maidan which lies within the complex Himalayan geology of the Shimla hills. The broader Shimla ridge system is geologically significant because it sits on ancient rock formations thrust over younger strata during Himalayan mountain building processes.
