= Army Heritage Museum, Shimla =

Army Heritage Museum
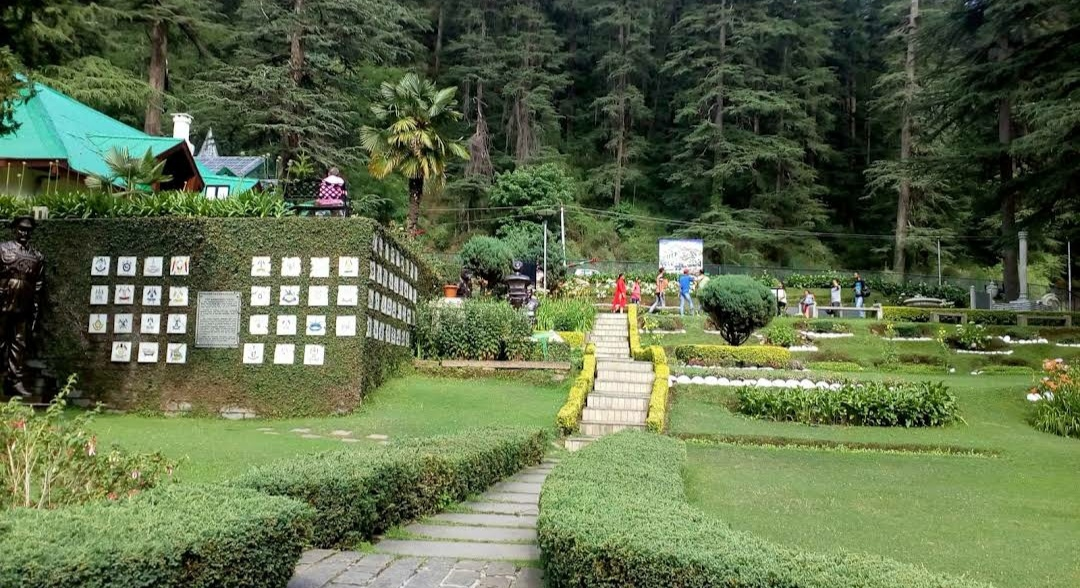
- Army Heritage Museum Garden view
- Established: 2006
- Location: Annadale, Shimla, Himachal Pradesh, India
- Coordinates: 31°06′33″N 77°09′33″E
- Type: Army Museum
- Founder: Army Training Command

The Army Heritage Museum is located in Annadale suburb of Shimla city, India. It is situated in the Army cantonment, close to Annadale ground and helipad.

== Description ==
Annadale is located in Shimla city, and has the Army Heritage Museum. Annadale is located in the close proximity of The Ridge. It serves as the picnic spot. The museum has a collection of items such as ancient weapons, ammunitions and life history of Indian warriors.

== Sections ==
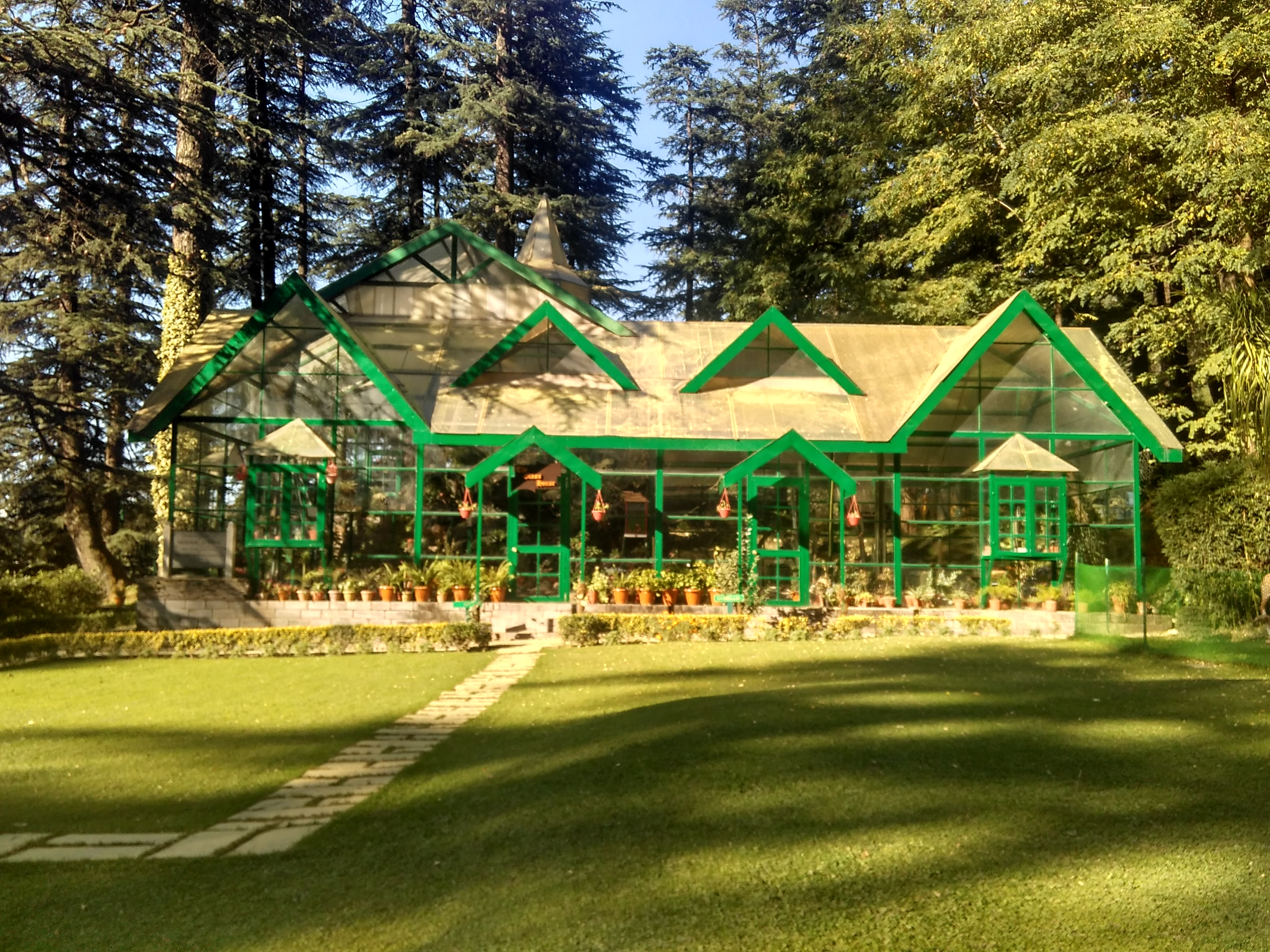
Green House, one of the major four sections of the Museum

The museum has four major sections:

- Heritage Section
- Himachal Corner
- Shaurya Hall
- Green House

=== Subsections ===
The museum has several subsections:

- Great Military Leaders
- Uniforms of the Indian Army (pre and post-independence)
- Ethos of Indian Army
- Army and the Nation
- About UN Peacekeeping forces
- Arms, Weapons and ammunition (ancient and modern India)
- Flags and bands of the Army
- Contribution of Indian Army personals to sports
- Various awards, honors and recognition provided in the Indian Army
- History of Shimla
- Conservation of Flora and Fauna of the region

== Legacy ==
The museum also has a Pakistani letter box which was brought by the Indian Army as a souvenir of the Indo-Pakistani war of 1971. It documents 5,000-year-old history of wars and warfare and activities of martial forces dating back from the Mahabharata era till date. The motto and culture of Indian Army is represented through the various items organized in various sections of the Army Heritage Museum. There is a separate section where important achievements of Indian warriors are described.

The history of warriors like Maharana Pratap, Rani Laxmibai, Maharaja Chattrapati Shivaji, Guru Gobind Singh, and Tipu Sultan is shown in the museum. The history of modern warriors, like Field Marshal Sam Manekshaw, K.M. Carriappa and many others is also shown.

The museum also has the surrender letter of Pakistan (1971 war) and Flag of Pakistan. A separate section is there for showcasing arms and weapons of various types.

The collection has ancient items like bows and arrows, swords, spears and also has modern ammunition including AK-47. Army uniforms dating back to pre-independence time as well as after the independence are kept there. Medals, rewards and awards of the Indian Army are also displayed. Many of these medals depict strong bonding between the Royal Nepal Army and the Indian Army.
