= Edward Law =

Edward Law may refer to:

- Edward Law, 1st Baron Ellenborough (1750–1818)
- Edward Law, 1st Earl of Ellenborough (1790–1871), son of the above
- Edward Law, 5th Baron Ellenborough (1841–1915), grandson of the 1st Baron, nephew of the Earl
- Edward FitzGerald Law (1846–1908), British diplomat
