= 1906 New Year Honours =

Appointments by Edward VII

The New Year Honours 1906 were appointments by Edward VII to various orders and honours to reward and highlight good works by members of the British Empire. They were published on 1 December 1905 and 2 January 1906.

The recipients of honours are displayed here as they were styled before their new honour, and arranged by honour, with classes (Knight, Knight Grand Cross, etc.) and then divisions (Military, Civil, etc.) as appropriate.

== Order of the Star of India ==
=== Knights Grand Commander (GCSI) ===
- His Highness Saramad-i-Rajaha-i-Bundelkhand Mahanija Mahindra Sawai Sir Pratap Singh Bahadur, GCIE, of Orchha

=== Knights Commander (KCSI) ===
- Joseph Bampfylde Fuller, Esq, CSI, CIE, Indian Civil Service, Lieutenant-Governor of Eastern Bengal and Assam.
- Lieutenant-Colonel Harold Arthur Deane, CSI, Chief Commissioner and Agent to the Governor-General, North-West Frontier Province.
- Sir Edward FitzGerald Law, KCMG, CSI, lately an Ordinary Member of the Council of the Governor-General.
- His Highness Raja Bhure Singh, CIE, of Chamba.

=== Companions (CSI) ===
- John William Pitt Muir-Mackenzie, Esq, Indian Civil Service, Member of the Council of the Governor of Bombay.
- Cecil Michael Wilford Brett, Esq, Indian Civil Service, Puisne Judge of the High Court of Judicature at Fort-William in Bengal.
- Apcar Alexander Apcar, Esq, President of the Bengal Chamber of Commerce, and an Additional Member of the Council of the Governor-General for making Laws and Regulations.
- Lancelot Hare, Esq, CIE, Indian Civil Service, Member of the Board of Revenue, Land Revenue Department, Bengal, and an Additional Member of the Council of the Governor-General for making Laws and Regulations.
- Nawab Bahadur Kwaja Salimullah of Dacca, Additional Member of the Council of the Governor-General for making Laws and Regulations.
- Herbert Bradley, Esq, Indian Civil Service, First Member of the Board of Revenue, Madras, and an Additional Member of the Council of the Governor of Fort St. George for making Laws and Regulations.
- James McCrone Douie, Esq, Indian Civil Service, Settlement Commissioner of the Punjab, and a Member of the Council of the Lieutenant-Governor of the Punjab for making Laws and Regulations.
- Frank Campbell Gates, Esq, Indian Civil Service, Chief Secretary to the Government of Burma, and a Member of the Council of the Lieutenant-Governor of Burma for making Laws and Regulations.
- George Casson Walker, Esq, Indian Civil Service, Assistant Minister (Finance) to the Government of His Highness the Nizam of Hyderabad.
- John Mitchell Holms, Esq, Indian Civil Service, Chief Secretary to the Government of the United Provinces, at present on special duty as a Member of the Excise Committee.
- Percy Seymour Vesey FitzGerald, Esq, Political Agent at Mahi Eantha.

== The Royal Victorian Order ==
=== Knight Grand Cross of the Royal Victorian Order (GCVO) ===
- Sir Francis Edmund Hugh Elliot, K.C.M.G., His Majesty's Envoy Extraordinary and Minister Plenipotentiary at Athens.
- Algernon Bertram Freeman-Mitford, Baron Redesdale, K.C.V.O., C.B.

Honorary

- His Excellency Dimitry George Metaxas, Envoy Extraordinary and Minister Plenipotentiary of His Majesty The King of the Hellenes at the Court of St. James's.
- Nicholas Thon, K.C.V.O., Keeper of the Privy Purse to His Majesty The King of the Hellenes

=== Commander of the Royal Victorian Order (CVO) ===
- Sir George Anderson Critchett, Surgeon-Oculist to His Majesty.
- Colonel Henry Knollys, M.V.O., Comptroller in England to Their Majesties The King and Queen of Norway.

Honorary

- Major Milliotti Gomnene, M.V.O., Aide-de-Camp to His Majesty The King of the Hellenes.
- Leo Kuno MacMahon, Count de Cernowitz, Equerry to His Majesty The King of the Hellenes.

=== Member of the Royal Victorian Order, 4th class (MVO) ===
Honorary

- Captain Antoine Constantin Pali, Aide-de-Camp to His Royal Highness Prince Nicholas of Greece.
- Lyrimaque Caftanzoglu, Secretary of the Greek Legation, London.

== Order of the Indian Empire ==
=== Knights Grand Commander (GCIE) ===
- Major-General Sir Edmond Roche Elles, KCB, KCIE, lately an Ordinary Member of the Council of the Governor-General.
- His Highness Nawab Sidi Sir Ahmed Khan Sidi Ibrahim Khan, KCIE, of Janjira.

=== Knights Commander (KCIE) ===
- Major Arthur Henry MacMahon, CSI, CIE, Political Department of the Government of India, lately British Commissioner, Seistan Arbitration Commission.

=== Companions (CIE) ===
- Rai Sri Ram Bahadur, an Additional Member of the Council of the Governor-General for making Laws and Regulations.
- Surgeon-General William Richard Browne, MD, Indian Medical Service, Surgeon-General with the Government of Madras.
- Montague de Pomeroy Webb, Esq, Chairman of the Karachi Chamber of Commerce, and an Additional Member of the Council of the Governor of Bombay for making Laws and Regulations.
- Major Frederick Doveton Maxwell, Indian Army, Officiating Commissioner of the Irrawadi Division, Burma.
- Hugh William Orange, Esq, Director-General of Education in India.
- Major Charles Archer, Political Agent and Deputy Commissioner, Quetta and Pishin.
- Lionel Muling Wynch, Esq, Indian Civil Service, Private Secretary to the Governor of Madras.
- Charles Raitt Cleveland, Esq, Indian Civil Service, Inspector-General of Police, Central Provinces.
- Arthur William Uglow Pope, Esq, Traffic Superintendent of the Oudh and Rohilkhand Railway.
- Nicholas Dodd Beatson Bell, Esq, Indian Civil Service, Officiating Director of Land Records and Agriculture, Bengal.
- George Frederick William Thibaut, Esq, PhD, Principal, Muir Central College, Allahabad.
- Major William Arthur Watson, Indian Army, Commandant, Imperial Cadet Corps.
- Major Alain Joly de Lotbiniere, RE, Superintending Engineer, Western Circle, Mysore State, at present employed in Kashmir.
- Captain Arthur Francis Ferguson-Davie, DSO, Indian Army, 3rd Sikhs, lately Commandant, Northern Waziristan Militia.
- Captain Aubrey John O'Brien, lately Officiating Deputy Commissioner, Kangra District.
- Herbert Cunningham Clogstoun, Esq, lately Adviser to His Highness the Maharaj Rana of Dholpur, and now Tutor to His Highness the Maharaja Holkar.
- Thomas Robert John Ward, Esq, Executive Engineer, Public Works Department, Irrigation Branch, Punjab, lately Irrigation Officer with the Seistan Arbitration Commission.
- Shamsul-Ulama Khan Bahadur Hoshangji Jamaspji Dastur of Poona.
- Sadar Bahadur Arjnn Singh of Chahal, in the Amritsar District.

== Royal Red Cross (RRC) ==
- Mrs. Isabel May Clay.
- Mrs. Violet Harriet Clay.
- Miss Alice Mabel Purkis.
