= Annadale, Shimla =

Annadale
- Neighbourhood
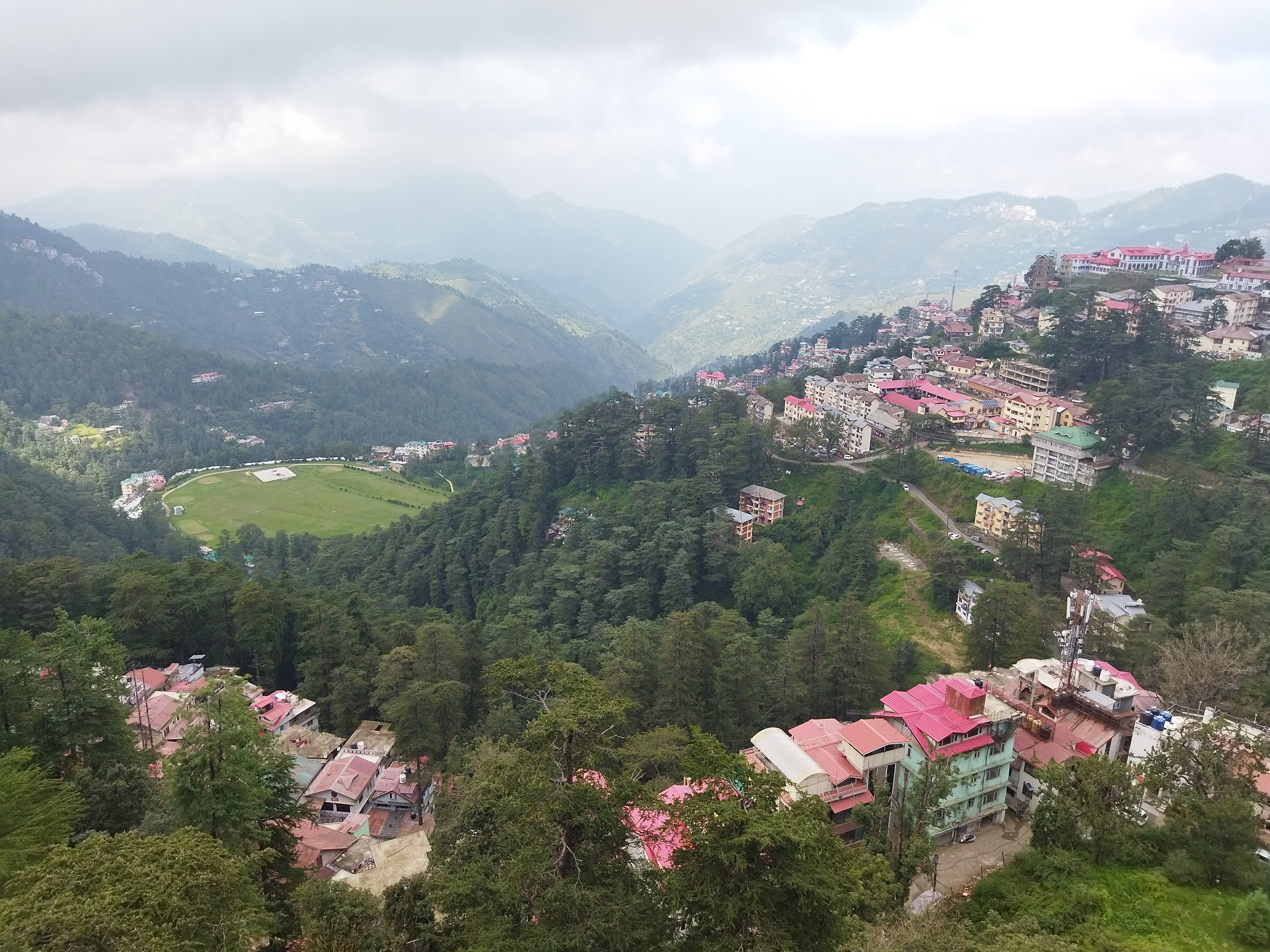
- Annadale ground and suburb view from uphill
- Nickname: Heart of Shimla
- Location of Annadale in Shimla city
- Coordinates: 31.112616°N 77.159479°E
- Country: India
- State: Himachal Pradesh
- District: Shimla
- City: Shimla
- Named for: Anna, Charles Pratt Kennedy's beloved
- Elevation: 1,864 m (6,115 ft)
- PIN: 171003

Annadale, also spelled as Annandale, is a part of Shimla city, in the Indian state of Himachal Pradesh. It is a flat valley bottom which includes a helipad as well as a golf course. Annadale has also an army cantonment, now memorialised in an Army Heritage Museum. Due to its lush green environment, historical importance and geography, it is also known as the "Heart of Shimla".

== Etymology ==
The region in which Annadale is located was first documented in 1834, in the East Indian United Service Journal. When British officers saw the area for the first time, they found it similar to the Annandale valley in Dumfriesshire or County of Dumfries in Scotland, and decided to name it after the Scottish location because most of the officers hailed from the Scotland's Annandale.

According to another story, Charles Pratt Kennedy, the political agent of the British government who was assigned to find a suitable place in India for selecting the Summer Capital, came to Shimla hills in 1822. He was so impressed by the beauty of the dale that he named it after "Anna" his lady love back in England. It is perhaps for this reason, that it has been spelt as both 'Annandale' and 'Annadale' in documents pertaining to Shimla.

== History ==
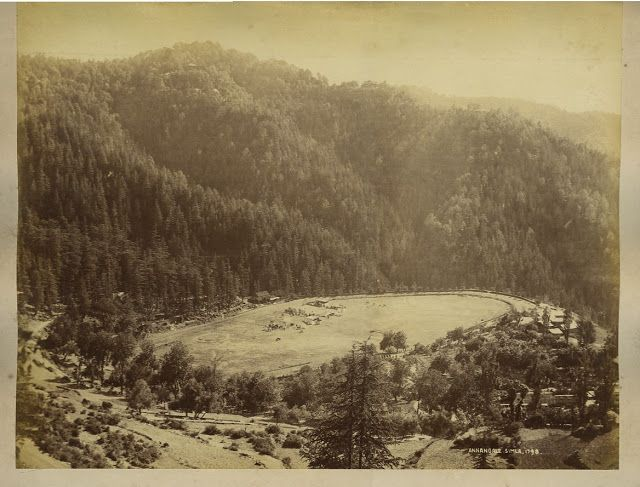
Old photo of Annadale ground

=== British Raj ===
Annadale was first used by East India Company and then the British Raj, which is why natives originally called it "Company Ka Baag". It was a place of enjoyment and entertainment for the British, offering fancy dress shows, picnics, and birthday celebrations. Every year a National Championship of Polo was organised there. Cultural and social festivals were organised there including Gymkhana, fete champetre and sports such as polo and cricket. Under the British Army, the grounds were also used for training and parades. A funfair was organised in September 1833 to raise funds for setting up a school at Sabathu for native girls. In 1839, the first Fancy fair was organised there.

The Durand Football Tournament was started in 1888 in Annadale by Mortimer Durand. It was interrupted during World War I and World War II. The venue was shifted to Delhi in 1940.

=== After independence ===
Gymkhana, polo, football, hockey, cricket matches, and other cultural and social festivals were organised in Annadale after independence. Dussehra was the main event organised, attracting people from the city, but in 1972 a clash between army and police created enmity between the military and civil administration. After this incidence, the event was shifted to Jakhu Temple. Another major event was the 1971 plenary session of the All India Congress Committee. In addition, a national women's field hockey championship was also organised there. A Yajna was organised by Gayatri Parivar in 1994.

In 2006, the Army established a war museum on the periphery of the ground.

== Geography ==
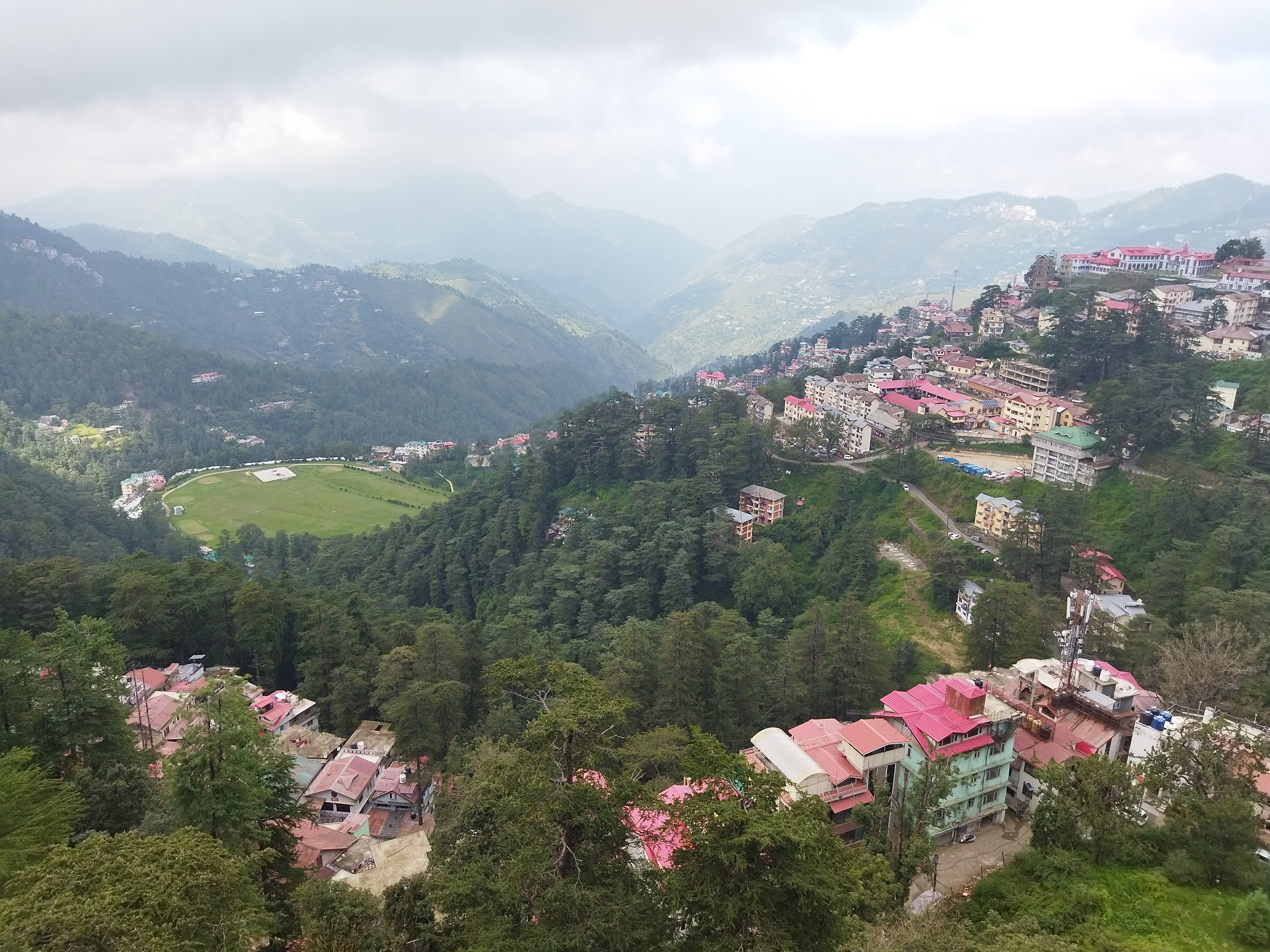
Location of Annadale locality and ground in Shimla as seen from uphill

Annadale is located 2 km away from Shimla Railway Station. Annadale lies exactly below Kaithu locality. The area is situated between lush green mountains and Deodar trees. If The Ridge is taken as a center point then as the Jakhu is on the steep slope up on the hill at the distance of 1.6 km and Annadale is down the hill from The Ridge at the distance of 3.2 km. Annadale has spread from the forest area of Glen, area below Chaura Maidan to Gol Pahari Park near Kashyap Niwas.

== Importance of the ground ==
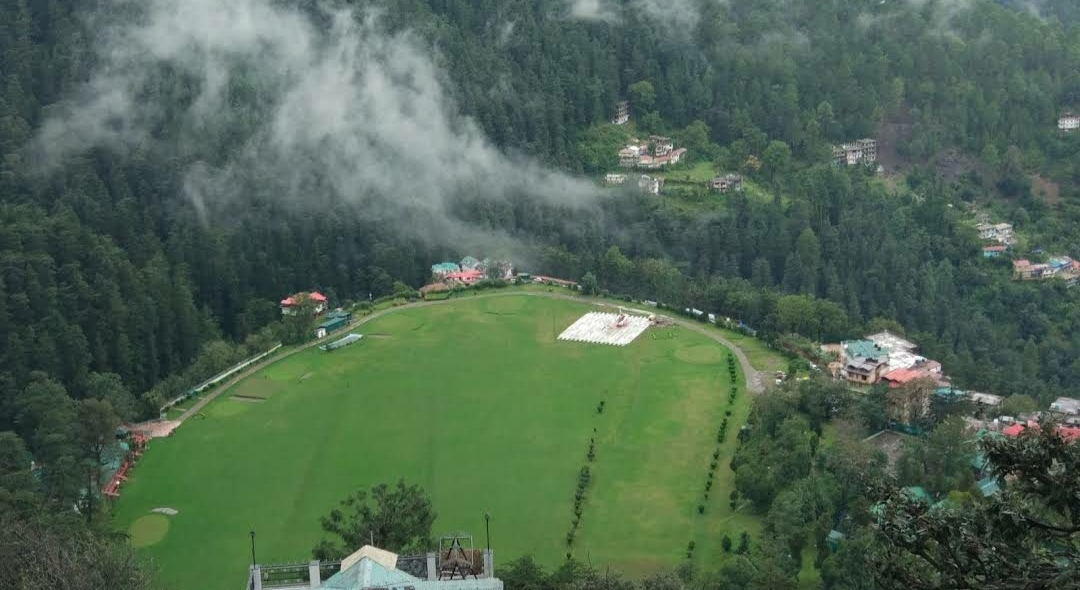
Annadale Ground from uphill

The Annadale ground is the wide flat valley bottom which is situated in a valley bottom. It is a scenic ground which can be seen from many hilltop locations of the city.

=== Golf course ===
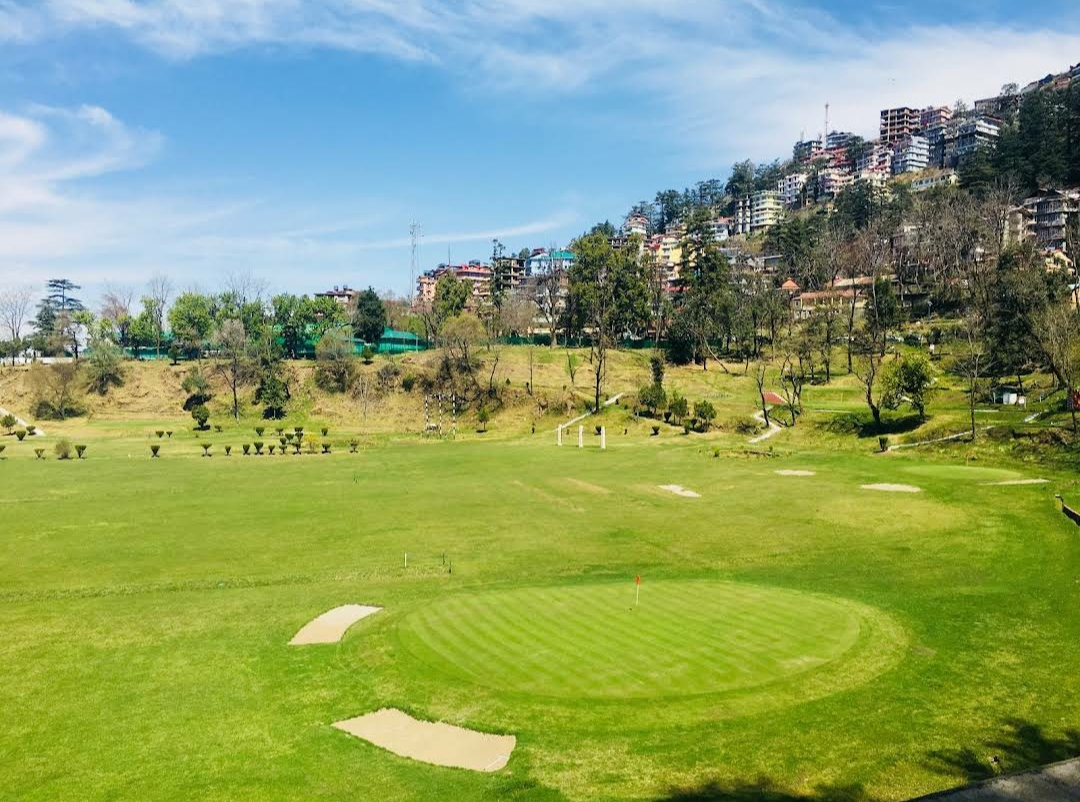
Annadale ground Golf course

The Annadale ground also has a golf course, making it the only one in the city.

=== Helipad ===
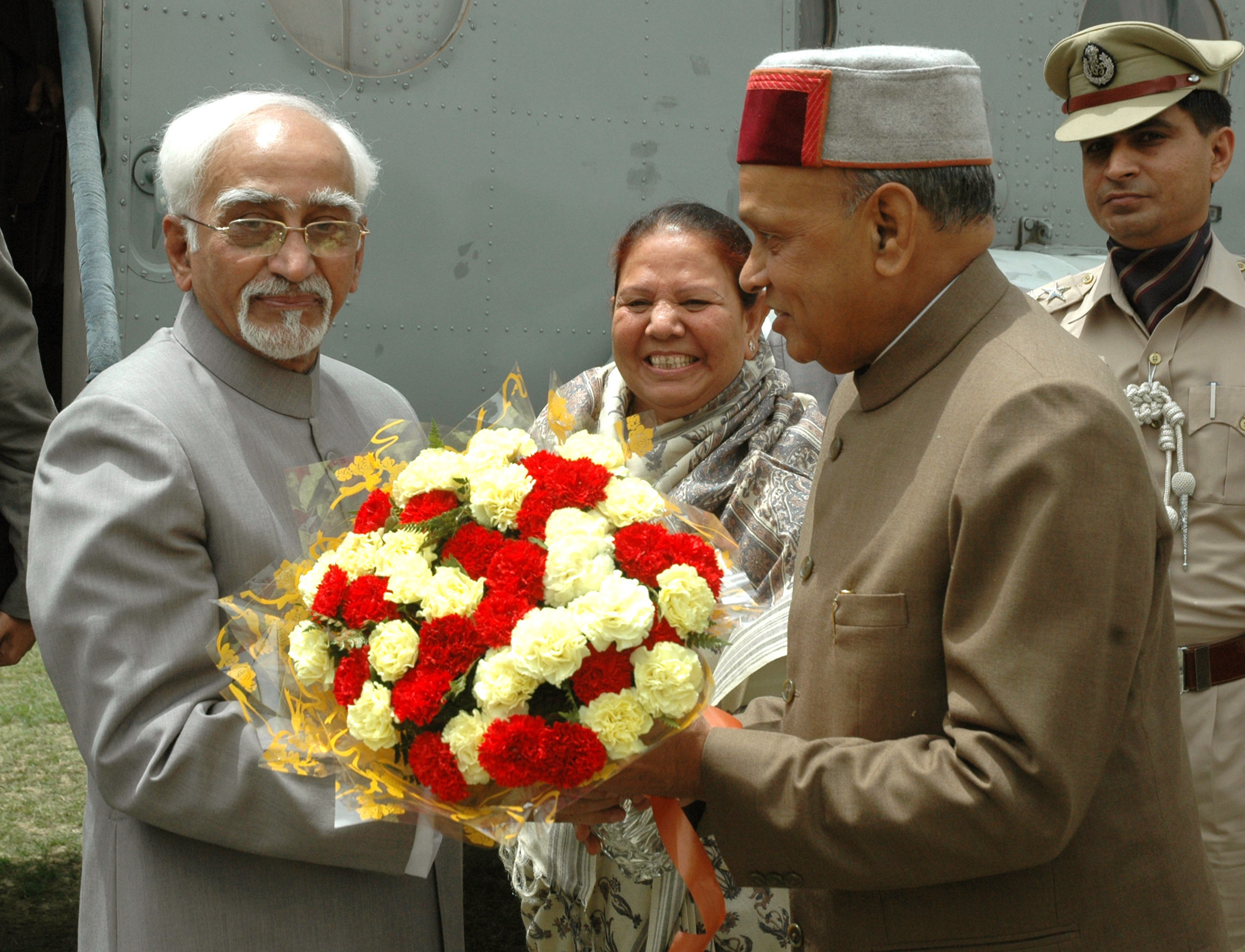
Vice Prisedent Mr. Hamid Ansari on his arrival at Shimla, welcomed by the then CM of Himachal Pradesh Mr. Prem Kumar Dhumal at Annadale

Annadale Ground has a lot of importance in the city mainly due to its lead serving helipad. Every VIP or celebrity lands there whenever they come to Shimla, because Shimla Airport is 20 km away from the main city. Only The President of India usually lands at Kalyani helipad in Chharabra because of the President's retreat location being there.

=== Disaster management purposes ===
The Ground has been used by Indian Army for Disaster management purposes since the past. The ground has been used for conducting various disaster relief and management exercises mainly because Shimla and its adjoining areas are earthquake prone. Annadale Ground has the strategic significance for the Army from the national security perspective. The ground's significance for disaster management was witnessed in 2011 Sikkim earthquake.

== Landmarks ==
=== Army Heritage Museum ===
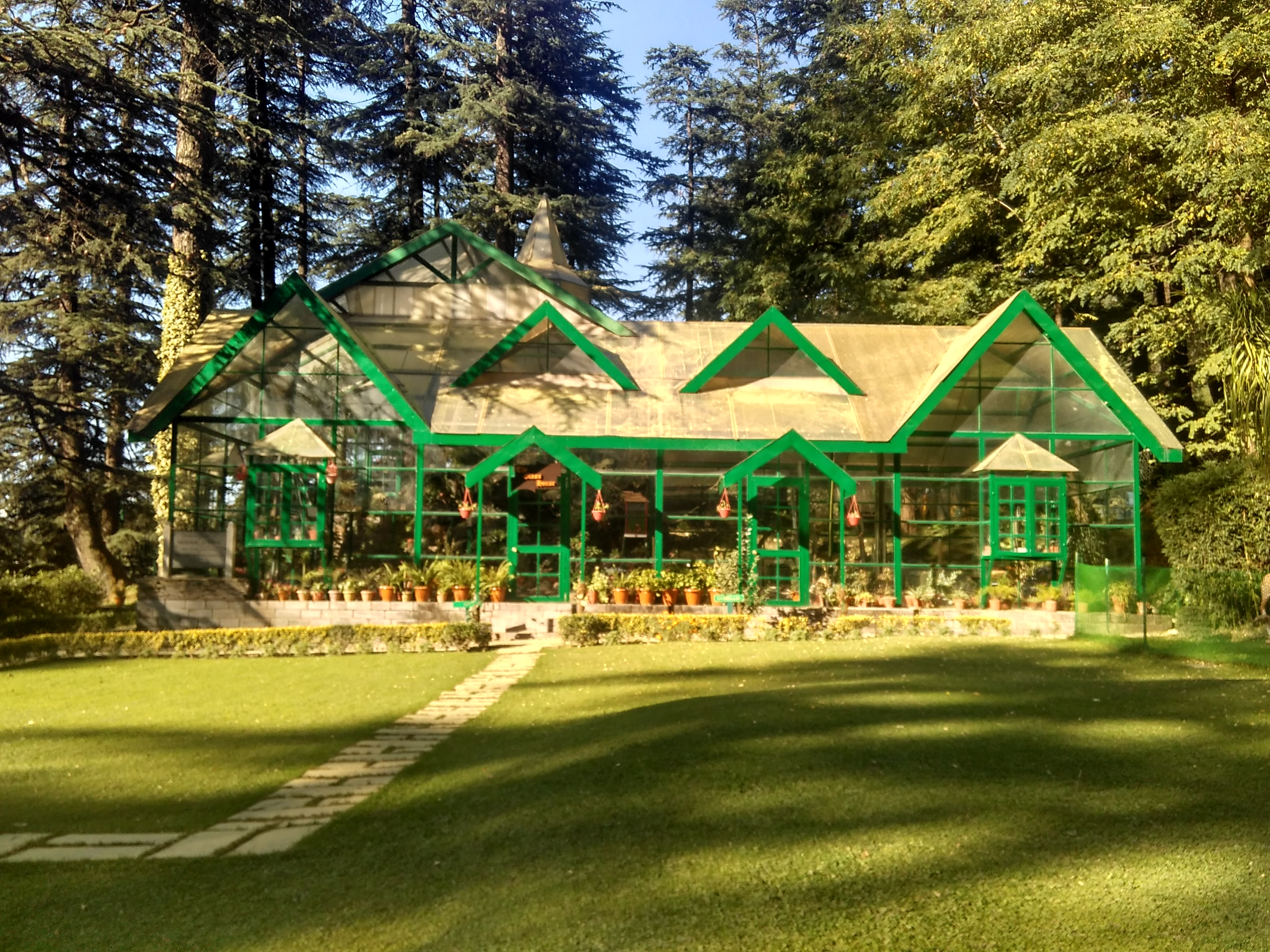
Green House in Army Heritage Museum

The Army Heritage Museum in Annadale was established in 2006. It contains historical weapons, arts and many war memory objects. It is located close to the Annadale ground near the forest area.

=== Shri Ram Mandir ===
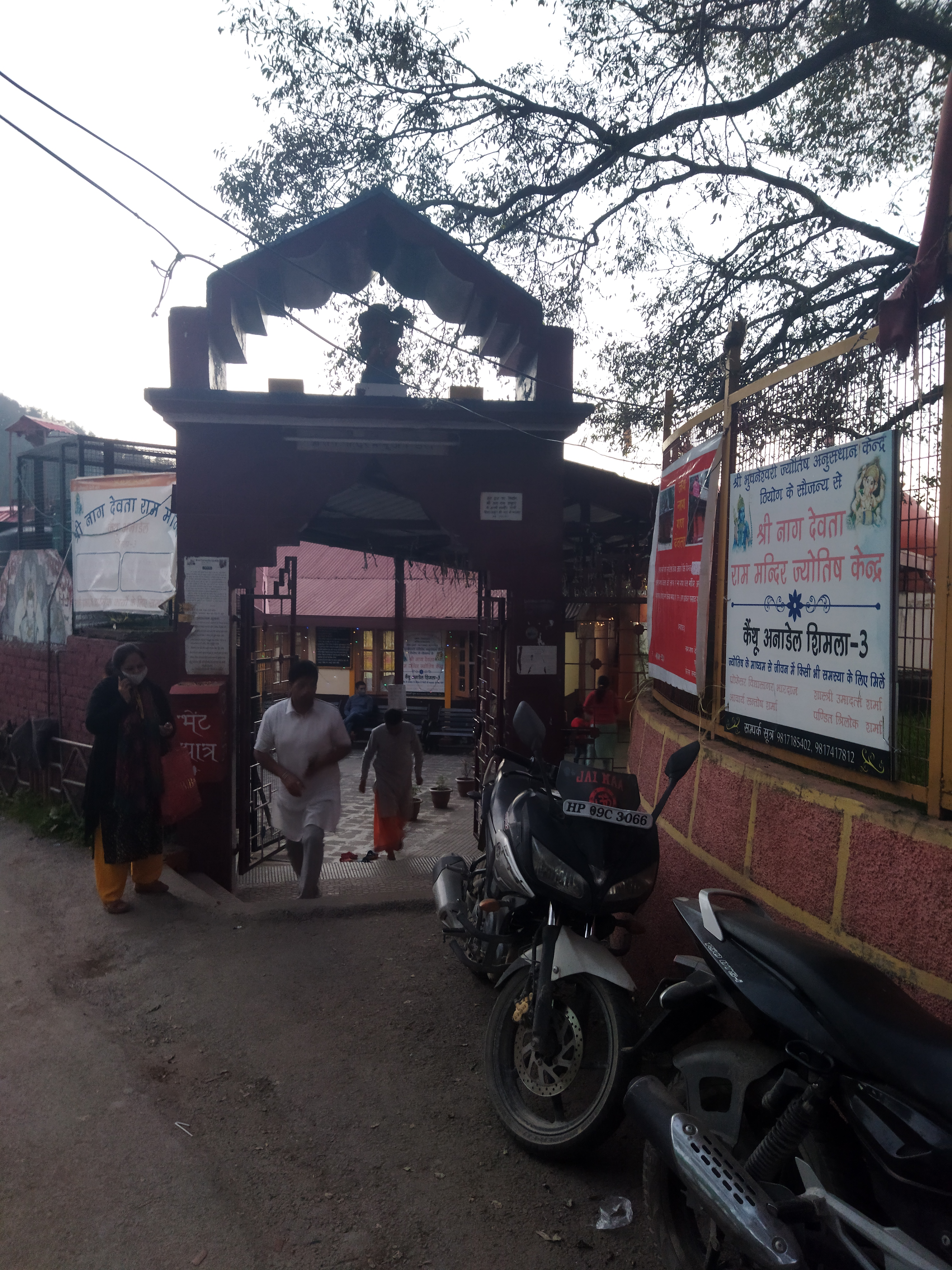
Shri Ram Mandir near Annadale Chowk

Annadale has Shri Ram temple near Annadale Chowk.

=== Gan Devta Mandir (Devra Mandir) ===
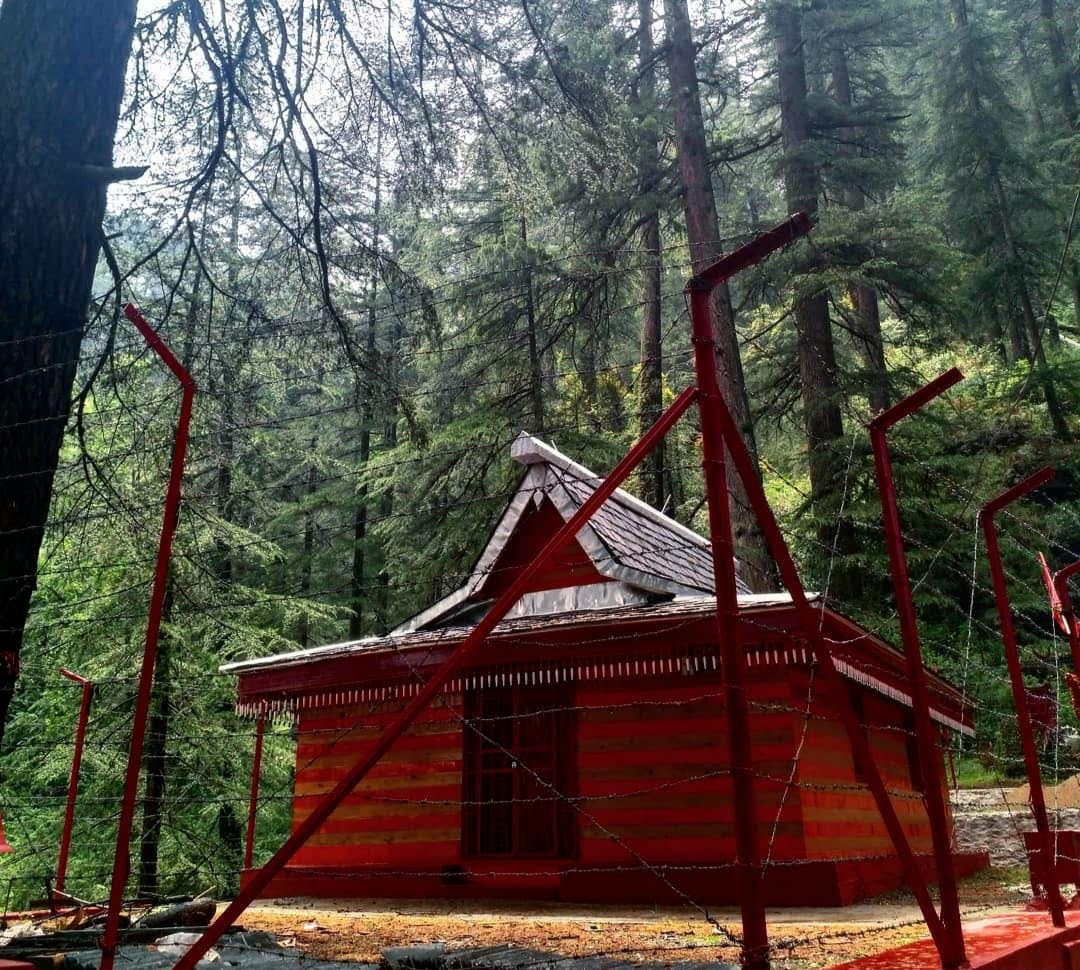
Gan Devta Mandir (Devra) near Army Heritage Museum

Gan Devta temple or Devra temple made in Kath Kuni architectural style is the temple dedicated to the family deity of the locals and it is one of the oldest temples in Shimla, it is located near Army Heritage Museum.

== Controversy ==
Annadale was embroiled in a controversy from 2005 to 2012, when the Himachal Pradesh Government proposed to build an international cricket stadium in the area, but the Indian Army refused this proposal by saying that it would damage the scenic charm and nature of the valley. In 2011, the government made an idea to ask the people of Shimla about this decision, in which the board was placed on The Ridge, on which the people who supported the proposal are required to sign on the board. Most people supported the concept by signing on the board, but the government still needed to heed the Army's demand by cancelling the plan. The cricket stadium proposal was then shifted to Dharamshala, where the HPCA Stadium was later built.
