= Lok Bhavan, Shimla =

Official residence of the Governor of Himachal Pradesh, India

Lok Bhavan
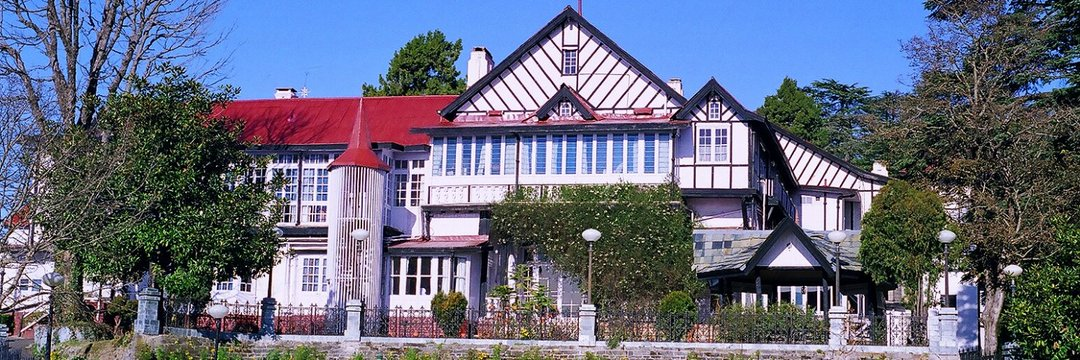
- Interactive map of the Lok Bhavan area

General information
- Coordinates: 31.089°N 77.181°E
- Current tenants: Shiv Pratap Shukla
- Owner: Government of Himachal Pradesh

References
- Website

Lok Bhavan (translation: People's House), formerly known as Raj Bhavan (translation: Government House), and originally called Barnes' Court is the official residence of the Governor of Himachal Pradesh Shiv Pratap Shukla. It is located in the capital city of Shimla, Himachal Pradesh.

== History ==
The present-day Raj Bhavan was earlier known as the Barnes' Court. When Himachal became a full-fledged state in 1971, the Peterhoff served as the Raj Bhavan. After the building was damaged in a fire, the Raj Bhavan was shifted to the Barnes Court building.

Originally named after Edward Barnes, the commander-in-chief of British India, it is a neo-Tudor timber-framed building.

== See also ==
- Government Houses of the British Indian Empire
