= John Theophilus Boileau =

British army engineer and architect

John Theophilus Boileau FRS
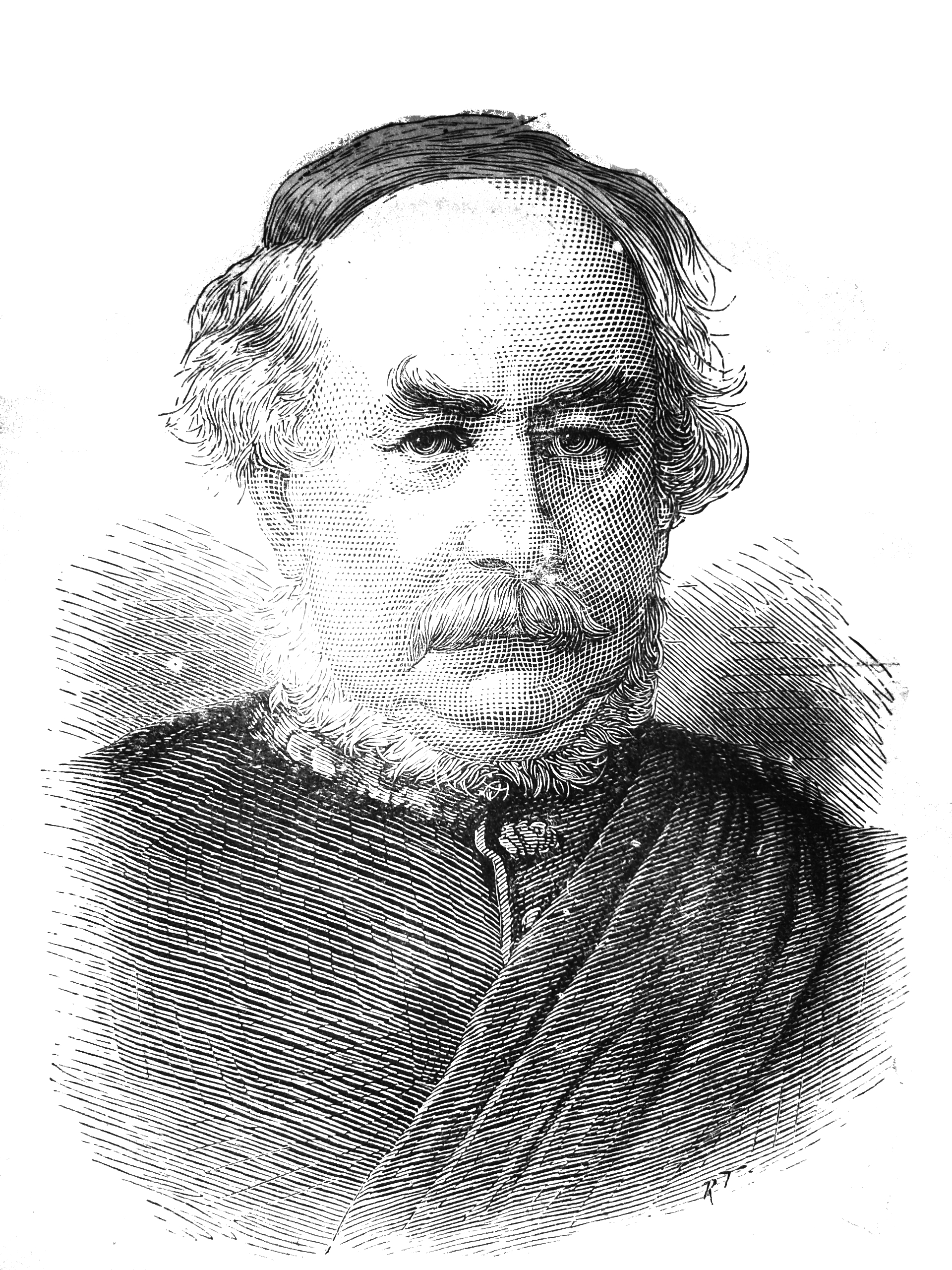
- Boileau as a cadet, c. 1821
- Born: May 26, 1805; Calcutta, India
- Died: November 7, 1886 (aged 81); Notting Hill, London, England
- Education: Addiscombe Military Seminary
- Spouse: Ann Hanson (m. 1829)
- Military career
- Allegiance: East India Company
- Branch: Bengal Engineers
- Service years: 1821–1856
- Rank: Major General
- Known for: Restoration of the Taj Mahal; Designing Christ Church, Shimla
- Other work: Philanthropy for soldiers' families; Middlesex Rifle Volunteers

Major General John Theophilus Boileau FRS (26 May 1805 – 7 November 1886) was a British army engineer who worked in India. He was involved in restoration of Mughal monuments including the Taj Mahal; designed several buildings in India including Christ Church in Shimla and St George's Church in Agra; and established a magnetic observatory at Shimla.

== Life and work ==
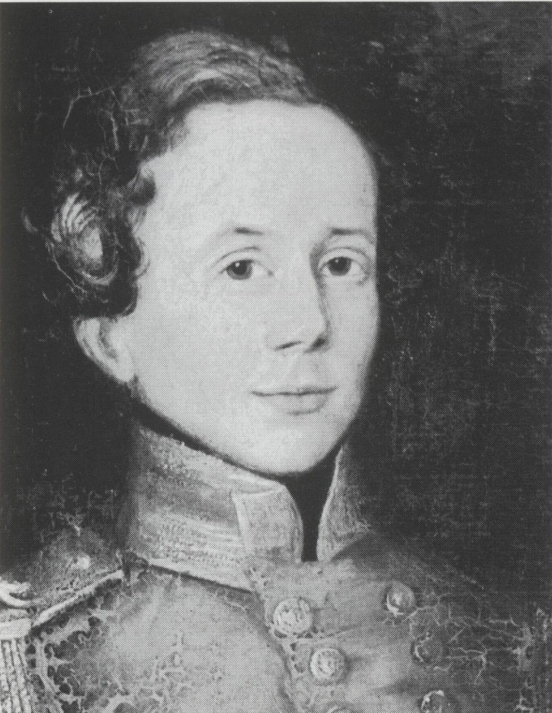
Boileau as a cadet, c. 1821

Boileau was born in Calcutta. His father Thomas Boileau had moved to India in 1780 to work at the Supreme Court in Fort William. On his father's side his ancestors were Huguenots from Nîmes. His mother Leah was the daughter of Lt. Col. Ebenezer Jessup from New England. After the death of the father in 1806, the family moved to live in Bury St. Edmunds, England. After studying at the Grammar School, he received a cadetship at the East India Company Military Seminary at Addiscombe in 1819. His brother Henry joined in the next year. He received prizes in mathematics and Hindustani and was gazetted in 1821 and sent for training to Chatham with the Royal Engineers. He reached Calcutta on 22 September 1822 and then on to Kanpur. He was involved in road building at Jabalpur and between Nagpur and Kamptee. In 1826 he became garrison engineer at Agra, designing the St George Church, the jail, a college, and barracks. In 1829 he married Ann, daughter of Captain Hanson, and on the same day, his brother Henry married Ann's sister at St George's Church. Boileau was involved in reconstruction and repair of several Mughal constructions including Jahangir's palace, Fatehpur, and the Taj Mahal. The cost exceeded the estimates and when he wished to leave the East India Company on furlough in 1834, he was asked to pay thirty thousand rupees as outstanding expenses. In 1839, Boileau was assigned to set up a magnetic observatory at Simla after being trained by Professor Humphrey Lloyd of Trinity College, Dublin. He was elected fellow of the Royal Society on 5 March 1840 and later to the Royal Astronomical Society. While at Simla, he also designed the Christ Church and raised funds for its construction. In 1847 he became superintending engineer in the North West Provinces. He then moved to live at Ambala where weekend dinners included flute played by Boileau and piano by his wife Ann. He retired on 4 February 1856 with the rank of Major General, just before the mutiny. The family settled at Notting Hill and he began to work for the wives, widows, and children of soldiers then posted in large numbers in the Crimea. In 1860 he joined the 1st Middlesex Rifle volunteers. Punch magazine depicted a cartoon of him as "Mr Buffles" in 1862. A bust by Thomas Brock is now in the Kensington public library.
