= Peterhoff, Shimla =

Historical building in Chaura Maidan, Shimla

Peterhoff
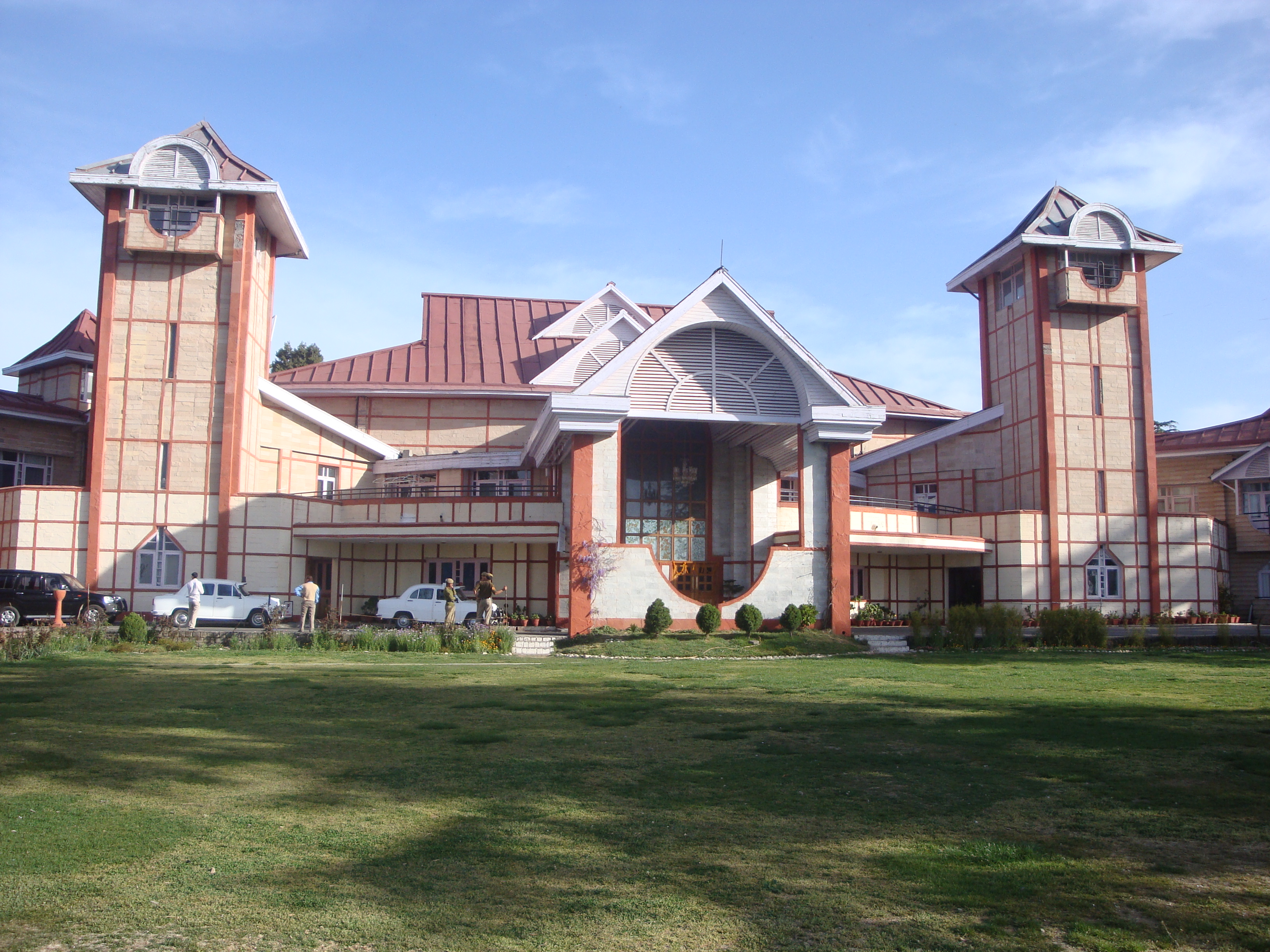
- The Peterhoff in 2010

- Location within Himachal Pradesh
- Former names: Raj Bhavan, Shimla
- Alternative names: The Peterhof

General information
- Location: Chaura Maidan, Shimla, India
- Coordinates: 31.089178°N 77.179886°E
- Renovated: 1991

The Peterhoff is a building in Chaura Maidan, Shimla which housed at least seven viceroys and governors general of India during the British Raj. The original building was in the Tudor style, with wooden frames and shingled eaves. Peterhoff is situated in Annadale, in the ward of Shimla. After India's independence from the British Empire, the building served as the Punjab High Court. It was at Peterhoff that the trial of Nathuram Godse, who assassinated Mahatma Gandhi, took place in 1948-49.

In 1971, when Himachal Pradesh became a full-fledged state, Peterhoff was the Raj Bhavan (the governor's residence). Subsequently, the Raj Bhavan was shifted to the Barnes' Court building. The Peterhof was rebuilt to a new design as a luxury hotel in 1991.

== History ==
Peterhoff was constructed in 1863 as the summer residence of at least seven British Viceroys, with the first being the Earl of Elgin, who moved into the building in 1863. After India's independence from the British Empire, the building served as the Punjab High Court. It was at Peterhoff that the trial of Nathuram Godse, who assassinated Mahatma Gandhi, took place in 1948–49. In 1971, Peterhoff became the Raj Bhavan for Himachal Pradesh until it was gutted by fire on 12 January 1981. The governor's office was then shifted to Barnes' Court. The building was rebuilt and reopened in 1991 as a luxury heritage hotel with 34 suites, maintained partly by HPTDC and reserved for state dignitaries.

== Architecture ==
The original Peterhoff exemplified the Tudor style with wooden frames, shingles, and a pitched roof set within landscaped grounds. The building was destroyed in a fire on the night of 12 January 1981. In the 1991 reconstruction after being destroyed by fire, Peterhoff was redesigned and reopened in 1991 as a premium heritage hotel managed jointly by HPTDC and the state government. The original hill-station aesthetic was preserved while adapting it for contemporary use as a heritage hotel Interior spaces reflect a blend of grandeur and colonial styling, with large suites, a grand lawn, and period-appropriate detailing. It has 34 suites. It continues to host official functions, including government guest accommodations and tourist stays, and is slated for renovation under an ₹11.5 crore state program announced in 2021.

Recent discussions led by the VHP have even suggested renaming it "Maharishi Valmiki Sadan" to better reflect postcolonial identity. eventeen rooms of the hotel are owned by Himachal Pradesh Tourism Development Corporation (HPTDC) and the rest are reserved for the governor, chief minister, state guests and general administration department.
