= The Cecil =

Historic hotel in Shimla, India

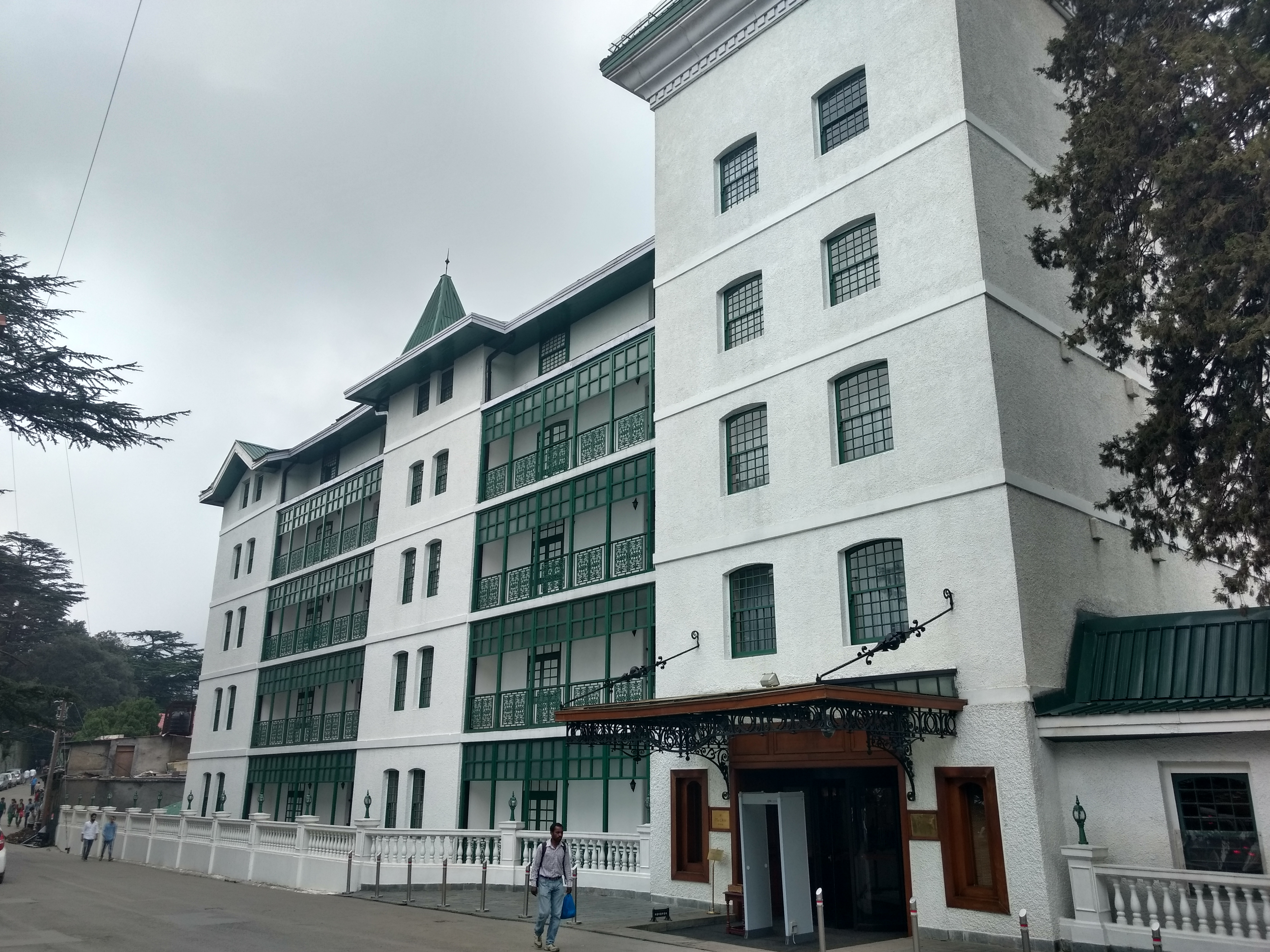
- Cecil front view
- Former names: Tendril Cottage
- Alternative names: The Oberoi Cecil

General information
- Location: Chaura Maidan, Shimla, India
- Coordinates: 31.103212°N 77.154891°E
- Completed: 1883
- Opened: 1884
- Relocated: 1944
- Renovated: 1997
- Owner: Mohan Singh Oberoi (purchased in 1944)

The Cecil is a historic luxury hotel located in the hill station Shimla in the North Indian state of Himachal Pradesh, India. The Cecil's address is at Chaura Maidan, Nabha, Shimla, Himachal Pradesh, 171004, India. At an elevation of 7,000 it sits at the foothills of the Himalayas and overlooks nearby mountains and valleys.

== History ==
The hotel was established in 1884 by the British but was later purchased by one of its employees, Mohan Singh Oberoi, who later founded the Oberoi Hotels group, which presently owns and operates the property

The Cecil had a modest beginning in 1883 as a one-storied house, the Tendril Cottage with its famed inhabitant, Rudyard Kipling. It is claimed that Kipling frequented the house where he wrote his novels, including Plain Tales from the Hills, which was inspired by Shimla. According to folklore, Kipling would book himself into the cottage every summer for five consecutive years, making his journey from Lahore to the British retreat. The author first set foot on The Cecil in the summer of 1883 when he was 17.

== Oberoi acquisition ==
Rai Bahadur Mohan Singh Oberoi came to Shimla while he was a jobless newlywed to find work in the government. However, he was employed at The Cecil in 1922, starting as a worker in the boiler room tasked with weighing coal sacks for the hotel's water heaters. He eventually acquired The Cecil as a part of the acquisition of the Associated Hotels of India in 1944. Oberoi's extensive experience working in the hotel helped him learn the hospitality trade and understand what motivates various classes of hotel guests. Under his ownership, the hotel became a desirable luxury destination

The hotel was closed in 1984 for extensive renovation and refurbishment and was reopened in 1997. The renovation included a heated swimming pool, billiards rooms, and a child activity center. Its sister hotel "Cecil Hotel, Murree" was established in 1850 and was acquired by the Oberoi group in 1945. The hotel is now owned by the Hashwani group in Pakistan.

== Literature ==
- William Warren, Jill Gocher (2007). Asia's legendary hotels: the romance of travel. Singapore: Periplus Editions. ISBN 978-0-7946-0174-4.
