= Christ Church, Shimla =

Anglican church in Shimla, India

Christ Church
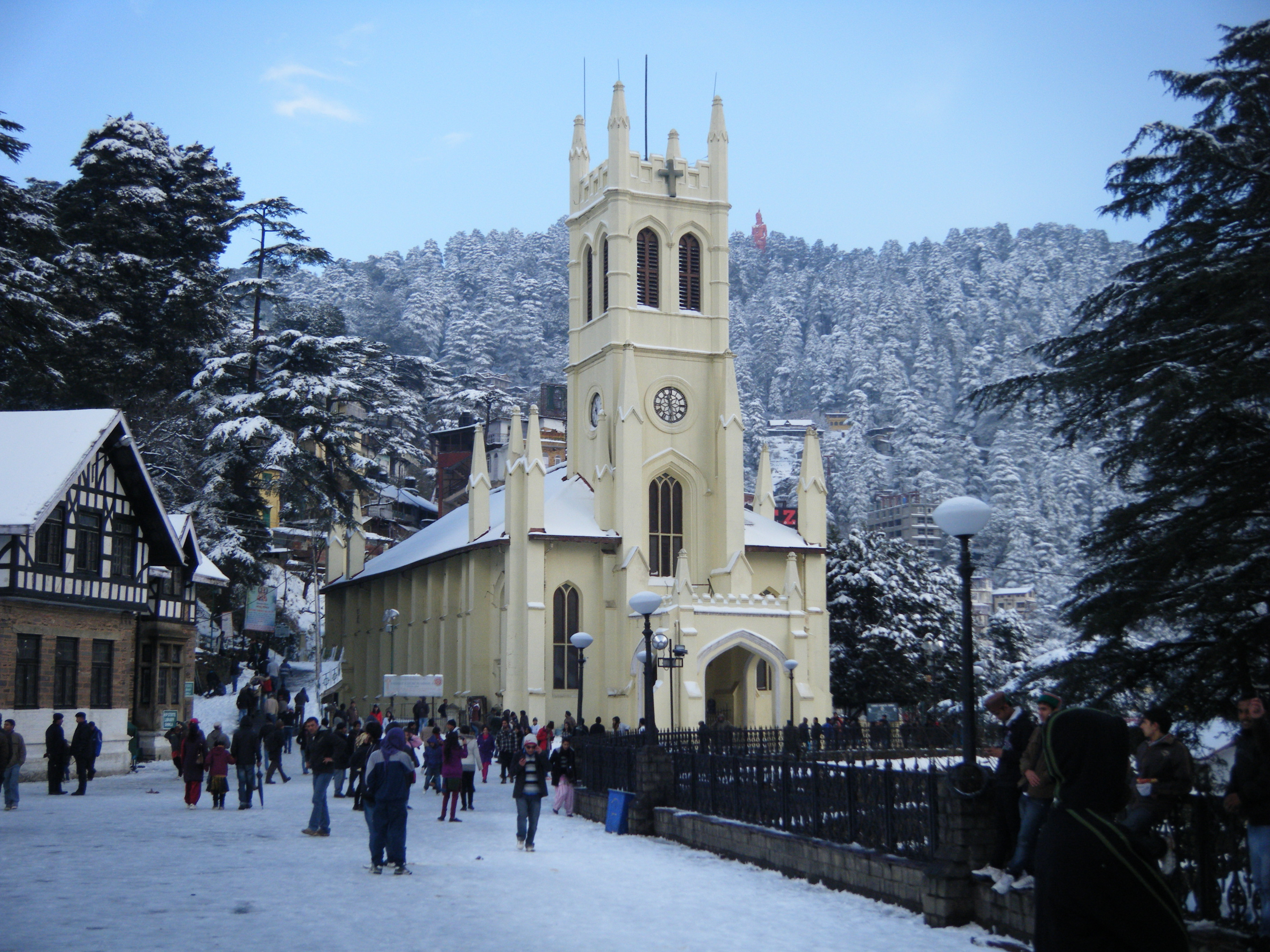
- Christ Church front view

Religion
- Affiliation: Church of North India
- Festival: Christmas

Location
- Location: The Ridge, Shimla
- State: Himachal Pradesh
- Country: India
- Interactive map of Christ Church
- Coordinates: 31.104°N 77.176°E

Architecture
- Architects: John Theophilus Boileau and Lockwood Kipling
- Type: Neo-Gothic
- Established: 1857
- Groundbreaking: 9 September 1844
- Construction cost: 50,000 rupees

Christ Church, Shimla, is the second oldest church in North India, after St John's Church in Meerut. Worship is conducted in Hindi and English. Presently, Rev. Sohan Lal is the head priest of the church.

== History ==
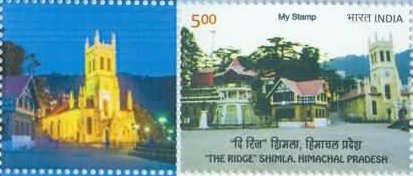
Christ Church depicted on a postage stamp

Shimla was mostly forest when the first Europeans came to the hills in the 1820s. The Europeans sought permission on the Raia of Keonthal, from whose state much of Simla was later carved out, to build residences. Captain (later Major) Charles Kennedy was the Political Agent of the British Government posted in these hill states. He built the first house and the estate known as Kennedy House in late 1820s. Later Lord Amherst, the Governor General came to Simla for a summer trip in the year 1827 and stayed in the Kennedy House. By 1830s about sixty houses were raised for the British and Simla became a health resort.

Built in the neo-Gothic style in 1857 to serve the largely Anglican British community in what was formerly called Simla, Christ Church is situated on The Ridge. It stands out as one of the prominent landmarks of Shimla and its silhouette is visible for many kilometres around the vicinity of Shimla city. Christ Church is one of the enduring legacies of the British Raj.

Stained glass windows at Christ Church (1850), Simla

Christ Church was designed by Colonel J. T. Boileau in 1844, and the cornerstone was laid on 9 September 1844 by Bishop Daniel Wilson, Bishop of Calcutta. The church was consecrated on 10 January 1857 by Bishop Thomas Daltrey, Bishop of Madras. The estimated cost of construction at that time was 40,000 to 50,000 rupees. The clock adorning Christ Church was donated by Colonel Dumbleton in 1860. The porch was added in 1873. A British manufactured pipe-organ was installed in 1899 and extensively renovated in 1932.

On September 11, 1918, Guy Gibson, leader of Operation Chastise, the famous "Dambusters Raid" of 1943, was christened at the church.

Christ Church survived the 20th-century partition and the subsequent political upheavals on the Indian subcontinent. The first Indian Chaplain of Christ Church Shimla was Rev. B.S. Chander (1948 to 1957). Christ Church continues to be well maintained and is in relatively good condition. The clock's original mechanical mechanism has more recently been replaced with an electrical equivalent. However, currently whilst all four faces of the clock remain in synchronization, they rarely reflect the correct time.

== Architecture ==
It is designed in the neo-Gothic style. The church is lit at night to illuminate it.

The church contains five fine stained glass windows. One represents the Christian virtues of Faith, Hope, Charity, Fortitude, Patience, and Humility. The chancel window was designed by Lockwood Kipling (father of Rudyard Kipling). The pipe-organ of Christ Church is the largest in the Indian subcontinent; it was installed in September 1899.

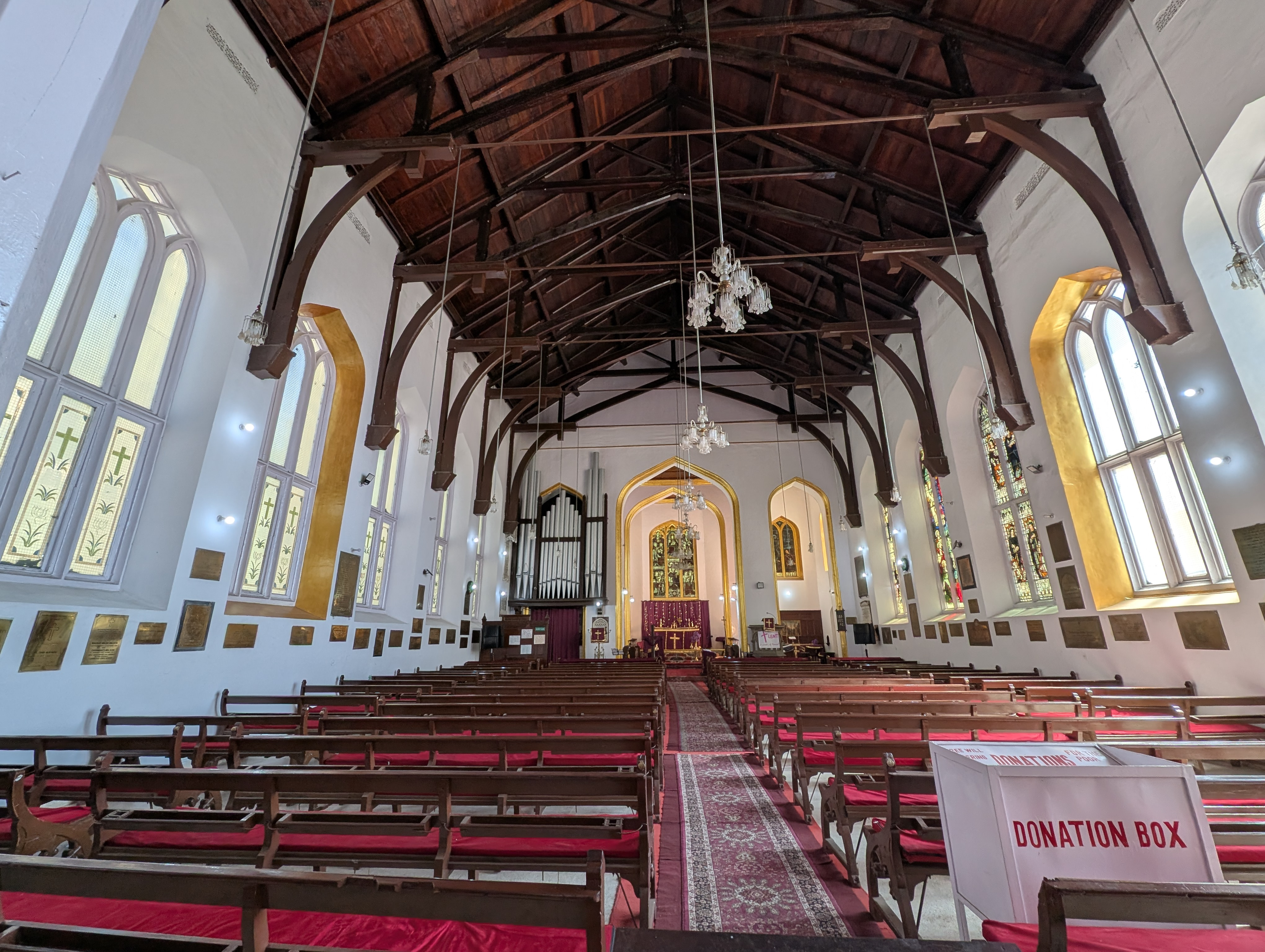
Inside Christ Church, Shimla

Among the church's holdings are a great collection of books and ancient scriptures.
