= Sri Ram =

Indian advocate and Government pledger

Rai Bahadur Sri Ram CIE was an Indian advocate and Government pledger from Lucknow.

He was elected to the Council of India on 3 October 1904 as a non-official member representing the United Provinces. Gopal Krishna Gokhale was also the member to the council.
