= Kaithu, Shimla =

Kaithu Kainthu
- Neighbourhood
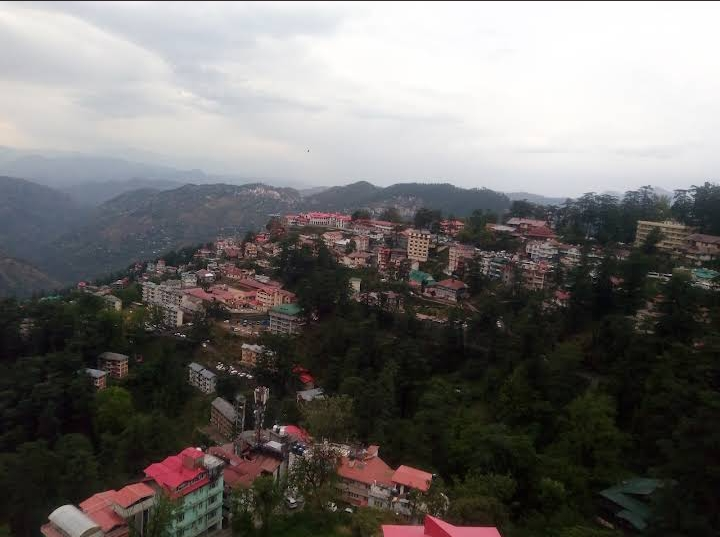
- Kaithu, as viewed from uphill
- Location of Kaithu in Shimla
- Coordinates: 31.112780°N 77.163334°E
- Country: India
- State: Himachal Pradesh
- City: Shimla
- Named for: Coulter pine
- Elevation: 1,928 m (6,325 ft)
- PIN: 171003

Kaithu is a part of Shimla city, in Himachal Pradesh, India. It is near Annadale. The area of Kaithu is highly posh and populated.

== Etymology ==
The region of Kaithu has a lot of Pine trees. This Pine forest was the reason behind the name of the region. In Keonthali dialect of Lower Mahasu Pahari, the local language of the region, the Pine tree's seeds (Coulter pines) are known as Kaintha, they were in abundance there because of the Pine forest. That's why the local people in old times named the area as Kainthu which by the time changed to Kaithu.

== Geography ==
Kaithu is located near Annadale and Cart Road area of Shimla and is one of the major suburbs of Shimla. It is located near 1.5 km an away from Old Bus Stand and same from Shimla Railway Station. It comes under Shimla Municipal Corporation's Ward No.3. Annadale is its close area to hangout. A Gurudwara and a Shiv Mandir is also situated here in Buchail area.

Kaithu is divided into two areas, Upper Kaithu and Lower Kaithu. While Lower Kaithu has the primary health center, Upper Kaithu has the City Police Lines, Public Works Department colonies along with a temple and a H.P. High Court Guest House. Kaithu has three municipal corporation parking, two near Gol Pahari Park and one near Police Lines. Kaithu's area has spread from the Circular Road near Pine View Hotel, below Fingask Estate to Chungi Khana, above Gol Pahari Park.

== Education ==
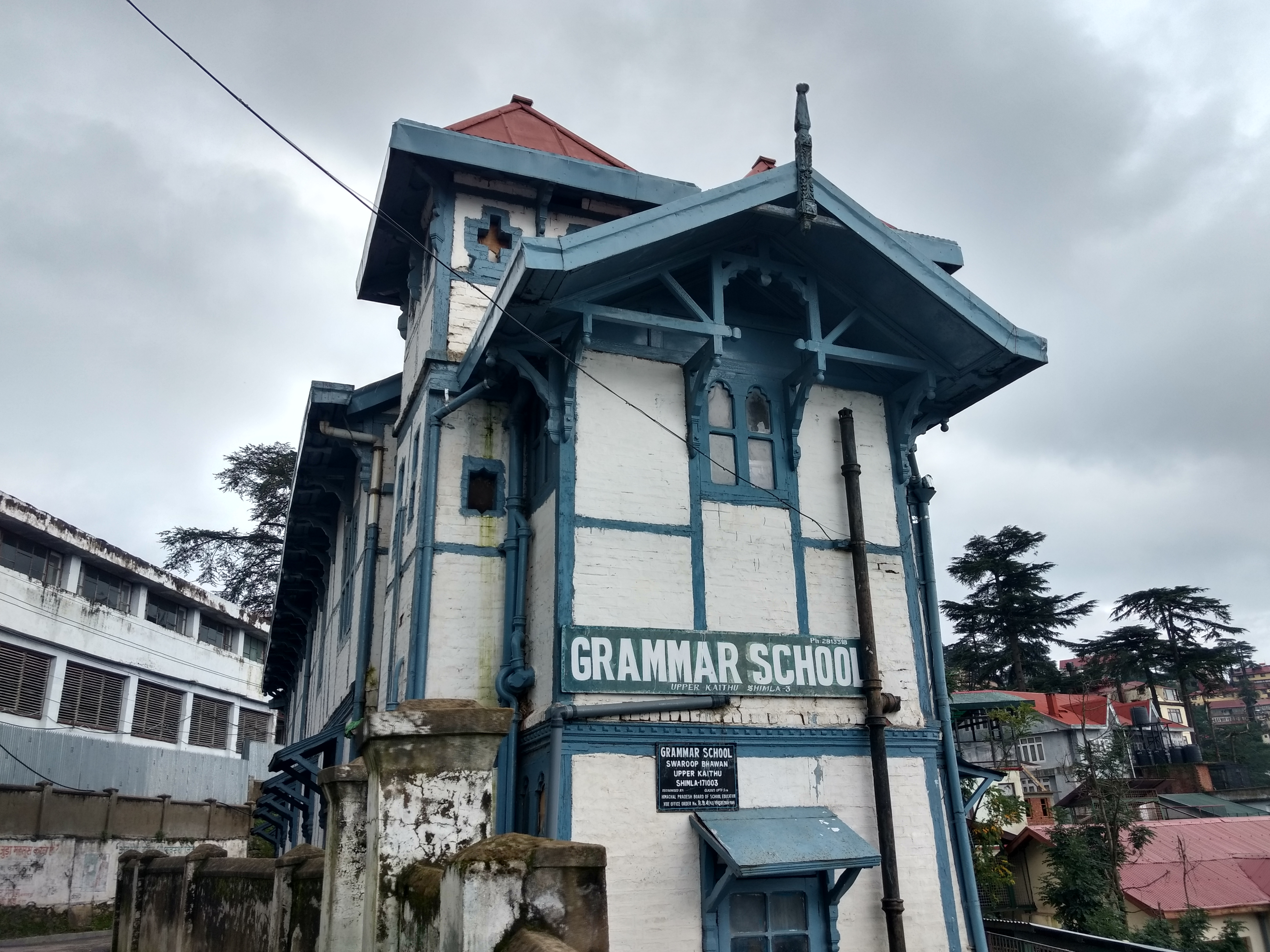
Grammar Public School, Kaithu

Kaithu has a convent school, Loreto Covent Tara Hall, one public school i.e. Grammar Public School and formerly there was another one named Himalayan Public School which has been permanently closed now. In addition, there is one government school i.e. Kaithu High School located at Lower Kaithu.
