= Margaret Douie Dougal =

British chemical publication indexer

Margaret Douie Dougal (1858 or 1859 – 1938, née Robertson, later Chaplin) was a British chemical publication indexer for fifteen years (1885–1909) for the Chemical Society. Dougal contributed to the compilation of volumes i-iii of A Collective Index of the Transactions, Proceedings and Abstracts of the Chemical Society. The then president of the Chemical society, Sir James Dewar, congratulated Dougal for her work as "an example of thoroughness and accuracy to her successors." The collected decennial indices were also prepared by Dougal; at the 1906 Annual Meeting of the Chemical Society it was noted that the Council "had pleasure in expressing the high appreciation of the ceaseless energy displayed by the indexer, Mrs. Margaret Dougal, on the completion of this valuable work."

Under Thomas Edward Thorpe, Dougal conducted inorganic chemistry research of mixed salts of chromium by testing their compositions. Research she conducted also provided insight on the stress and fracturing behavior of iron in Scottish craftsmanship and manufacturing in 1892.

Dougal was born Margaret Douie Robertson in Singapore in 1858 or 1859, the daughter of J.H. Robertson M.D.. She married William Dougal and, after his death, married Arnold Chaplin M.D. F.R.C.P. on 29 July 1909. She died in London on 9 November 1938 at the age of 79.
