= James Douie =

British colonial official (1854–1935)

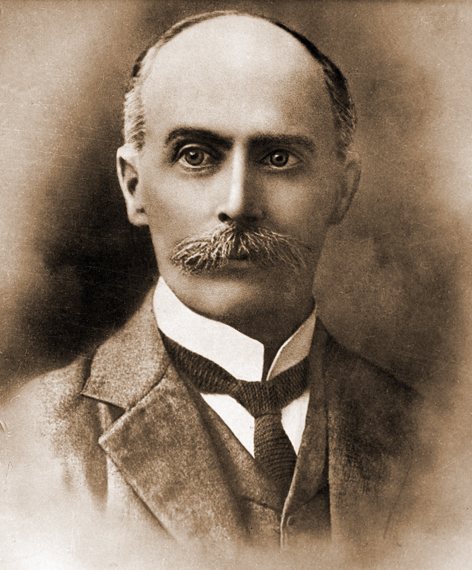
Former Governor of Punjab

Sir James McCrone Douie KCSI (8 March 1854 – 18 March 1935) was a British colonial official who served briefly as Lieutenant Governor of the Punjab in British India.

== Biography ==
Douie was born at Largs, Ayrshire, a son of the Rev. David Buchan Douie who was minister at Largs Free Church. He was educated at the High School and University of Edinburgh. He was appointed to the Indian Civil Service after passing the examination in 1874, and spent the two-year probationary period at Balliol College, Oxford, where he was awarded the Boden Sanskrit scholarship in 1876 but was not able to take a degree. At the end of 1876 he arrived in India where all of his service of 35 years was passed in the Punjab.

Douie became Chief Secretary to the government of the Punjab in 1900, and "had a large share in moulding the famous Land Alienation Act". He became Settlement Commissioner in 1903 and Financial Commissioner in 1909. He officiated as Lieutenant Governor of the Punjab from April to August 1911. He then retired from the service.

Douie was appointed CSI in the 1906 New Year Honours and knighted KCSI at the Delhi Durbar in December 1911. The University of Oxford awarded him an honorary M.A. degree in 1915.

During his service of 35 years he had occupied in turn the most important administrative posts of the [Punjab] Province, maintaining in each of them his reputation for thoroughness and efficiency in his work, knowledge of the people, and courteous dealing with his colleagues. ... He was a man with a precise, well-stored mind and sane judgment. He had wide interests, a most kindly disposition, and a great capacity for friendship.

— The Times obituary

== Publications ==
- Translation of parts of Vespasiano da Bisticci, Vite de uomini illustri del secolo XV, ed. Lodovico Frati (Bologna, 1892-3)
- Panjab Settlement Manual, 1899
- The Panjab, North-West Frontier Province and Kashmir, Cambridge University Press, 1916

== Family ==
In 1885 Douie married Mary, daughter of Charles Roe (later Sir Charles Roe, Chief Justice of the Chief Court of the Punjab). They had two sons and four daughters. Lady Douie died in 1965.
