= The Ridge, Shimla =

The Ridge
- Pedestrian Avenue
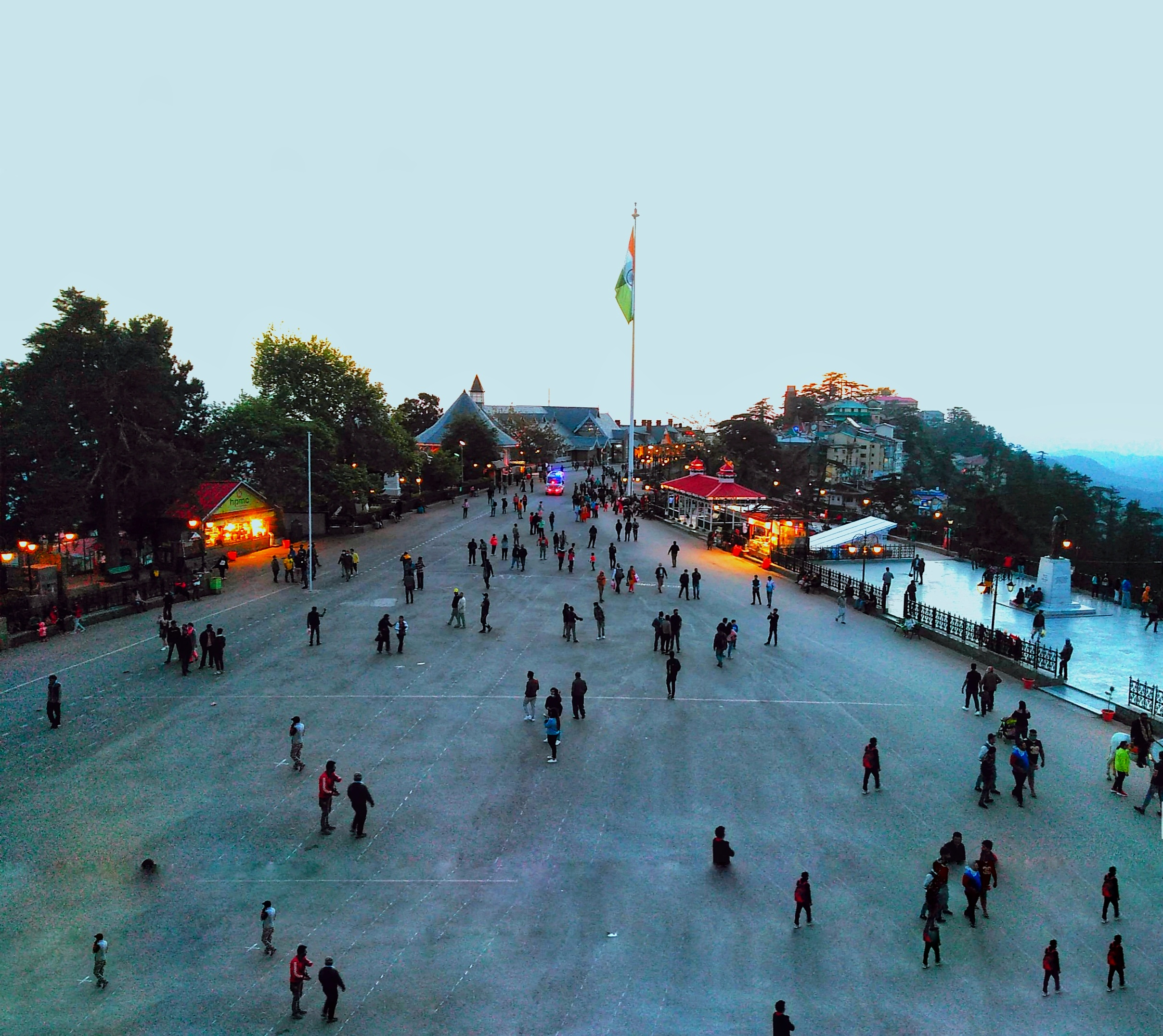
- View of The Ridge from above
- Location of The Ridge in Shimla
- Coordinates: 31.1048°N 77.1751°E
- Country: India
- State: Himachal Pradesh
- City: Shimla
- Highest elevation: 2,206 m (7,238 ft)
- PIN: 171001

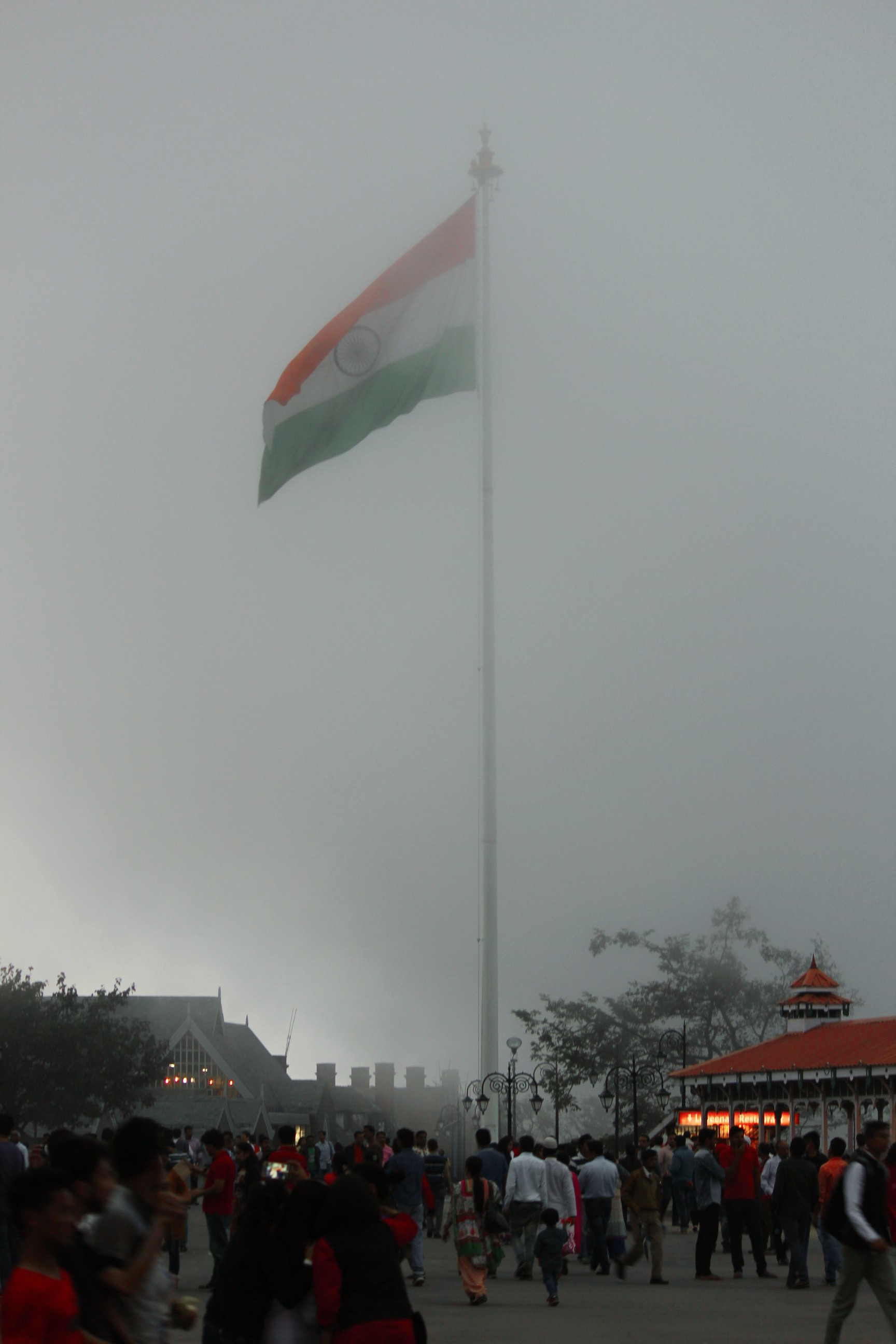
Indian flag Tricolour waving on The Ridge, now shifted near Taka Bench

The Ridge road is a large open space, located in the center of Shimla, the capital city of Himachal Pradesh, India. The Ridge is the hub of all cultural activities of Shimla. It is situated along the Mall Road, the shopping center of Shimla. Most major places of Shimla like Sanjauli Snowdown (IGMC), Mall Road, Jakhu Temple, Oakover, Kali Bari, and Annadale are connected through the Ridge.

It runs east to west alongside the Mall Road, and joins it at the Scandal Point on the west side. On the east side, the Ridge road leads to Lakkar Bazaar, a wooden crafts market.

Prominent landmarks on the Ridge area is Christ Church, a neo-Gothic structure built in 1844 and a Tudorbethan styled library building built in 1910. There are four statues on the ridge; that of Mahatma Gandhi, Indira Gandhi, Dr. Y.S. Parmar the first chief minister of Himachal Pradesh and the recently established statue of Atal Bihari Vajpayee.

== Importance ==
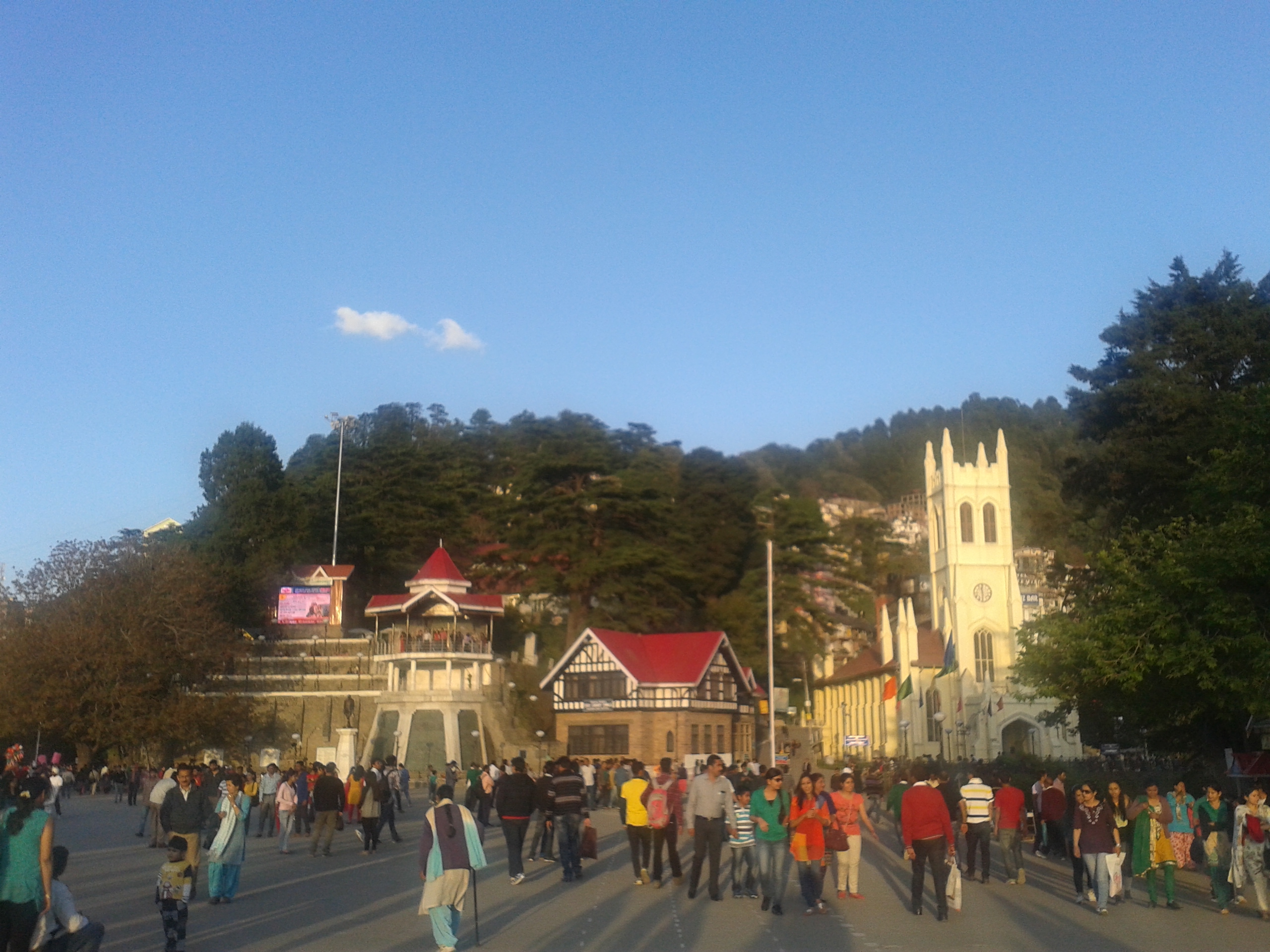
The Ridge Road. Seen in the picture are the Church, and the State library

Underneath the Ridge, large water tanks are placed from which water is supplied to the British era tourist town. The Ridge houses the city's lifeline in terms of the water reservoir, with a capacity of 1,000,000 imp gal (4,500,000 L; 1,200,000 US gal) of water, beneath it. Because these tanks are significantly large in size, they have been used as the main water supply for Shimla. The reservoir is stated to have been constructed in the 1880s, without using any cement and only lime mortar was used.

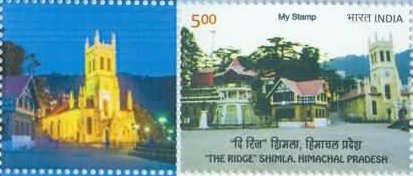
A 2018 India Post stamp featuring The Ridge

The Ridge is famous for the various government functions and fairs that are held here. It is usually the venue for all such celebrations and events. The most famous festival that is held at the Ridge is the Summer Festival. This famous festival is held during the months of April or May and the whole of Shimla comes alive with colors and a riot of activities. Prominent landmarks on The Ridge include Christ Church, a neo-Gothic structure built in the 1850s, and a Tudorbethan-styled library building.
