= Charles Pratt Kennedy =

Founder of Shimla

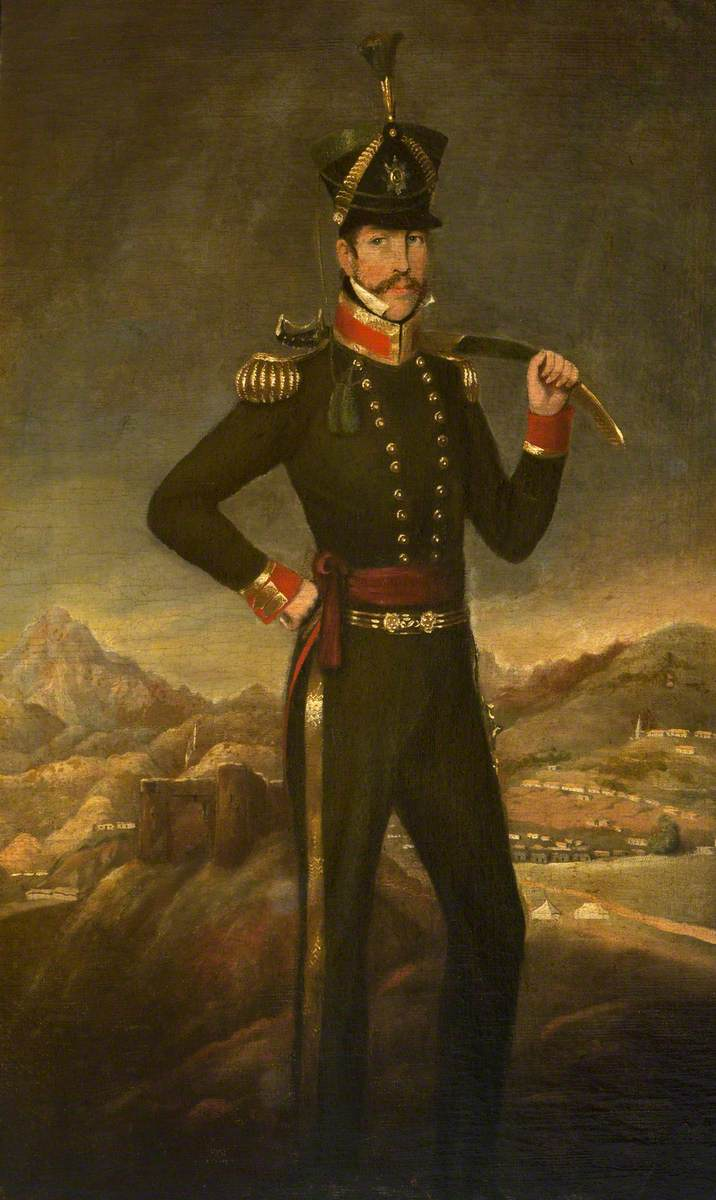
- Born: 1789
- Died: 25 May 1875 (aged 85–86) Cheltenham
- Allegiance: United Kingdom
- Branch: Bengal Artillery (later Royal Artillery)
- Service years: 1808–1868
- Rank: Lieutenant-colonel
- Spouse: Charlotte Unett

Lieutenant-Colonel Charles Pratt Kennedy (1789 – 25 May 1875) was an officer in the Bengal Artillery (later Royal Artillery) from 1808 to 1865. He is considered the founder of Shimla, summer capital of British India and now the capital city of Himachal Pradesh. He built the first house in Shimla in 1822 and named it Kennedy house.
