= Edward FitzGerald Law =

British diplomat (1846–1908)

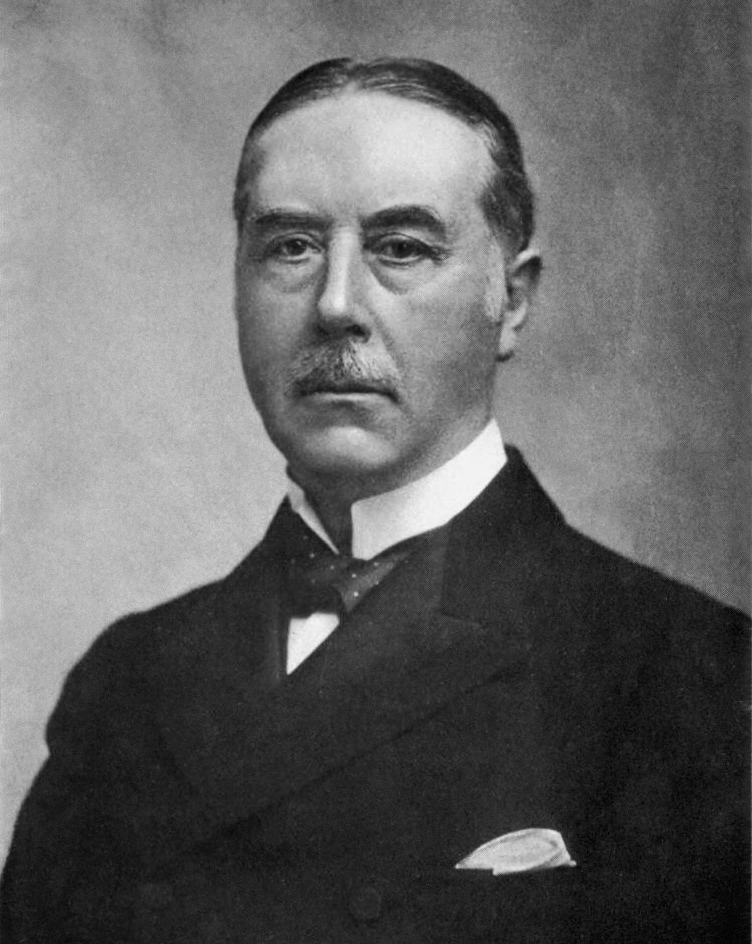
Sir Edward FitzGerald Law, British diplomat

Sir Edward FitzGerald Law KCMG KCSI (2 November 1846 – 2 November 1908) was a British diplomat and expert in state finance.

== Early life ==
Born at Rostrevor House, County Down, on 2 November 1846, he was third of the nine children of Michael Law, senior partner of Law and Finlay's bank, Dublin, and afterwards director of the Bank of Ireland, by his wife Sarah Anne, daughter of Crofton FitzGerald. His eldest brother, Robert, lived on his Irish estates. His second brother, Michael, was an early member of the international courts in Egypt. Law went to schools at Brighton and St. Andrews, and thence to the Royal Military Academy, Woolwich. He was gazetted to the Royal Artillery in July 1868, and served in India. There he became known as a sportsman and a fine steeple-chaser, while his instinct for topography and linguistic aptitude in French, German, and Russian promised well for a military career. But, invalided home, he retired from the army for private reasons in October 1872, keeping his name on the reserve of Officers.

== Russia and London ==
Going to Russia, he next started business there as an agent for agricultural machinery and, after mastering many difficulties, prospered until he was ruined by the conduct of his partners, against whom he brought legal proceedings. Thereupon he joined Messrs. Hubbard, the English firm of Russian merchants, and in their behalf visited every part of the Russian empire. His intimate knowledge of the country and the people was turned to account in a long series of magazine articles on Russian ambitions in Central Asia.

From December 1880 to March 1881, and from August to September 1881, Law acted as consul at St. Petersburg. In 1883 he declined the offer of a post which the war office was asked by King Leopold II to fill in the Belgian service in Central Africa (see Stanley, Sir Henry Morton) and he accepted the managership of the Globe Telephone Company in London. That company was then fighting the United Telephone Company. Law pushed through a scheme of amalgamation in the interests of the shareholders in 1884, and thereby abolished his own post.

== Sudan ==
Volunteering for duty in the war against the Mahdi in Sudan in 1885, he served with the commissariat and transport staff of the guards' brigade. He received the medal and clasp and the Khedive's Bronze Star, was mentioned in despatches, and promoted to the rank of major (June 1886). He was meanwhile recalled to England for work in the army intelligence department in connection with troubles with Russia over the Penjdeh incident on the Afghan frontier.

After visiting Manchuria to develop the services of the Amur River Navigation Company, he was associated with Colonel E. J. Saunderson in the anti-home rule campaign of the Irish Loyal and Political Union. Of inventive mind, he patented a machine for setting up type at a distance by the transmission of electric impulses, and a flying machine, the precursor of the aeroplane.

== Diplomat ==
In January 1888 Law was posted to St. Petersburg as commercial and financial attache for Russia, Persia, and the Asiatic provinces of Turkey. He rendered valuable service to the English ambassador, Sir Robert Morier. After visiting Persia in the course of 1888, he was attached next summer to Nasiruddin, Shah of Persia, on his visit to England. In 1890 he acted as British delegate for negotiation of a commercial treaty with Turkey. In 1892 he went to Greece to make an exhaustive inquiry into the financial situation there, his report appearing early in 1893. In March 1894 he was promoted to a commercial secretaryship in the diplomatic service. After a riding tour all through Asian parts of the Ottoman Empire he reported on railway development there in October 1895, and was the first to suggest British association with Germany in the Baghdad Railway and British control of the section from Baghdad to the Persian Gulf; that policy he advocated to the end of his life.

In December 1896 Law was transferred as commercial secretary to Vienna with supervision of Austria-Hungary, Russia, Italy, Greece, and the Balkan States. In that capacity he, with Francis Elliot, British minister at Sofia, negotiated a commercial treaty with Bulgaria in the winter of 1896–7. He represented Great Britain at Constantinople on the international committee for determining the indemnity payable by Greece after her war with Turkey in 1897. His influence helped to keep the amount within reasonable limits, and in the autumn he served at Athens on the international commission for the due payment of the indemnity and the regulation of Greek finance.

When the International Financial Commission was founded in 1898, Law was unanimously elected president. He devised an ingenious system of consolidation of revenues, which rendered the international commission acceptable and useful to Greece, and he won a high place in the affections of the people throughout the country. While engaged on the business he was created a K.C.M.G. in May 1898, and given the rank of resident minister in the diplomatic service. He declined the Grand Cross of the Grecian Order of the Saviour and other foreign decorations. At the close of 1898 he went to Constantinople to represent British, Belgian, and Dutch bondholders on the council of the Ottoman debt.

== India ==
In March 1900 Law went out to India as finance member of the government and took wide views of his responsibilities. He lost no time in completing the currency reform begun in 1893, setting aside the large profits from rupee coinage to form a gold standard reserve fund as a guarantee for stability of exchange. A great famine was afflicting the country when he took office, but a period of prosperity followed, and notwithstanding the cost of the many administrative improvements which Lord Curzon effected. Law was able to write off heavy arrears of land revenue and to make the first serious reduction of taxation for twenty years. The limit of income-tax exemption was raised from Rs. 500 to Rs. 1000 per annum, and the salt tax – the burden of which upon the masses had been a subject of perennial criticism of government (see History of the British salt tax in India) – was reduced from 2 Rupees 8 annas. (equivalent to 3s. 4d.) to Rs. 2 per maund. In the budget of 1905–6, promulgated after Law left office, but for the framing of which he was mainly responsible, the salt tax underwent a further reduction of 8 annas., and the district boards (roughly corresponding to the English county councils) received a material annual subvention. One of Law's useful reforms was to give the local governments a larger interest in the revenue and expenditure under their control – a principle which was permanently adopted and extended later. As Lord Curzon testified, Law came into closer touch with the commercial community than any predecessor. To projects like the Tata iron and steel works at Sakchi, Bengal (see Jamsetji Tata), he gave earnest encouragement, and he eagerly advocated the new system of co-operative rural credit under government supervision initiated in 1904.

Law resigned his membership of the council on 9 January 1905, some three months before the completion of his term. He dissented from the views of the viceroy in his controversy with Lord Kitchener over army administration, and on coming home served on the committee appointed by the secretary of state in May 1905 to make recommendations on the subject. This report advised changes, which led to Lord Curzon's resignation (East India Army Administration, 1905, Cd. 2718).

To a despatch (22 Oct 1903) of Lord Curzon's government deprecating participation in the imperial preference policy, which Joseph Chamberlain had begun to advocate, Law appended a dissenting minute. Law's minute was used in party discussions in Great Britain and the colonies, and was cited with approval by Alfred Deakin, prime minister of Australia at the 1907 Imperial Conference (Official Report of Conf. 1907).

Law was appointed a Companion of the Order of the Star of India (CSI) in the 1903 Durbar Honours, and promoted to a Knight Commander of the same order (KCSI) in the 1906 New Year Honours.

== After India ==
On return home, Law became a vice-president of the Tariff Reform League, and actively championed its policy.

Law represented Great Britain on the Cretan reform commission in January 1906, and on the committee which sat in Paris under the provisions of the Act of Algeciras (April 1906) to found the bank of Morocco. Appointed English censor of the bank, he paid thenceforth a fortnightly visit to Paris. Law, who was also connected with many financial enterprises in the City of London, died in Paris on 2 November 1908, his sixty-second birthday. He was buried at Athens on 21 Nov with the public and military honours due to a Grand Cross of the Order of the Saviour. A central street of Athens is named after him, and tablets to his memory are to be unveiled in the British chapel at Athens, and in St. Patrick's Cathedral, Dublin. In a chapter contributed to his Life, Mr. J. L. Garvin describes him as 'fearing no responsibility yet able to show himself ... a safe and dexterous tactician, and audacious in instinct, prudent in method, and yet full of emotional strength, of passionate possibilities, and all manner of great-heartedness.' He married on 18 October 1893 Catherine only daughter of Nicholas Hatsopoulo, a prominent member of an old Byzantine family, who had long owned property in Attica, and had established themselves in Athens on the erection of the Greek kingdom. There were no children of the union.
