= Kuthar =

Town situated in Solan district, Himachal Pradesh

- Town
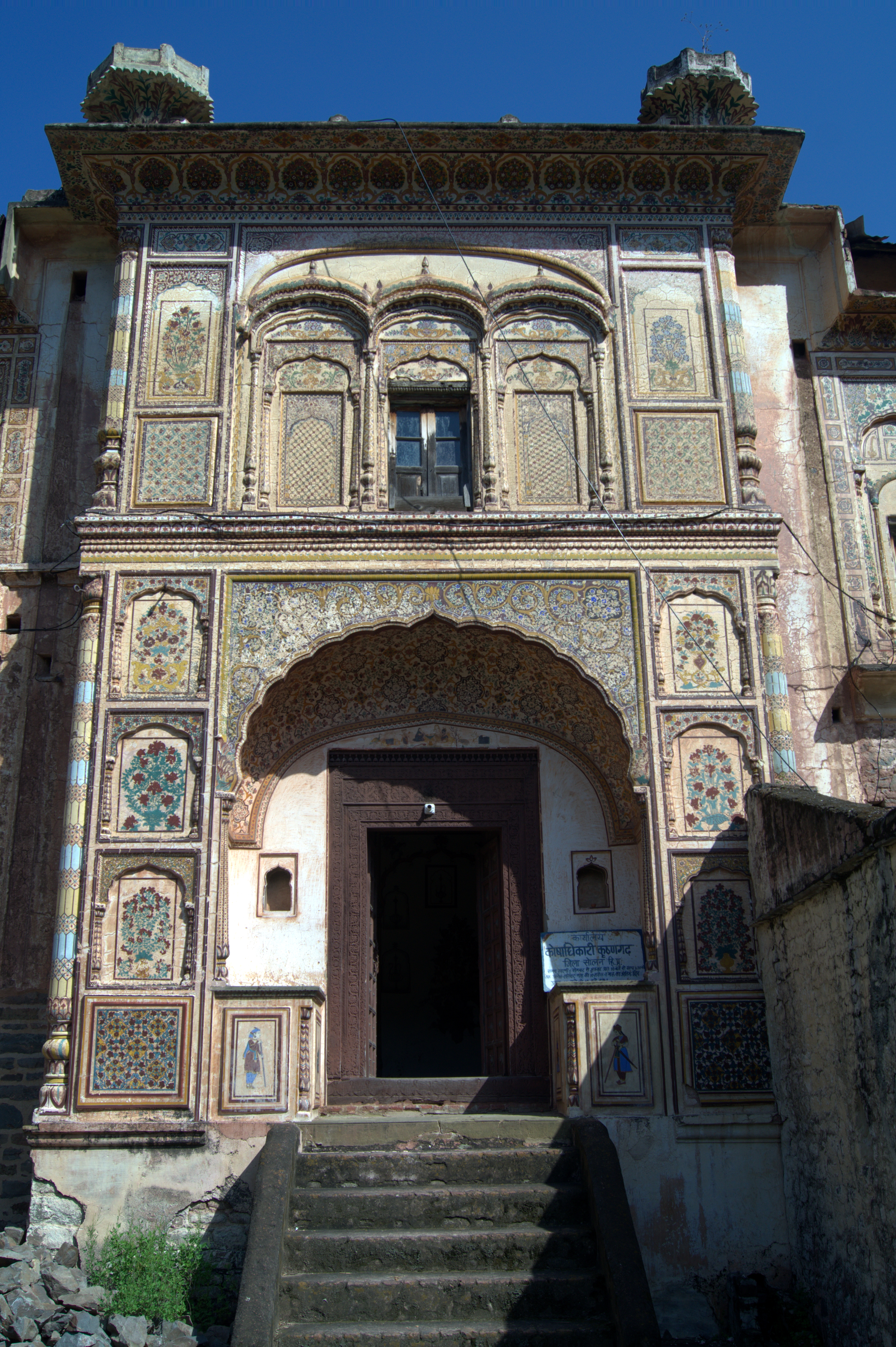
- Kuthar Palace

- Location within Himachal Pradesh Location within India
- Coordinates: 30°58′22″N 76°58′00″E
- Country: India
- State: Himachal Pradesh
- District: Solan

Languages
  - Official: Hindi
  - Native: Mahasui (Baghati)
- PIN: 171226

Kuthar, formerly Krishangarh, is a settlement located in the Solan district of Himachal Pradesh, India. Kuthar is situated on the MDR-75 (Shalaghat–Arki–Kunihar–Kuthar–Patta–Barotiwala road, previously known as State Highway-9) adjoining Sabathu and Kasauli. Kuthar is an administrative division of Solan district having sub-tehsil status.

== History ==
Kuthar was a princely state of the British Raj. It was one of the several states of the Punjab States Agency.

The state of Kuthar was founded in the 17th century. It was occupied by Nepali forces during drive of Himalayas from 1803 to 1815.

== Rulers ==
The rulers bore the title of rana.

- 1803: Gopal Singh
- 1815–1858: Bhup Singh
- 1858–1896: Jai Chand
- 1896–1930: Jagjit Chand
- 1930 – 15 August 1947: Krishna Chand (born 1905)

== Gallery ==
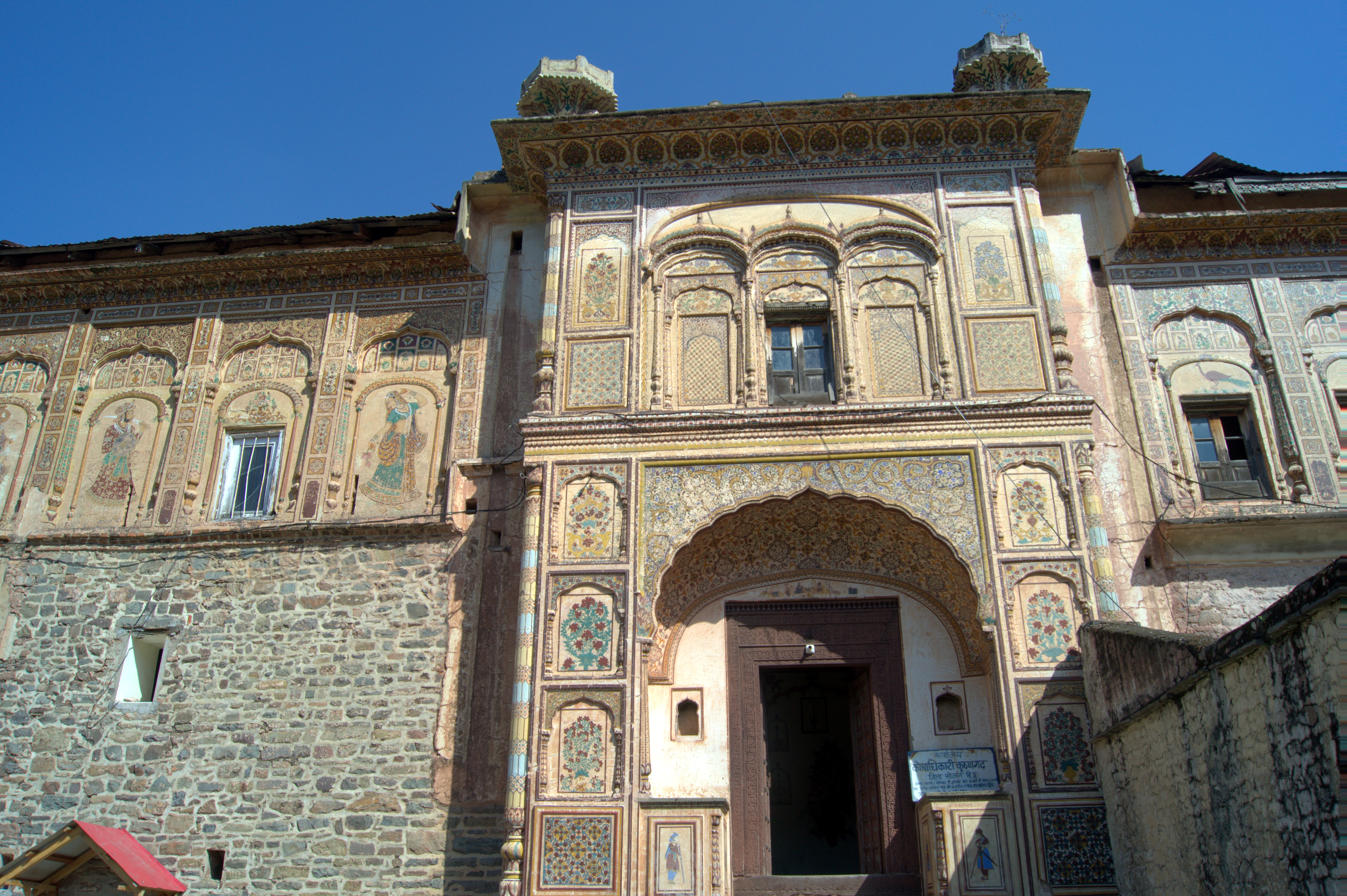
A view of the palace

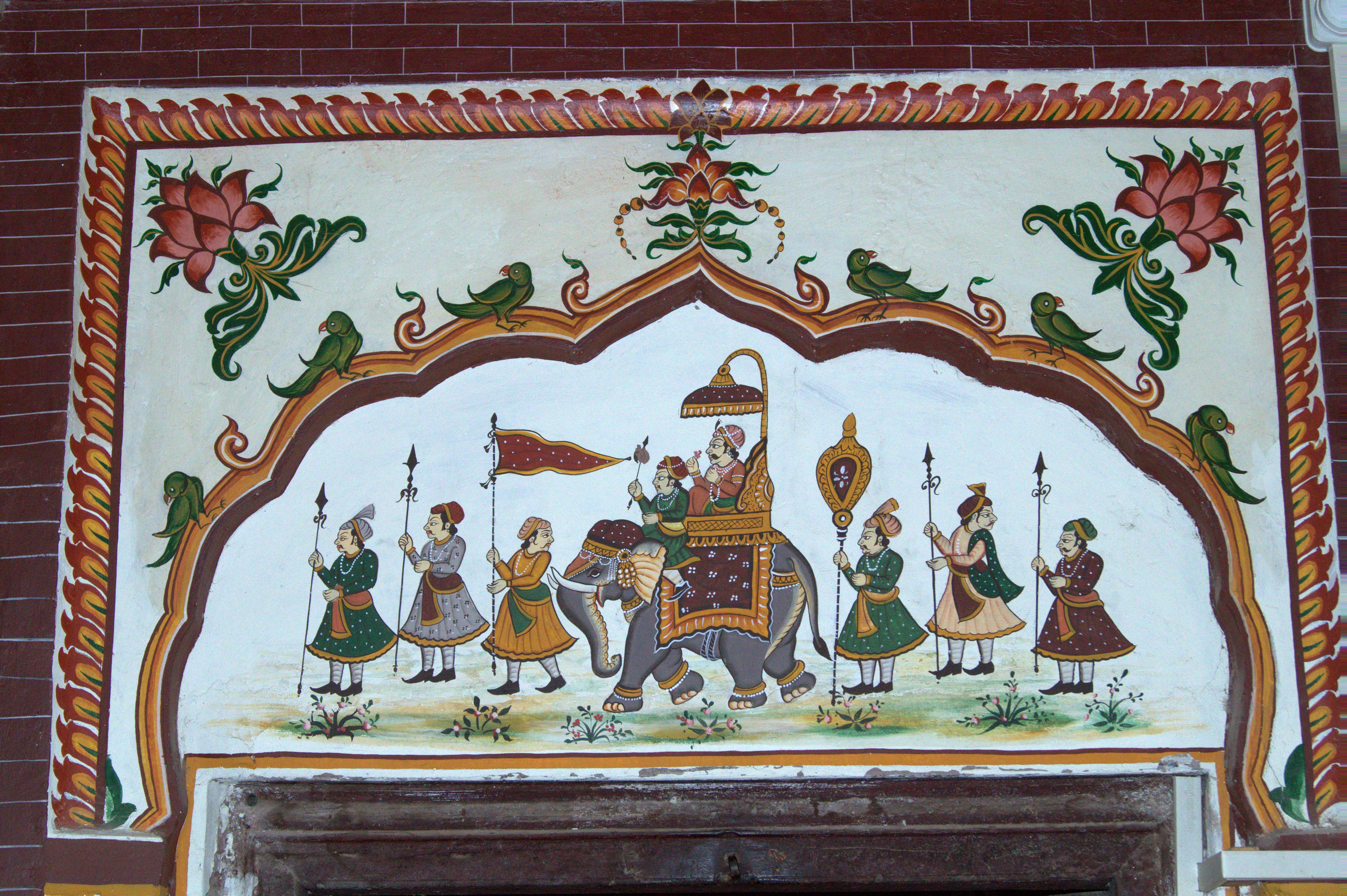
Wall painting, Kuthar palace

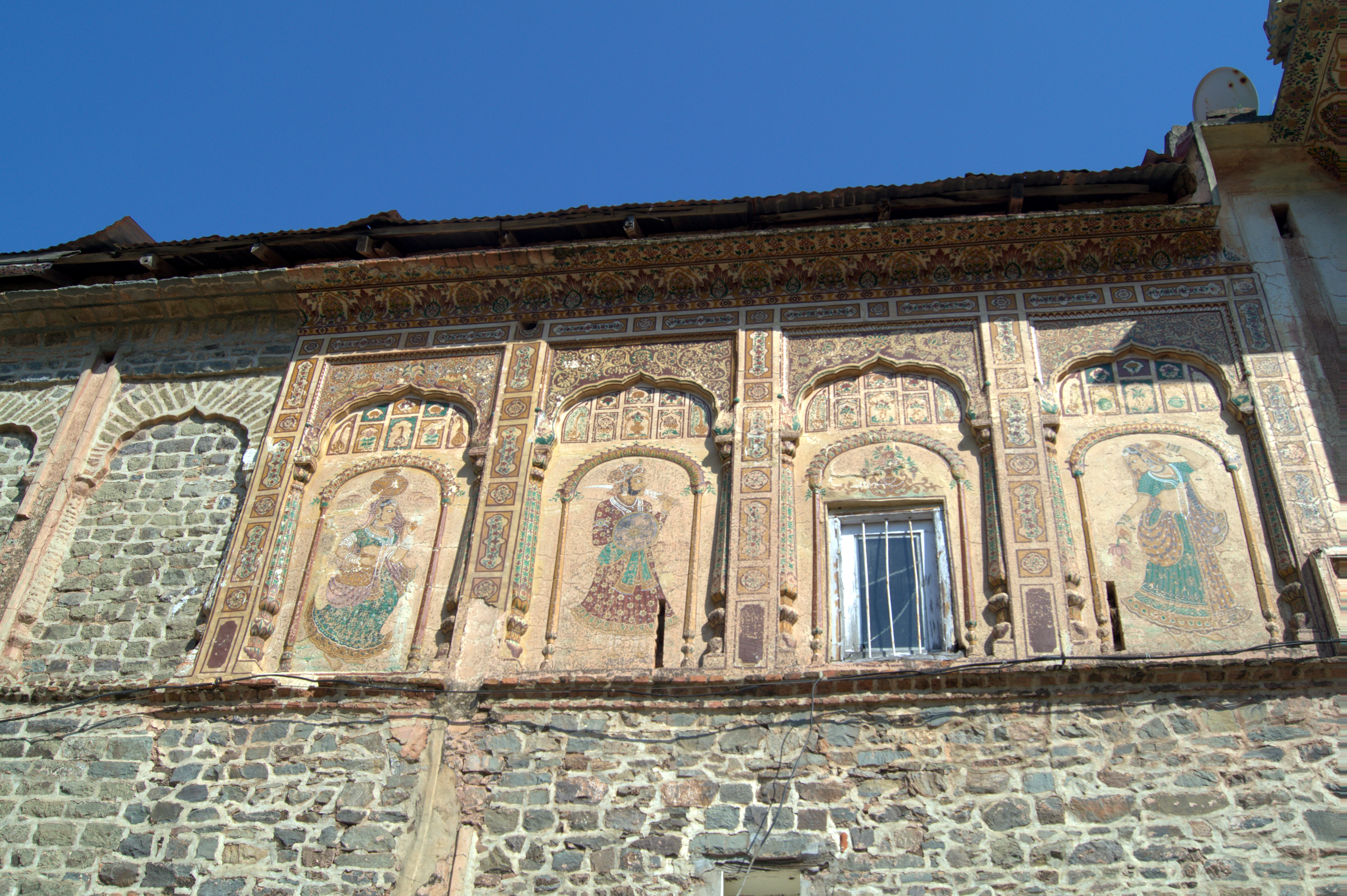
Architecture and art work of the palace of Kuthar

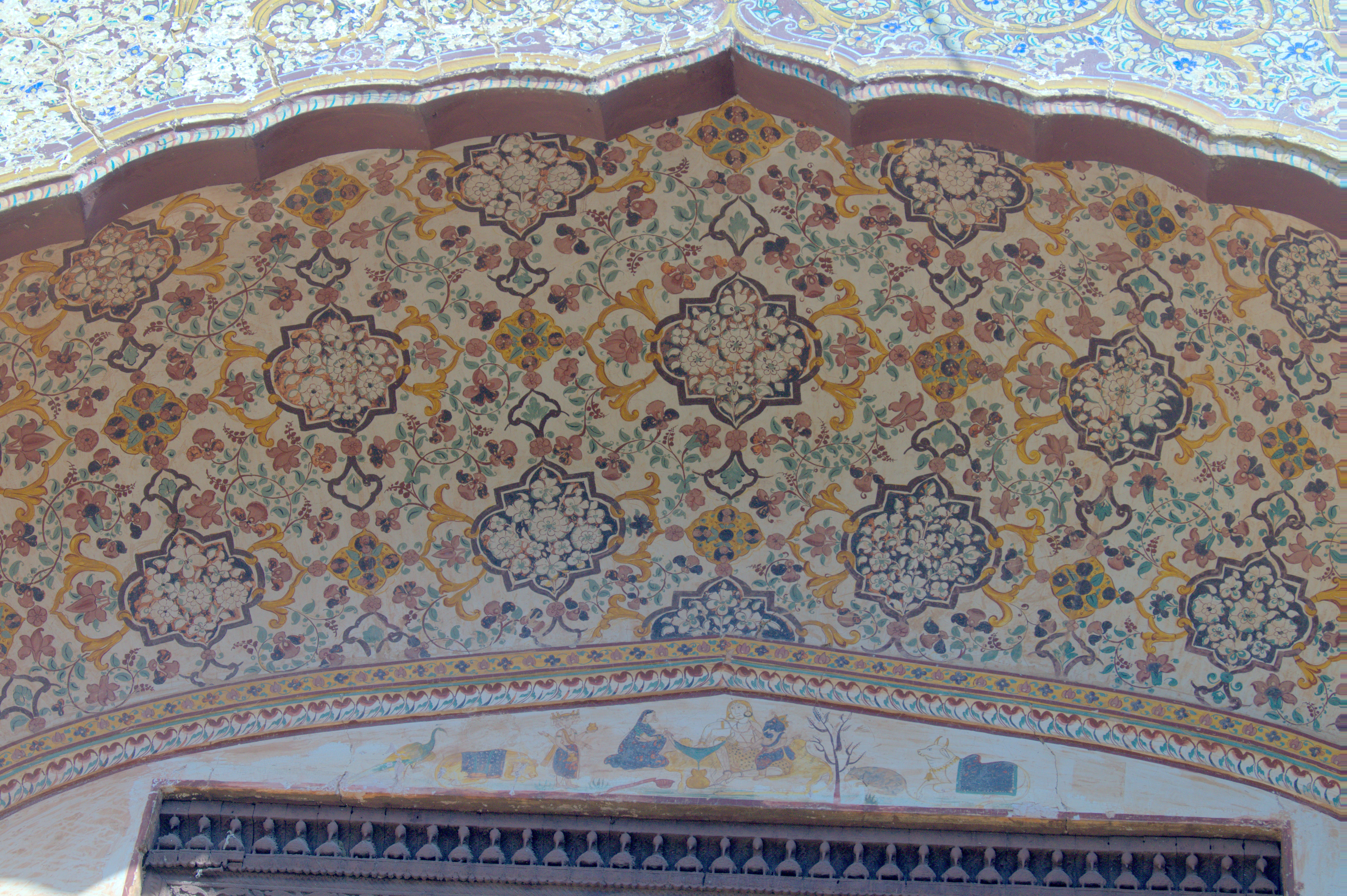
Art work on the entrance of the palace of Kuthar

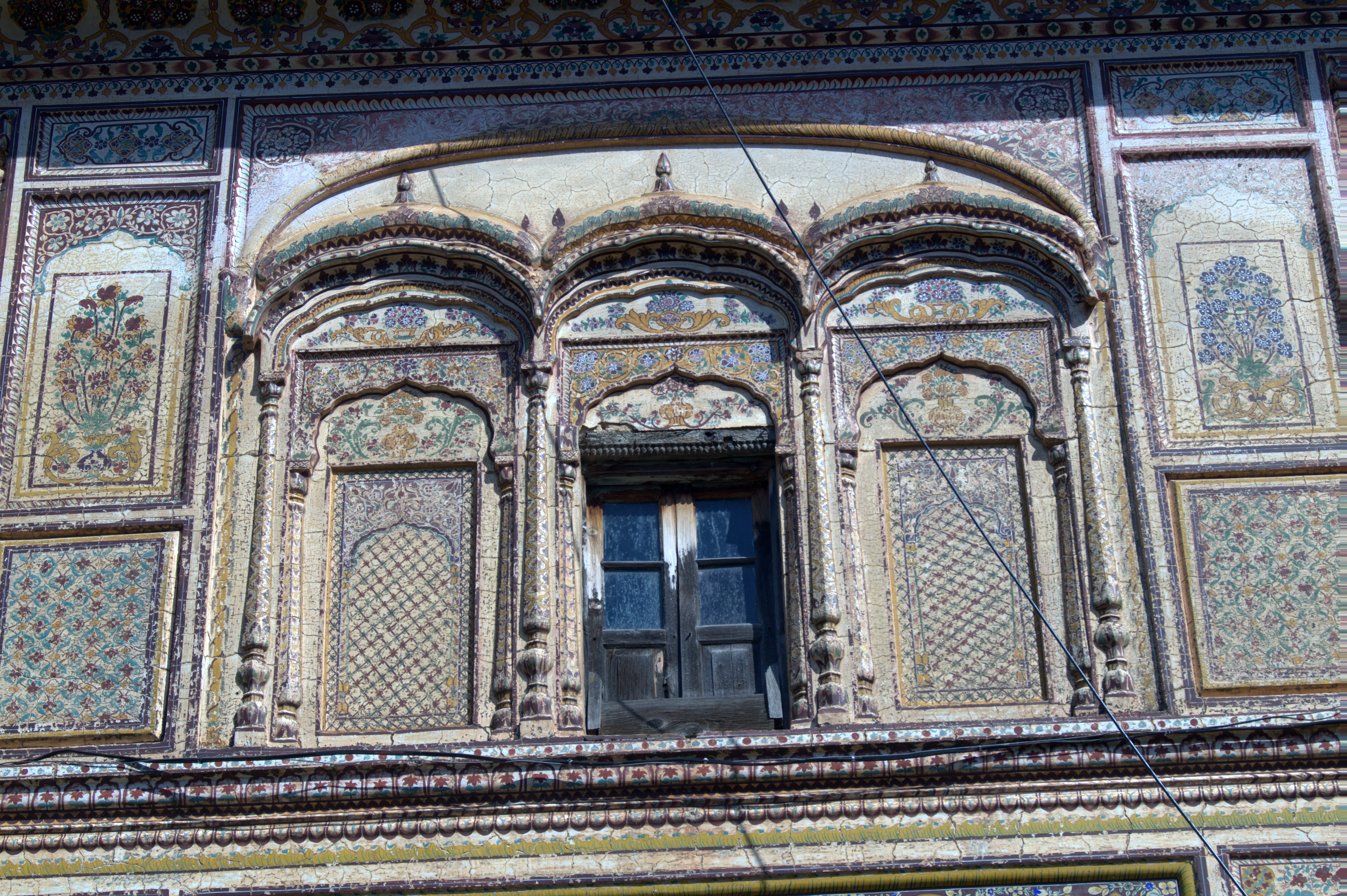
Art work on the outer walls of the palace of Kuthar

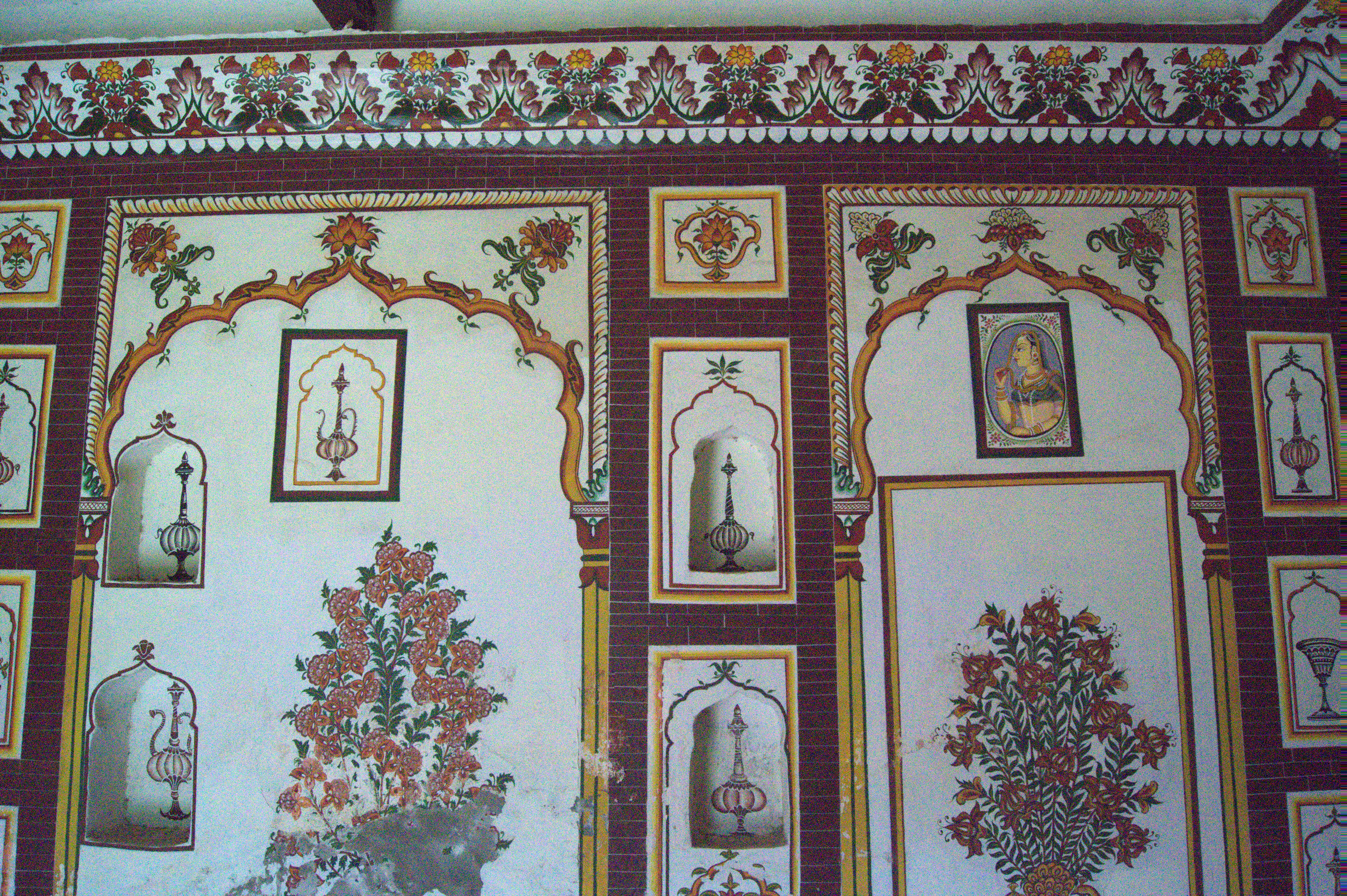
Interior wall paintings on the palace of Kuthar

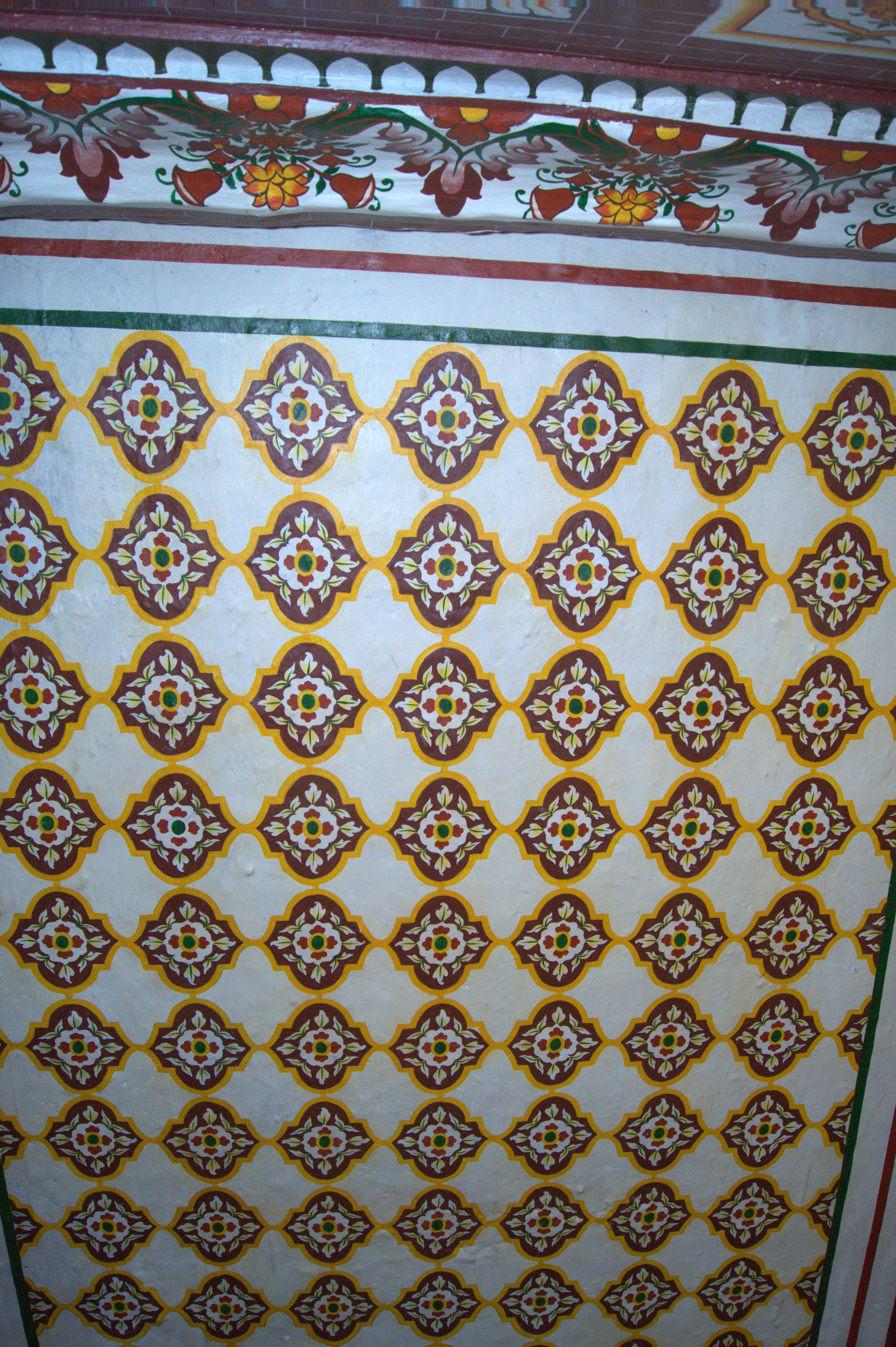
Interior art work on the roof of Kuthar palace

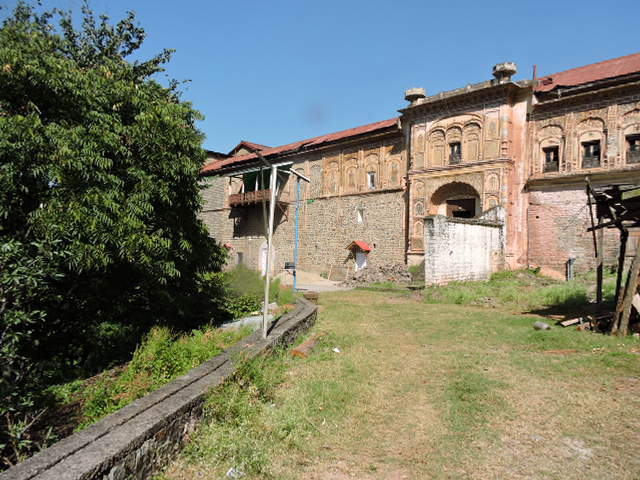
Kuthar Palace

== See also ==
1. http://www.worldstatesmen.org/India_princes_K-W.html
2. https://masalamug.com/kuthar-hideout-in-himachal/
