= Kiarighat =

Hill station in Himachal Pradesh, India

- Suburb
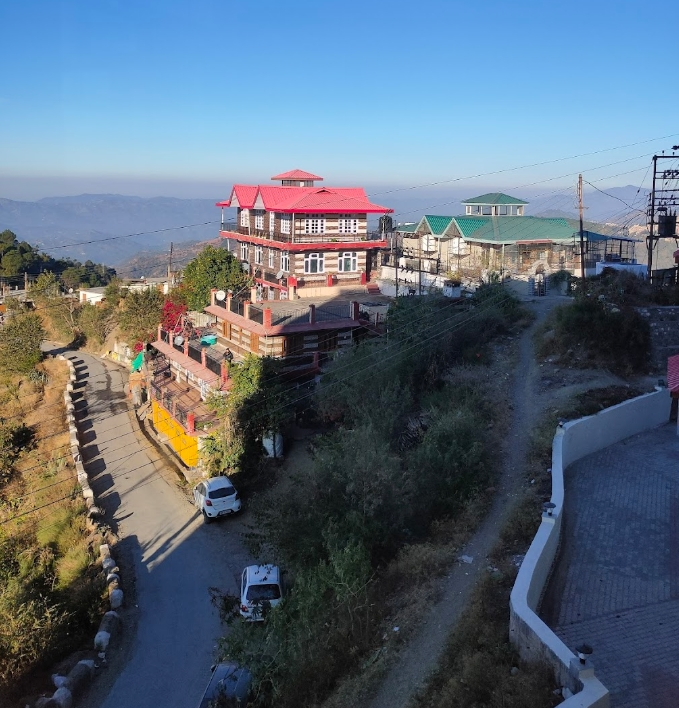
- Scenic views from Hotel HPTDC Meghdoot in Kiarighat

- Location in Himachal Pradesh Kiarighat (India)
- Coordinates: 30°59′53″N 77°05′16″E
- Country: India
- State: Himachal Pradesh
- District: Solan
- Elevation: 1,637.8 m (5,373 ft)

Languages
  - Official: Hindi
  - Native: Mahasui (Baghati)
- PIN: 173234

Kiarighat, Himachal Pradesh, India, is a small hill station situated at Kalka-Shimla National Highway, where tourists can stay for a while or stay overnight. The Jaypee university is located at about 8 km from here.

== Accessibility ==
Kiarighat is connected by Shimla-Kalka National Highway. It is 27 km away from Shimla and 19 km from Solan. The nearest Airport in Jubbarhatti and nearest railway station is Kandaghat at Kalka-Shimla railway.

== Climate ==
In winter, the temperature can drop near to freezing point when heavy woolens are required and in summers, light woolens / cottons are recommended.
