= Tarol =

- Location in Himachal Pradesh Tarol (India)
- Coordinates: 30°50′50″N 77°04′18″E
- Country: India
- State: Himachal Pradesh
- District: Solan
- Tehsil: Kasauli

Government
  - Type: Parliamentary Constituency

Area
  - Total: 85 ha (210 acres)

Population (2019)
  - Total: 176

Languages
  - Official: Hindi
  - Native: Mahasui (Baghati)
- Time zone: India Standard Time
- Postal code: 173229

Tarol is a village located in the region of Kasauli in Himachal Pradesh, India. It comes under the Kasauli assembly & Shimla parliamentary constituency. It is located in the Solan district of the Indian state, Himachal Pradesh.

The region is essentially hilly. It is located 8 km southwest of Solan and 38 km away from the district headquarter, Kasauli.

== Geography ==
The total geographical area of Tarol is 85 hectares. It is a hilly rural region located within the cantonment and town of Kasauli in the Solan district of the Indian state, Himachal Pradesh. It officially comes under the Kasauli assembly & Shimla parliamentary constituency. The nearest town to Tarol in Dagshai.

== Demographics ==
As of 2019 statistics, Tarol has a population of 176 people in 34 houses. The total number of males is 90, and the number of females is 86. Children with age 0-6 are 14, which makes up 7.95% of the total population of the village.

According to Census reports, Tarol has 956 Females per 1000 males out of the 176 total population of the village. There are 1000 girls per 1000 boys if the population under six years is considered.

== Literacy rate in Tarol ==
The Literacy rate in Tarol is 85.8%, considering the population density of the region. Male literacy is 91.57%, and for females, the rate of literacy is 79.75%.

== History ==
Tarol is an emerging region in Himachal Pradesh, being located in Kasauli.

== Transports ==
Public bus service is available within the region of Tarol within a distance of 5 km. The railway is available in Tarol within 10+ km within distance.
