= Darlaghat =

- Village
- Darlaghat
- Location in Himachal Pradesh, India Darlaghat (India)
- Coordinates: 31°14′28″N 76°56′9″E
- Country: India
- State: Himachal Pradesh
- District: Solan

Government
  - Type: Village Panchayat
  - Body: Gram Sabha

Area
  - Total: 157 km^{2} (61 sq mi)
- Elevation: 1,600–2,000 m (5,200–6,600 ft)

Population (2021)
  - Total: About 37,000
- Demonym: Darla

Languages
  - Official: Hindi
  - Native: Mahasui (Baghliani)
- Time zone: UTC+5:30 (IST)
- PIN: 171102
- Telephone code: 01796
- Vehicle registration: HP 11 (arki)

Darlaghat is a village panchayat in Solan district in the state of Himachal Pradesh, India. It is famous for its Ambuja Cement plant. It is situated on Darlaghat Mountain ranges of Arki at an altitude ranging from 1,800–2,000 metres (5,900–6,600 ft). Shimla-Bilaspur-Kangra National Highway passes from center of the village. Its name is derived from a fruit called as Daru (Wild Sour Pomegranate). Daru grows naturally in the vast tract of mid Himalayan hill slopes of Jammu and Kashmir, Himachal Pradesh and Uttarakhand.

It is famous for the school DAV AVN.

== Climate ==
In winter, the temperature can drop near to freezing point. In summer cotton clothes are recommended.

Winter is from November to March or early April Summer is from April to June / July Precipitation can occur during any time of the month but highly likely to be in months from May to January.

It has high rainfall relative to its location, helped by recent deforestation activity.

== Places of interest ==
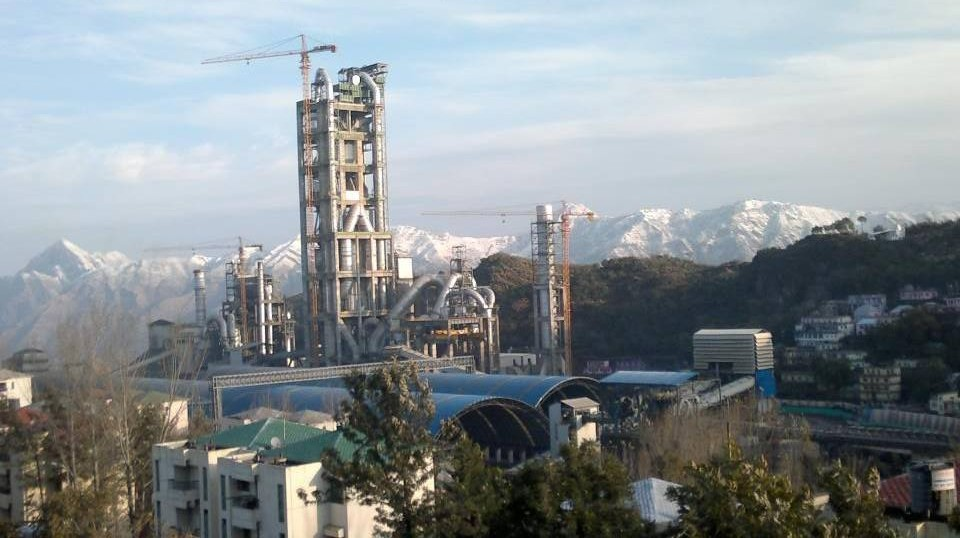
Ambuja cement plant, Darlaghat.

- Ambuja Cement Company
- ISED Pvt. ITI (NCVT recognised) - Also known as Institute For Skill And Entrepreneurship Development
- Solan District Truck Operators Cooperative Society (Regd. under Indian Co-operative societies Act)
- Dev Shri BaduBada Dev Mandir (Dedicated to Lord Sahdev)
- Dev Shiv Gan Devta Mandir Kotla pujaria
- Baadi Dhar, Kangri Dhar, Harsang Dhar, Ghngagughat (All approx. within 20 to 30 kms range)
- Baba ganga giri dhunni at village Aslu around 1000 years old situated at a distance of 15 km from Darlaghat
- DAV Ambuja Vidya Niketan School, Darlaghat
- Waterfall
- S.V.M Syar, Darlaghat
- Government Degree College, Darlaghat

=== Darlaghat Wildlife Sanctuary ===
Darlaghat Wildlife Sanctuary was set up in 1974 in Solan Distinct. It covers an area of about 6 km^{2}. Subtropical and temperate forest are found in this tract in which many species of birds and animal live such as Kaleej and Chukor. Visitors can see black bears, sambar deer, wild boars, red jungle fowls, barking deer and various migratory birds here. Himachal Pradesh Tourism Development Corporation organises various eco-treks here.

=== ISED Pvt. ITI ===
This institute is promoted jointly by Ambuja Cement Foundation and Punjab National Bank. ISED was founded in 2006 and serves community by training youth and homemakers of nearby area in skill development. The institute charges nominal fees for professionally taught courses. New batches for skill training start every year in month of April and October. Government of India approved ITI course in MMV and Electrician trades start every year in August.

=== Dev Shri Shiv Gan Devta And Dev shiri BaduBada Mandir ===
The temple of Dev (God) Shri Shiv Gan Devta and Dev Shiri Badubada has its own religious values to the people of Darlaghat. Normally most of the locals visit this temple once in a month on Sakranti. As a part of their tradition for a set time of period they (locals of Darlaghat) organize Rath Yatra of Dev shri Shiv Gan Devta Dev Shiri BaduBada, at this time Dev Shri Shiv Gan Devta and Dev Shiri BaduBada visit houses of people who call him to their places and this event is named as Jatra.

== Nearby places ==
- Harsing dhar
- Badi ki dhar (22 km): known for annual fair called "Bari Jatra" celebrated on 14 June every year.
- Arki: Earlier known as the "Bhagal" when it was ruled by kings before Independence Of India.
- Kunihar
- Dhami
- Tatapani
- Aslu
