= Chakki Mod =

- Village
- Location in Himachal Pradesh, India Chakki Mod (India)
- Coordinates: 30.8533974°N 77.0033143°E
- Country: India
- State: Himachal Pradesh
- District: Solan

Languages
  - Official: Hindi
  - Regional: Mahasui (Baghati)
- Time zone: UTC+5:30 (IST)
- PIN: 173230
- Telephone code: 01792
- Vehicle registration: HP-14
- Nearest city: Solan
- Lok Sabha constituency: Shimla
- Vidhan Sabha constituency: Solan

Chakki Mod (also called Chakki Morh or Chakki Mor or Chakki Modh) is an area near the village of Bhoj Nagar, in Solan District, Himachal Pradesh. It is 30 km from Chandigarh on Chandigarh-Shimla highway. It is tourist location among youngsters for hangout in natural landscapes and river bed. It is known as a birding hotspot.

== See also ==
- Kasauli
- Dagshai
- Barog
