= Baghliani dialect =

Dialect of Lower Mahasu Pahari, India

Baghliani
- बघल्याणी
- 𑚊𑚂𑚍𑚥𑚣𑚞𑚦
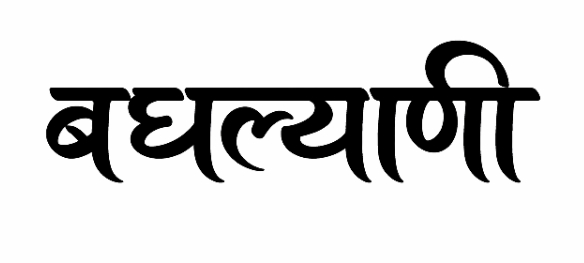
- Baghliani written in Devanagari script
- Pronunciation: [bə.ɡəl.jaː.ɳiː]
- Native to: Himachal Pradesh
- Region: Mahasu
- Language family: Indo-European: Indo-Iranian; Indo-Aryan; North-Western or Northern; Western Pahari; Mahasu Pahari; Baghliani
- Writing system: Takri

Language codes
- ISO 639-3: –
- Glottolog: maha1287
- Approximate location of Baghliani speaking area
- Coordinates: 31.144155°N 76.904916°E

Baghliani (Takri:𑚊𑚂𑚍𑚥𑚣𑚞𑚦) is a dialect of Lower Mahasu Pahari belonging to the Western Pahari group of languages. It is spoken in the western Solan district of Himachal Pradesh. The dialect derives its name from the former princely state of Baghal.

== Extent ==
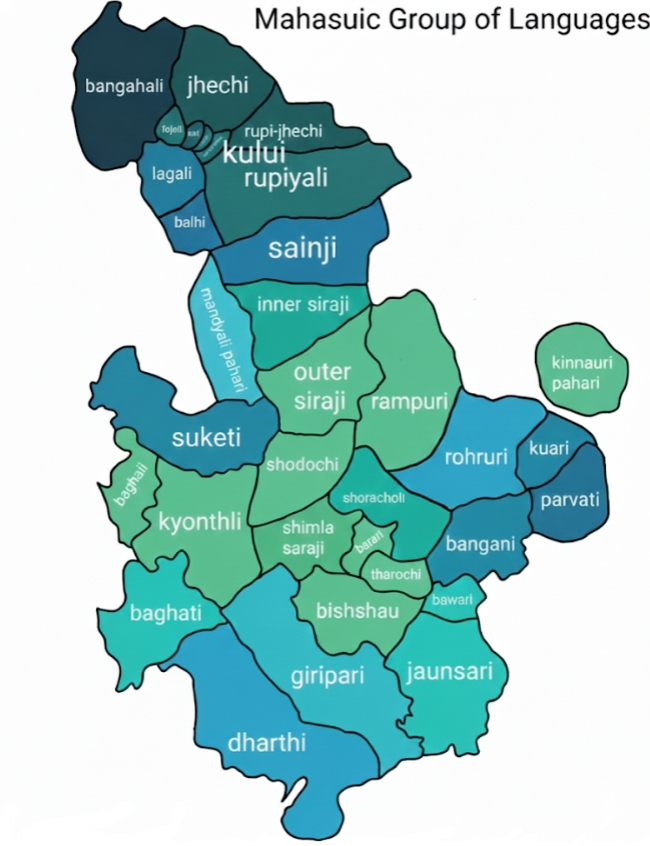
Map of Mahasuic group of languages, as Baghliani dialect is part of it

Baghliani dialect is spoken in western Solan district, the area which was part of the former princely state of Baghal. It is also spoken in bordering villages of Bilaspur district which gradually transits in mixed of Baghliani and Bilaspuri, after which core Bilaspuri is spoken. The notable areas in which it is spoken are Arki Tehsil (capital of former princely state of Baghal), Darlaghat, Ramshehar, Badi Dhar, western parts of Kunihar and northern parts of Nalagarh in which it makes gradual transiton with Hinduri, in proper Nalagarh, Hinduri replaces Baghliani.

== Script and specimen ==
Devanagari (Baghliani):

“हिमाचलो रे अर्की-दारलाघाट तहसीलो दे बाघली-बघल्याणी ग्लाओएं। ऐ बुइली महासुई दे पड़ोइं होर बघाटी होर हिंदूरी साथी मिलोइं।”

Transliteration:

Himācalō ré Arkī-Dārlāghāṭ tehsilō dé Bāghlī-Baghlyāṇī glāoēṅ. É buili Māhāsui dé paṛoīṅ hor Baghāṭī hor Hindurī sāthī miloīṅ.

Meaning (English):

“Baghli–Baghliani is spoken in the Arki and Darlaghat tehsils of Himachal. It belongs to the Mahasui group and is similar to Baghati and Hinduri.”

== Grammar ==
Features	Devanagari	IPA	Translation (English)
Dative case	खे	Khé	to
Inessive case	दे-दा, रे-रा, मा खे	Dé-Dā, Ré-Rā, Bicé, Ma khe (sentence-dependent)	of, in, to me
Possessive affix	गे	Gé	to them
Comitative case	साथे, सौगी	Sāthé(/i) and Sāôgī	with, partner
Genetive case	रा, रे, री	Rā, Ri, Ré	his, their, her
Intorregative words	के, केबे, कऊँ, केईं-केती, कियां, कौ	Ké, Kébbé, Kàuṅ, Kīyāṅ, Kéiṅ-Kétī, Kīyāṅ, Kaô/ Kô	what, when, why, where, how, how many

Sentences in Baghliani with translation:-
Baghliani	Sé kyā/ ké kamāoāṅ
Devanagari	से क्या/ के कमाओआं
English	What does he do?

Baghliani	Kébbé āôṅā tussé āsā ré
Devanagari	केब्बे आऔणा तुस्से आसा रे
English	When will you come visit us?

Baghliani	Kàuṅ bāhi tæṅ tés khé
Devanagari	कऊँ बाही तैं तेस खे
English	Why did you hit him?

Baghliani	Kéiṅ cālīré bhyāgō ré tussé
Devanagari	केईं चालीरे भ्यागो रे तुस्से
English	Where are you off too early in the morning?

Baghliani	Kiyāṅ kôé ubhé tusé étré cchōṛé
Devanagari	कियां कौए उभे तुसे एत्रे छोड़े
English	How did you climb up so quickly?

Baghliani	Kô bhāu hé /munnī hī tés ré
Devanagari	कौ भाऊ हे /मुन्नी ही तेस रे/ री
English	How many sons/ daughters does he have?

Some notable words in Baghliani:-
Baghliani	Devanagari	English
Māṭhā	माठा	Boy
Munnī	मुन्नी	Girl
Bhāu	भाउ	Son
Ḍaīṇī ré	डईणी रे	snake (lit. of the witch)
Karàṛā	कर्ड़ा	Bitter

== See also ==
- Baghal State
- Baghati dialect
- Keonthali dialect
- Hinduri dialect
