= Kunihar =

Town in Himachal Pradesh, India

- Town
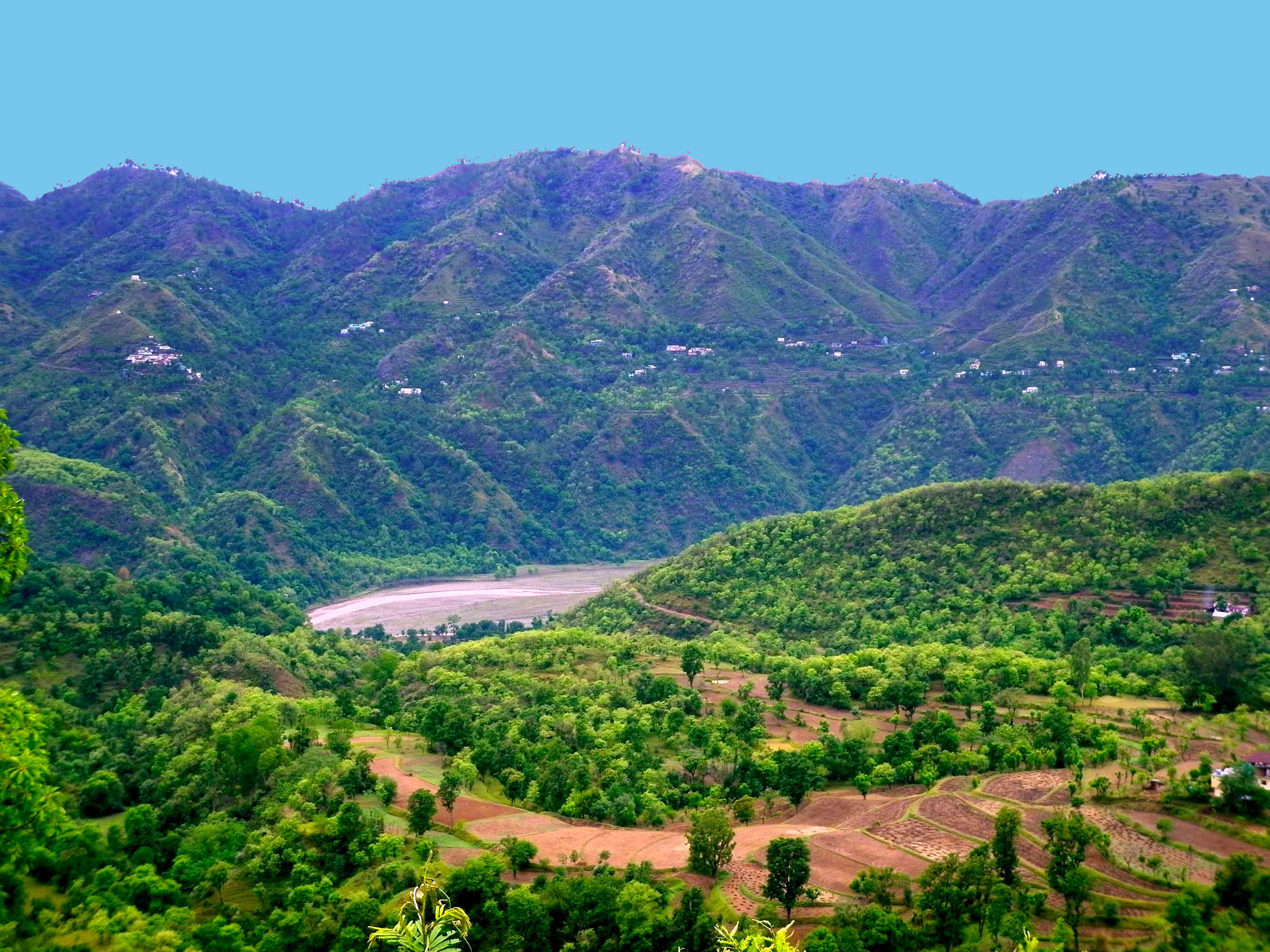
- View of Kunihar valley
- Nickname: Choti Vilayat
- Location within Himachal Pradesh Location within India
- Coordinates: 31°04′44″N 76°57′43″E
- Country: India
- State: Himachal Pradesh
- District: Solan

Languages
  - Official: Hindi
  - Native: Mahasu Pahari (Baghati) (Baghliani)

Kunihar is a valley town in Solan district of the Indian state of Himachal Pradesh. Kunihar is situated alongside Kuni Rivulet, a small river in the shape of garland (har), hence the name.

== Location ==
Kunihar is situated 38 km from Shimla (going on the way to the Jubarhatti Airport) and 39 km from Solan (going via Sabathu).

== History ==
Kunihar was founded in 1154 by Abhoj Dev. . The rulers of the state used the title of 'Thakur'.

=== Rulers ===
The rulers bore the title of Thakur.

- 1815 - 1816 Mungri Das
- 1816 - 1866 Kishen Singh
- 1866 - 1905 Tegh Singh
- 1905 - 15 Aug 1947 Hardev Singh.

== Gallery ==
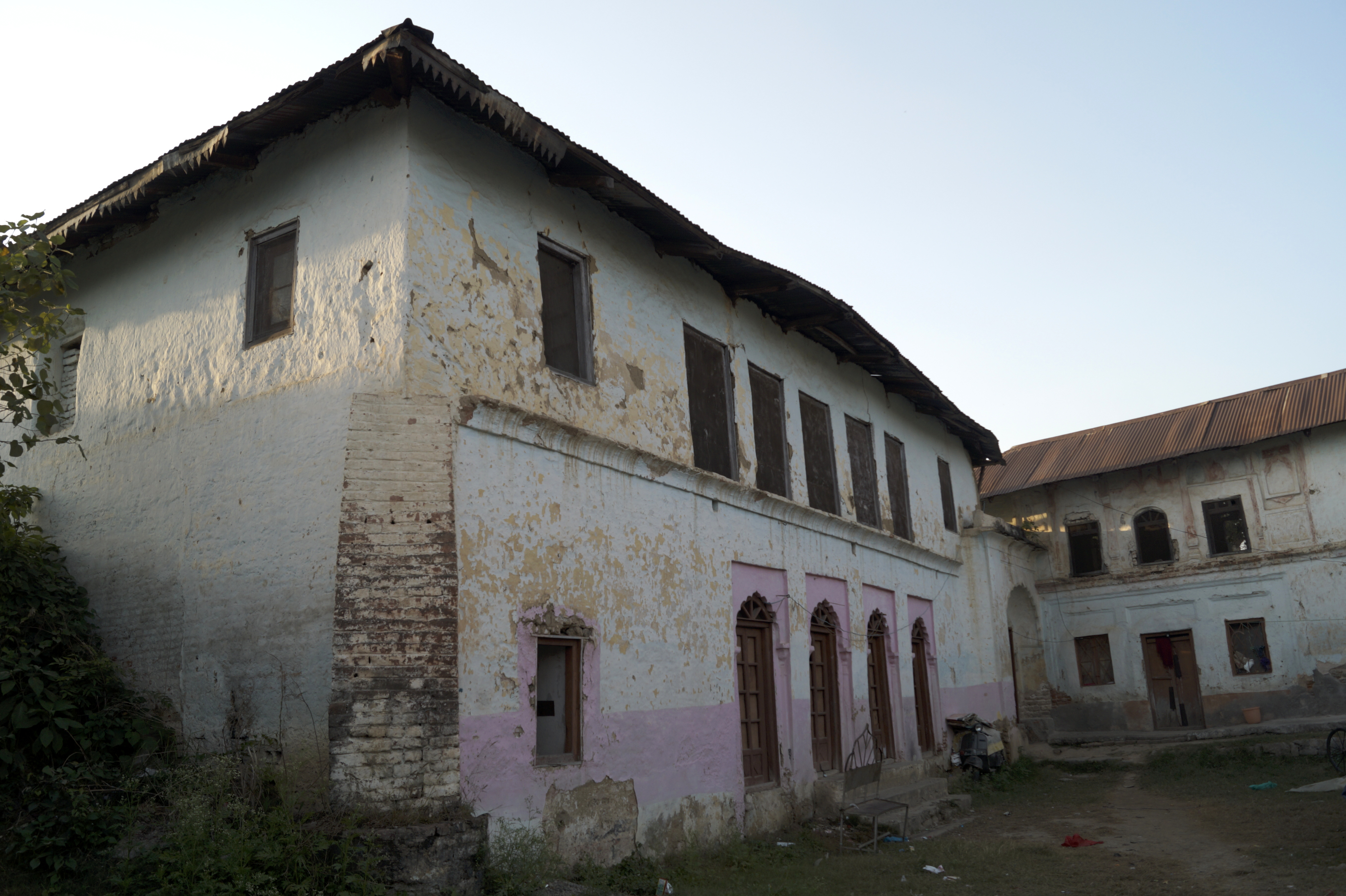
Palace of Kunihar

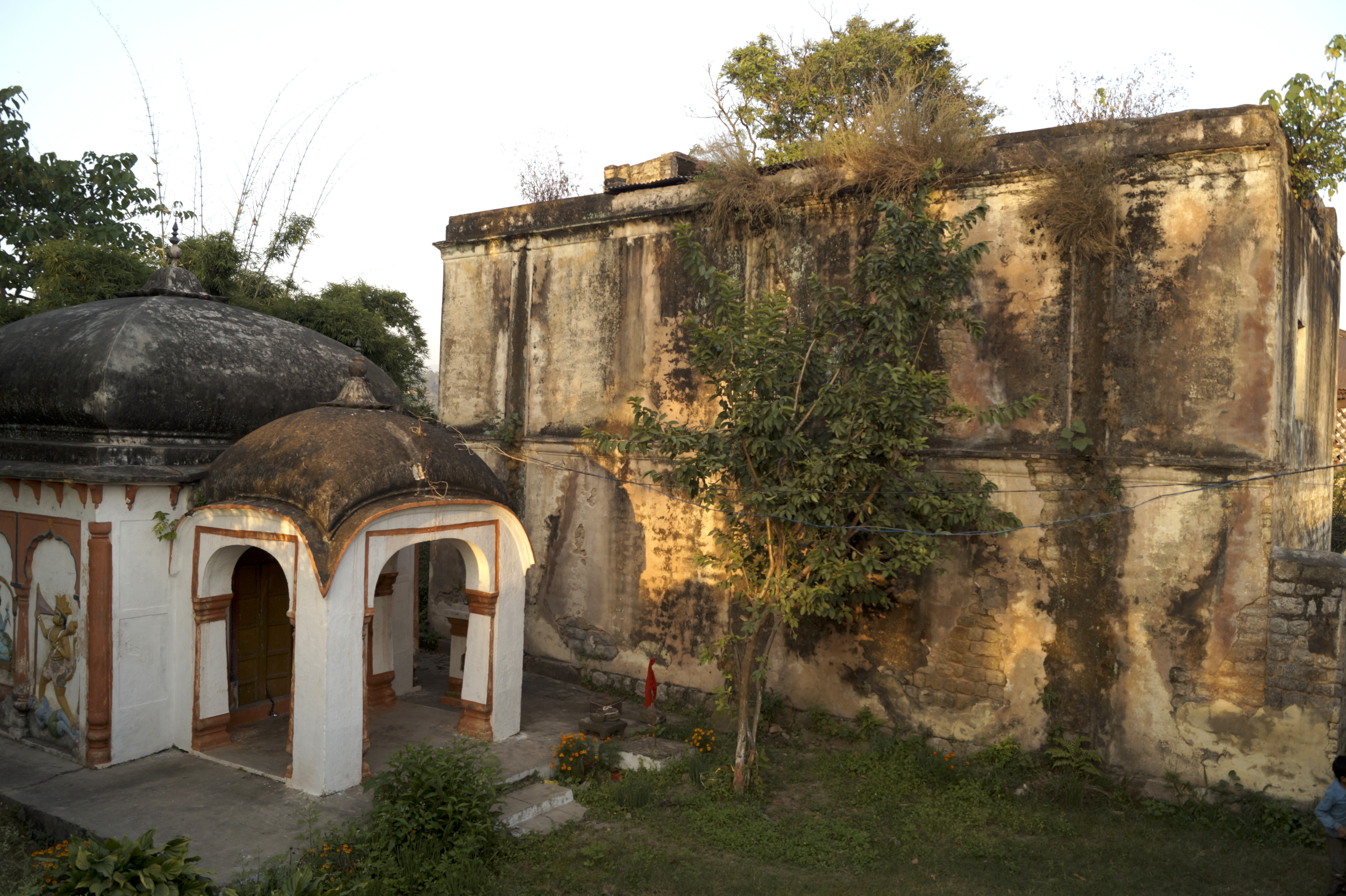
Temple and back side view of palace of Kunihar

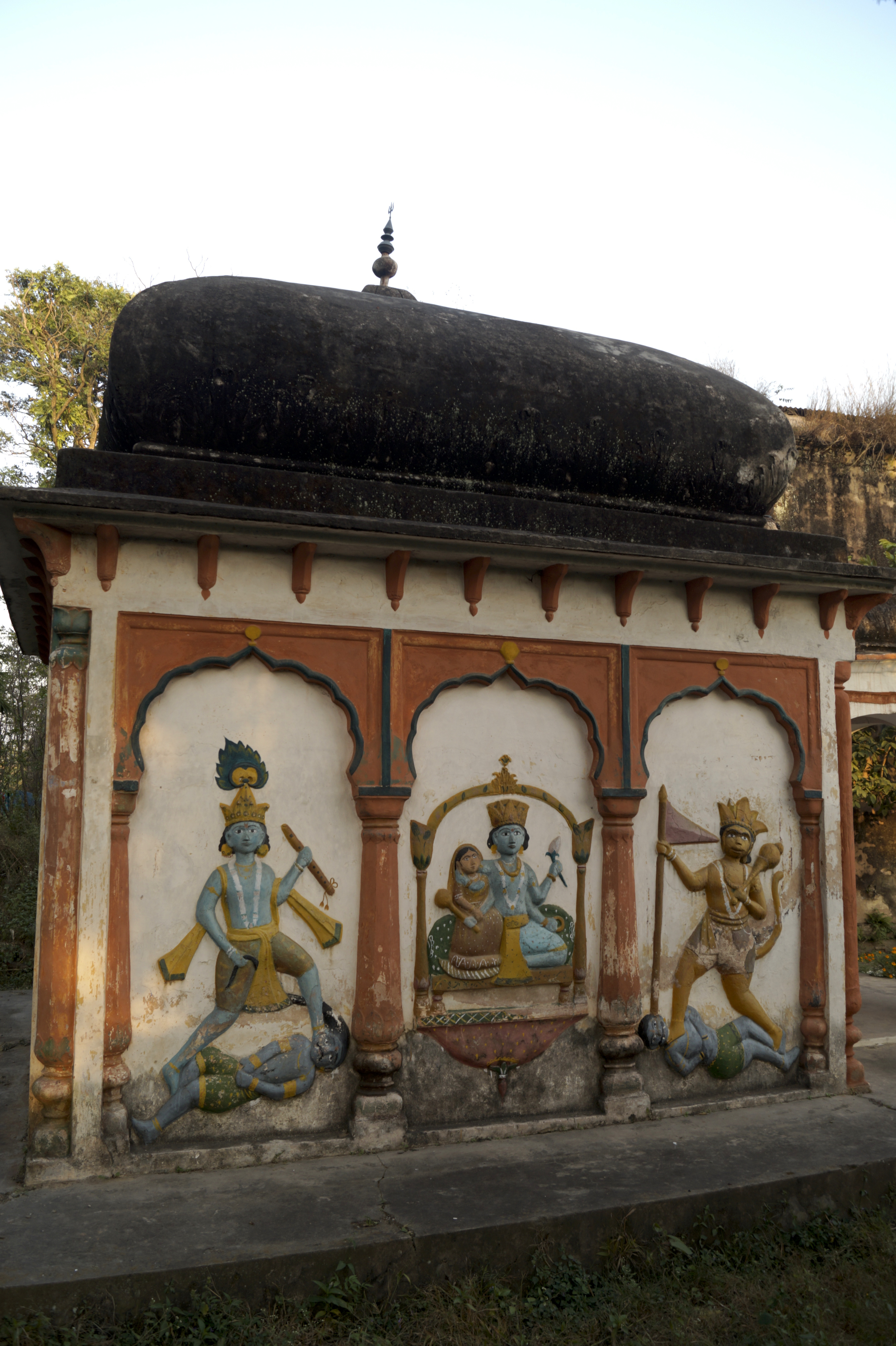
Temple in palace of Kunihar Princely State

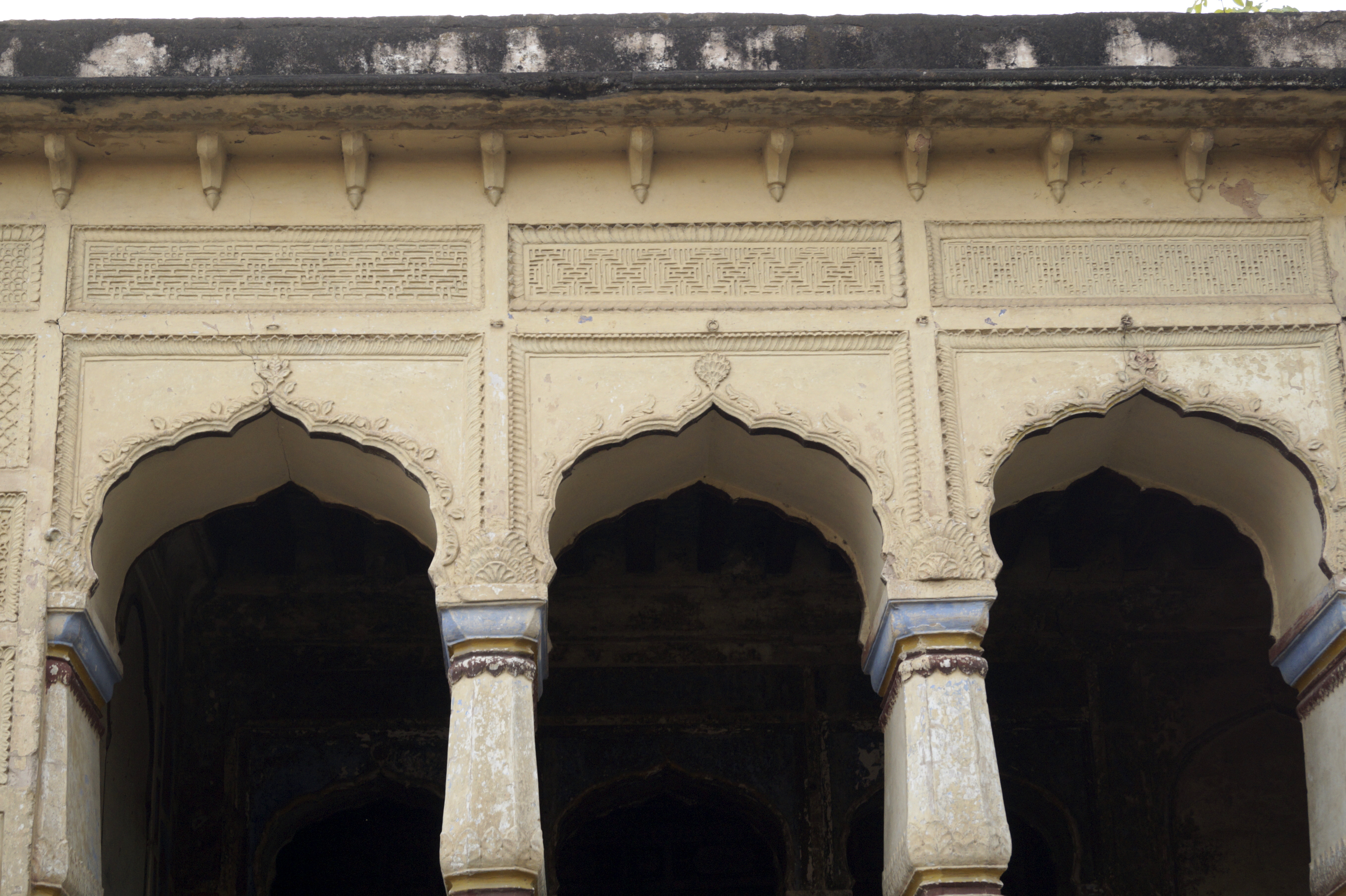
Palace of Kunihar Princely State
