= Sabathu =

Sabathu Subathu
- Cantonment town
- Location in Himachal Pradesh, India Sabathu (India)
- Coordinates: 30.97°N 76.99°E
- Country: India
- State: Himachal Pradesh
- District: Solan
- Elevation: 1,265 m (4,150 ft)

Population (2001)
  - Total: 5,720

Languages
  - Official: Hindi
  - Regional: Mahasui (Baghati)
- Time zone: UTC+5:30 (IST)

Sabathu (also known as Subathu) is a cantonment town in Solan district in the Indian state of Himachal Pradesh. It has a historic association with the Anglo-Nepalese War, and is now the centre of the 1st Gorkha Rifles and the 4th Gorkha Rifles of the Indian Army.

== History ==
During the colonial period, Subathu was a part of British Indian territory, and served as a cantonment in the Simla district, Punjab Province.

The First Gurkha Rifles was raised in Subathu in 1815, from the remnants of the Nepali General Amar Singh Thapa's army after the Anglo-Gorkha wars.

== Geography ==
Sabathu has an average elevation of 1265 metres (4150 feet).

== Demographics ==
As of 2001 India census, Sabathu had a population of 8720. Males constitute 47% of the population and females 53%. Sabathu has an average literacy rate of 86%, higher than the national average of 59.5%: male literacy is 91%, and female literacy is 77%. In Sabathu, 9% of the population is under 6 years of age.

British military expeditions went to greater Sabathu to recuperate. It housed a regional leper colony during the 19th century.
