= Nalagarh =

- Town
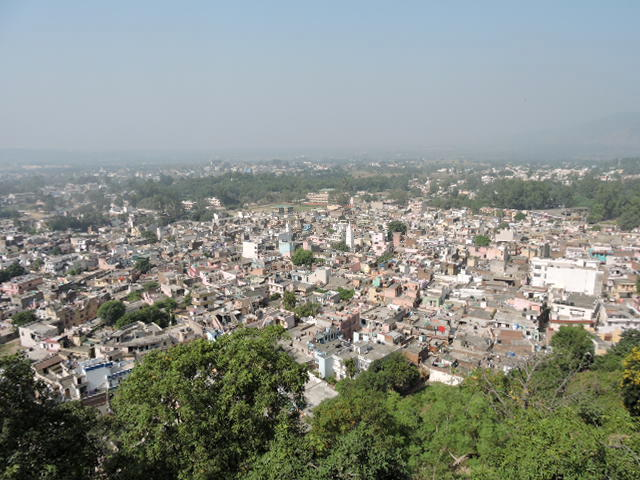
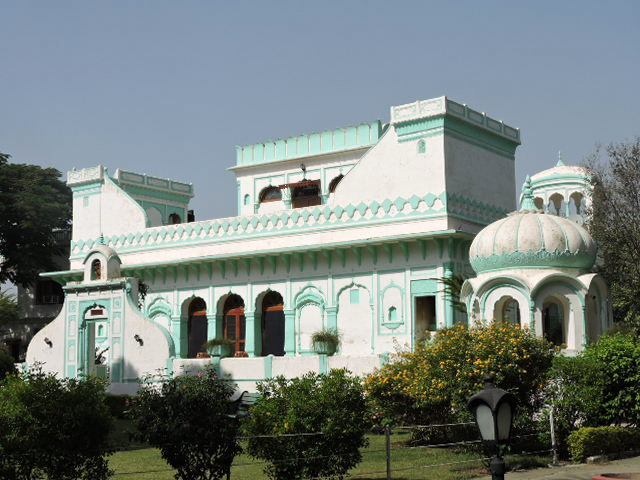
- From top to bottom: View of Nalagarh town from uphill, Nalagarh Fort

- Location in Himachal Pradesh, India Nalagarh (India)
- Coordinates: 31.05°N 76.72°E
- Country: India
- State: Himachal Pradesh
- District: Solan

Population (2011)
  - Total: 10,708
  - Rank: 15 in HP

Languages
  - Official: Hindi
  - Native: Baghliani; Hinduri; Puadhi
- Time zone: UTC+5:30 (IST)
- Vehicle registration: HP HP-12

Nalagarh is a town and a municipal committee, near the city of Solan in Solan district in the Indian state of Himachal Pradesh. It is part of the BBN (Baddi-Barotiwala-Nalagarh) industrial area. Nalagarh is a gateway to Himachal Pradesh in North India, 92 km (57 mi) from Shimla, 81 kilometres (50 mi) from Solan city, 318 km (198 mi) from New Delhi and 49 km (30 mi) from Chandigarh.

== History ==
The Fort of Nalagarh was built in 1421 during the reign of Raja Bikram Chand on a hillock at the foothills of the Himalayas. It affords a panoramic view of the Shivalik hills beyond the Sirsa river and gave its name to the state. Nalagarh enjoyed indirect rule during the British Raj as a non-salute state.

In the early twentieth century, Nalagarh State was one of the Simla hill states, under the government of Punjab. The country was overrun by Gurkhas for some years before 1815, when they were driven out by the British, and the raja was confirmed in possession of the territory. Grain and opium were the main agricultural products.

=== Rulers ===
Details of Rajas.
Period	Raja	Death
1681 - 1701	Dharm Chand	
1701 - 1705	Himmat Chand	
1705 - 1761?	Bhup Singh	
1761? - 1762	Man Chand	(d. c.1762)
1762 - 1788	Gaje Singh	
1788 - 1803	Ram Saran Singh (1st time)	(b. c.1762 - d. 1848)
1803 - 1815	occupied by Nepal	
1815 - 1848	Ram Saran Sungh (2nd time)	(s.a.)
1848 - 1857	Bije Singh	(d. 1857)
1857 - 15 Jan 1860	interregnum	
15 Jan 1860 - Dec 1876	Agar Singh	(b. 1804 - d. 1876)
16 Dec 1876 - 18 Sep 1911	Ishri Singh	(b. 1836 - d. 1911)
18 Sep 1911 - 1946	Jogindra Singh	(b. 1877 - d. 1946)
1946 - 15 August 1947	Surendra Singh (b. 1922 - d. 1971)	

== Ramshehar ==
Maharaja of Parmar Rajputs had established Ramshehar City, and shielded the residents of Ramshehar during 14th century.

Ramshehar was temporarily visited from Chandel Rajputs, during which Chandel Rajputs decided to establish Nalagarh.

== Ramshehar Fort ==
Ramshehar Fort was built by Maharaja of Parmar Rajputs, which was supported by Raja Ram Chand in the 15th century.

Ramshehar Fort Resort is a Heritage property, which is located in Himachal 2.5 km from Ramshehar Bus Stand on Swarghat Road.

== Governance ==
Nalagarh is a municipal council with 9 wards. Nalagarh area touches the areas of Ropar and Anandpur Sahib of Punjab. Nalagarh also lies in Puadh region where 'puadhi' spoke in late time but after partition when Punjab, Himachal or Haryana and Chandigarh state build, Nalagarh and other area of nalagarh comes in Himachal Pradesh. language spoken by the people are Hindi Punjabi Puadhi (due to influence of early Punjabi) and Pahari (people migrate from different area of Himachal to Nalagarh for work).

== Demographics ==
As of 2001 India census, Nalagarh had a population of 9,433. Males constitute 54% of the population and females 46%. Nalagarh has an average literacy rate of 76%, higher than the national average of 59.5%: male literacy is 80%, and female literacy is 72%. 12% of the population is under 6.

In the 1961 Census of India, 78.4% of the Nalagarh tehsil of the then Ambala district registered as Hindi-speaking which is indirecly linked to Mahasui language group of Western Pahari languages as the region's native languages are Baghliani and Hinduri sub-dialects of Keonthali which is a dialect of Mahasui, as Western Pahari languages are usually termed as the dialects of Hindi and Indo-Aryan languages, 14.8% as Puadhi dialect of Punjabi-speakers and 6.4% as other Western Pahari-speaking.

Sr No	Language	1961 census
1	Mahasui (Baghliani), (Hinduri)	78.4%
2	Puadhi	14.8%
3	Pahari unspecified	6.4%
4	Other	0.4%

According to 2011 census, the Nalagarh Municipal Council has population of 10,708 of which 5,739 are males while 4,969 are females. Children age 0-6 number 1296 or 12.10%. The Female Sex Ratio is 866 against state average of 972. The Child Sex Ratio is around 914 compared to Himachal Pradesh state average of 909. Literacy rate is 90.03% higher than state average of 82.80%. Male literacy is around 93.07% while female literacy rate is 86.51%.

Religion profile
Sr No	Religion	Percentage as per 2011 Census
1	Hindu	82.01%
2	Muslim	10.14%
3	Sikh	4.06%
4	Jain	3.36%
5	Christian	0.31%
6	Buddhist	0.02%
7	Others	0.01%
8	Not stated	0.08%

Nalagarh has been ranked 3rd best “National Clean Air City” under (Category 3 population under 3 lakhs cities) in India according to 'Swachh Vayu Survekshan 2024 Results'

== Economy ==
4,291 residents were engaged in work or business activity. Of this 3,309 were males while 982 were females. 93.08% were engaged in Main Work while 6.92% were engaged in Marginal Work.
