= Hinduri dialect =

Dialect of Keonthali sub-group of Lower Mahasu Pahari, India

Hinduri
- Handuri
- हिंडूरी, hiṁḍūrī हंडूरी, haṁḍūrī
- The word "Hinduri" written in Devanagari script
- Native to: Himachal Pradesh
- Region: Mahasu
- Native speakers: (47,800 cited 2001 census); Census results conflate some speakers with Hindi.
- Language family: Indo-European: Indo-Iranian; Indo-Aryan; Northern; Western Pahari; Hinduri
- Writing system: Takri, Devanagari

Language codes
- ISO 639-3: hii
- Glottolog: hind1267
- ELP: Hinduri

Hinduri (or Handuri) is a Western Pahari language of northern India. It is spoken in southern Solan district in southern parts of Ramshehar Tehsil and in eastern Nalagarh. It was classified as a dialect under the Mahasui Keonthali Group (as per Grierson).

== Phonology ==
=== Consonants ===
		Labial	Dental/ Alveolar	Retroflex	Post-alv./ Palatal	Velar	Glottal
Nasal	voiced	m	n	ɳ		ŋ	
Nasal	breathy	mʱ	nʱ				
Stop/ Affricate	voiceless	p	t	ʈ	tɕ	k	
Stop/ Affricate	aspirated	pʰ	tʰ	ʈʰ	tɕʰ	kʰ	
Stop/ Affricate	voiced	b	d	ɖ	dʑ	ɡ	
Stop/ Affricate	breathy	bʱ	dʱ	ɖʱ	dʑʱ	ɡʱ	
Fricative			s		ɕ		h
Rhotic	voiced		r	ɽ			
Rhotic	breathy			ɽʱ			
Lateral	voiced		l	ɭ			
Lateral	breathy		lʱ				
Approximant		w			j		

=== Vowels ===
	Front	Central	Back
High	iː		uː
High	ɪ		ʊ
Mid	eː	ə	oː
Mid	ɛ	ə	ɔ
Low	(æ)	ɑ ɑː	

== Script ==
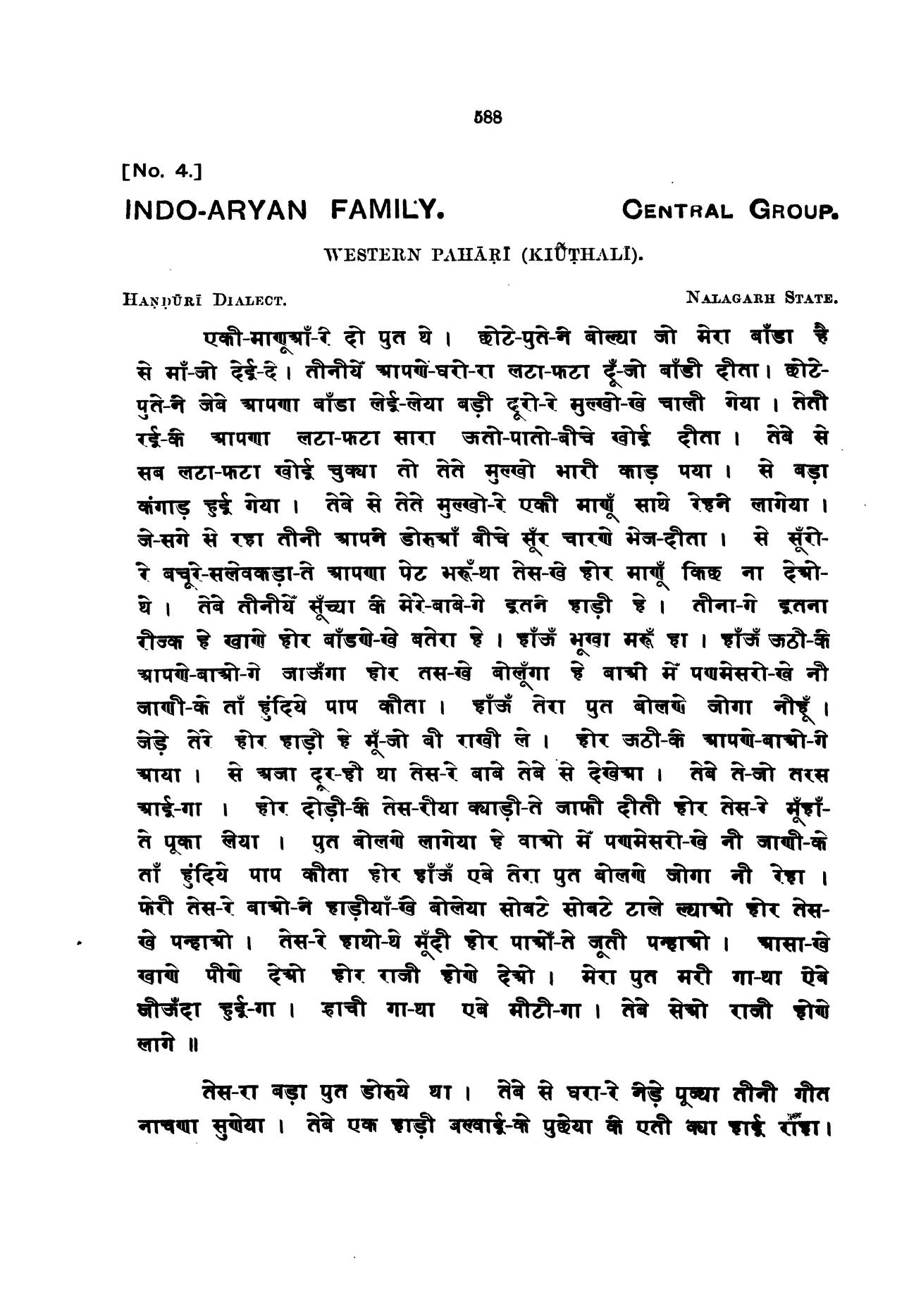
Sample text in Handuri From Grierson's book (1916)

== Status ==
The language is commonly called Pahari or Himachali. The language has no official status. According to the United Nations Education, Scientific and Cultural Organisation (UNESCO), the language is of critically endangered category, i.e. the youngest speakers of Handuri are generally grandparents or older and they too speak it infrequently or partially.

The demand for the inclusion of 'Pahari (Himachali)' under the Eight Schedule of the Constitution, which is supposed to represent multiple Pahari languages of Himachal Pradesh, had been made in the year 2010 by the state's Vidhan Sabha. There has been no positive progress on this matter since then even when small organisations are striving to save the language. The language is currently recorded as a dialect of Hindi, even when having a poor mutual intelligibility with it.

== See also ==
- Mahasu Pahari
- Keonthali dialect
- Baghati dialect
- Baghliani dialect
