= Kandaghat =

- Town
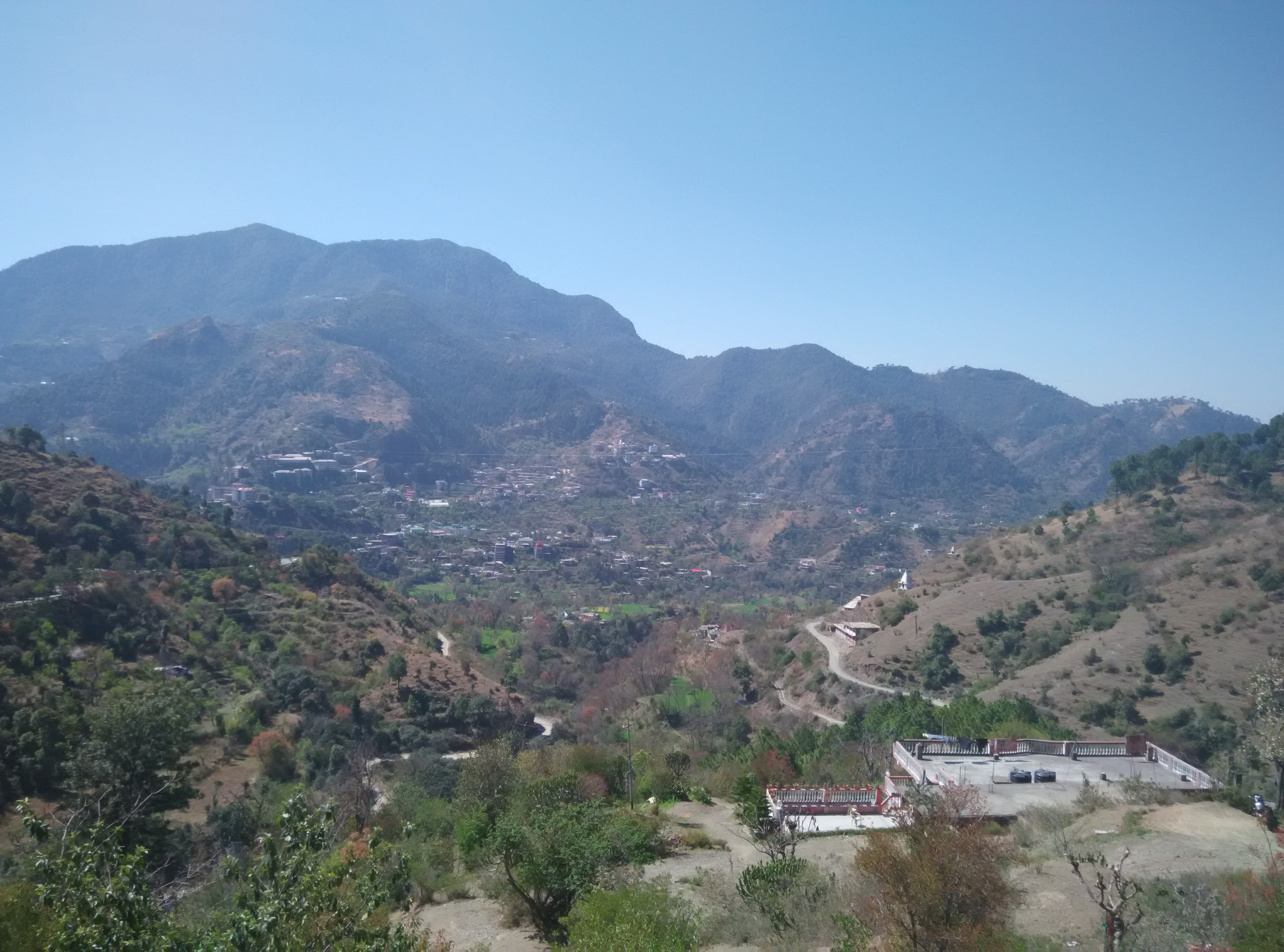
- Bird's View of Kandaghat, Himachal Pradesh

- Location in Himachal Pradesh, India Kandaghat (India)
- Coordinates: 30.983°N 77.117°E
- Country: India
- State: Himachal Pradesh
- District: Solan
- Elevation: 1,425 m (4,675 ft)

Languages
  - Official: Hindi
  - Regional: Mahasu Pahari (Baghati)
- Time zone: UTC+5:30 (IST)
- PIN: 173215
- Website: http://hpsolan.nic.in Official Website of Solan District

Kandaghat is a small town and tehsil (sub-district), near Solan city in the Solan district of Himachal Pradesh, India. It is on the Kalka-Shimla National Highway No. 5. The road to the famous tourist destination of Chail turns from Kandaghat which is at a distance of 29 km. The capital of Himachal Pradesh, Shimla (earlier called Simla) is at a distance of 30 km.

== Places of interest ==
- Sadhupul: a small village in Himachal Pradesh between Solan and Chail, located at the site of a small bridge constructed over the hill river "Ashwini". A water park was inaugurated on 30 June 2017 by CM.
- Chail: located is 25 km from Kandaghat. The Chail Palace, well-known for its architecture, was built as summer retreat by the Maharaja of Patiala during the British Raj, on the land allotted to him by the British for former's assistance in the Anglo-Nepalese War. Maharaja Patiala palace which was built in 18th century, now houses Polytechnic College for women run by the government of Himachal Pradesh.
- Sirinagar: a small village about 1 km from market. An ancient Shiva temple, to which many devotees come to pay their obeisance every year, is situated here.
- Karol temple: an ancient temple is located approximately 4 km foot height from Kandaghat. It is believed to have been built by the Pandavas during their exile (banvas). The full view of Solan can be seen from here.
- Raj Rajeshwari Mata Temple: This temple is dedicated to Raj Rajeshwari Mata, constructed in the year 2004 at a distance of 1 km from the main bazaar.
