= Barotiwala =

- Industrial Town
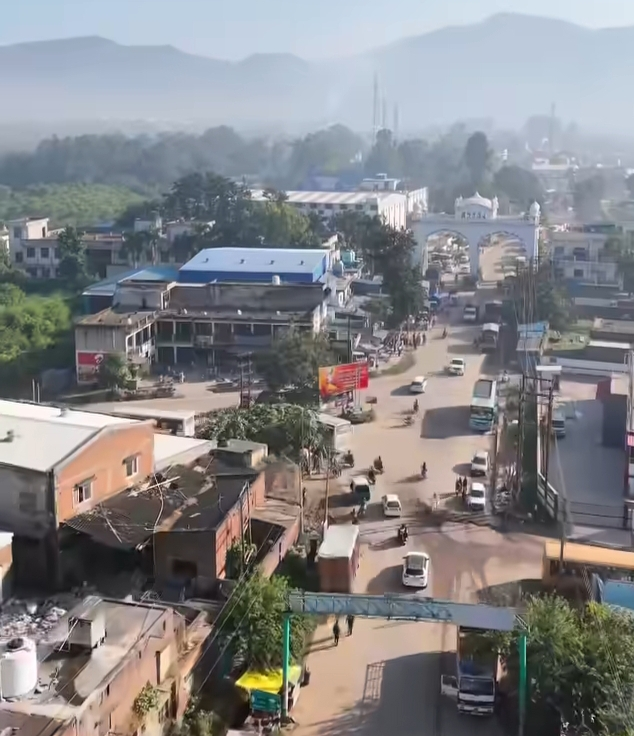
- Skyline of Barotiwala

- Location of Barotiwala in Himachal Pradesh Barotiwala (India)
- Coordinates: 30°54′44″N 76°49′57″E
- Country: India
- State: Himachal Pradesh
- District: Solan

Languages
  - Official: Hindi
  - Regional: Puadhi
- PIN: 174103
- Vehicle registration: HP 93; HP 12

Barotiwala is an industrial town which is a part of larger industrial circuit of BBN (Baddi-Barotiwala-Nalagarh) in Solan district of North Indian state of Himachal Pradesh.

== Geography ==
Barotiwala is located in Dun (valley) at the foothills of Shivaliks, at the border of Himachal Pradesh and Haryana. It is part of the greater industrial circuit of Himachal Pradesh which is known as BBN, abbreviated from Baddi-Barotiwala-Nalagarh, these three towns comprises one of the major industrial hubs of India. It is 58 kilometres (36 mi) from district headquarters Solan, 78 kilometres (48 mi) from state capital Shimla and 34 kilometres (21 mi) from Chandigarh.

Nearby major towns and villages are Mandhala, Thana, Manpura, Kasauli, Garkhal, Sanawar, Taksal, Anji Matla, Badian, Banasar, Bhaguri, Bughar Kanaitan, Chamian, Chamon, Ganol, Gharsi, etc.

There is a university situated in Barotiwala named Chitkara University, Himachal Pradesh.
