= Baghati dialect =

Dialect of Lower Mahasu Pahari, India

Baghati
- बघाटी
- 𑚊𑚂𑚍𑚝𑚦
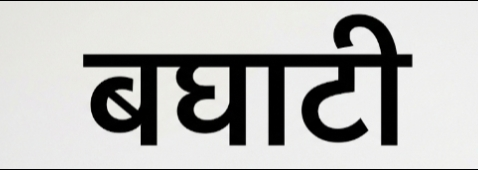
- Baghati written in Devanagari script
- Pronunciation: /bə.ɡʱaː.ʈiː/
- Native to: Himachal Pradesh; Haryana
- Region: Mahasu
- Language family: Indo-European: Indo-Iranian; Indo-Aryan; Northern; Western Pahari; Mahasu Pahari; Baghati
- Writing system: Takri

Language codes
- ISO 639-3: –
- Glottolog: bagh1249
- ELP: Baghati
- Approximate location of the Baghati speaking area in India
- Coordinates: 30.911941°N 77.102886°E

Baghati (Takri:𑚊𑚂𑚍𑚝𑚦) is a dialect of Lower Mahasu Pahari belonging to the Western Pahari group of languages (as per Grierson). It is spoken in the eastern Solan district of Himachal Pradesh as well as in Kalka and Pinjore in Panchkula district of Haryana.

== Extent ==
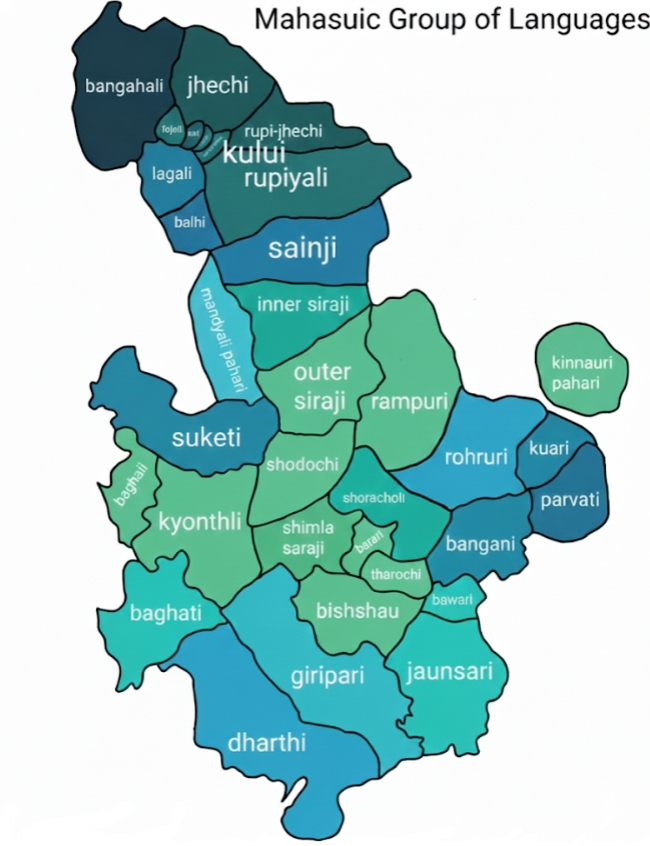
Map of Mahasuic group of languages, as Baghati dialect is part of it

Baghati dialect got its name from former princely Baghat State. This dialect of Mahasu Pahari is spoken mainly in eastern Solan district which include notable areas of district headquarters Solan, Kandaghat, Waknaghat, eastern parts of Kunihar, Chail, Dharampur, Kuthar, Subathu, Kasauli, Parwanoo, etc and parts of Panchkula district which includes Kalka, Pinjore, etc. In Kalka, eastern Baddi, Barotiwala and Pinjore its sub-dialect Pinjore Baghati also known as Patiala Baghati (got its name from hilly parts of former princely Patiala State) is spoken.

== Script and specimen ==
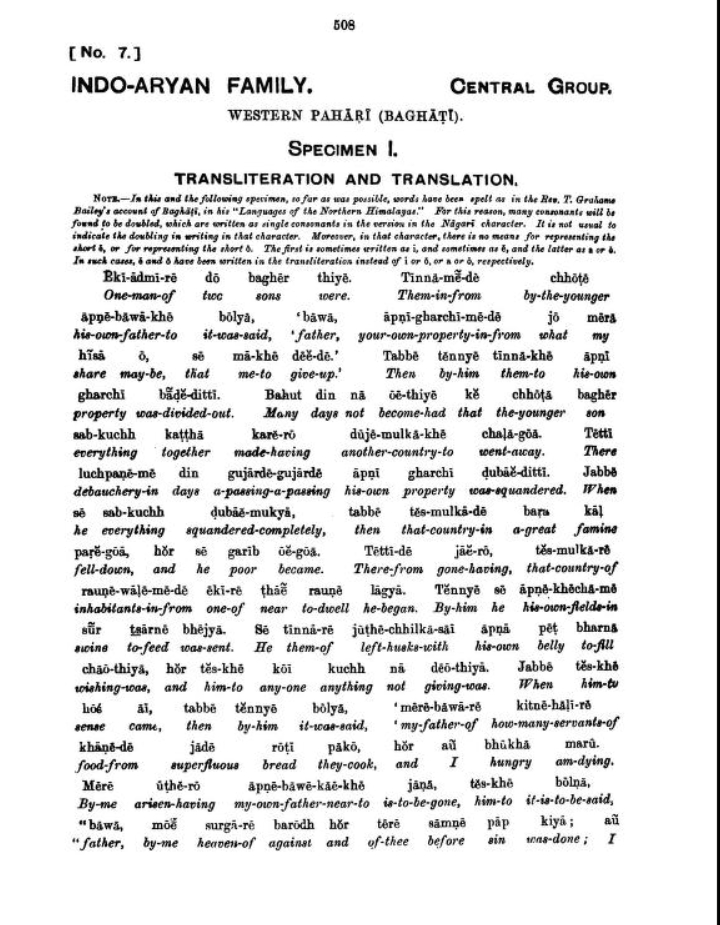
Specimen of Baghati dialect of Mahasu Pahari

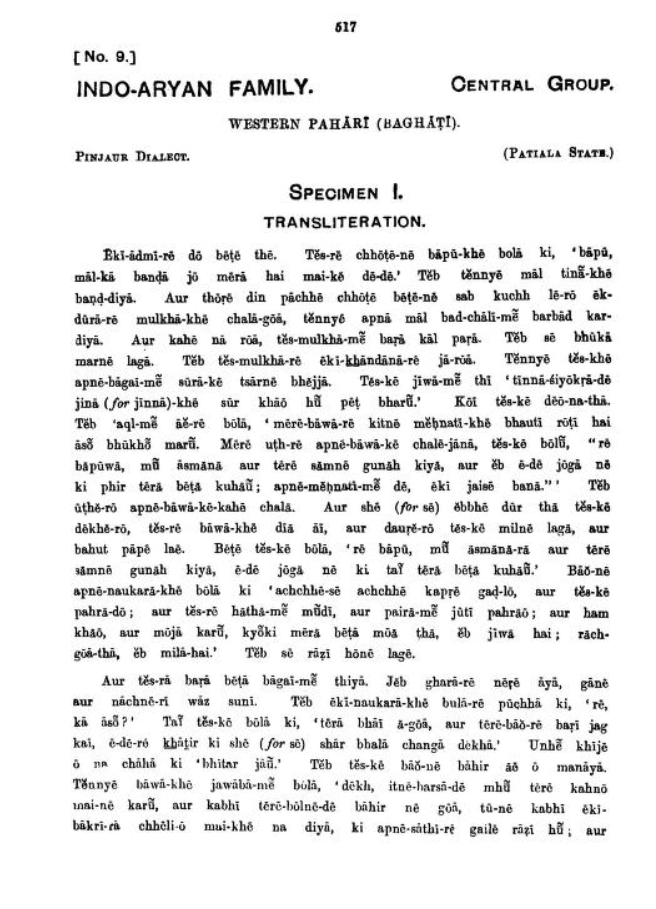
Specimen of Pinjore Baghati, the sub-dialect of the Baghati dialect of Mahasu Pahari

== Similarity with Haryanvi ==
According to the Journal of Language Survey Reports in March 2024, Baghati dialect of Mahasu Pahari is one of the closest dialects which related to Haryanvi.

Lexical similarity percentages :-

HRT - Rohtak

95 HJN - Jind

95 93 HNG - Naraingarh

95 92 92 HLH - Loharu

93 91 90 92 HTR - Taoru

91 90 91 89 89 HFT - Fatehabad

88 87 88 90 90 82 BPL - Braj Bhasha, Palwal

78 79 85 83 83 82 83 HIN - Hindi

74 75 80 74 74 77 70 70 PUN - Punjabi

66 67 72 66 69 69 64 67 65 PBG - Baghati

== See also ==
- Baghat State
- Baghliani dialect
- Keonthali dialect
- Hinduri dialect
