= Badi ki dhar =

Religious site in India

Badi Ki Dhar also known as Badi Dhar is a religious site near Solan city in Solan district, around 56 kilometres (35 mi) from Shimla in the Indian state of Himachal Pradesh. It is about 10 kilometres (6.2 mi) from Piplughat Badi Dhar is 6781 feet above sea level.

== Geography ==
Peak is highest in District Solan. The place is surrounded by dense forest for 6-8 kilometres in all directions that hosts many birds and animals, such as Monal, leopard, barking deer, Tiger, and vulnerable Himalayan goral are found. Weather remains pleasant in Summer temperature ranging from 20 to 25 °C (68 to 77 °F) at noon to 10 to 12 °C (50 to 54 °F) at night. Winters are pretty cool and temperature ranging from 4 to 8 °C (39 to 46 °F) at noon to −2 to −6 °C (28 to 21 °F) at night. Being at 6,781 feet (2,067 m) Badi Dhar enjoys five to seven snowfalls with more than a foot of snow every year and heavy rains in monsoon. Snowcapped mountains(higher ranges above 14,000 feet [4,300 m]) can be seen from the top including i.e. Dhauladhar range, middle himalayan ranges i.e. Shikari devi hills (Dist. Mandi 10,900 feet [3,300 m]), Kamrunag hill (District. Mandi 10,570 feet [3,220 m])), Shali ka tibba (District. Shimla 9,450 feet [2,880 m])) and southern himachal's highest sacred peak Churdhar (District. Shimla/solan/sirmour 11,965 feet [3,647 m])).
