= Solan district =

District of Himachal Pradesh in India

- District of Himachal Pradesh
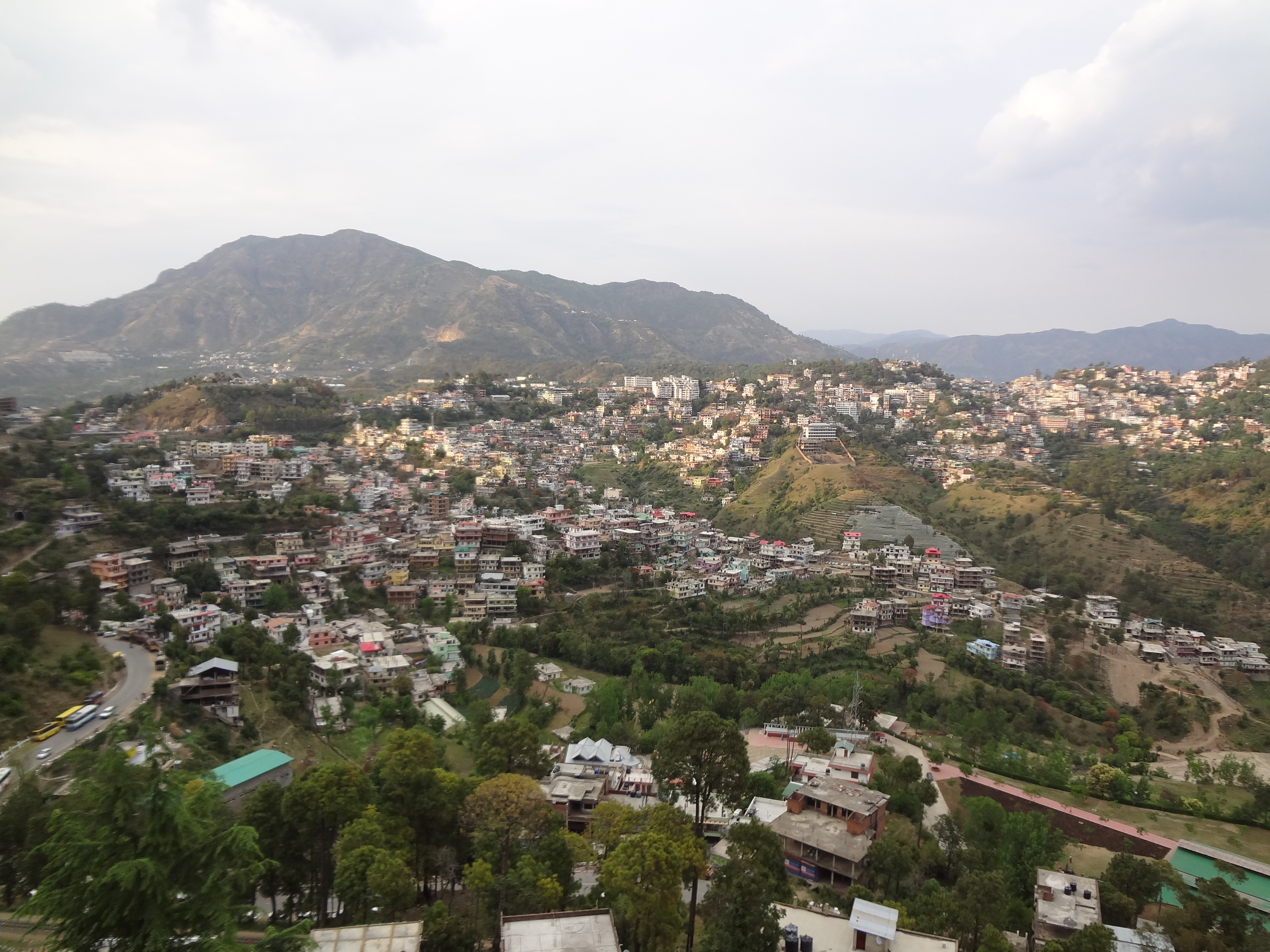
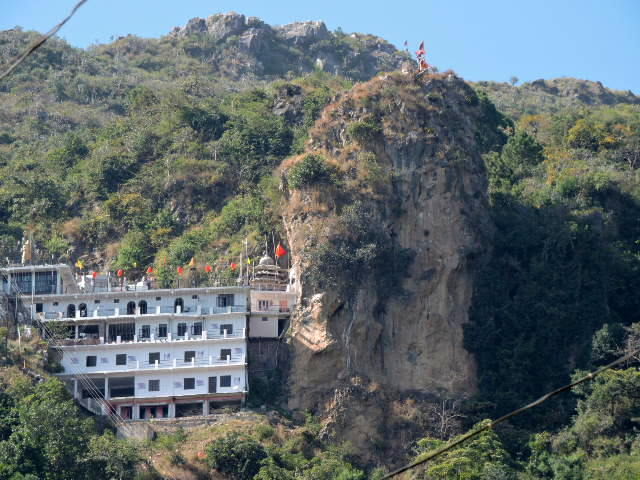
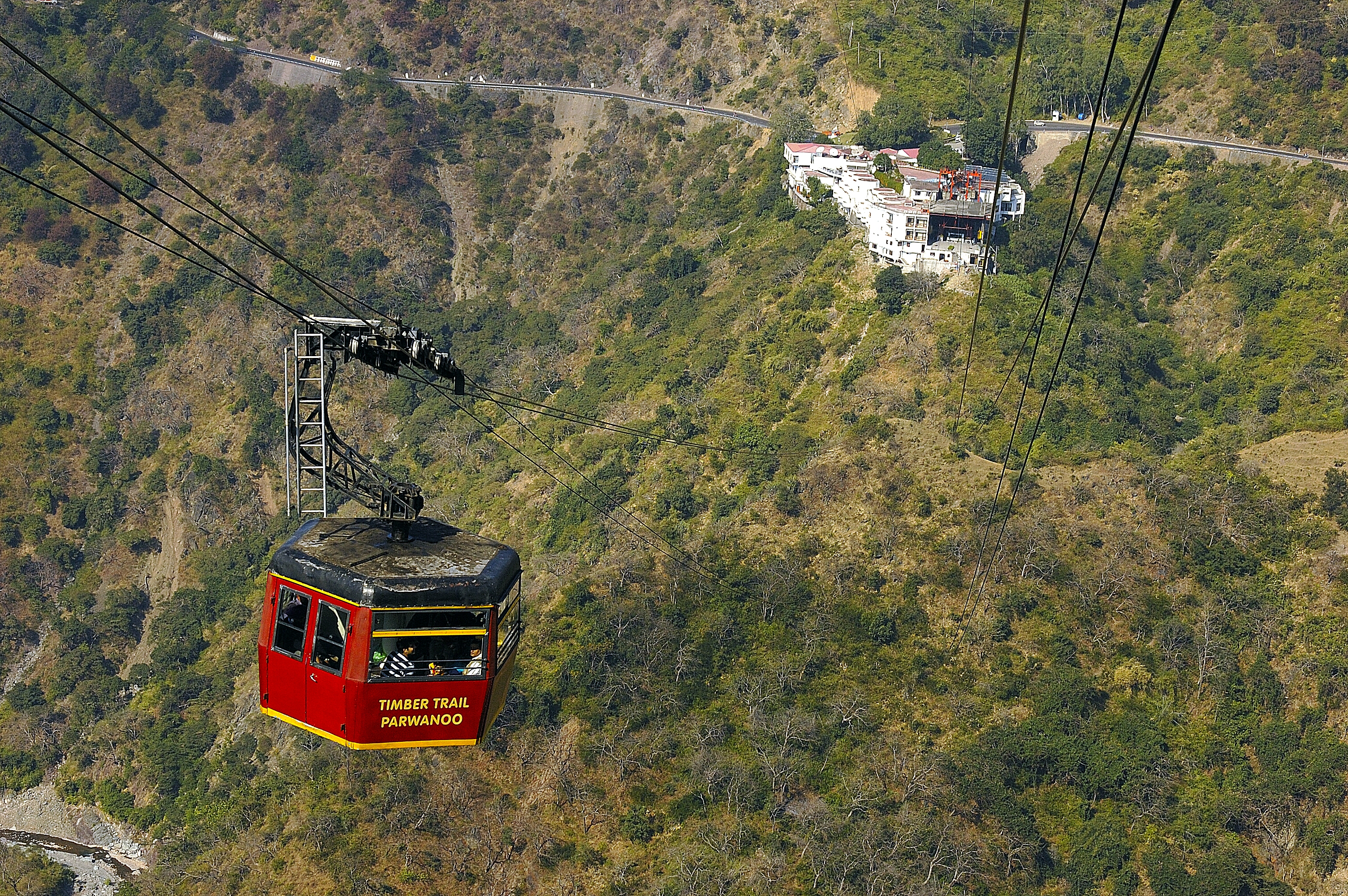
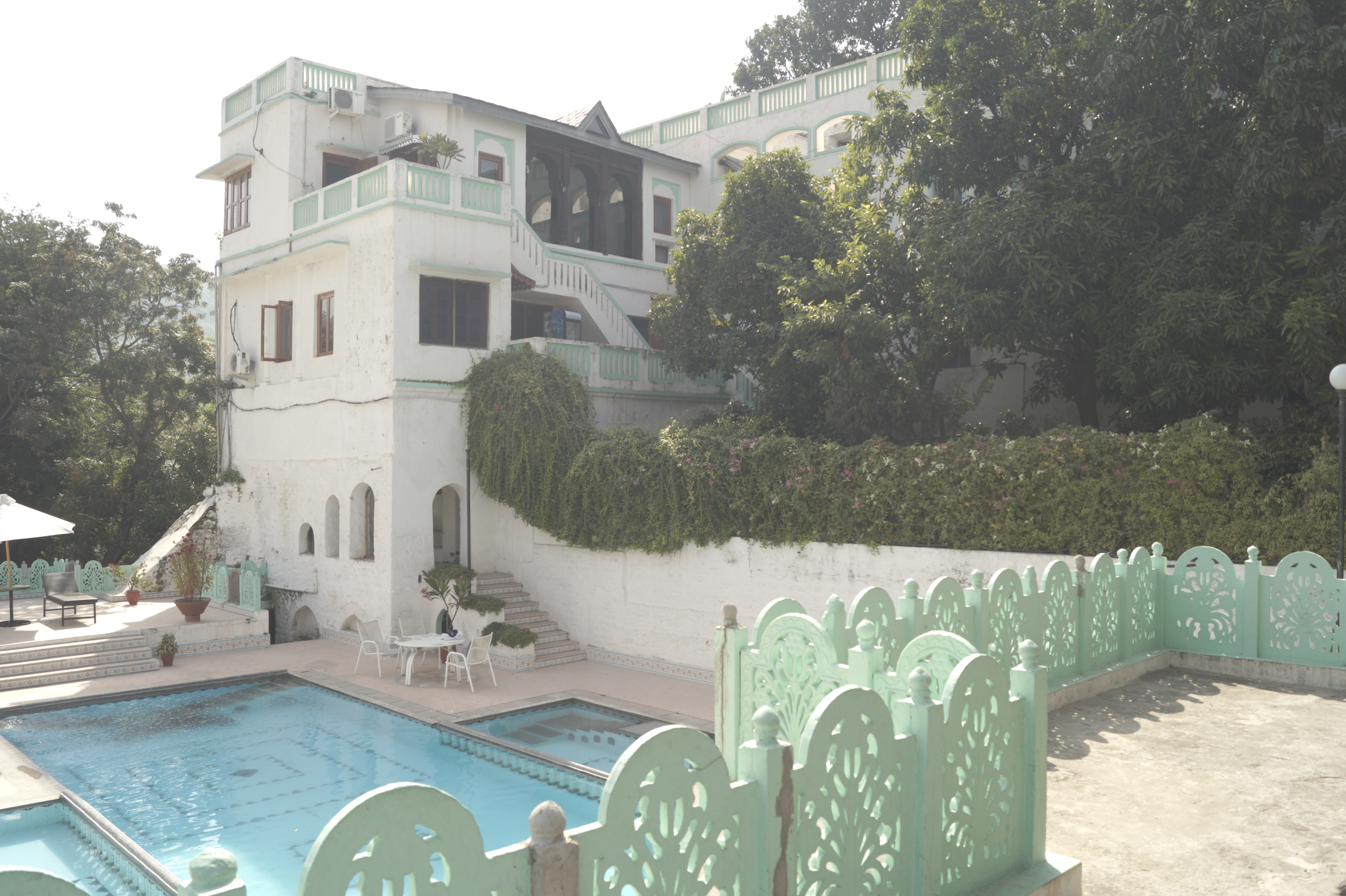
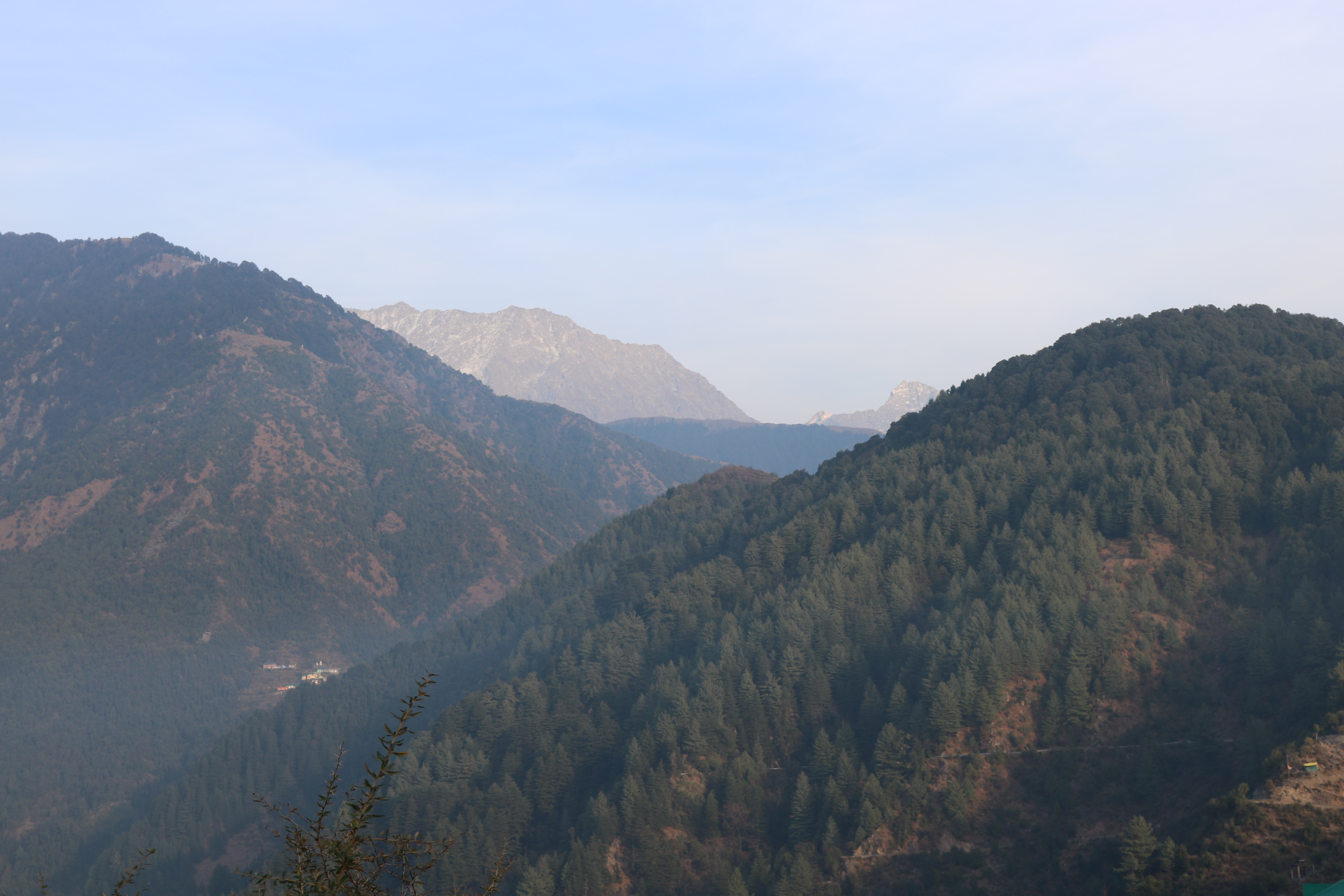
- Clockwise from top-left: View of Solan, Lutru Mahadev Temple, Arki, Palace of Nalagarh, Hills near Kasauli, Timber Trail at Parwanoo

- Location in Himachal Pradesh
- Solan district
- Coordinates (Solan): 30.9059°N 77.0925°E
- Country: India
- State: Himachal Pradesh
- Headquarters: Solan
- Tehsils: 1. Solan, 2. Kasauli, 3. Nalagarh, 4. Arki and 5. Kandaghat 6. Baddi 7. Ramshehar

Government
  - Lok Sabha constituencies: Shimla (Lok Sabha constituency) (shared with Sirmour and Shimla districts)
  - Vidhan Sabha constituencies: 5

Area
  - Total: 1,936 km^{2} (747 sq mi)

Population (2011)
  - Total: 580,320
  - Density: 299.8/km^{2} (776.4/sq mi)
  - Urban: 18.22%

Demographics
  - Literacy: 85.02%
  - Sex ratio: 880

Languages
  - Official: Hindi
  - Additional official: Sanskrit
  - Regional: Mahasui: (Baghati; (Baghliani); (Hinduri)
- Time zone: UTC+05:30 (IST)
- Average annual precipitation: 1253 mm
- Website: http://hpsolan.nic.in/

Solan district is one of the twelve districts of the Himachal Pradesh state in northern India. The city of Solan is the administrative headquarters of the district. The district occupies an area of 1936 km^{2}. It is culturally part of the historical Mahasu region.

== History ==
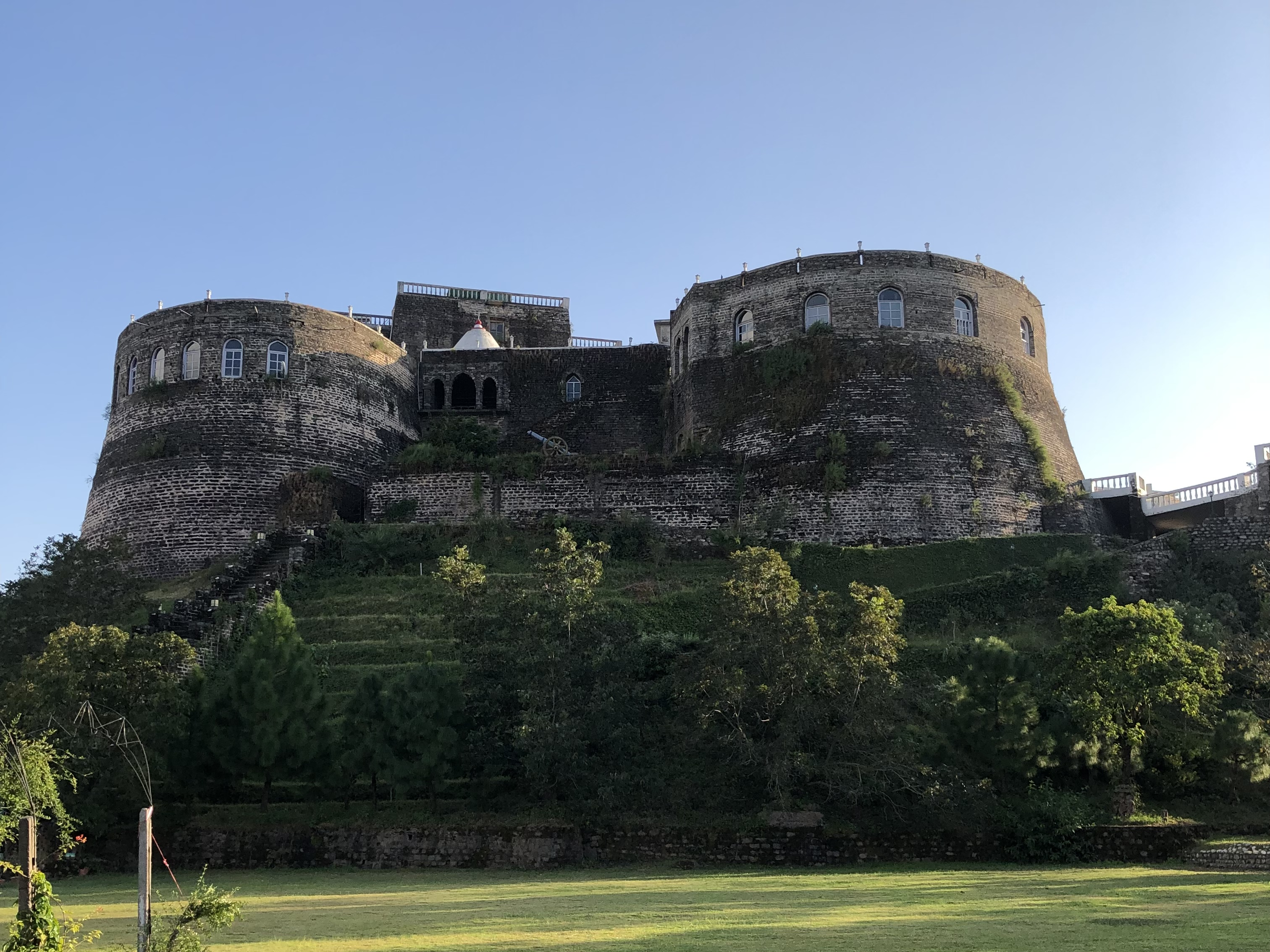
Ramshahr fort near Nalagarh, district Solan

The territory of the present-day district comprises the territories of the erstwhile princely states of Baghal, Baghat, Kunihar, Kuthar, Mangal, Beja, Mahlog, Nalagarh and parts of Keonthal and Koti and hilly areas of the erstwhile Punjab State which were merged with Himachal Pradesh on 1 November 1966. This district came into existence on 1 September 1972. The district was carved out by amalgamating Solan and Arki tehsils of the erstwhile Mahasu district and Kandaghat and Nalagarh tehsils of the erstwhile PEPSU. The name of the district as well as its headquarters comes from Mata Shoolini Devi. It's said that she saved Solan from being destroyed.

== District administration and Central Government offices ==
=== Legislative Assembly constituencies ===
The district comprises five Vidhan Sabha constituencies: Arki, Nalagarh, Doon, Solan and Kasauli. All of these are part of Shimla (Lok Sabha constituency).

No.	Constituency	Member	Party	Remarks	Reference
50	Arki	Virbhadra Singh^{‡}	Indian National Congress	Member until July 2021	
50	Arki	Sanjay Awasthy	Indian National Congress		
51	Nalagarh	Lakhwinder Singh Rana	Indian National Congress	Defected From INC To BJP In August 2022	
51	Nalagarh	Lakhwinder Singh Rana	Bharatiya Janata Party	Defected From INC To BJP In August 2022	
52	Doon	Paramjeet Singh Pammi	Bhartiya Janata Party		
53	Solan (SC)	Dhani Ram Shandil	Indian National Congress		
54	Kasauli (SC)	Dr. Rajiv Saizal	Bhartiya Janata Party	Health and Family Welfare Minister	

=== Divisions ===
The district is divided into four sub-divisions: Solan, comprises Solan and Kasauli tehsils, Nalagarh, Arki, and Kandaghat. Nalagarh, Arki and Kandaghat sub-divisions comprise Nalagarh, Baddi, Ramshehar, Arki, and Kandaghat tehsils respectively.

For administrative purposes, the district has been divided into seven tehsils, namely Solan, Kandaghat, Kasauli, Nalagarh, Arki, Baddi, Ramshehar and five sub-tehsil namely Krishangarh, Darlaghat, Mamligh and Panjehra. There are five blocks in the district namely Solan, Kandaghat, Dharampur, Nalagarh and Kunihar. There are 211 panchayats in the district covering 2383 villages.

The deputy commissioner is the head of the district, with the office at Solan town, which is the seat of district administration and location of several government offices. There are

- Mini Secretariat at bypass containing D.C. Office, S.P. Office, SDM Office, NIC, DYSSO, District Statistical Office, D.R.O., Copying Agency, DRDA, Zila Parishad, District Treasury Office, ASP, DSP, DF&SC, etc.
- PWD circle office near the hospital on tank road. It houses the office of S.E., HP PWD, Solan circle.
- Public Works Department complex on Solan bye-pass. It has offices of Executive Engineer (National Highways), Executive Engineer, HP PWD Solan Division, Assistant Engineer Horticulture Sub Division, etc.
- District Industries Centre at Chambaghat. It has offices of GM, Industries and Mining officer.
- Tehsil Office at Kotla Nallah on Rajgarh road.
- District Public Relations Office near Gurudwara at Saproon.
- Town & Country Planning Office near Dohri Dwar on Barog Bye-pass.
- XEN, Public & Health office near Dohri Dwar on Barog bye-pass.
- Deputy Director, Animal Husbandry on Jaunaji road
- District Agriculture office & District Horticulture office at Chambaghat.
- Chief Medical Officer's Office at Chambaghat.
- District Education Office (Primary & Secondary) at Chambaghat.
- Offices of HPSEB near Power House at Saproon.
- District Courts on the Mall road near Saproon.

A number of Central Govt. Offices too have their own departmental buildings.

- Ministry of MSME, Govt. of India
- N.R.C.M. (National Research Centre for Mushroom)
- C.I.P.M.C. (Centre for Investigation of Pest Management & Control)
- Z.S.I. (Zoological Survey of India)
- E.T.D.C. (Electronics Testing and Development Centre)

The offices at Baddi:

- The Baddi Barotiwala Nalagarh Development Authority (BBNDA)
- HP State Pollution Control Board Regional Office Baddi
- Govt Fire Service Department
- Central Drug Standard Control Office (CDSCO) Subzonal Office
- State Drug Controller, Baddi
- Deputy Director, Industries, Baddi

== Demographics ==
Religions in Solan district (2011)
Religion	Percent
Hinduism	94.53%
Islam	2.53%
Sikhism	2.40%
Other or not stated	0.54%
Distribution of religions

According to the 2011 census the district has a population of 580,320, giving it a ranking of 532nd in India (out of a total of 640). The district has a population density of 300 inhabitants per square kilometre (780/sq mi). Its population growth rate over the decade 2001-2011 was 15.9%. Solan has a sex ratio of 880 females for every 1000 males, and a literacy rate of 85.02%. 17.60% of the population lives in urban areas. Scheduled Castes and Scheduled Tribes make up 28.35% and 4.42% of the population respectively.

Languages of Solan district (2011)
1. Hindi (39.5%)
2. Pahari (29.7%)
3. Punjabi (8.92%)
4. "Other" Hindi (6.45%)
5. Handuri (5.61%)
6. Baghati (2.58%)
7. Nepali (2.35%)
8. Bhojpuri (1.42%)
9. Others (3.45%)

At the 2011 census, 39.47% of the population identified their language as Hindi, 29.70% named it Pahari, 8.92% Punjabi, 6.45% "Other" Hindi (including 5.61% Handuri, 2.58% Baghati, 2.35% Nepali and 1.42% Bhojpuri.

Historical population
Year	Pop.	±% p.a.
1901	141,698	—
1911	112,318	−2.30%
1921	125,258	+1.10%
1931	118,110	−0.59%
1941	127,921	+0.80%
1951	168,271	+2.78%
1961	192,664	+1.36%
1971	237,514	+2.11%
1981	303,335	+2.48%
1991	382,268	+2.34%
2001	500,557	+2.73%
2011	580,320	+1.49%

District Highlights of 2011 Census

- Solan district occupies the 4th rank among the districts in terms of population.
- Solan district stands at 2nd position in terms of the urban population in the state.
- Solan district occupies 11th position in sex ratio by registering 880 females per 1000 males against state average of 972 females. This sex ratio has slightly improved from 852 females in 2001 to 880 in 2011.
- Solan district stands 4th in terms of its working force having total workers of 298,737 persons against 3,559,422 working persons of the state.
- Solan district stands at 2nd positions in terms of decadal population growth (2001–2011) of 15.9 per cent persons in comparison to state decadal population growth of 12.9 per cent persons.
- In terms of density of population per km^{2}. Solan district with 300 persons per km^{2}. stands at 4th rank in the state.
- Solan district occupies 4th rank among the districts of the state in terms of the literate population. It has a literate population of 428,578 persons.
- The economy of Solan district is more or less dependent on agriculture. It has returned 141,267 persons as cultivators and holds the 8th position among the districts of the state.
- Solan district is known for its exquisite climate which attracts a large number of tourists from the plains around the year. Shivalik range of mountains full of diverse flora and fauna make Solan district as a whole an exhilarating experience.
- Solan district has an important place on the tourist map of the state with famous tourist places like Solan town, Chail, Kasauli, Barog and Dagshai.
- Solan is famous for the production of off-season vegetables. Because of the high production of Mushroom the town of Solan still holds the fame of the Mushroom City of India.
- Solan is also known as City of Red Gold as a large number of tomatoes are produced in the region.

== Economy ==
=== Agriculture ===
Agriculture is the prominent feature of Solan district. It is the main occupation of the inhabitants of Solan district and about 60 per cent of people are dependent on their livelihood on agriculture and its allied activities. Maize, wheat, and barley are the main crops and onion, pulses and peas are the main cash crops grown in many parts of the district.

Vegetables like cabbage, turnip, beans, ladyfinger, tomato, radish, chilies, garlic, etc. are grown in many parts of the district. Besides this cultivation of mushroom in the district is also very high. So much so that N.R.C.M. (National Research Centre for Mushroom), Central Government Body is located in Solan town. People not only involved in the agriculture of the mushroom but they also use it for preparing Pickles, Murabas, and soups of mushroom. Because the cultivation of mushroom is very popular in Solan, so people call the city of Solan as "Mushroom City".

=== Horticulture ===
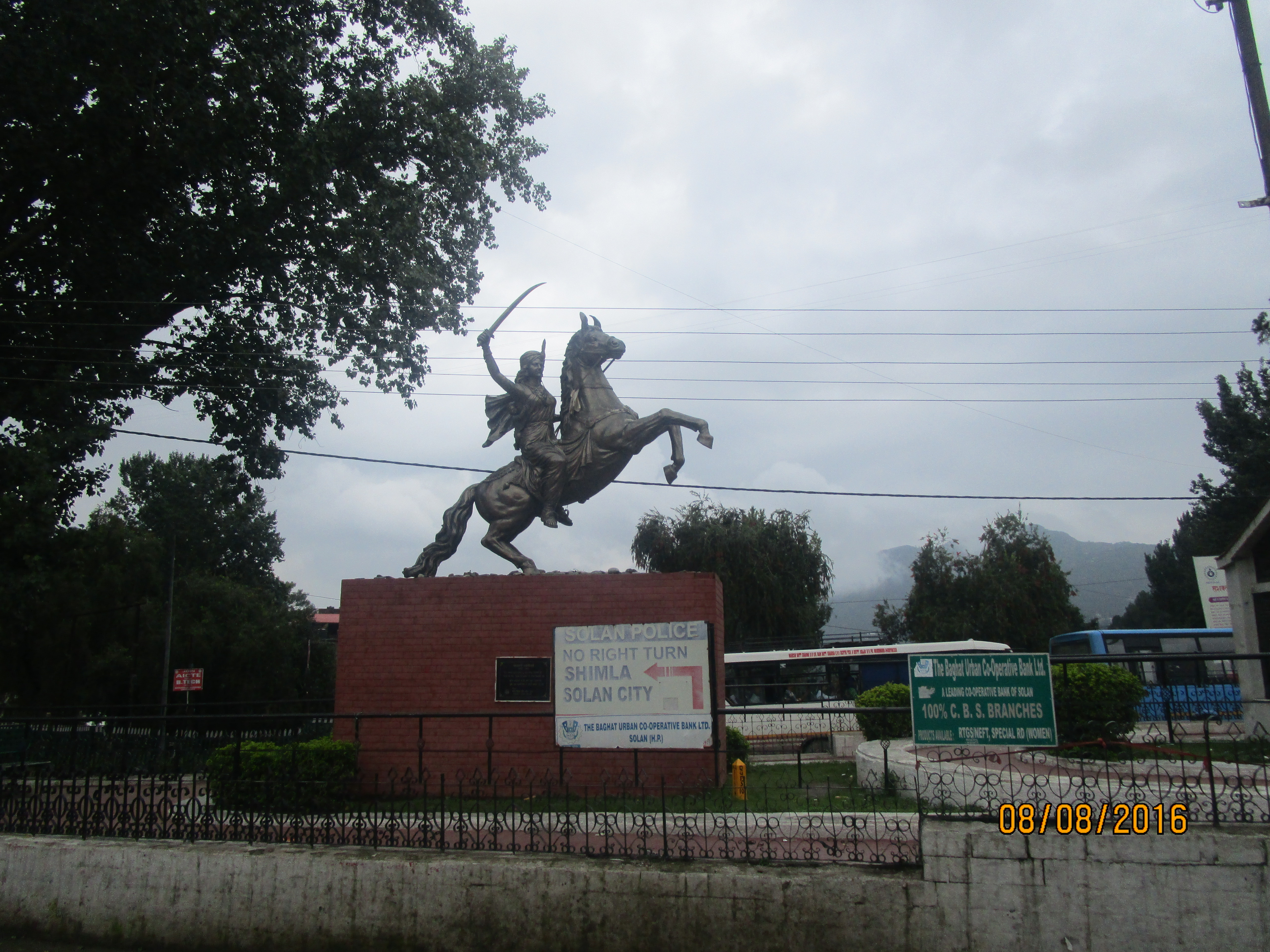
A Statue at Solan

The climatic and geographical conditions of the Solan district provide the good scope for the development of the horticulture. People of the district prefer horticulture over the agriculture and the area under horticulture is increasing year after year in the district. Apricot, plum, pear, mango, banana, grapes and kiwi etc. are the main fruits of this district. In addition to this some natural and traditional fruits such as chulli and brahmi are also grown. These fruits are used for making wine, juices, squashes, pickle etc. Edible oil is extracted from the seeds of chulli in this district. The chulli oil is used for cooking purposes.

The people of this area are slowly and steadily shifting from traditional agriculture activities to the horticulture and the area covered under horticulture is rising steadily with significant increase in fruits production.

Horticulture is not only providing fruits to eat but also provide good scope in the fruit processing industries. As such cash crops constitute the main stay of economy. Even Government of Himachal Pradesh has given priority to create and improve horticulture in Solan district.

=== Animal husbandry ===
Animal husbandry is a traditional practise by the farmers along with agriculture. It gives them another source of income. Any surplus milk and butteroil is sold in the town which offers quick returns and near stable price.

=== Trade and Commerce ===
The major towns in the district are popular in the surrounding area. So they show good level of trade and commerce activities. The district headquarter Solan town has an organised sabzi mandi with supporting facilities constructed at Kather on Solan by pass. This Mandi is popular since farmers are getting handsome return of their produce.

== Industry ==
There are three main industrial hubs in Solan district:

- Industrial Estate, Parwanoo
- Industrial Estate and electronic complex, Chambaghat, Solan
- 35-km-long industrial corridor named Baddi-Barotiwala-Nalagarh, or BBN, for official purposes.

BBN has emerged as a global Pharma hub.

== Tourism ==
There are many places of interest in Solan.

- Maa Shoolini Devi temple on Shilli Road
- Jatoli temple rajgarh road (India's Highest Shiv temple)
- Badi ki dhar
- Mohan Meakin Breweries, the oldest distillery in India and one of the oldest in the world
- Barog railway station
- Kasauli
- Chail
- Chakki Mod Waterfall
- Malaun Fort, location of a decisive battle in the Anglo-Nepalese War (1815)

== Education ==
=== Central government ===
- Dr. Yashwant Singh Parmar University of Horticulture and Forestry

=== Private universities ===
- Baddi University of Emerging Sciences and Technologies, Baddi, District. Solan
- Chitkara University, Himachal Pradesh, Barotiwala, District. Solan
- Jaypee University of Information Technology, Waknaghat, District. Solan
- Maharaja Agrasen University
- Manav Bharti University, Kumarhatti, District. Solan

=== Motilal Nehru Central State Library ===
Motilal Nehru Central state library is situated on The Mall, Solan. Established on 29 June 1959, it is the only Central State Library in Himachal Pradesh. All the schools and public libraries in the state come under it. Till 1973 the library was running a certificate course in library science, and had even initiated the Mobile Library project to benefit youth in rural areas of the state.

This library is Responsible for managing all school & public libraries in the state. There are thousands of precious and valuable books housed in this library. This library is centrally located above PNB on The Mall Solan.

== Notable people ==
- Ruskin Bond - Author and poet
- Ajay Thakur - Indian Kabaddi player
- Bhawana Sharma - Indian Handball player
- Bimla Kashyap Sood - Ex Member of Parliament and social worker
- Dhani Ram Shandil - Ex Member of Parliament
- Rajeev Bindal - Speaker Himachal Pradesh Vidhan Sabha
- Ram Prasad Bairagi, Freedom fighter of 1857
- Tisca Chopra - Bollywood actress
- Bikramjeet Kanwarpal - Bollywood actor
