= Mahasu Pahari =

Indo-Aryan and Western Pahari language of India

- Mahasui
- 𑚢𑚩𑚭𑚨𑚰𑚃, महासुई
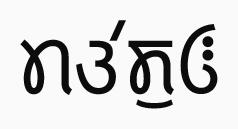
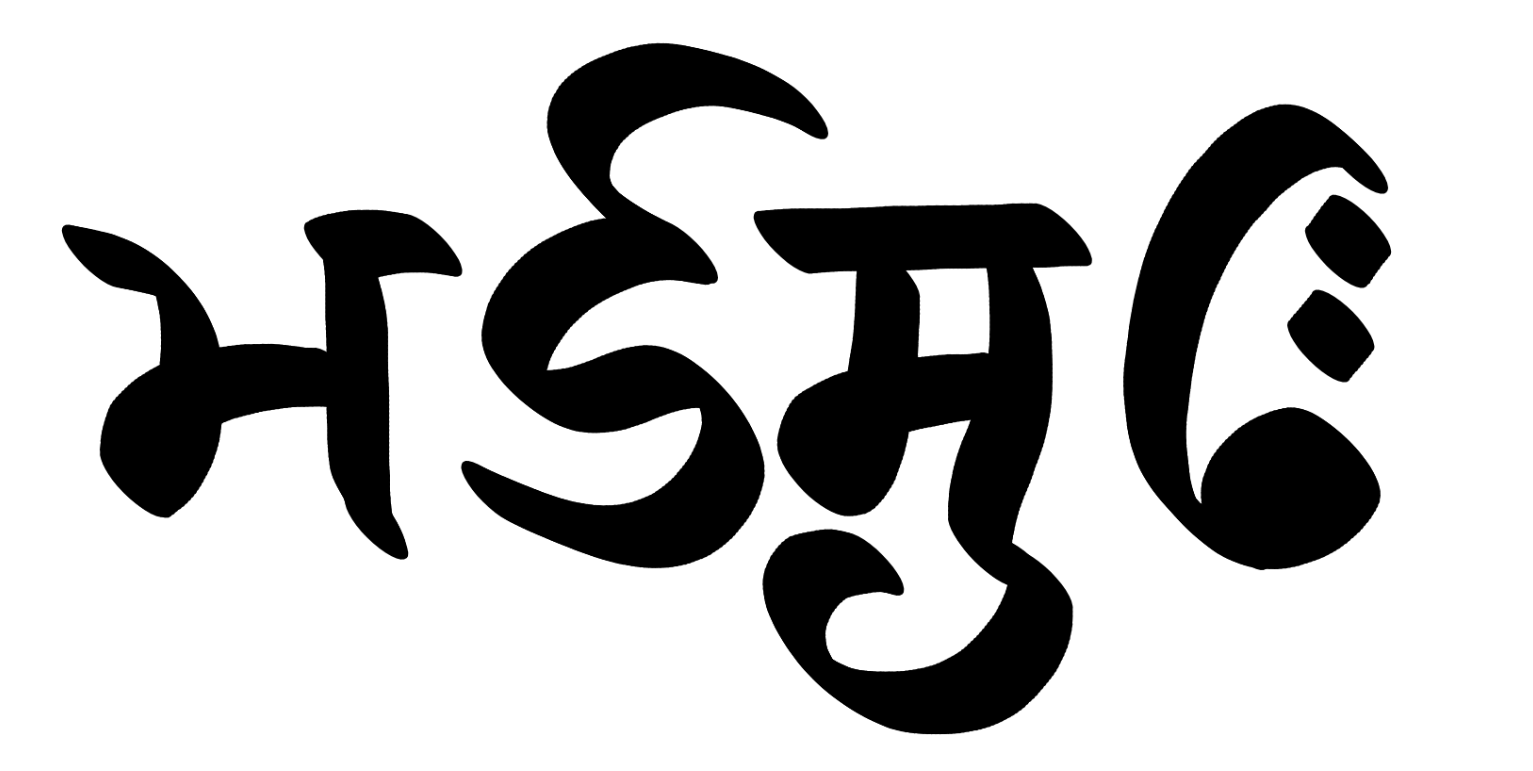
- Mahasui written in Tankri script and Bushahri script.
- Native to: Himachal Pradesh; Uttarakhand; Haryana
- Region: Mahasu
- Ethnicity: Mahasui people
- Native speakers: 1 million (2002)
- Language family: Indo-European: Indo-Iranian; Indo-Aryan; Northern; Western Pahari (Himachali); Mahasu Pahari
- Writing system: Tankri script, Devanagari

Language codes
- ISO 639-3: bfz
- Glottolog: maha1287
- ELP: Mahasu Pahari
- Baghati

Mahasu Pahari (Takri: 𑚢𑚩𑚭𑚨𑚱 𑚞𑚩𑚭𑚪𑚯) is a Western Pahari (Himachali, Takri: 𑚩𑚮𑚢𑚭𑚏𑚥𑚯) language spoken in Himachal Pradesh. It is also known as Mahasui or Mahasuvi. The speaking population is about 1,000,000 (2001). It is more commonly spoken in Himachal Pradesh's Shimla and Solan districts, in western parts of Uttarkashi district in Uttarakhand and in Kalka and Pinjore of Panchkula district in Haryana. It is to be known that Shimla and Solan were parts of the old Mahasu district. Himachal Pradesh State on 1 September 1972 reorganised the districts dissolving Mahasu district. The Solan district was carved out of Solan and Arki tehsils of the then Mahasu district and tehsils of Kandaghat and Nalagarh of the then Shimla District of Punjab.

== Extent ==
A sample for Mahasuvi language's Rohruri dialect

According to different locations, the language has developed several dialects. Lower Mahasu Pahari (Baghati, Baghliani, Keonthali), Upper Mahasu Pahari (Rampuri, Rohruri, Shimla Siraji, Sodochi). The Kiunthali variety appears to be understood by others, and their attitude toward it is favorable. Rampuri is also called Kochi; Rohruri is also called Soracholi; and Sodochi is also known as Kumharsaini or Kotgarhi after the Kumarsain and Kotgarh areas of Shimla District respectively. Intelligibility among dialects is above 85%. Lexical similarity is 74%–82% with upper dialects, and 74%–95% with lower dialects. The language is used in home and for religious purposes. It is understood and spoken from people of vital age group. It is considered to be highly endangered as the number of people speaking it is constantly going down. It is closely related to Sirmauri, Jaunsari, Bangani and Kullui.

== Dialects ==
Interview of a student in Rohruri dialect of Mahasu Pahari related to Wikipedia in Himachal Pradesh Central University

Mahasu Pahari has two main varieties, Upper Mahasu Pahari and Lower Mahasu Pahari. Each variety has several dialects.

- Upper Mahasu Pahari
  - Bishashau, spoken in Chaupal
  - Barari, spoken in Kotkhai
  - Kochi Rampuri, spoken in Rampur Bushahr
  - Kochi Rohruri, spoken in Rohru
  - Kuari, spoken in Dodra Kwar
  - Shimla Saraji, spoken in Theog and Narkanda
  - Shodochi, spoken in Jubbal
  - Shoracholi, spoken in Kumarsain
  - Tharochi, spoken in Kuppar and nearby areas of Jubbal and Kotkhai
- Lower Mahasu Pahari
  - Baghati, spoken in eastern Solan district and Kalka, Pinjore, etc areas of Panchkula district in Haryana
  - Baghliani, spoken in western Solan district, which mainly includes Arki, Darlaghat, Ramshahar and Nalagarh Tehsils
  - Keonthali, spoken in south-western Shimla district, which includes Shimla city, Junga and other nearby areas

Hinduri, spoken in eastern Nalagarh is also included in the Keonthali group of Mahasu Pahari.

== Script ==
The native script of the language is a variety of Takri Script. There are some written records of the language in Takri script and Nastaliq script but nowadays Devanagari script is usually used.

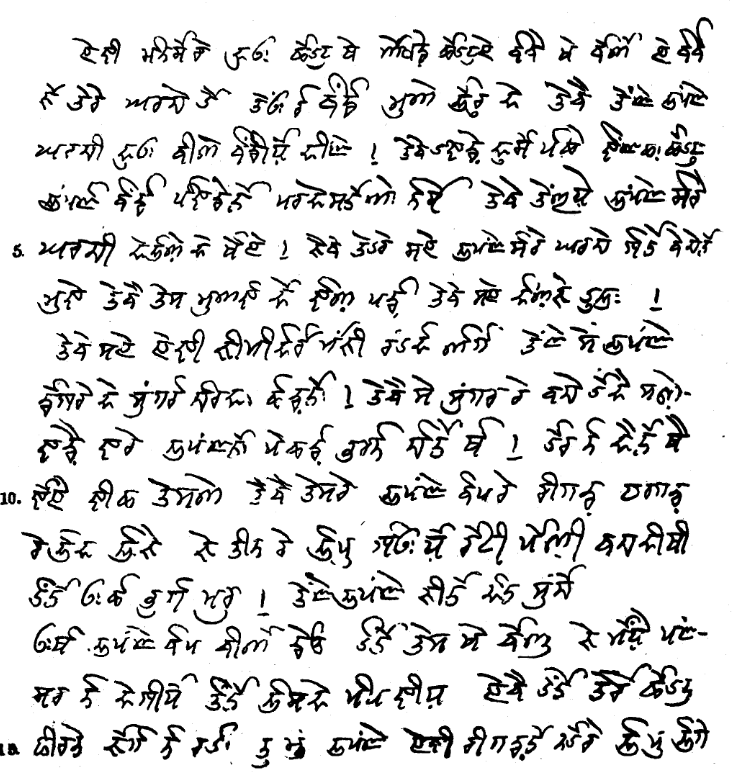
Specimen in Keonthali spoken around lower parts of Shimla district, which were parts of Keonthal state

== Phonology ==
=== Consonants ===
		Labial	Dental	Alveolar	Retroflex	Post-alv./ Palatal	Velar	Glottal
Plosive / Affricate	voiceless	p	t	ts	ʈ	tʃ	k	
Plosive / Affricate	aspriated	pʰ	tʰ	(tsʰ)	ʈʰ	(tʃʰ)	kʰ	
Plosive / Affricate	voiced	b	d	dz	ɖ	dʒ	ɡ	
Plosive / Affricate	breathy	(bʱ)	(dʱ)					
Fricative	voiceless			s		ʃ		ɦ
Fricative	voiced			z		(ʒ)		ɦ
Nasal		m		n	ɳ		(ŋ)	
Lateral				l	ɭ			
Trill/Tap				r	ɽ			
Approximant		ʋ				(j)	(w)	

- Sounds [tsʰ bʱ dʱ] are only seldom heard among dialects.
- Allophones of /b d ɡ/ are heard as [b̥ d̥ ɡ̊] in word-final position.
- [tʃʰ] occurs from Hindi loanwords.
- [ʒ] can be heard as allophone of /dʒ/.
- [ŋ] is heard when a nasal occurs before velar stops.
- /ɦ/ may also be heard as a voiceless [h] among dialects.
- [j, w] are mainly heard after vowels. [w] can also be an allophone of /ʋ/.

=== Vowels ===
	Front	Central	Back
Close	i iː		u uː
Mid	e eː	(ə)	o oː
Open-mid	ɛ		ɔ ɔː
Open			ɑ ɑː

Nasal vowels
	Front	Back	
	Front	short	long
Close	ĩ	ũ	ũː
Mid	ẽ	õ	õː
Open-mid		ɔ̃	ɔ̃ː
Open		ɑ̃	ɑ̃ː

- A short /u/ may also have an allophone of a near-close sound [ʊ].
- [ə] is mainly heard as an allophone of /ɑ/. /ɑ/ can also be heard as an open mid sound [ʌ].

== Status ==
The language is commonly called Pahari or Himachali. The language has no official status and is recorded as dialect of Hindi. According to the United Nations Education, Scientific and Cultural Organisation (UNESCO), the language is of definitely endangered category, i.e. many Mahasui children are not learning Mahasui as their mother tongue any longer. Earlier, the language had state patronage. Everything changed since independence, due to favoritism towards Hindi by the Indian Government.

The demand for the inclusion of 'Pahari (Himachali)' under the Eight Schedule of the Constitution, which is supposed to represent multiple Pahari languages of Himachal Pradesh, had been made in the year 2010 by the state's Vidhan Sabha. There has been no positive progress on this matter since then even when small organisations strive to save the language and demand it. Due to political interest, the language is currently recorded as a dialect of Hindi, even when having a poor mutual intelligibility with it.
