= Chharabra =

- Suburb
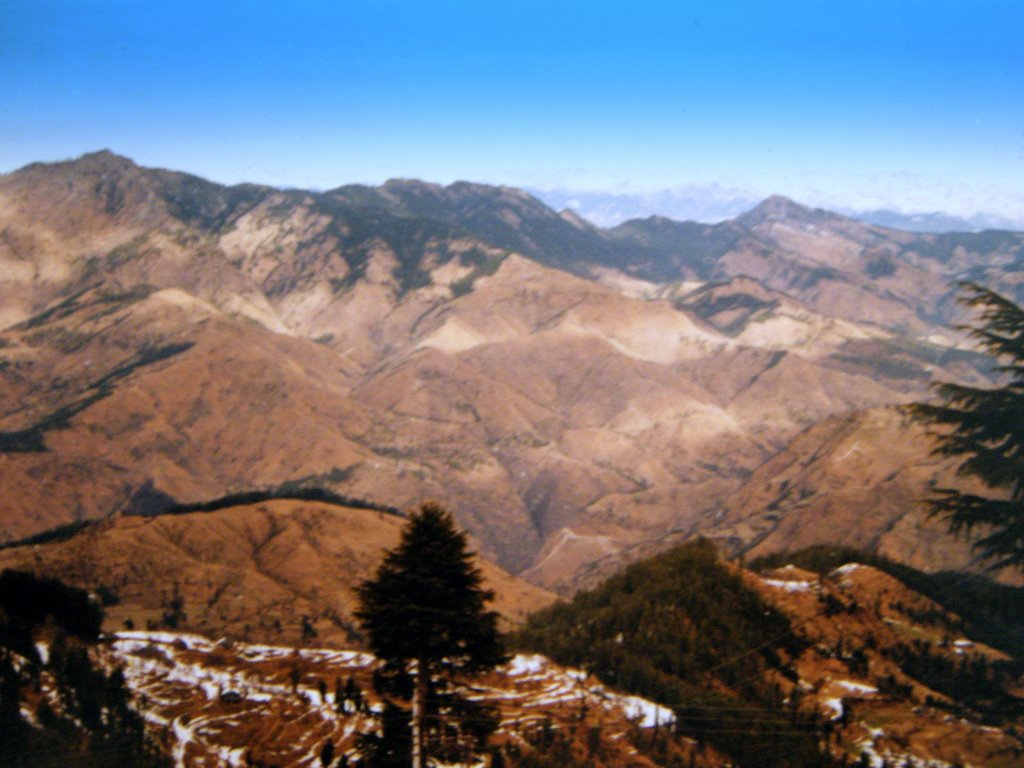
- Himalayas viewed from Chharabra
- Location of Chharabra near Shimla
- Coordinates: 31.115°N 77.245°E
- Country: India
- State: Himachal Pradesh
- District: Shimla
- Elevation: 2,514 m (8,248 ft)

Languages
  - Official: Hindi
- Time zone: UTC+5:30 (IST)
- PIN: 171 012
- Vehicle registration: HP

Chharabra is a suburb situated approximately 8250 feet (2514 m) above sea level, 13 km from Shimla, India, on National Highway 22 (Hindustan-Tibet Road).

It has the summer retreat of President of India, the summer residence of Governor of Punjab, a five star luxury hotel, a boarding school, and a helipad, even though the population is less than 500 people (including boarding school students and the staff of the president's retreat, governor's house and hotel). The village is surrounded by evergreen pine forests, and has views of the Himalayas.

The Pir Panjal Range of the Himalayas at more than 19,000 feet (5,800 m) high, Deo Tibba at 19,687 feet (6,001 m), Chota Shali and Shali peaks, Bandar Poonch peak, Rakt Dhar at 20,100 feet (6,100 m), and Badrinath at 23,190 feet (7,070 m) are all visible from here. Even though Chharabra is a separate village, it is officially considered part of Mashobra, which is a suburb of Shimla.

Chharabra is situated on top of mountains which are a major watershed. One side of Chharabra is part of the catchment area for the Yamuna river while the other side is part of the catchment area for the Satluj river. The entire area around Chharabra is densely forested and is part of Shimla Reserve Forest Sanctuary and Catchment Area.

== Flora and fauna ==
Chharabra is part of Shimla Reserve Forest sanctuary and catchment area. The natural vegetation comprises pine, oak, cedar or Himalayan deodar, rhododendron, maple and horse chestnut. The wildlife consists of jackals, kakkar (barking deer), and the occasional leopard, as well as numerous bird species such as the Himalayan eagle, pheasants, chikor and partridges.

During monsoons, many wild flower species, wild strawberries and other berries can be found in the forest. Chharabra has a good climate for apple cultivation, and there are a few apple orchards here. Cobra plant is plentiful during monsoons. The British introduced several trees and flowering plants, notably weeping willows, silver oak, and chestnut, from other parts of the world, which can be seen at Chharabra. The retreat, Hem Kunj, Dukani, Kalyani House and Wild Flower Hall had weeping willows on their grounds.

== Shimla Reserve Forest Sanctuary and Catchment Area ==
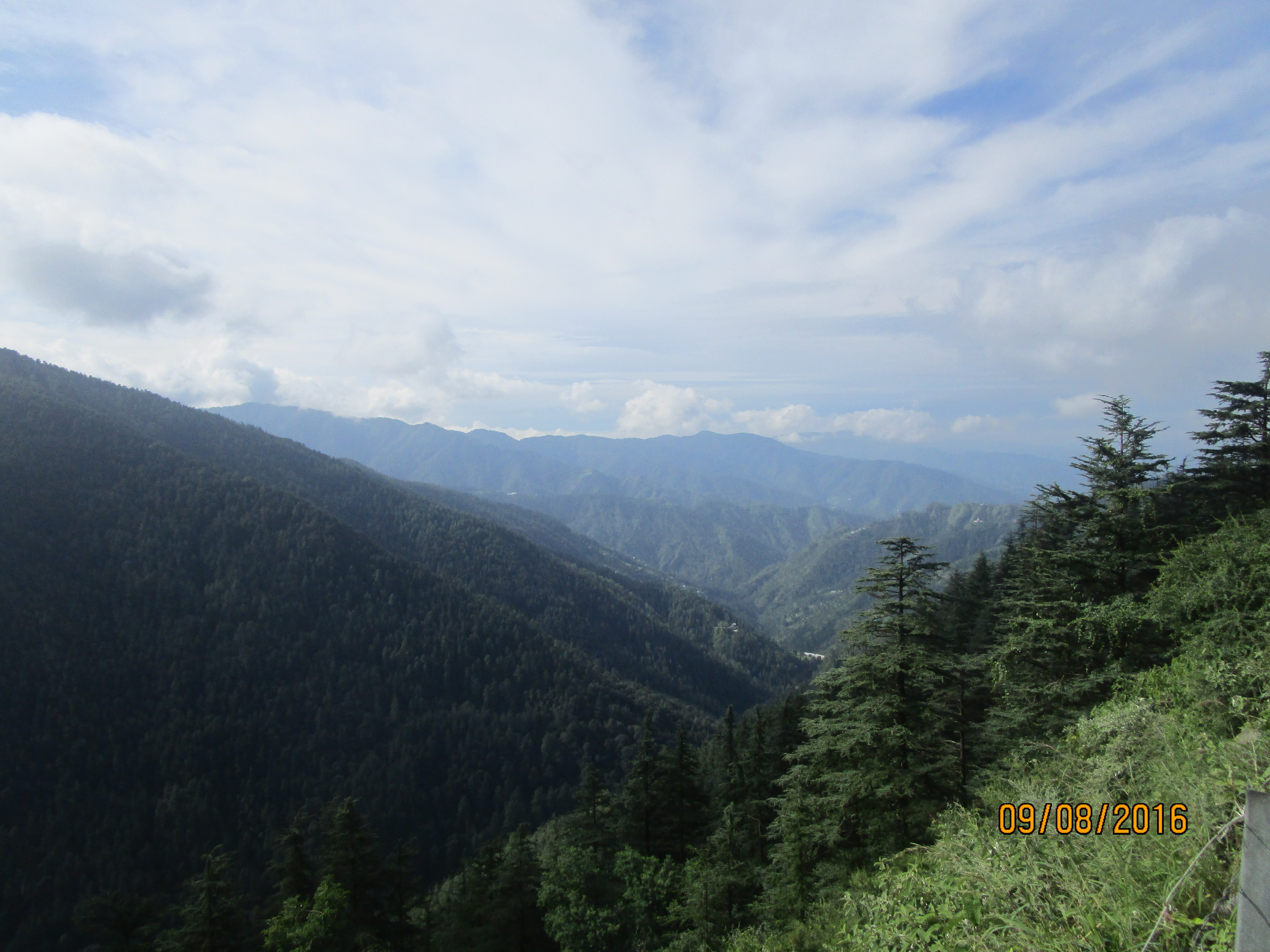
Shimla Reserve Forest

Shimla Reserve Forest Sanctuary and Catchment Area is situated adjacent to National Highway 22. It starts right after Dhalli and extends beyond Kufri. The area of this sanctuary is 951ha. The altitude ranges from 1,900 m to 2,620 m. The sanctuary is connected by a forest corridor to Chail Sanctuary in the south. This catchment is the main water supply for Simla. Nine perennial streams flow from this area, the main ones being Churat Nala and God Ki Nala. The sanctuary is closed to visitors. There is one rest house inside, and three outside the sanctuary.

== Climate ==
Mean monthly maximum and minimum temperatures range from 8.6 C in January to 24.1 C in July and from 1.9 C to 15.7 C, respectively.

Mean annual rainfall is 1600 mm. Annual precipitation is in excess of 1500 mm, over half of which falls during the summer monsoon.

Chharabra has temperate climate with four distinct seasons. Summer is the months of April to June, the rainy season (monsoon) is from July to August, autumn is from September to November and winter is from December to March.

Chharabra used to receive snowfall by end of November, but with global warming, there has been remarkable change in weather patterns here as well.

== Places of interest ==
=== The Retreat Building ===
The Retreat Building is the official summer residence of the President of India. Entry to the building is by permission only. The President visits Mashobra at least once every year, and during this time his/her core office shifts to The Retreat at Chharabra. The building housing the Retreat is a purely wooden structure originally constructed in 1850. It has dhajji wall construction, and a plinth area of 10,628 sq ft (987.4 m^{2}). The Retreat is the smallest of the Indian president's residences.

The building was originally constructed by the then Medical Superintendent of Simla, whose name is not known (referred to merely as Mr. C____ in Simla Past and Present by Edward J. Buck). The Retreat was taken on lease from Raja of Koti by Lord William Hay. During this period, the local population called it "Larty Sahib Ki Kothi", i.e. house of Mr. Larty, as Lord William Hay was named by locals. The lease deed contained stipulations that: the two roads from Simla and Mashobra village should, in the interest of native population of Koti State, be open to the public; no trees should be felled; and no cattle be slaughtered on the grounds. The lease of the Retreat was then taken by Sir William Mansfield, Commander-in-Chief, and then By Sir Edward Buck in 1881. In 1896, Raja of Koti used his right of preemption and took the possession of the estate. Thereafter the Retreat was consigned to the government on permanent lease by Raja of Koti. The Earl of Elgin was the first Viceroy of India to have used the Retreat as a viceregal residence. Lord Elgin secured use of the Retreat for future viceroys and constantly spent his weekends there.

After the Rashtrapati Niwas at Shimla was handed over to the Government of India in 1962 by the then president, Dr S. Radhakrishnan, in order to become an academic institute, the Indian Institute of Advanced Study, the Retreat was officially assigned to be the presidential mansion. The 16-room residence is surrounded by a 300-acre (1.2 km^{2}) forest.

=== Hemkunj ===
Hemkunj or Hem Kunj is the official summer residence of the Governor of Punjab, India. It was formerly known as Dane's Folly. It is situated on the road leading to the Retreat, between Wildflower Hall and the Retreat. The house was originally built by an Englishman called Mr Dane, who, believing that Shimla town would come up at this point, predicted that Shimla would come up on this side of the hill. However, as his prediction was proved wrong he named the house Dane's Folly. A new building was constructed next to the Dane's Folly building, which is used as the residence of the Governor of Punjab. Dane's Folly and the new building both still exist. The entire property has now been renamed Hemkunj.

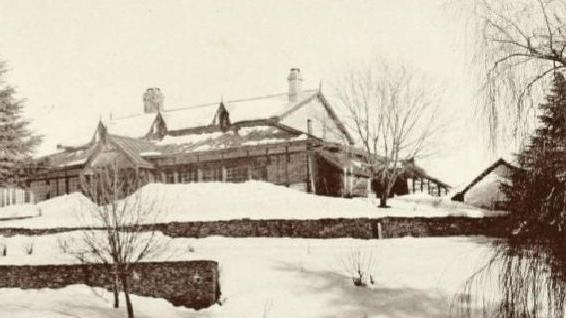
Wild Flower Hall Circa 1896

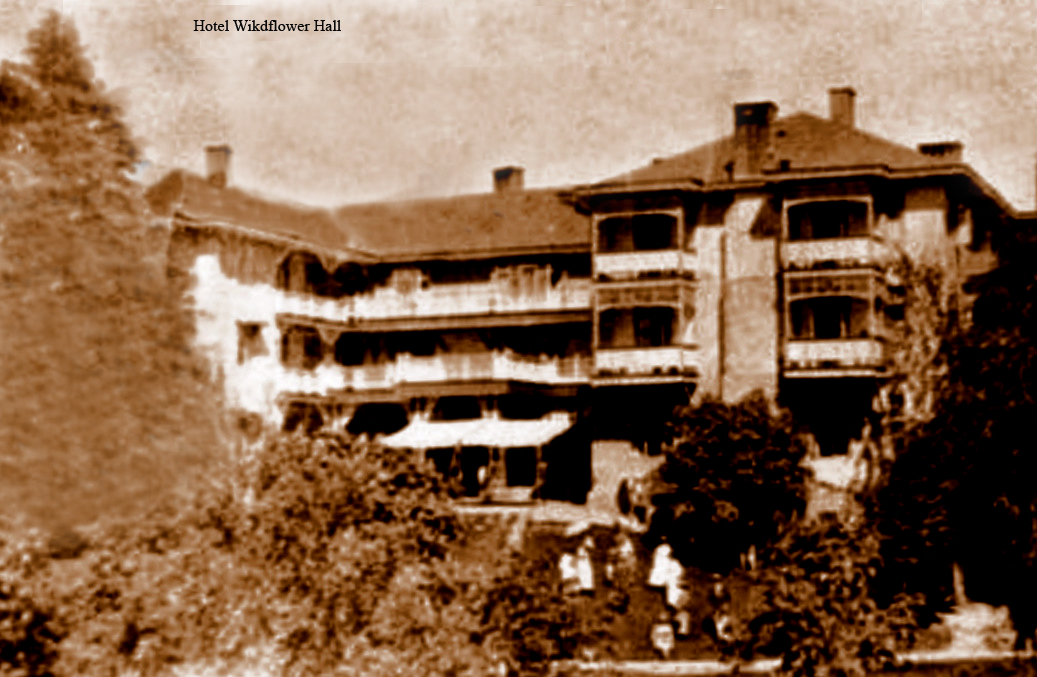
Second building of Wildflower Hall, burned down in 1993

=== Wildflower Hall Hotel ===
Wildflower Hall Hotel is a luxury hotel constructed on the site of the summer residence of Lord Kitchener of Khartoum. The original hall was located higher up than the present building. After the first building was burned, a second was constructed at the present site. The first owner of Wildflower Hall was G.H.M. Batten, CS, private secretary to Earl Lytton (1876–1880). The Hall is also said to have been a favourite retreat of Lord Ripon. The most famous resident of Wildflower Hall was the Commander-in-Chief of the Indian Armed Forces, Lord Kitchener, who spent a considerable amount of money laying out the gardens, and planting trees and flowers. Immediately upon his arrival at Shimla, Lord Kitchener secured lease of the property from the then owner Mrs. Goldstien.

In 1909, after Lord Kitchener returned to England, Wildflower Hall was sold to Robert Hotz and his wife. In 1925, after demolishing the old house, Mrs. Hotz erected a fine three-storey hotel.

After Independence, the hotel was taken over by the Indian Government, and given to the Himachal Government to run an agriculture school. It was taken over by the Himachal Pradesh Tourism Development Corporation in 1973 which then ran Wildflower Hall Hotel until 1993.

On 5 April 1993 the building was razed to the ground by a fire caused by an electricity short circuit. After this, the Himachal Pradesh Government formed a joint venture with the Oberoi Hotel Group to rebuild Wildflower Hall as a luxury hotel. The present building is the third building on the Wildflower Hall site.

=== Kalyani Helipad, formerly Dukani ===
There are views of the Himalayas, Shimla and the valley below from this point. This was originally the site of a two storied residential house called Dukani. Dukani was famous for its picnic grounds and terraced flower garden. The Straits Times reports of a competition called "Scents of Dukani" held here where people were asked to identify the smell of various flowers grown in the garden of Dukani.

Dukani was built by Lt. Col. Thomas David Colyear (died 8 August 1875) of 7th Bengal Cavalry. Amongst its famous occupants were Sir John Woodburn, Lt. Governor of Bengal Sir George Robertsoe, and Lt. Governor of Bengal Sir George Charles River. Other owners of Dukani included H.B. Goad and Maharaja of Alwar. This building was also owned by the late Sir Edward Buck, the author of Simla, Past and Present. The house was surrounded by an apple orchard.

After independence the property was taken over by the Government of India. The building was used by the State Horticulture Department until 1986 when it was razed to make way for the helipad.

== Educational institutions ==
Himalayan International School is a co-ed day and boarding school situated in the summer palace of the former Maharaja of Darbhanga called Kalyani House. The building was named after Maharani Kam Sundari (Kalyani) Singh, the third wife of Maharaja of Darbhanga Kameshwar Singh. This school was founded by Major General Jagjit Singh (Retd.) and the main patron was Maharani Kalyani Singh of Darbhanga. Jagjit Singh was also the first chairman of the school. The first principal of the school was Mrs. Indira Goswami.

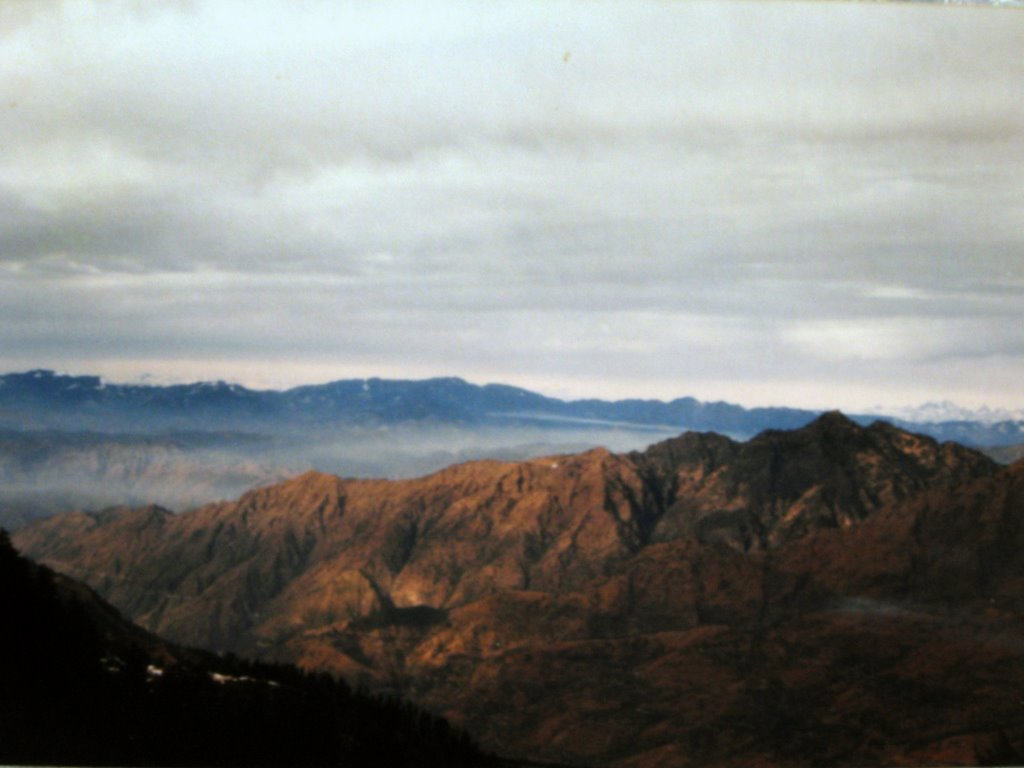
View of mountains from Chharabra

== Trekking around Chharabra ==
- A route leads from Chharabra to Kufri. It starts from Hotel Wild Flower Hall and leads through thick forests to Kufri Cantonment.
- The second route is from Chharabra to Mashobra through apple orchards and pine forests. This is a very scenic route with a great view of Himalayas. A metalled road leads to the Presidential Retreat. Near the gate of Himalayan International School, a trail on the right leads to Mashobra. One can also continue to the Presidential Retreat; a route leads to Mashobra from there.
- The third route leads from Chharabra to Dhalli. After reaching Himalayan International School, take the route to the left. This route leads through thick pine forests to Dhalli. There is a school for physically handicapped children on the way. This school is run by Government of Himachal Pradesh. A diversion from this route leads to Kalyani Helipad.

== Distance from major places in Shimla ==
- Distance from Shimla Railway Station - 12 km
- Distance from Shimla Airport - 30 km
- Distance from Kufri - 3 km
