= Junga, Himachal Pradesh =

Junga जुणगा
- Town
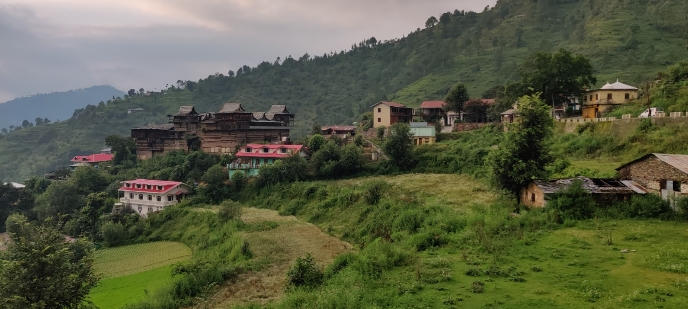
- Panaromic views of Junga
- Nickname: Chauri
- Location in Himachal Pradesh, India Junga (India)
- Coordinates: 31.02°N 77.18°E
- Country: India
- State: Himachal Pradesh
- District: Shimla
- Established: 1195AD

Government
  - Type: Gram Panchyat
  - Body: Gram Panchyat Junga
- Elevation: 1,582 m (5,190 ft)

Languages
  - Official: Hindi
  - Regional: Mahasu Pahari (Keonthali)
- Time zone: UTC+5:30 (IST)
- Pin Code: 171218
- Vehicle registration: HP-63

Junga is a tehsil in the Shimla district of Himachal Pradesh, India. Its original name (with diacritics) is Jūnga.

== Geography ==
Junga is located at 31.02°N 77.18°E. It has an average elevation of 1,582 metres (5,190 feet). It is located 26 kilometers away from the city of Shimla, 18 kilometers from Chail and 28 kilometers from the skiing destination Kufri. Junga is surrounded by green hills with snow-capped mountains and has a forest cover of kail, deodar, pine, cheel, ban and other trees .

== History ==
It is known for the palace of erstwhile Junga Princely estate. The estate of Junga, also known as Keonthal estate, was formed before 1800 AD.

== Climate ==
The temperature range is not very high, and the maximum temperature rarely crosses 25 °C during summers. Winters are cold due to the chilly winds from the Himalayas. Towards the north lies the snow-covered high ranges.

== Transport ==
Junga is well-connected by road and rail. The National Highway NH 22 connects Kandaghat to the nearest big city of Chandigarh. Junga is located at distance of 22 km from Kandaghat. The total driving time from Delhi to Junga is approximately 6.5 hours.

The nearest rail head is Kandaghat. The Kalka-Shimla Railway, a narrow gauge track, connects Kandaghat with Kalka. The Kalka-Shimla Railway is listed in the Guinness Book of Records for the steepest rise in altitude in a distance of 96 km. Kalka, the rail terminus in the plains, has daily departures to major Indian cities.

Flights from the airport at Jubbarhatti 35 kilometers away connects Shimla to Delhi.
