= Dhalli =

Neighbourhood in Shimla, Himachal Pradesh, India

- Neighbourhood
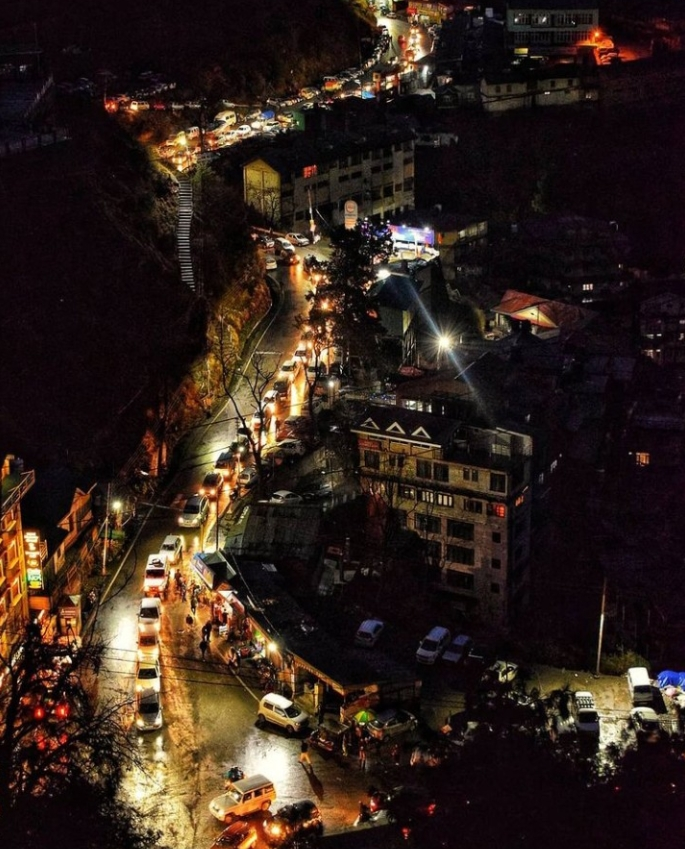
- Dhalli at night as viewed from uphill
- Interactive map of Dhalli
- Coordinates: 31.107036°N 77.210265°E
- Country: India
- State: Himachal Pradesh
- District: Shimla
- City: Shimla
- Elevation: 2,264 m (7,428 ft)
- PIN: 171012

Dhalli is a part of Shimla, in the North Indian state of Himachal Pradesh. It is the easternmost point of the main city Shimla. It is upcoming entrance of the city from Chandigarh-Shimla expressway.

== Connectivity and Importance ==
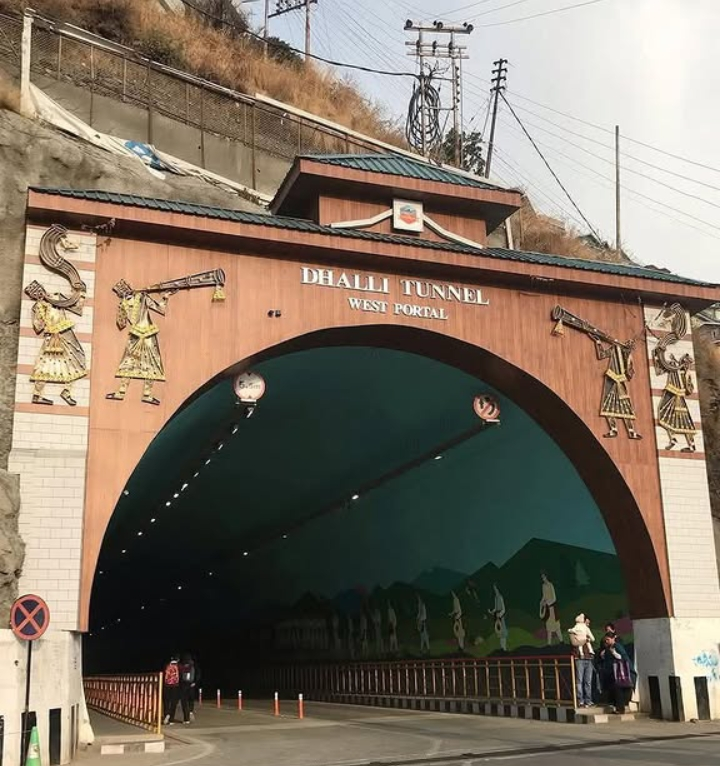
Dhalli Tunnel's west portal

Dhalli is a critical, high-traffic junction connecting Shimla to upper regions like Kufri, Narkanda, etc. currently undergoing major upgrades. Dhalli is well connected by other parts of the city mainly through Dhalli Tunnel, as well as it is the first and most prominent part of the city as it is the eastern-most entrance of the city. It is situated on NH-5 which makes it important strategically too, which is also currently proposed for four laning till Rampur Bushahr. Dhalli is also an upcoming welcoming point of Shimla as Shimla-Chandigarh expressway will end in Dhalli itself. Dhalli also has Shimla and Kinnaur district's largest Apple Mandi Corporation. It has emerged as one of the populous and densely populated parts of the city.

== Geography ==
Dhalli is situated among Deodar forests, it is the middle point between Sanjauli and Kufri, Mashobra. As like other parts of the city it also nestled between dense forests, it has scenic deep valleys, high mountainous ridges, especially Sanjauli-Dhalli ridge which lies in continuity from Sanjauli to Dhalli.
