= Ghanahatti =

Suburb and village in Shimla district, Himachal Pradesh

Ghanahatti घणाहट्टी
- Suburb
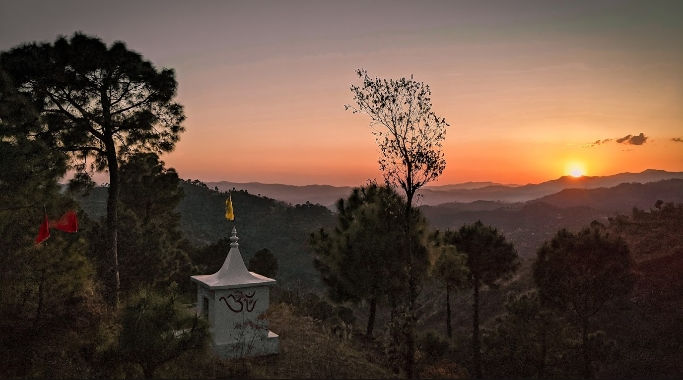
- Panoramic views of Ghanahatti

- Location in Himachal Pradesh Ghanahatti (India)
- Coordinates: 31.138185°N 77.086519°E
- Country: India
- State: Himachal Pradesh
- District: Shimla
- Elevation: 1,772 m (5,814 ft)

Languages
  - Official: Hindi
  - Native: Mahasui (Keonthali)
- PIN: 171014

Ghanahatti is a suburb situated near Shimla, capital of North Indian state of Himachal Pradesh. It is now being developed as a satellite town to decongest Shimla city.

== History ==
The parts of Ghanahatti came under former princely states of Keonthal and Dhami. It lies in Shimla district, at the border of Shimla and Solan district.

== Geography ==
Ghanahatti is a small suburb and village near Shimla city which comes under Totu block. It lies in Deodar and Pine forests. Ghanahatti is located on NH-205 and NH-88, which is currently being upgraded to four lane.
