= Federico Peliti =

Italian sculptor

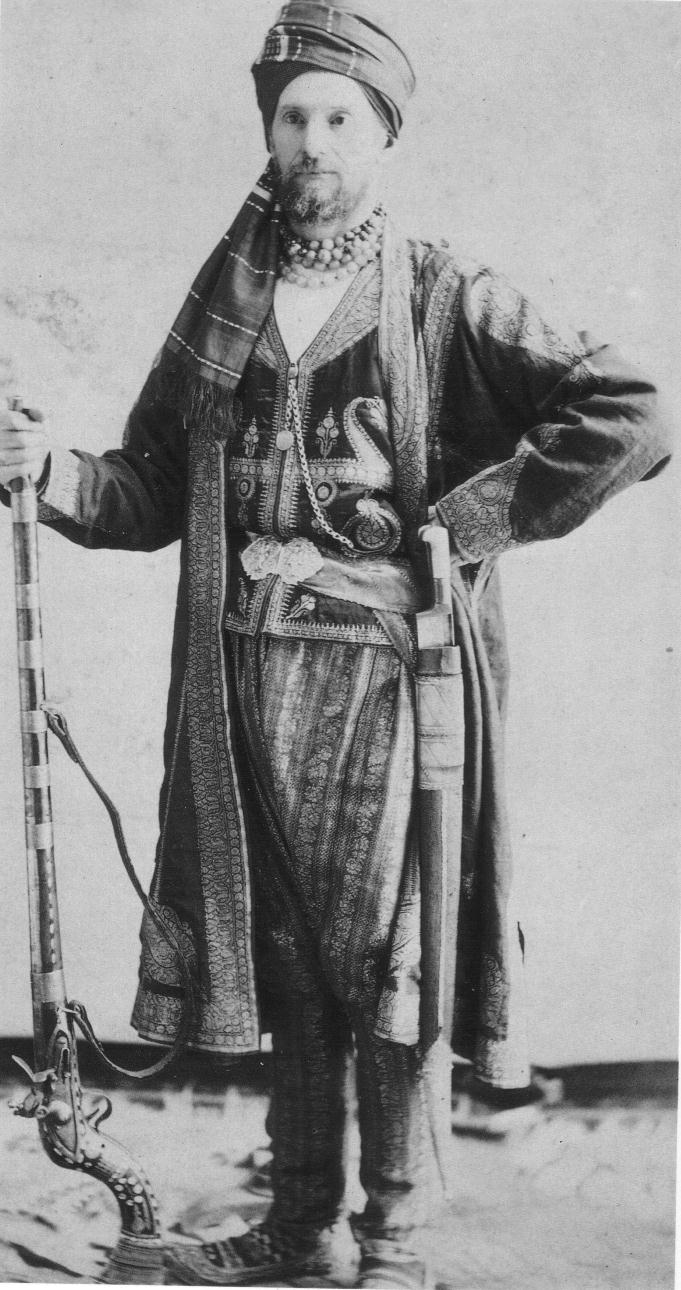
Federico Peliti in an Indian attire, photographed in his studio at Shimla

Federico Peliti (29 June 1844 – 28 October 1914) was a baker, confectioner, hotelier, manager of restaurants in Shimla and Calcutta, and an amateur photographer in British India. His restaurant in Shimla, Peliti's, was very popular and finds mention in numerous writings of the period including those by Rudyard Kipling. A collection of his photographs documenting British Indian life was published in Turin in 1994. He received a bronze medal from the French government in 1889 which entitled him to the title of Chevalier.

== Biography ==
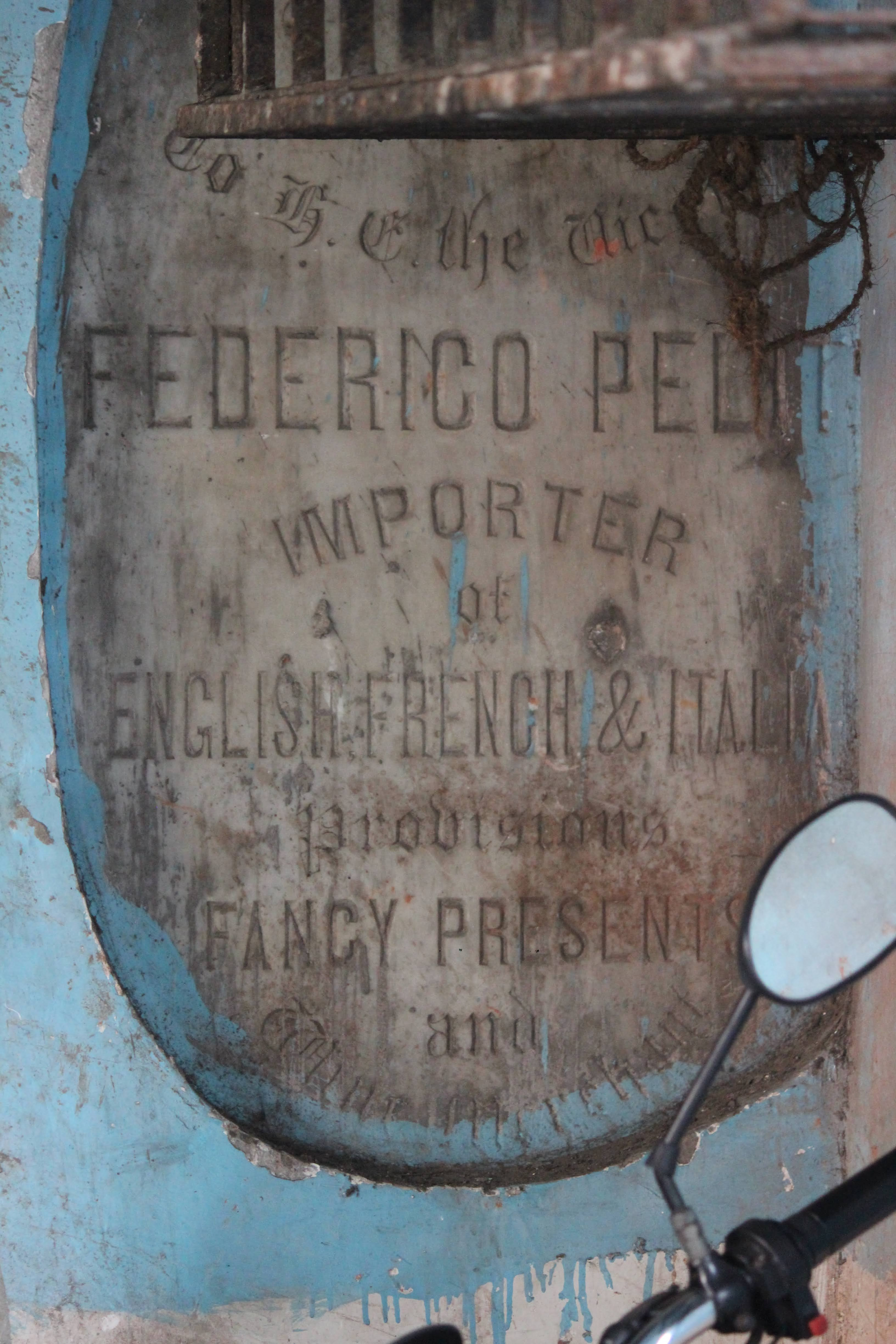
Peliti's at Kolkata, c. 2022

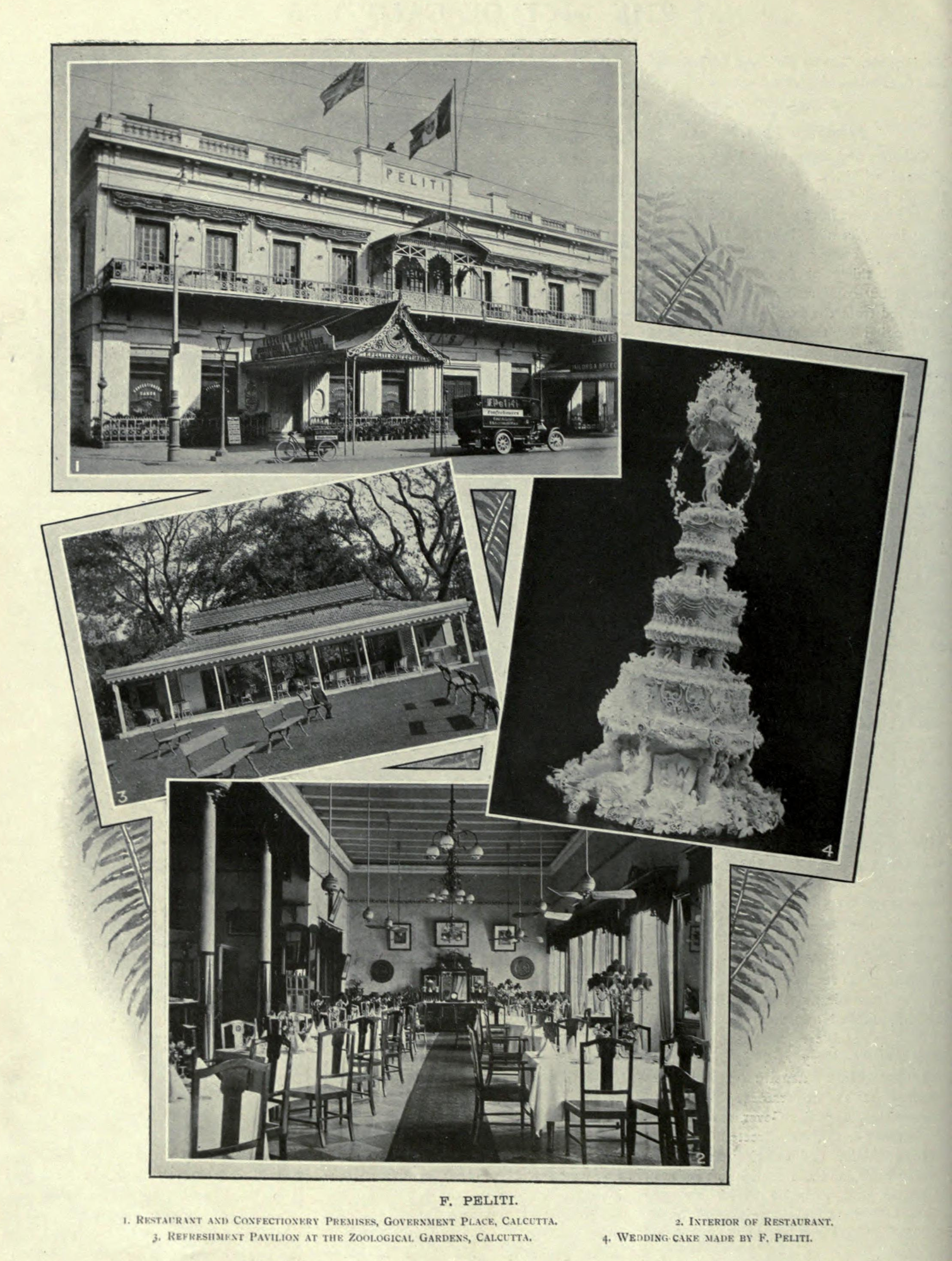
Peliti's restaurant in Calcutta, c. 1917

Peliti was born in Carignano. Descended from a family of surveyors from Valganna, he studied sculpture under Vincenzo Vela at the Accademia Albertina in Turin. He graduated in 1865 and joined the Third Italian War of Independence as a cavalier in the 1st Nizza regiment. Here he met some confectioners and pastry makers and learned theirs skills. Richard Bourke, 6th Earl of Mayo, Viceroy of British India in 1869 searched for a chef in Paris and held a competition which was won by Peliti. Peliti then moved to India and settled in Calcutta. In 1872, his employer Lord Mayo was assassinated and Peliti established O'Neill & Peliti, a bakery at No. 41 Bentinck Street. The partnership broke up and Peliti moved to 18/1 Chowringhee road in 1875. In 1881 he opened a restaurant at 10 & 11, Esplanade East which became popular among British high society and in the same year he also extended his operations in Shimla, the summer capital of British India. The cafe which was next to the Combermere bridge in Shimla had a terrace overlooking the valley and was very popular. He built a home in Mashobra called Villa Carignano (after the place of his birth) where he stayed. He was much sought after caterer. He catered for a lunch hosted by the Prince of Wales in Burma in 1891. Peliti also took to the hotel industry by establishing Peliti's Grand Hotel in Shimla at Bentinck castle. In 1884 he started a company that canned food for export. In 1883–1884 he won a medal at the Calcutta International Exhibition for confectionery; another medal in 1889 at the Universal Exhibition in Paris, and in 1895 Calcutta. In 1898 he received three gold medals at the National Exhibition of Turin including one for his photography. Peliti also trained a few other Italian confectioners such as Angelo Firpo from Genoa who set up another restaurant in Calcutta. Felice Cornaglia, a cousin and former associate took over the business in Bombay at the end of 1889.

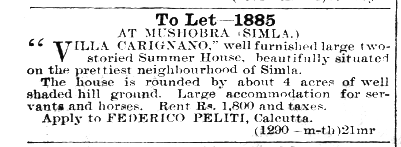
Rent advertisement for Villa Carignano, 1885

He married Judith Molloy, the daughter of an Irish British-Indian government official. In 1902 he started a new office in Calcutta and then handed over management to his sons Edoardo and Federico. He then moved back to Carignano in Italy where he died in 1914. A road in Carignano is named after him.

== In literature ==
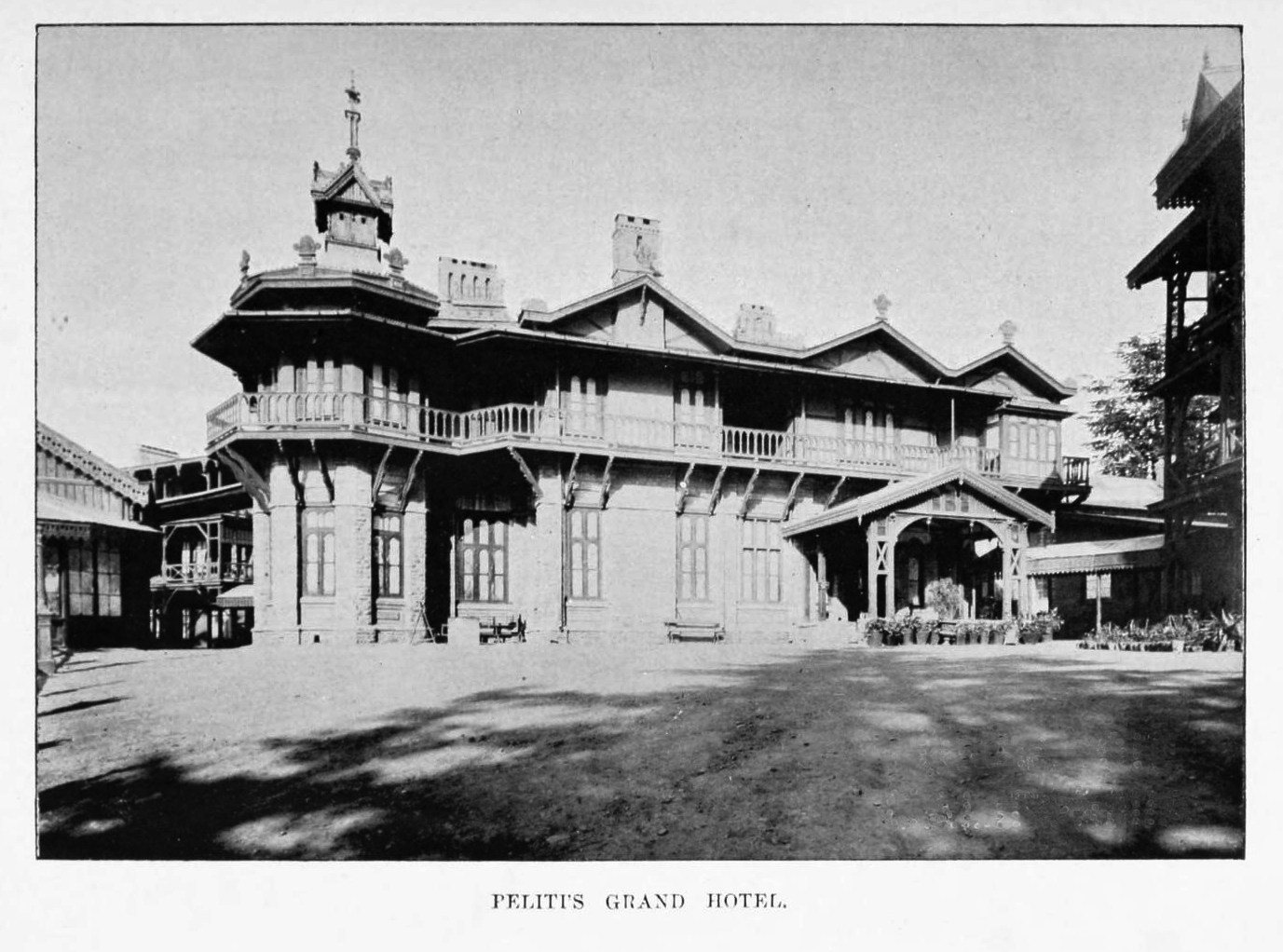
Peliti's Grand Hotel at Shimla was destroyed in a fire in 1922.

Peliti's restaurants were the centre of social activity both at Shimla and at Calcutta. The restaurant and cafe at Shimla was very popular with Shimla high society and Rudyard Kipling mentions Peliti's restaurant in several of his works. In his poem Divided Destinies (1885) he compares the life of a beggar with his (a Shimla resident's) and his beggar's claim to virtue is that he does not flirt with the wives of others at Peliti's. A poem to Peliti published in Punch magazine (1919) notes the flavour of the place.

Songs of Simla: Peliti's

I troll you no song that will hinder you long,
I pen you no ponderous treatise,
The theme that I sing is a gossamer thing
As light as the cakes at PELITI'S.

Grey roofs mid the pines and a heaven that shines
As blue as the water where Crete is,
The malachite green of a misty ravine,
That's the balcony view at PELITI'S.

There are mortals, may be, who abominate tea
(One's poison another man's meat is),
Who shy at the touch of a crumpet--for such
There is music and love at PELITI'S.

See that G.S.O.2 with the lady in blue;
Has she noticed where one of his feet is,
Or the issue that hangs on the plate of meringues
Which he buys her each day at PELITI'S?

Here the rulers of Ind, from the Salween to Sind,
Take their ices and wafers (MCVITIE'S)
And elaborate schemes over chocolate creams
At five-o'clock tea at PELITI'S.

And I think, when we die and the wraiths of us fly
To that peace which depends not on treaties,
The joys which we find will but serve to remind
Of the hours that we spent at PELITI'S.

— J.M.S., Punch, or the London Charivari. Volume 156. June 25, 1919

The restaurant at Calcutta was also a meeting place for some scholarly societies like the Calcutta Historical Society and the Institution of Electrical Engineers.

== Photography ==
Peliti trained in photography under Felice Bardelli (1849–1910) and set up a photography lab at his villa in Mashobra. He took an interest in documenting the picturesque, ethnic and exotic subjects. He associated himself with the Photographic Society of Bombay and with other pioneering photographers including Felice Beato, Bourne & Shepherd, and Lala Deen Dayal. His photography also documented his pastry creations and catering events.
