= Sanjauli =

- Neighbourhood
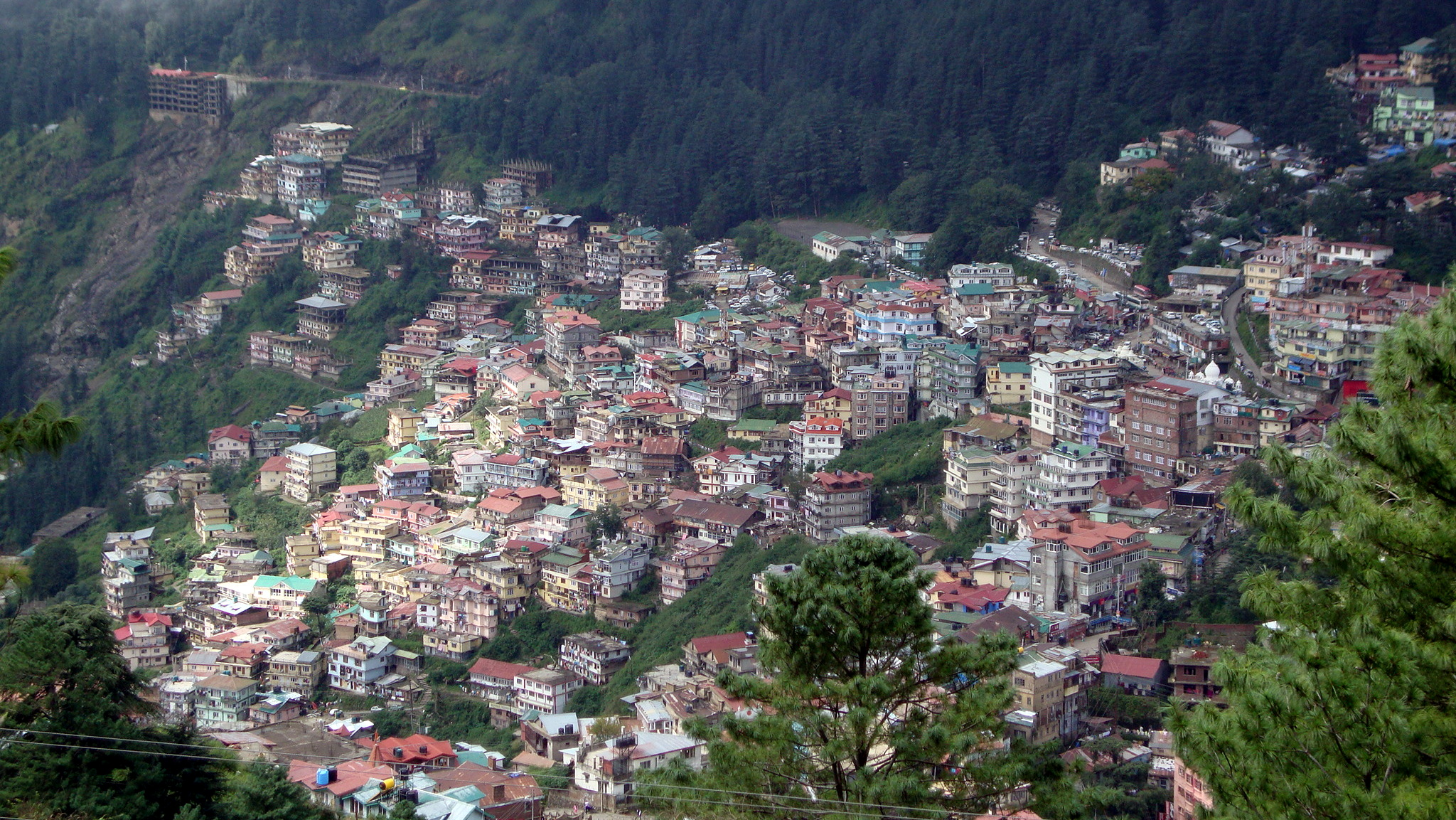
- Sanjauli from hilltop
- Location of Sanjauli in Shimla
- Coordinates: 31.103792°N 77.193031°E
- Country: India
- State: Himachal Pradesh
- District: Shimla

Area
  - Total: 5 km^{2} (1.9 sq mi)
- Elevation: 2,310 m (7,580 ft)
- PIN: 171006

Sanjauli is a major populous part of the city of Shimla, in the Shimla district of Himachal Pradesh, India.

== Geography ==
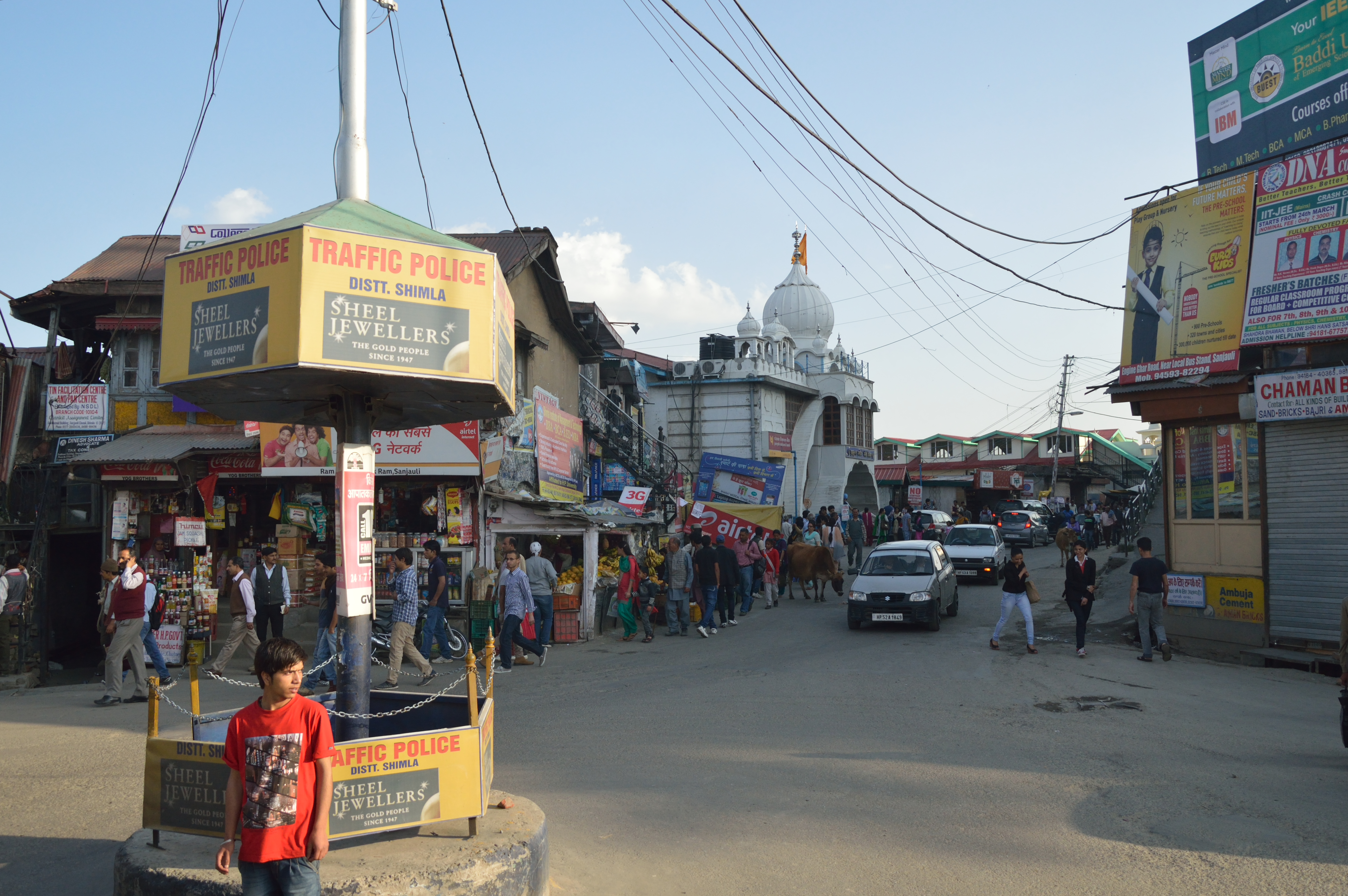
Sanjauli Chowk

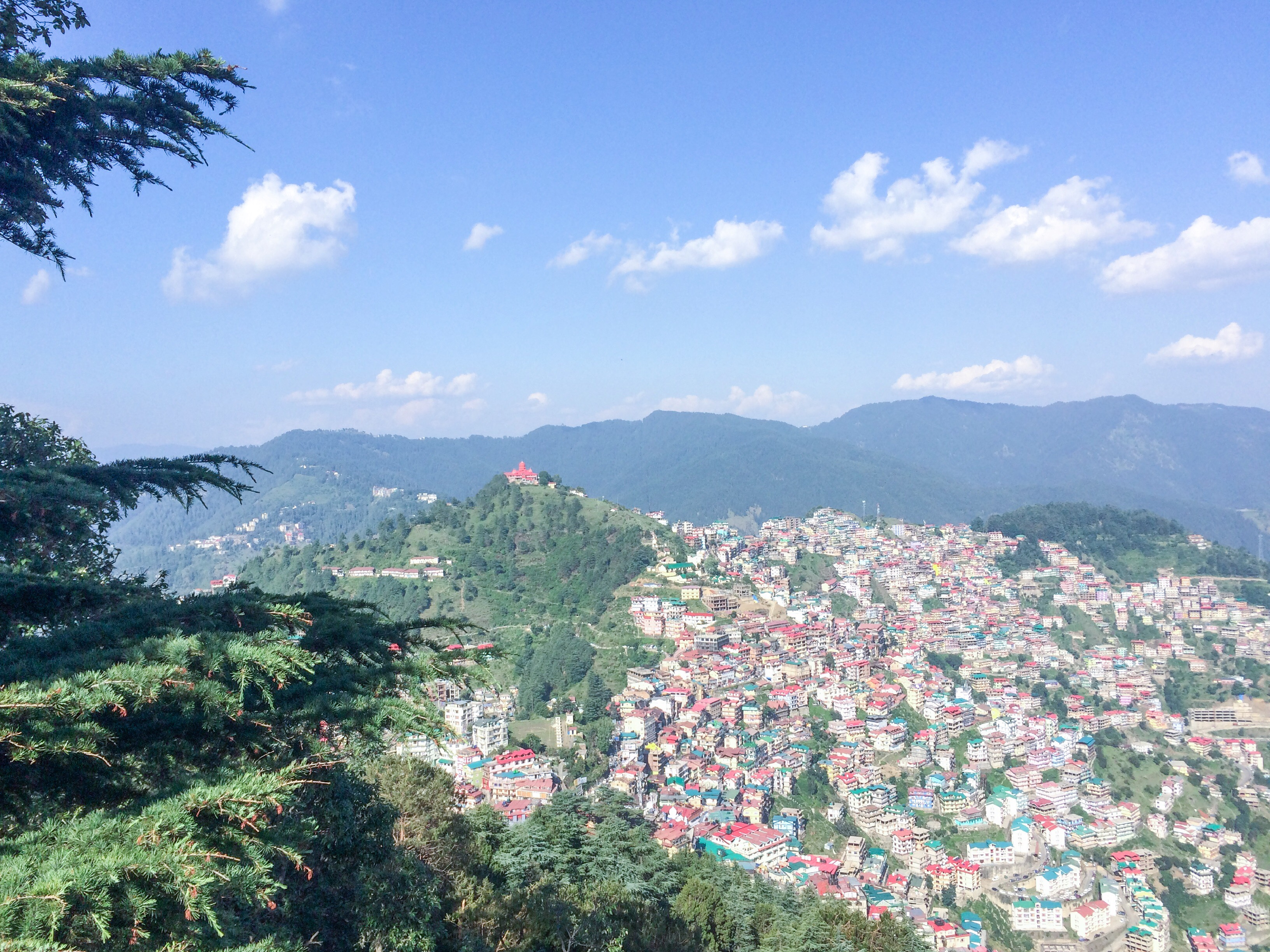
Uphill view of Sanjauli

Sanjauli is located in the north-western ranges of the Himalayas, at an average altitude of 2,398 metres (7,867 ft) above mean sea level. The main areas of the suburb comprises Sanjauli Bazaar, Engine Ghar, Cemetery Road, HB Colony, Chalaunthi, Sanjay Van, Dhingu Dhar, Shanan and Housing Board Colony and areas on the other side of the Sanjauli-Dhali tunnel built at the time when Shimla was the summer capital of British India. An area of unique architecture, there is a wide and long market area from Sanjauli Chowk to the tunnel. Sanjauli is situated below the Jakhu Hill and since 2008 there has been a bypass to Dhalli, which diverts from the main road near Government College and passes through Chalaunthi. It is accessible through the Circular road of Shimla as well as reachable on foot from Mall Road through Indira Gandhi Medical College & Hospital, which takes 20-25 minutes on a leisurely walk. It is one of the most highly populated areas of Shimla, since it extends over a large distance. It is situated atop a slope of a hill, which extends right from the Dhingu temple at the top to the Dhalli bypass road at the bottom.

== Transport ==
The Shimla-Dhalli bypass section of the National Highway 5 passes through Sanjauli.

In January 2026, a helicopter service was started by the government from the Chalaunthi helipad to Kullu, Chandigarh, and Rekong Peo.

== Education ==
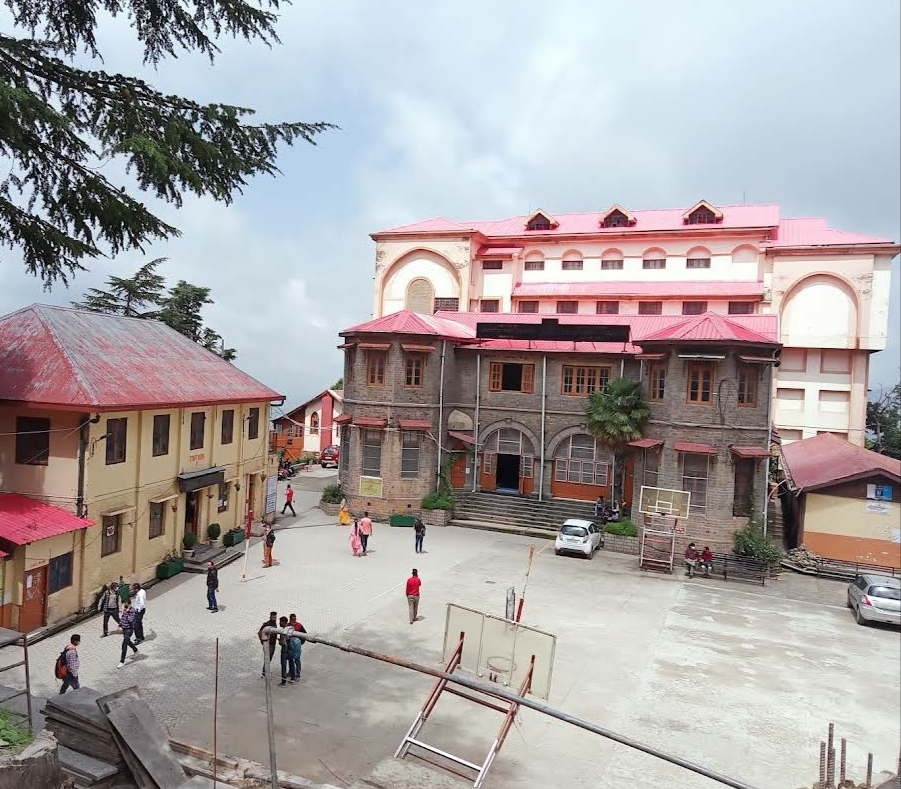
Govt. College Sanjauli

Sanjauli is home to the Government College Sanjauli, earlier Government College Shimla. This was the first degree college set up in Shimla in 1969 and the first to be conferred with the status of Centre Of Excellence in 2006. The college is affiliated with Himachal Pradesh University and stands close to the Indira Gandhi Medical College and Hospital. Navbhar is the location of the St.Bede's College and Convent of Jesus and Mary School There are also other Government schools, primary schools and play schools for little kids.

== Healthcare ==
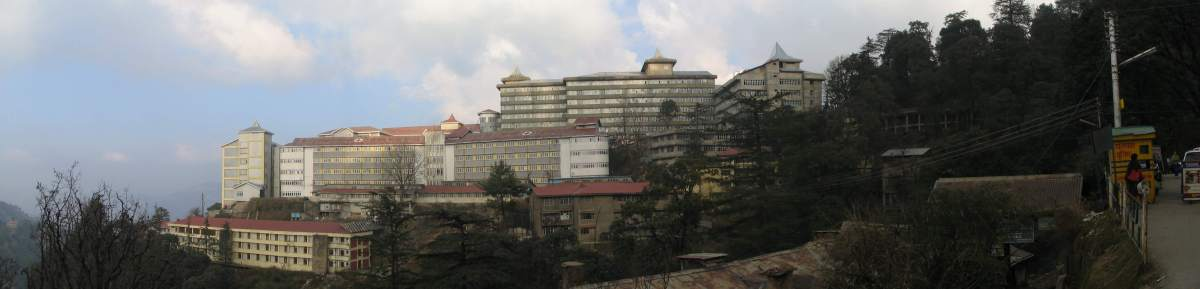
IGMC panorama

Sanjauli has the largest hospital and medical college of the state i.e. IGMC in Snowdown area, it also has four another major hospitals. In the locality of Sanjauli there is also a Primary Health Care Center and private practitioners.

== Nearby attractions ==
- Dhingu Mata Temple, atop Dhingu Hill
- Sanjauli Cemetery, the only cemetery in Shimla that is still in use. Presently it is used by Indian Christians, but was originally built by the British in 1921.
- Buddhist monastery, near the Dhingu Mata Temple
- Gurudwara, at Sanjauli Chowk
- Lakshmi Narayan Temple: It is one of the old temples in the region. In the Sapahatik Temple, a Crystal Shivlinga is housed, the only one of its type in Himachal Pradesh.
- Navbahar: St. Bedes' College is located here. The area is surrounded by conifers all around and gives a calm environment.
- Sanjauli Mosque, with a traditional Islamic architectural style
