= Government College, Sanjauli =

College in Himachal Pradesh

Coordinates: 31.1069°N 77.1884°E

- राजकीय महाविद्यालय, संजौली
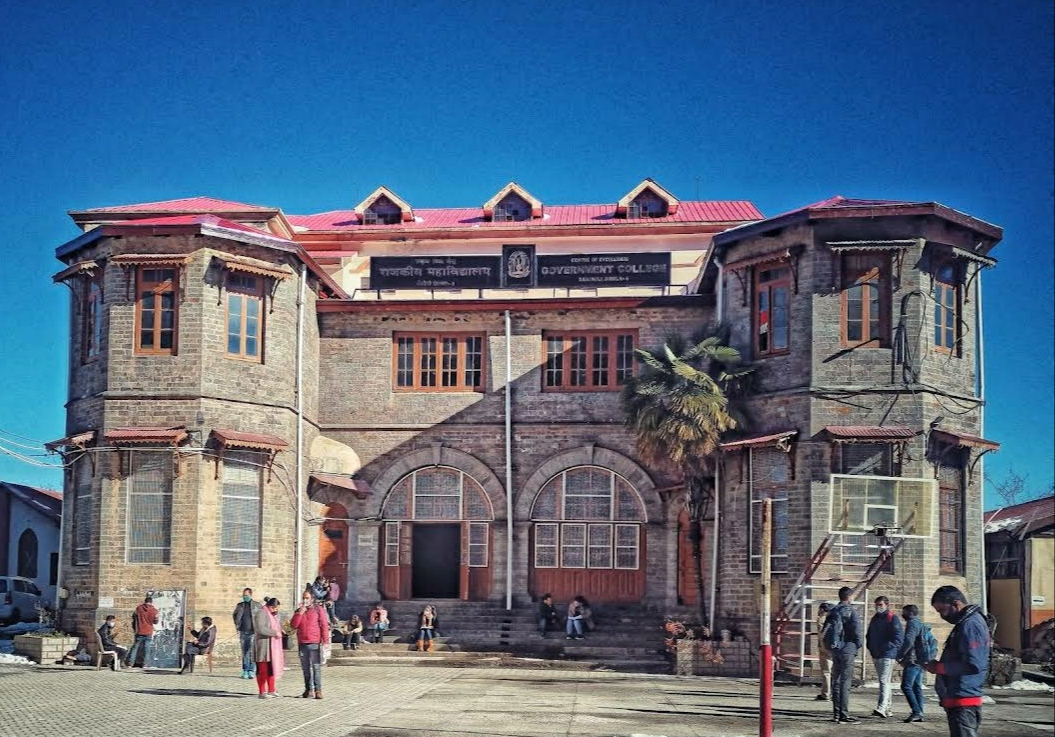
- Sanjauli College ground and Geography Block
- Former names: Government College, Simla
- Motto: "Tamaso mā jyotirgamaya"
- Motto in English: "From darkness, led me to light"
- Type: Co-Educational
- Established: 1969; 57 years ago
- Affiliations: Himachal Pradesh University
- Principal: Bharti Bhagra
- Faculty: 60
- Students: About 3500 UG/PG = About 3500
- Location: Sanjauli, Himachal Pradesh, India
- Campus: Urban
- Website: www.gcsanjauli.edu.in

Government College, Sanjauli, Shimla-6 is a college located in Sanjauli suburb of Shimla. It is affiliated with Himachal Pradesh University in Shimla, India.

== History ==
The college was established in 1969, firstly it was affiliated with Panjab University and the next year in 1970 it was affiliated to Himachal Pradesh University with its establishment. Then there were few departments such as Arts, Commerce and Science which was then extended in subsequent years.

Sh. Virbhadra Singh, Hon’ble Chief Minister, Himachal Pradesh, laid the foundation stone of the new Science Block on 22 September 2004.

In addition Financial Lab was inaugurated by honourable Education minister Sh. Suresh Bhardwaj in December 2018 which provide free of cost training to students (only commerce students are allowed to enjoy privilege of financial lab) on share trading and tally with GST etc. The college is well connected with open wifi support by Jio and smart class boards.

== Number of seats in each faculty ==
- B.A. 1st Year: 600
- B.Com 1st Year: 80
- B.Sc. 1st Year:
  - B.Sc. Life Sciences: Botany, Zoology and Chemistry : 140
  - B.Sc. Physical Sciences: Physics, Mathematics and Chemistry/Geology/Computer Science: 140
- B.Voc.:
  - Retail Management : 45
  - Tourism & Hospitality : 45

== Centre Of Excellence ==
Government College, Sanjauli, on the orders of the Govt. of Himachal Pradesh, has been declared a Centre of Excellence, vide notification No. EDN-A- Ja(1)-7/2005, dated 28-3-2006.

== Faculty ==
There are 54 permanent teachers out of which 25 have Ph.D and 27 have earned M. Phil. Degree. The number of Technical Staff is 15 and Administrative staff is 15.

== Extra-Curricular activities ==
The college is progressing in the extra co-curricular activities which is equally important in the growth of the student. Its many students are participating in the state as well as national competitions in various sports and activities. The College had the honour to host Group III items of Youth Festival, HPU, and Judo Championship during 2003–04; Group IV items of Youth Festival, HPU, and Basketball Championship during 2004–05; and Group IV item of Youth Festival, HPU, in 2005–06.

== Controversy ==
The college got into controversy many times such as the incident of 2015 when a girl alleged the principal of the college for unknown reasons and then some students slapped the principal, which resulted in the ugly fight among the students and teachers. In 2018 another incident happened when some students got in a fight related to political opposition. In January 2020 a student of the college was found dead in the drain between the Sanjauli and Lakkar Bazaar. It was not confirmed either the boy fell from the hillock or was murdered. Another incident happened when 188 students of the college caught to be engaged in the narcotics, which resulted in the suspension of those students.

== Student politics ==
The college has three major parties as opposition, ABVP, SFI, NSUI. Elections are not held in the college but the politics is still very strong in the college. The college oppose the decisions of the state government as well as of the university by slogans.

== Alumni ==
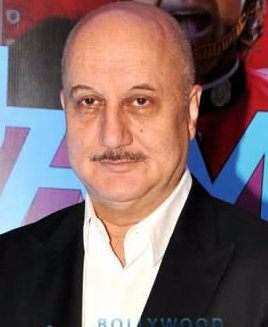
Anupam Kher

The college has a lot of alumni; two of its notable alumni are:

- Sanjay Karol, Judge of the Supreme Court of India, Chief Justice of Patna High Court and Tripura High Court
- Anupam Kher, Popular Indian actor
- Sukhvinder Singh Sukhu, Chief Minister Himachal Pradesh
