= Keonthali dialect =

Dialect of Lower Mahasu Pahari, India

Keonthali
- क्योंथली
- 𑚊𑚮𑚣𑚝𑚥𑚦
- Pronunciation: [kjoːn.tʰaː.li]
- Native to: Himachal Pradesh
- Region: Mahasu
- Language family: Indo-European: Indo-Iranian; Indo-Aryan; North-Western or Northern; Western Pahari; Mahasu Pahari; Keonthali
- Writing system: Takri

Language codes
- ISO 639-3: –
- Glottolog: maha1287
- Approximate location of Keonthali speaking area
- Coordinates: 31.087282°N 77.152888°E

Keonthali (Takri:𑚊𑚮𑚣𑚝𑚥𑚦) is a dialect of Lower Mahasu Pahari belonging to the Western Pahari group of languages (as per Grierson). It is spoken in lower parts of Shimla district in the North Indian state of Himachal Pradesh.

== Extent ==
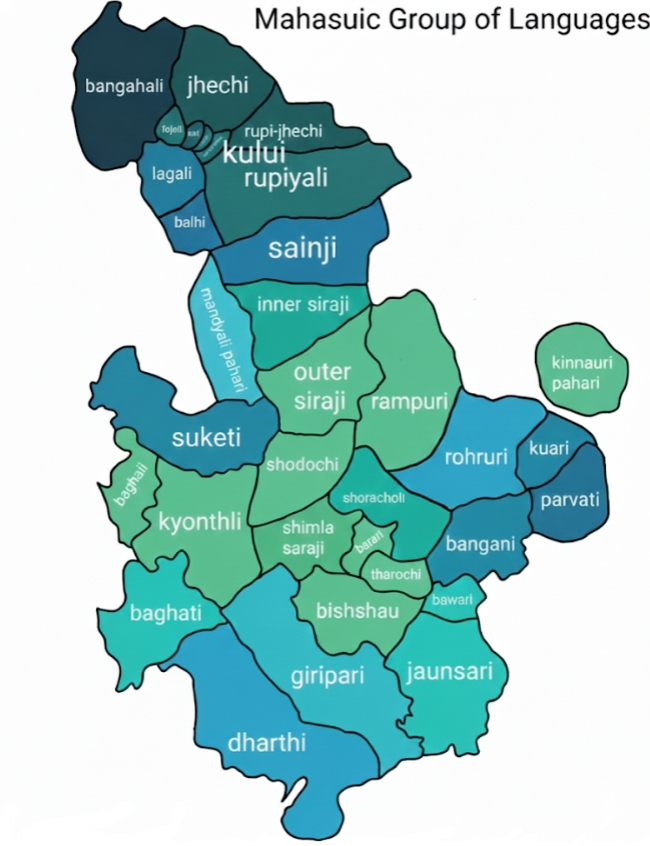
Map of Mahasuic group of languages, as Keonthali dialect is part of it

Keonthali dialect got its name from former princely Keonthal state, the dialect is spoken usually in the areas which were parts of the then Keonthal state. Today some of these areas include Shimla, capital of Himachal Pradesh, Junga (former capital of Keonthal), Kasumpati, Mashobra, Sunni, Kufri, Chail, Shoghi, Ghanahatti, Jubbarhatti, Dhami, Khatnol, etc.

== Script and specimen ==
Mahasu Pahari including Keonthali traditionally written in Takri, Pabuchi scripts. There are also some records of Mahasui written in Nastaliq script. Nowadays Devanagari script is usually used to write Mahasu Pahari which includes all its dialects as Keonthali.

Following is the specimen of Keonthali with its transliteration:

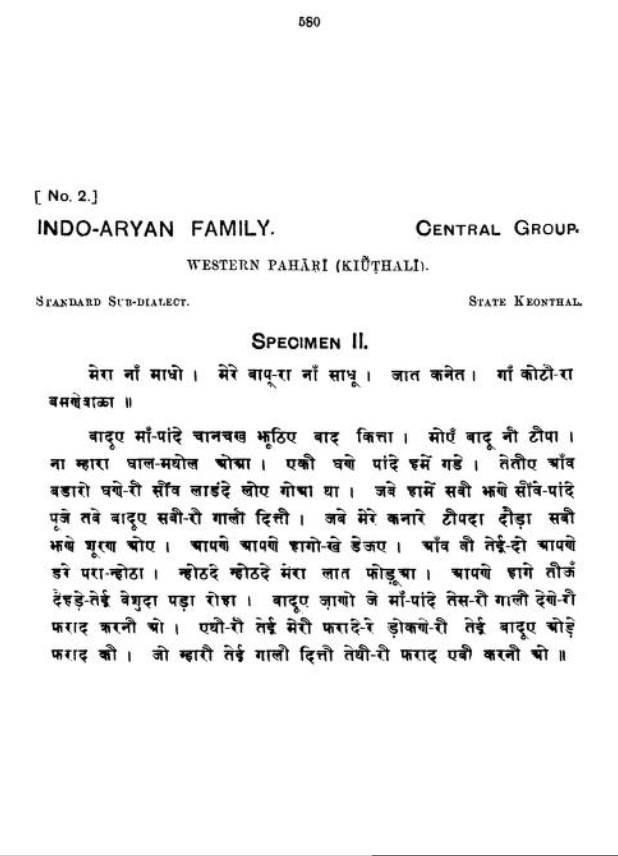
Specimen of Keonthali dialect of Mahasu Pahari

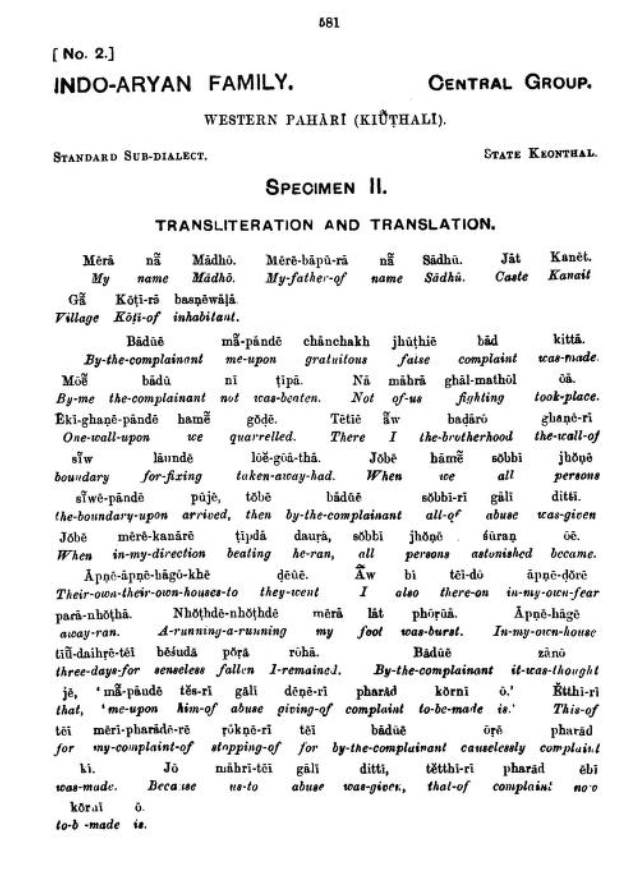
Transliteration and Translation of Specimen of Keonthali

== Phonology ==
Inventory of Phonemes:

There are 42 phonemes of which 37 are consonants and 5 are vowels.

Segmental Phonemes (Vowels)

	Front	Central	Back
Close	i iː		u uː
Mid	e eː		o oː
Open-Mid			
Open		ɑ	

Super segmental Phonemes:

- Length is a phoneme.
- Nasalization is a phoneme.

Consonants:

Place/Manner	Bilabial	Labio-Dental	Dental	Alveolar	Retroflex	Palatal	Velar
Stops unaspirated	p b		t d		ʈ ɖ	t͡ɕ d͡ʑ	k g
Stops aspirated	pʰ bʱ		tʰ dʱ		ʈʰ ɖʱ		kʰ gʱ
Affricates						t͡ɕʰ d͡ʑʱ	
Fricatives		f		s		ɕ	ɦ
Nasals	m			n	ɳ		ŋ
Aspirated Nasals	mʱ			nʱ			
Laterals				l	ɭ		
Aspirated Laterals				lʱ			
Flaps/Trills				r	ɽ		
Semi-Vowel		w				j	

== Grammar ==
Pronouns

The pronouns of Keonthali for different persons and numbers are as follows:

Person	Number	Keonthali	IPA	Meaning
1st	Singular	आऊँ/मा	/aː.ũː/ /maː/ /aː.ɦaː/	I am/Me/I
1st	Plural	हामे	/ɦaː.meː/	We
2nd	Singular	तू	/t̪u/	You
2nd	Plural	तुस्से	/tʊs.seː/	You
3rd	Singular & Plural	से	/seː/	He/She/They

Adverbial Pronouns

		Intorregative	Relative	Distal	Proximate
Time	Keonthali	कदी	जदी	तेबे	ऐबु/ऐबे
Time	Hindi	कब	जब	तब	अब
Time	English	When?	When	Then	Now
Place	Keonthali	केथी/केई	जेथी	तेथी	ऐथी
Place	Hindi	कहाँ	जहाँ	वहाँ	यहाँ
Place	English	Where?	Where	There	Here
Manner	Keonthali	किशे/कियें	जिशे	तिशे	इशे
Manner	Hindi	कैसे	जैसे	वैसे	ऐसे
Manner	English	How	like/as/	like that/in that way	like this
Quantity	Keonthali	किशरा	जिशरा	तिशरा	इशरा
Quantity	Hindi	कितना	जितना	उतना	इतना
Quantity	English	How much/many	as much as/as many as	that much/that many	this much/this many

Verb conjugation

Conjugation of the verb Lekh (लेख) to write, in all three tenses in Keonthali.

Present tense
	Singular	Plural
Keonthali	आऊं लिखूँ	हामे लिखूँ
IPA	/aːũː lɪkʰũː/	/haːmeː lɪkʰũː/
Hindi	मैं लिखता हूँ	हम लिखते हैं
English	I write	We write

Past tense
	Singular	Plural
Keonthali	मा लिखा	हामे लिखा
IPA	/maː lɪkʰaː/	/haːmeː lɪkʰaː/
Hindi	मैंने लिखा	हमने लिखा
English	I wrote	We wrote

Future tense
	Singular	Plural
Keonthali	आऊं लिखमा	हामे लिखमे
IPA	/aːũː lɪkʰmaː/	/haːmeː lɪkʰmeː/
Hindi	मैं लिखूँगा	हम लिखेंगे
English	I will write	We will write

== See also ==
- Keonthal State
- Baghati dialect
- Baghliani dialect
- Hinduri dialect
