= Dhingu Mata Temple =

- ढींगू माता मन्दिर
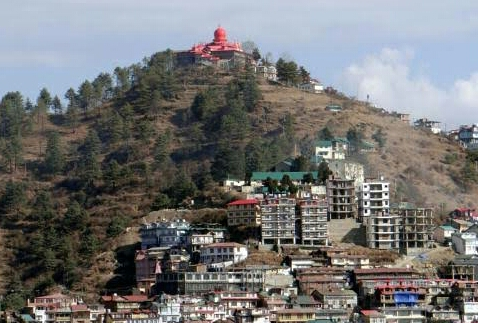
- Dhingu Mata Mandir hilltop view from Sanjauli

- Location of Dhingu Mata Mandir in Himachal Pradesh Dhingu Mata Temple (India)

Religion
- Affiliation: Hinduism
- District: Shimla
- Deity: Durga Mata

Location
- Location: Dhingu Dhar, Sanjauli, Shimla
- State: Himachal Pradesh
- Country: India
- Interactive map of Dhingu Mata Temple
- Coordinates: 31.105531°N 77.200264°E

Architecture
- Creator: Raja Dhingu

Specifications
- Elevation: 2,381 m (7,812 ft)

Dhingu Mata Temple is a temple on top of a hill named Dhingu Dhar above Sanjauli in Shimla city in North Indian state of Himachal Pradesh. The temple is named after its founder, the local ruler Raja Dhingu. The temple is quite popular among locals as well as among tourists.

== History ==
It is believed that Goddess Durga herself appeared in the dreams of Raja Dhingu, a local ruler, expressing her desire to be consecrated in a temple built by him. Honouring her divine wish, the king commissioned the construction of this magnificent temple, which stands as a symbol of his piety and devotion. The temple is believed to be made in 19th century and is older than 100 years.

The Akhand Jyoti has been there for many years, burning constantly for 24 hours everyday. There are ancient three Pindis in the temple among a newly renovated idol renovated in 2021, with an old idol behind it.

== Accessibility ==
The temple is accessible by a narrow link road by which small vehicles can pass, from Sanjauli market up to top of Dhingu Dhar till a municipal parking. The temple is also accessible by stairs, there are 400 stairs up to Dhingu Dhar hill on which the temple is situated, which connects through a link road above Sanjauli. The temple can be seen from many localities of the city. In 2021, the state government made a plan of making an escalator from Sanjauli road to the temple under Smart Cities Mission (Shimla).

== Belief ==
It is believed that every wish of the devotees is fulfilled here. The Bhandara is organised every Sunday in the temple. The Navratri is celebrated with joy in the temple. In Navratri Durgasaptshati Paath is done regularly for all the 9 days. In the temple there are also the idols of Lord Shiva, Lord Rama, Lord Ganesha, Lord Hanuman, etc. The temple opens everyday at 5:00 A.M. and closes at 8:00 P.M.
