= Sanjauli Mosque =

Mosque in Sanjauli, Shimla, Himachal Pradesh

- Location of the mosque in Himachal Pradesh

Religion
- Affiliation: Islam
- Ecclesiastical or organizational status: Mosque
- Ownership: Waqf Board
- Status: Active

Location
- Location: Sanjauli, Shimla, Himachal Pradesh
- Country: India
- Interactive map of Sanjauli Mosque
- Coordinates: 31°06′09″N 77°11′33″E

Architecture
- Established: 1907 (as a community)
- Completed: 1947 (as a building); c. 2007–2018 (expansion)
- Minaret: One (maybe more)

The Sanjauli Mosque is a mosque, located in Sanjauli locality of Shimla, in the North Indian state of Himachal Pradesh, India. It is one of the prominent mosques in the Shimla district.

== History ==
Established in 1907, the mosque built on temple has been modified many times since, especially in since 2007, when multiple storeys were added, without development approval.

=== 2024 controversy ===
During 2024 Hindu groups and local residents raised concerns over the mosque's expansion, claiming that it was illegal and that the land belongs to the Revenue Department, not the Waqf Board. While the Waqf Board acknowledged the original single-floor mosque structure, they were uncertain about the legality of the four floors that were added by 2018, without approval. On 30 August 2024, a group linked to the mosque allegedly attacked local traders, which intensified tensions in relation to the mosque's development. Media reports claimed that there was an incident where a Hindu man was allegedly assaulted by six individuals who reportedly sought refuge in the mosque. The alleged assault sparked protests by Hindu right-wing organizations, who argued that the mosque is being used to harbour "outsiders," raising communal tensions. It was also alleged that the complaints were driven by Islamophobia and anti-minority sentiment. The situation garnered political attention, with some local leaders advocating for the mosque's demolition, while the state government emphasized equal rights for all citizens and vowed to maintain peace. In September, it was reported that the matter had been ongoing for 14 years and that 45 hearings had been held since 2020. In order to quell the dispute, the Waqf Board requested the Municipal Court to not order the demolition of the mosque while they sought approval for the construction from the local Council. However, on 5 October, the Municipal Court ordered the demolition of illegal three floors. The mosque committee voluntarily offered to carry out the demolition of three floors; and a two-month timeframe was given for completion of the demolition works. In November, an appeal by the Waqf Board against the order of the Municipal Court was dismissed by the Shimla District Court.

== Architecture ==
The mosque exhibits a traditional Islamic architectural style, with a clean and modest design. It typically has features like arches and a minaret, common in many Indian mosques. Given its location in a hilly area, the structure blends harmoniously with the local landscape.

== See also ==
- Islam in India
- List of mosques in India

== Additional reading ==
- Jamil, Ghazala (2017). Accumulation by Segregation: Muslim Localities in Delhi. New Delhi: Oxford University Press. p. 240. ISBN 9780199470655.
