= Mashobra =

- town
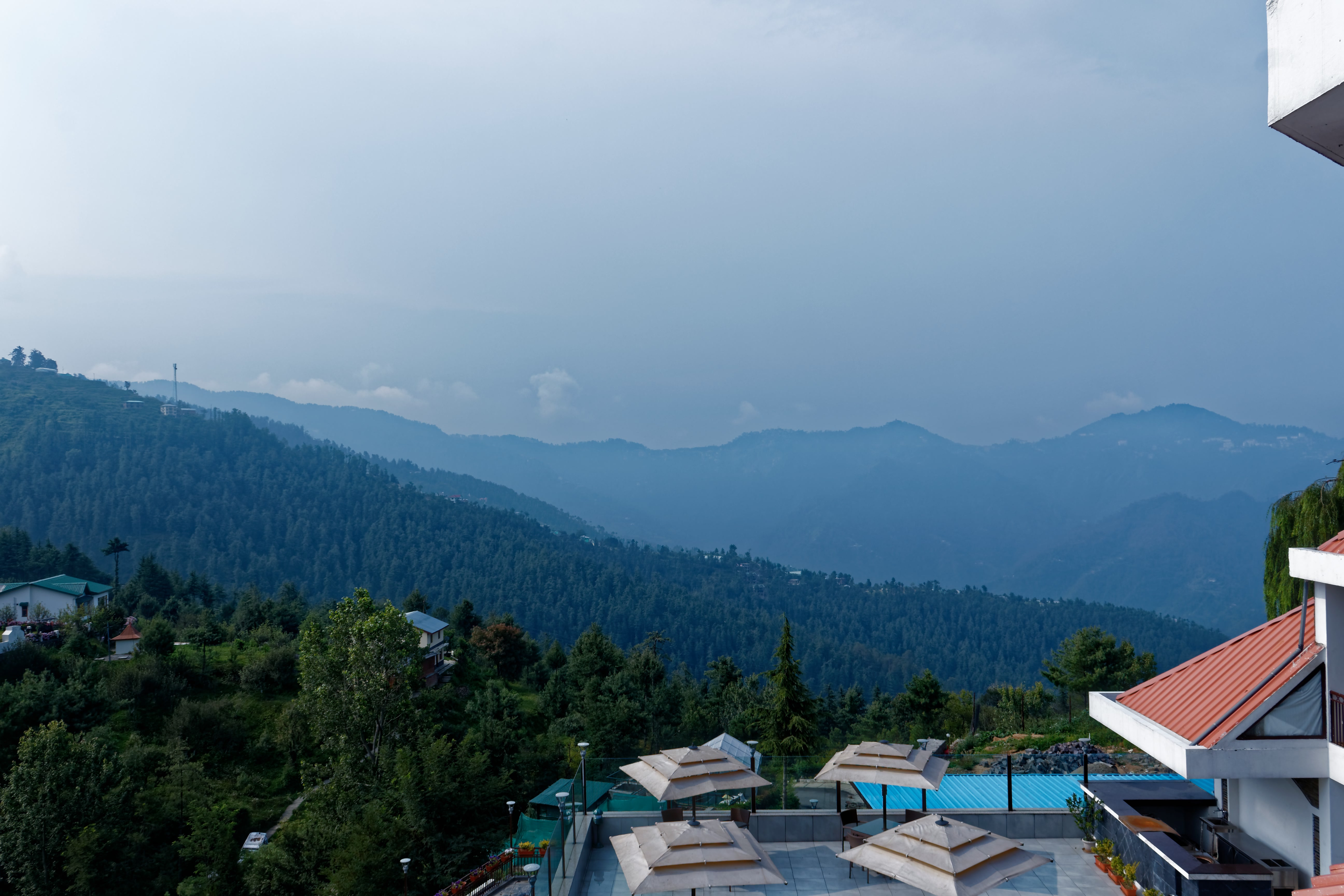
- Mashobra skyline

- Location in Himachal Pradesh, India Mashobra (India)
- Coordinates: 31.13°N 77.23°E
- Country: India
- State: Himachal Pradesh
- District: Shimla
- Elevation: 2,146 m (7,041 ft)

Languages
  - Official: Hindi
  - Regional: Mahasu Pahari (Keonthali)
- Time zone: UTC+5:30 (IST)
- PIN: 171 007
- Telephone code: 0177
- Vehicle registration: HP HP-03, HP-51

Mashobra is a town in Shimla district of Himachal Pradesh. It is connected to the state capital Shimla (erstwhile Simla) through the historic Hindustan–Tibet Road built in 1850 by Lord Dalhousie.

== Geography ==
Mashobra is located at 31.13°N 77.23°E. It has an average elevation of 2,146 metres (7,041 feet).

== History ==
During the colonial period, Mashobra was a part of the princely state of Koti. Towards the end of the 19th century, Mashobra developed into a popular weekend resort for the elite residents of Shimla, the summer capital of the British Raj.

== Retreat ==
Mashobra is notable for housing one of the two Presidential retreats in India. The other retreat is Rashtrapati Nilayam in Secunderabad.

The president visits Mashobra at least once every year, and during this time their office shifts to the retreat at Chharabra, in the vicinity of Mashobra. The building housing the retreat is a completely wooden structure originally constructed in 1850.

In May 1948, before returning to London at the end of his mission as viceroy and then governor general of India, Lord Mountbatten and his wife Lady Edwina spent a few weeks in this retreat. The then Prime Minister Jawaharlal Nehru paid them a visit, which is documented in the biographies of Lady Mountbatten.

== Places of interest ==
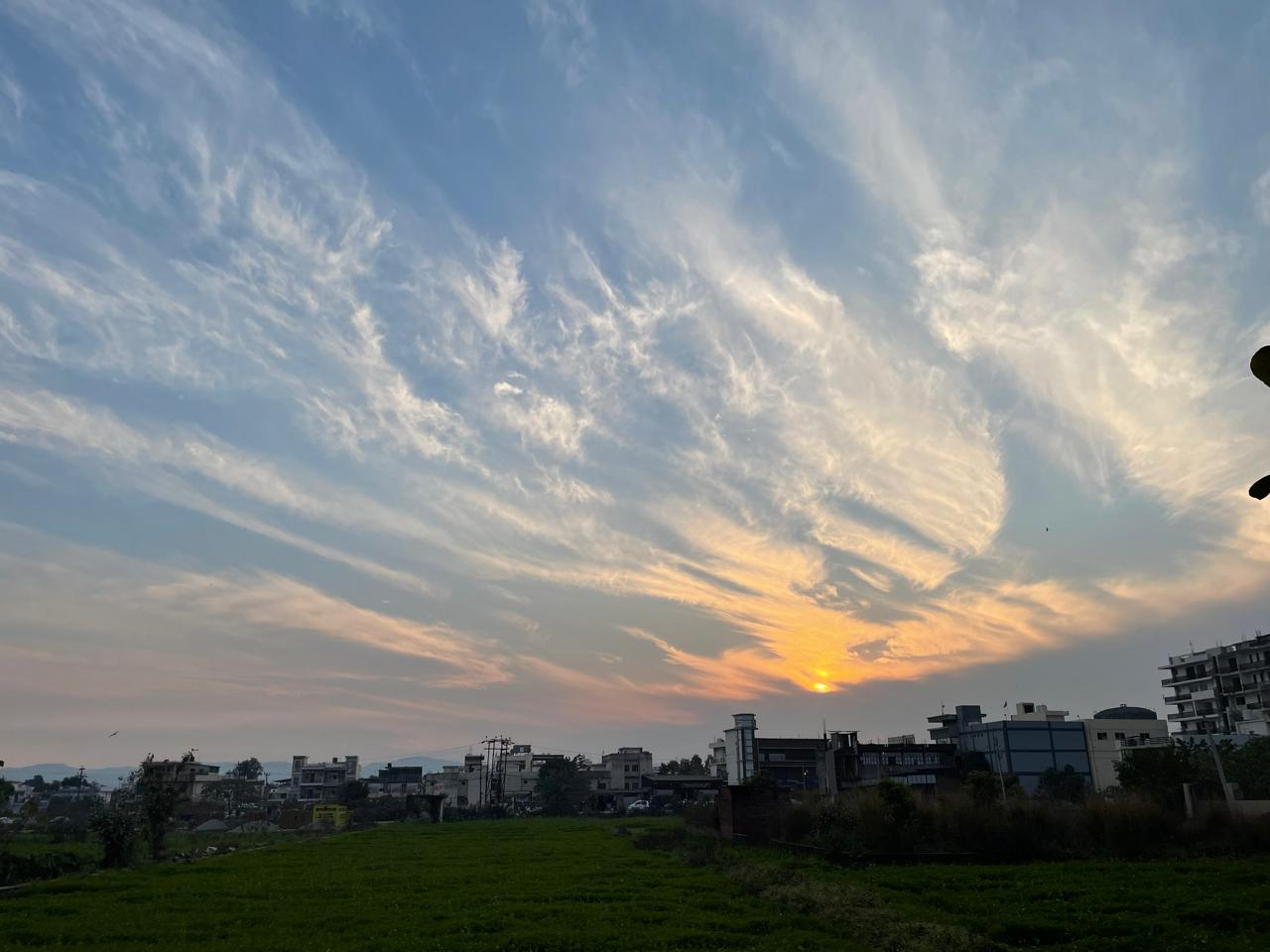

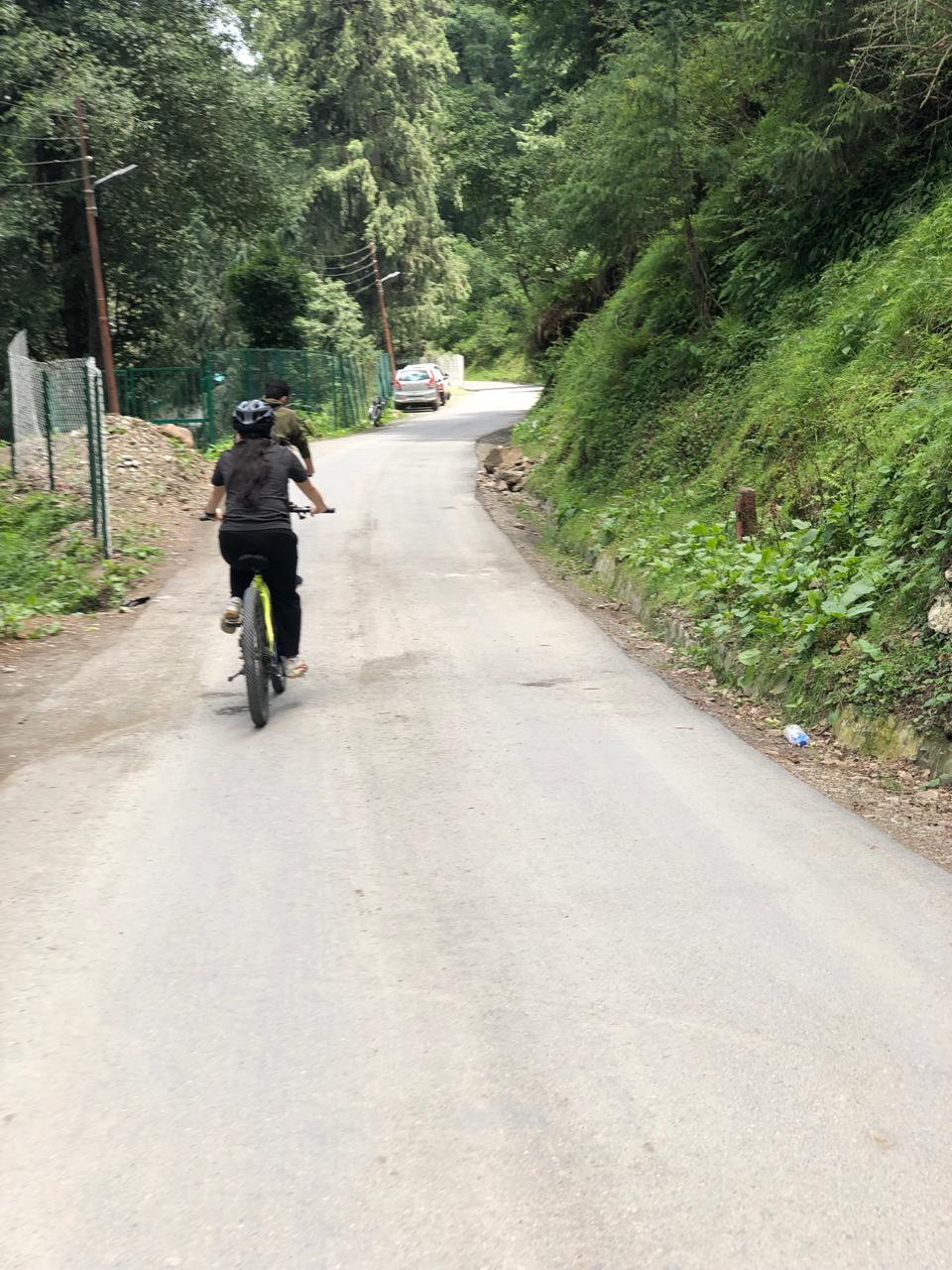
Cycling Trail in Mashobra

Mashobra is also a serene tourist destination with much less commercialization and large-scale tourist infrastructure when compared to the main city of Shimla and nearby counterparts such as Manali.

Wildflower Hall at Chharabra, now a property of Oberoi Hotels, has been residence to Lord Kitchener as well as Lord Ripon during the British Raj.

At 3 km from Mashobra is Carignano, a picnic spot that was a villa of Chevalier Federico Peliti, an Italian photographer in India from the times of Queen Victoria, who named it in honor of his native town Carignano near Turin in Italy. The villa was transformed to a weekend resort in 1920 and is also referred to in one of the novels by Anita Desai.

== Notable people ==
- Pankaj Mishra is a writer/poet who lives in Mashobra.
- Amit Khanna, film maker, poet, writer and media guru has a cottage in Mashobra where he spends several weeks every year working on his new book.
- Like Amit, Navtej Sarna, well known diplomat and author, is also a part time resident of Puranikoti village near Mashobra.

== Flora and fauna ==
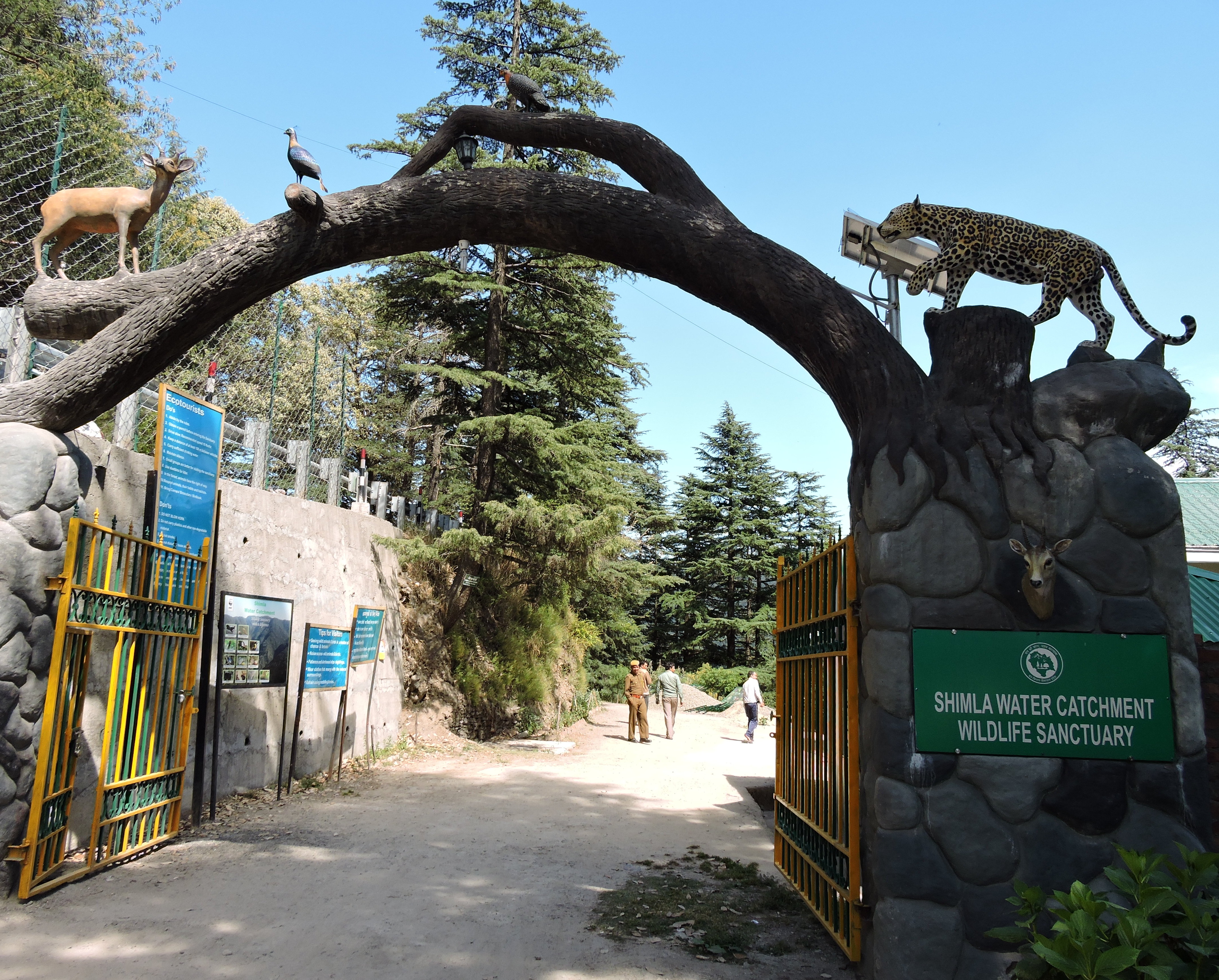
Entrance, Shimla Water Catchment Wildlife Sanctuary, Himachal Pradesh, India

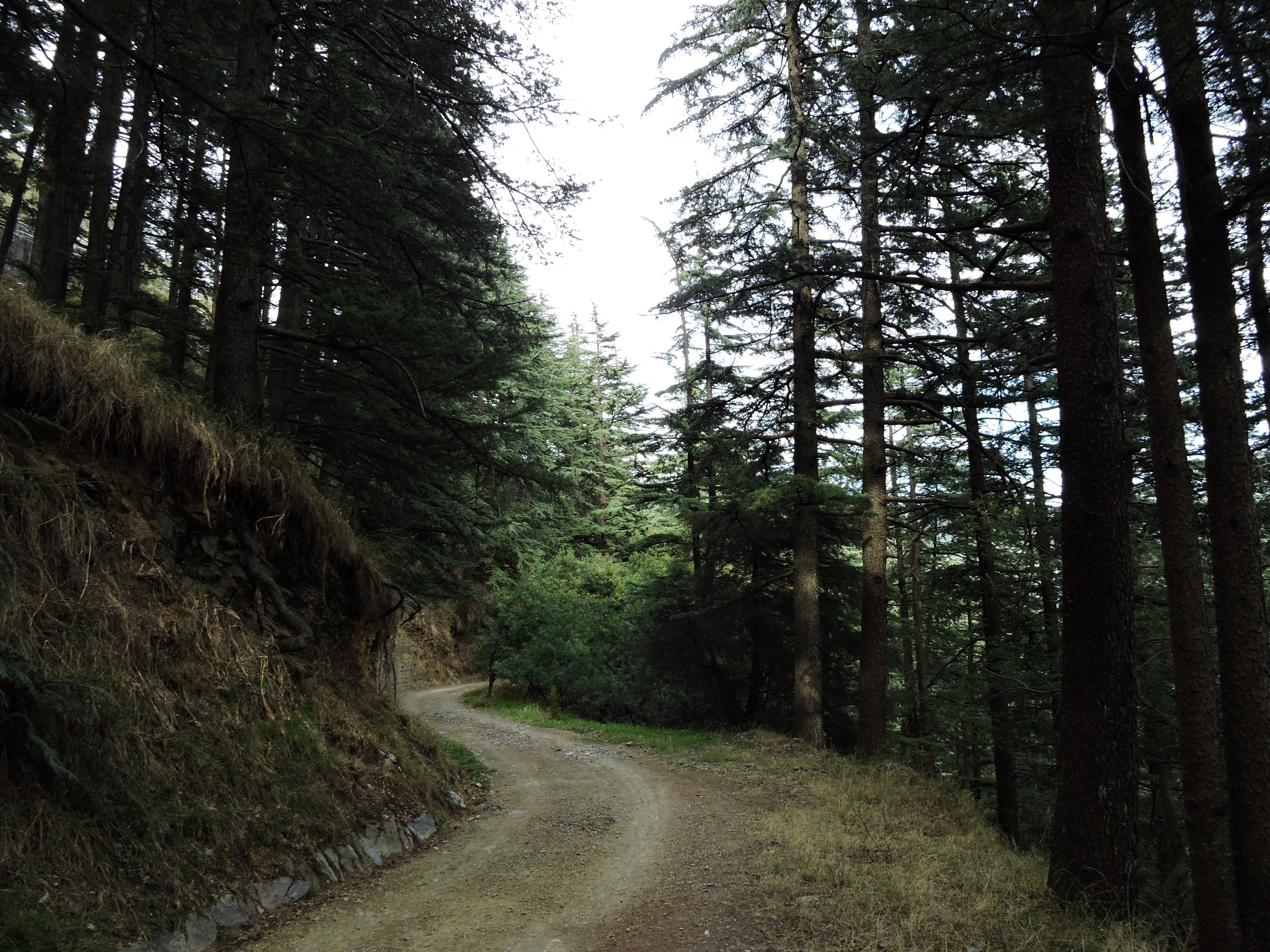
Inner view of Shimla Water Catchment Wildlife Sanctuary, Himachal Pradesh, India

Mashobra is part of Shimla Water Catchment and Wildlife Sanctuary. The natural vegetation comprises pine, oak, cedar or Himalayan deodar, and rhododendron, as well as maple and horse chestnut. The wildlife consists of monkeys, Langurs, jackals, kakkar (barking deer), and the occasional leopard, as well as numerous bird species such as the Himalayan eagle, pheasants, chikor and partridges.

== Education ==
Himalayan International School at Chharabra is a major residential school in Mashobra.
