= Keonthal =

Princely state of India

Coordinates: 31°02′N 77°18′E

Keonthal State क्योंथल रियासत
- Princely State of British India
- Late 18th century–1948
- Capital: Junga
- Area
  - 1931: 482 km^{2} (186 sq mi)
- Population
  - 1931: 25,560
- History
  - Established: Late 18th century
  - Independence of India: 1948
Succeeded by
India

Keonthal State, covering an area of 482 km^{2}, was one of the Princely states of India during the period of the British Raj. Its capital was Junga. Keonthal acceded to India on 15 April 1948. Currently, it is part of the Indian state of Himachal Pradesh.

== History ==
According to tradition there was a predecessor state founded around 765 AD. The state of Keonthal was founded before the 19th century. It was ruled by Rana Raghunath Sen until its occupation by Nepal under General Amar Singh Thapa from 1803 to 1814. After the occupation, Sansar Sen ruled as the Rana from 1814 until 24 July 1858 when he took the title of Raja.

After the Gurkha War in 1815, a portion of Keonthal, which had been occupied by the Gurkhas, was sold to the maharaja of Patiala, the remainder being restored to its hereditary chief.

Keonthal's first capital was Koti, 9 kilometres from the hill station of Chail after which the capital was shifted to Junga. The native language of the state was Keonthali dialect of Mahasu Pahari.

=== Rulers ===
The heads of the state bore the title 'Rana' until 1858.

==== Ranas ====
- .... – .... Bhup Sen
- 1801–1803 Raghunath Sen (1st time) (d. 1831)
- 1803–1814 occupied by Nepal
- 1814–1831 Raghunath Sen (2nd time) (s.a.)
- 1831 – 24 July 1858 Sansar Sen (died 1862)

==== Rajas ====
- 24 July 1858 – 1862 Sansar Sen
- 1862–1882 Mahendra Sen
- 1882–1901 Balbir Sen
- 1901–1916 Bije Sen
- 2 February 1916 – 15 August 1947 Hemendra Sen (born 1905)
