= Kufri, India =

Kufri District 131 Himadri
- Hill Station
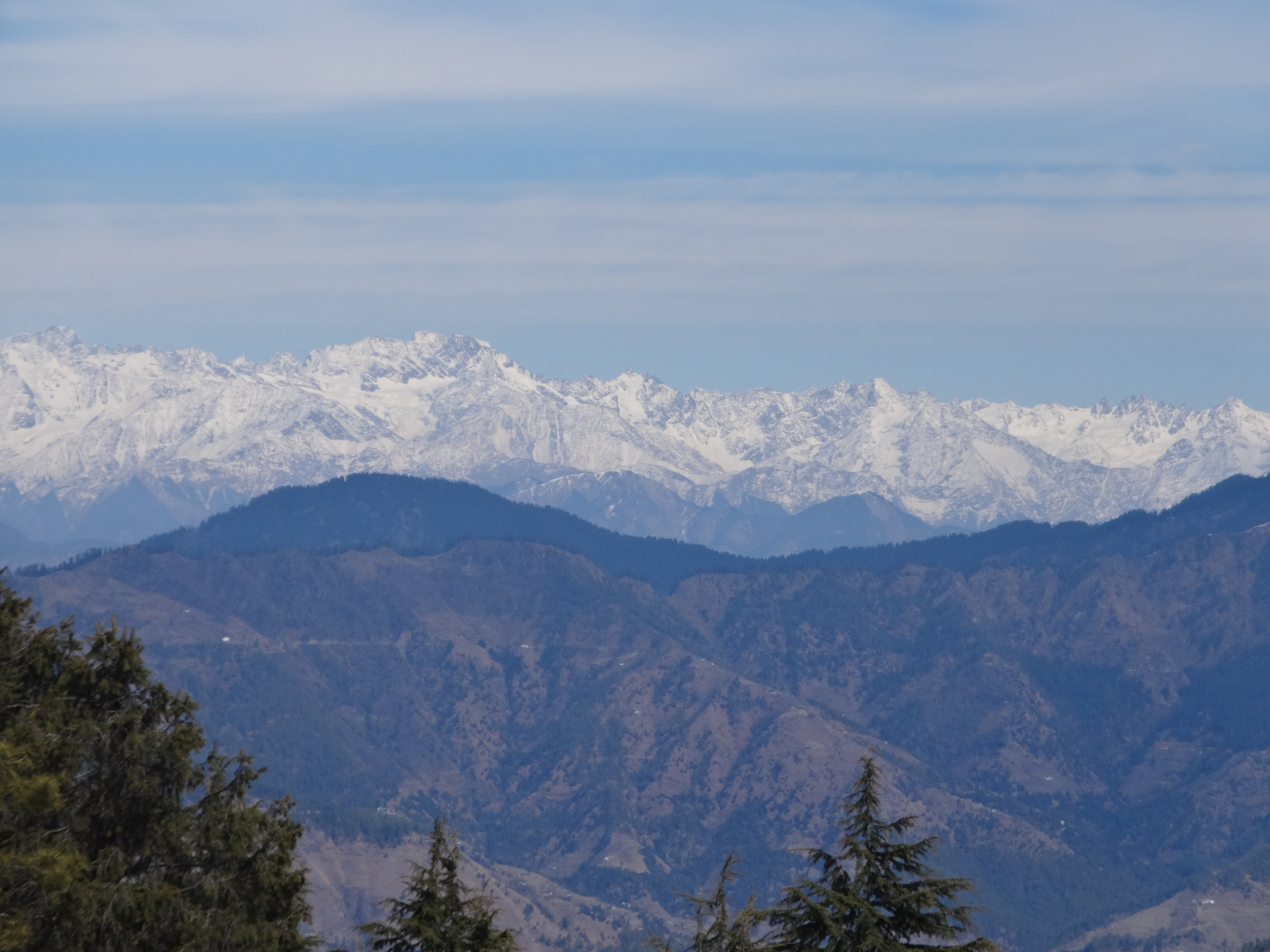
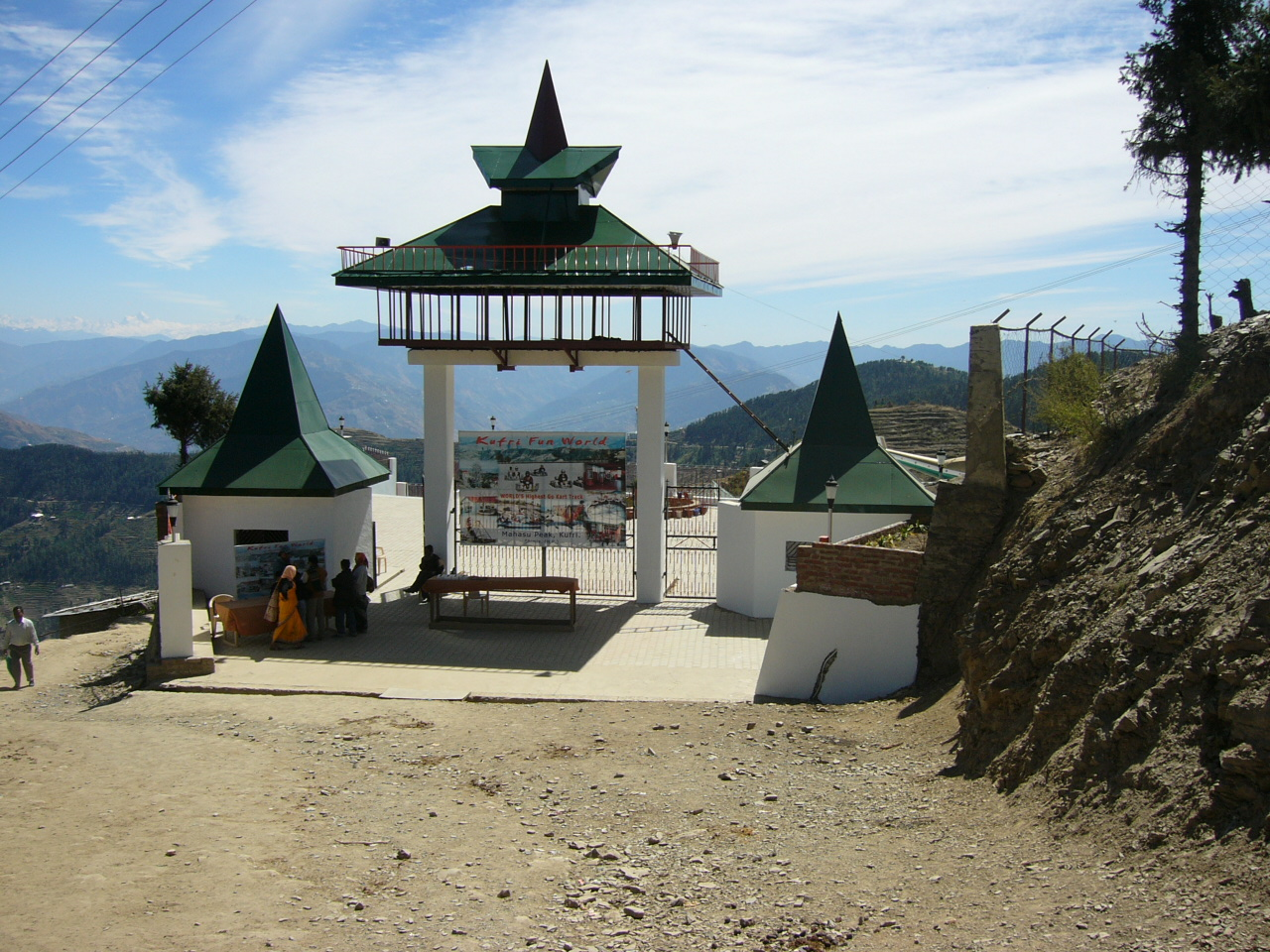
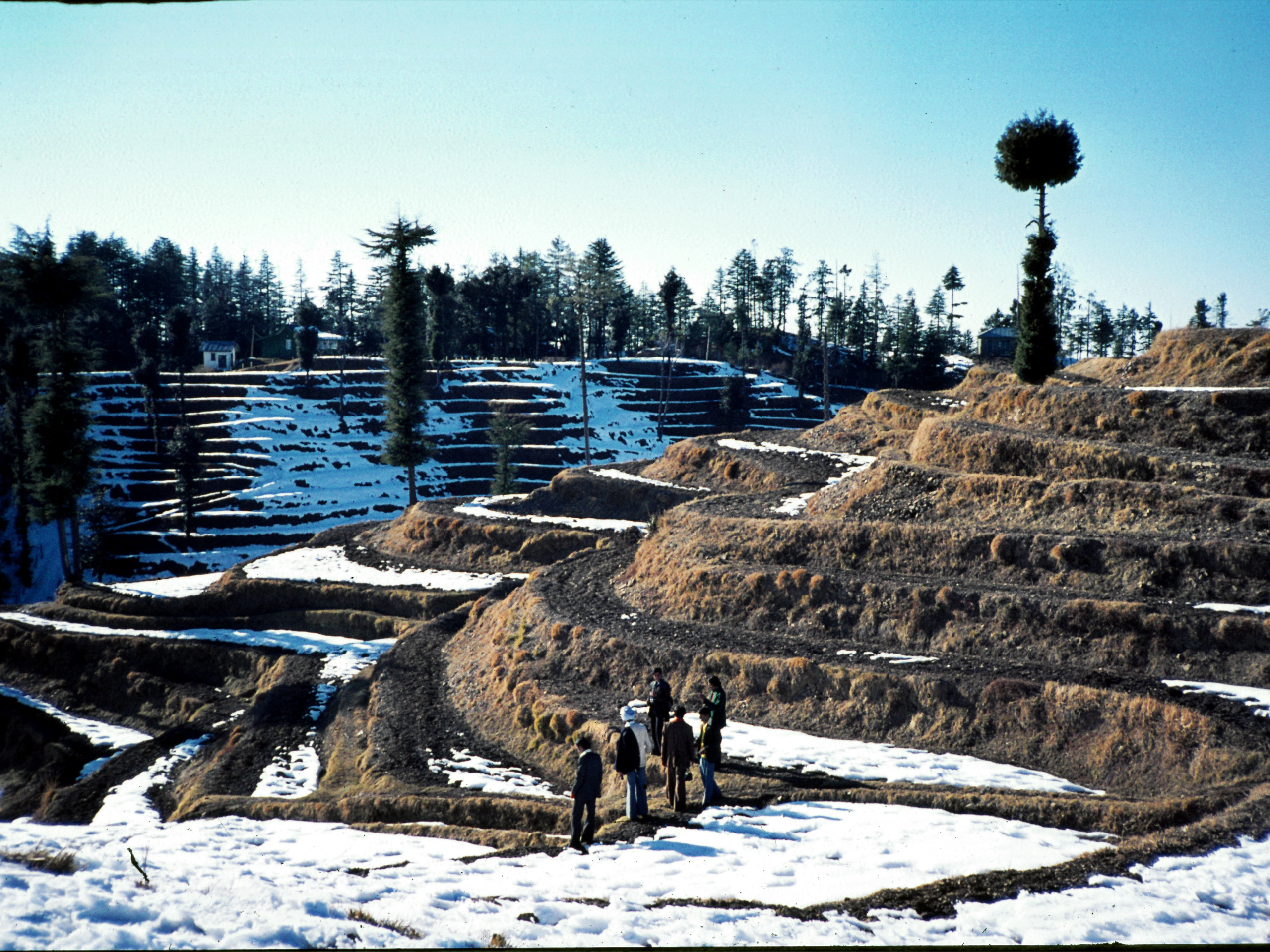
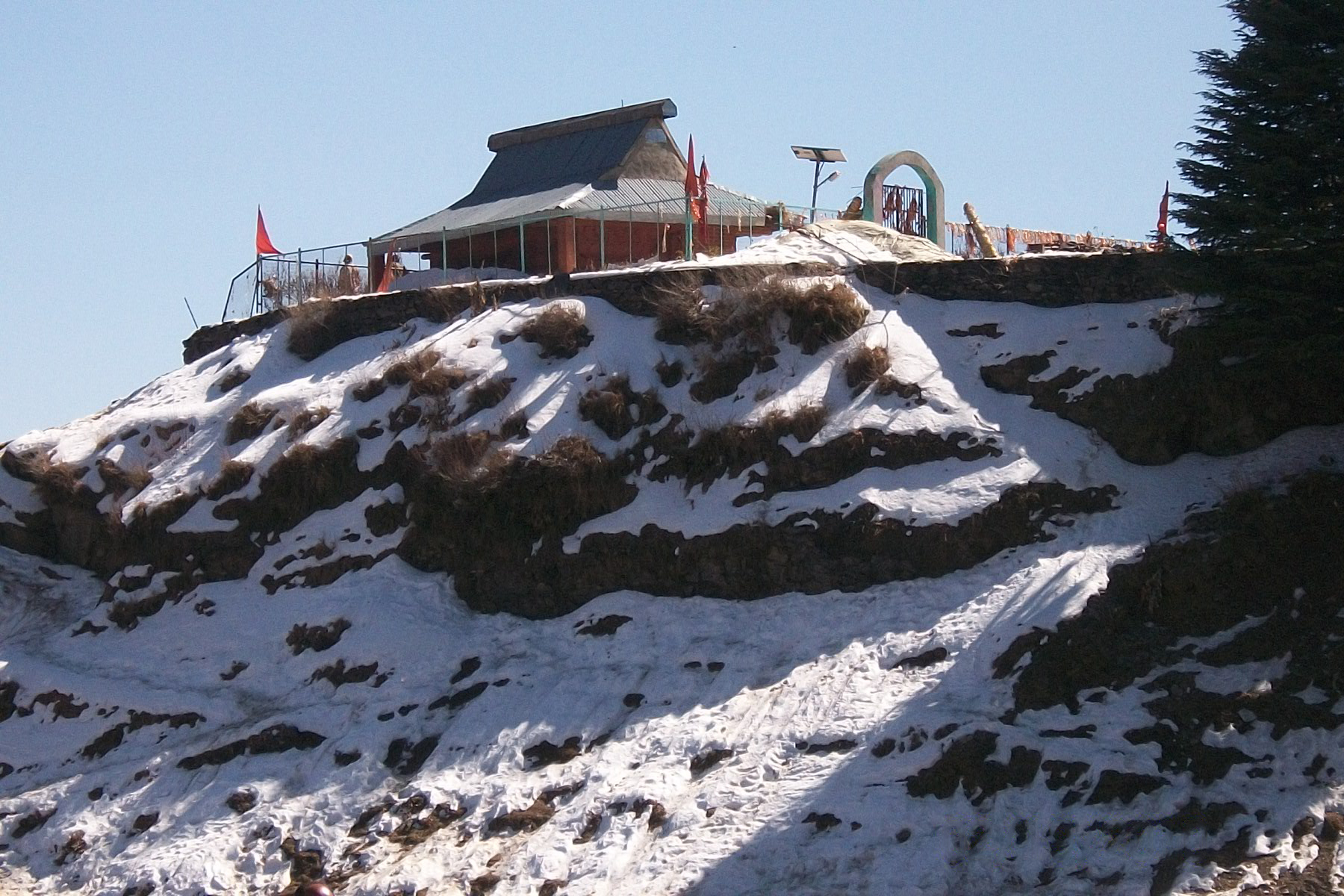
- From top, left to right: Views of distant mountains from Kufri; Kufri Fun World; Snow covered meadows on Mahasu peak; Mahasu Naag Temple atop of Mahasu peak
- Nickname: Snow Queen
- Location in Himachal Pradesh Location in India
- Coordinates: 31.0979°N 77.2678°E
- Country: India
- State: Himachal Pradesh
- District: Shimla
- Elevation: 2,289.048 m (7,510.00 ft)

Population (2001)
  - Total: 1,148

Languages
  - Official: Hindi
  - Regional: Mahasu Pahari (Keonthali)
- Time zone: UTC+5:30 (IST)

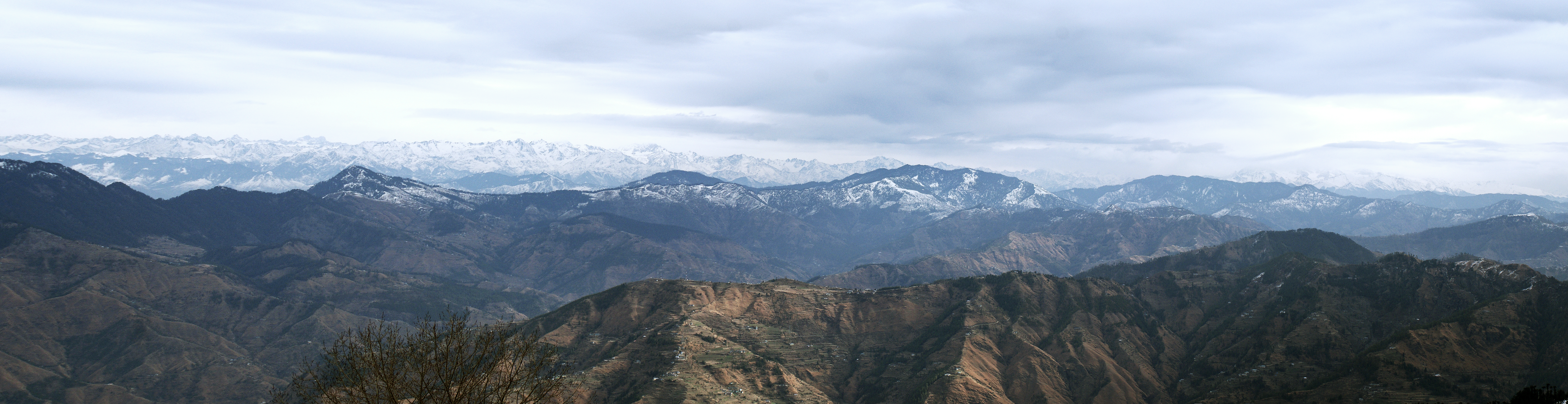
Views of distant Himalayan mountains from Kufri

Kufri is a resort hill station in the district of Shimla, India. It is located 12 km (7.5 mi) from the state capital Shimla on the National Highway 5 (also known as Hindustan-Tibet road). On the Kufri Avenue, the main thoroughfare, boutiques and restaurants mix with Indian-style hotels and souvenir shops are to look for during a visit.

The name Kufri is derived from the word kufr meaning "lake" in the local language. The highest point in the surrounding region, Kufri has a Himalayan wildlife zoo which hosts rare antelopes, felines and birds including the Himalayan monal, the state bird of Himachal Pradesh until 2007. During winter, a meandering path through the potato plantations turns into a popular ski track.

== Geography ==
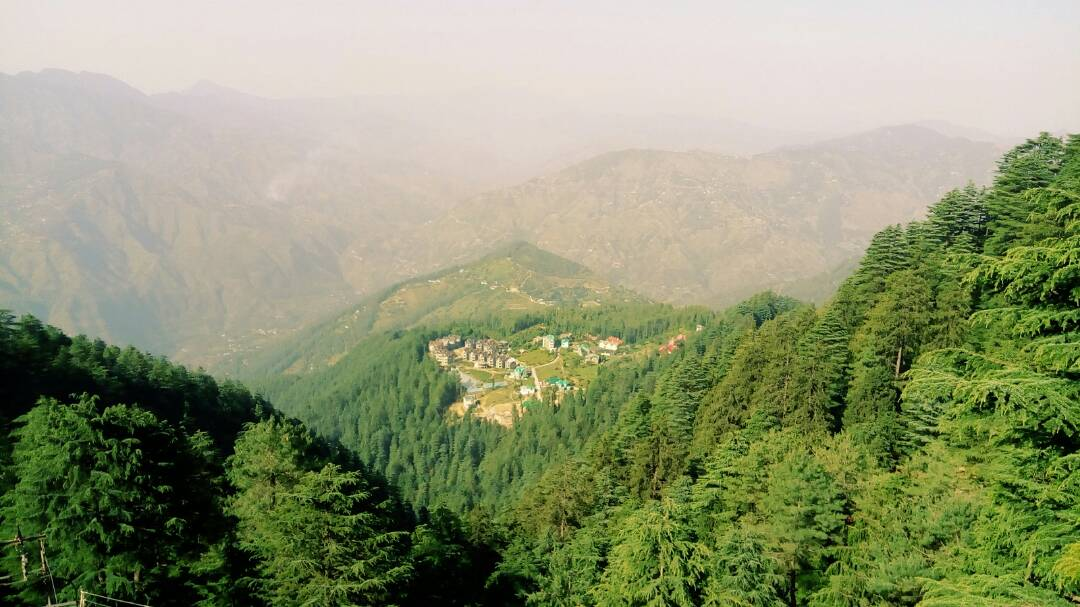
Views from Kufri

Kufri is located at 31.10°N 77.25°E. It has an average elevation of 2,720 metres (8923 feet).

== History ==
The region around Shimla including Kufri was once a part of the Kingdom of Nepal until the area was ceded to the British Raj as part of the Sugauli Treaty. This region remained obscure from the rest of the world until the British 'discovered' it in 1819.

== Places of interest ==
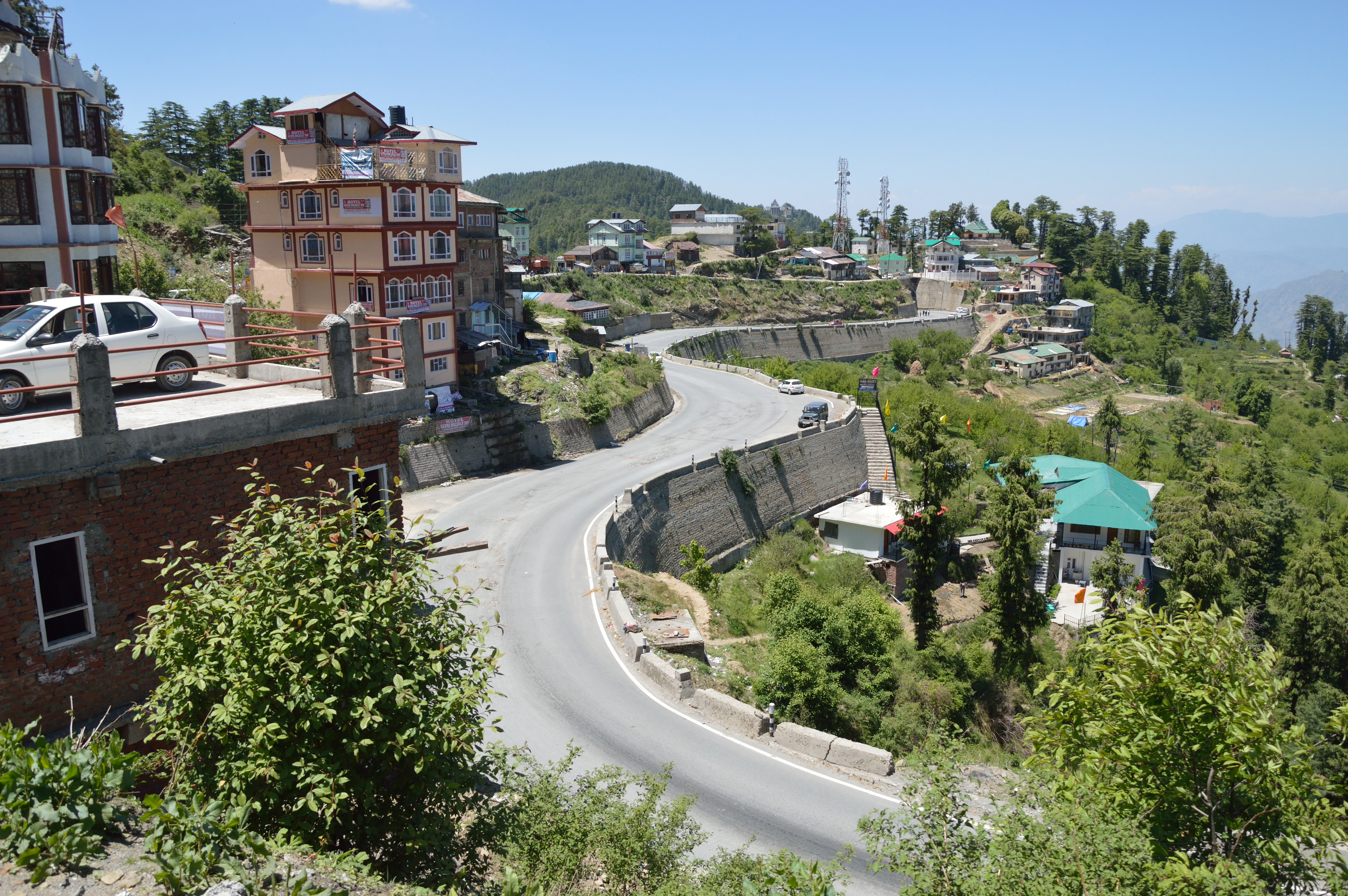
Kufri with NH-5, Shimla

Kufri Fun Campus an amusement park to enjoy the whole day. This park is equipped with various rides, pools and world's highest go-kart track.

Kufri to the Mahasu Peak- the highest peak in Kufri.

=== Indira Tourist Park ===
The Indira Tourist Park is near the Himalayan Nature Park and provides panoramic view of the locations around.

=== Chini Bungalow ===
It is the Kufri bungalow which is very famous for its statues and architecture.

== Gallery ==
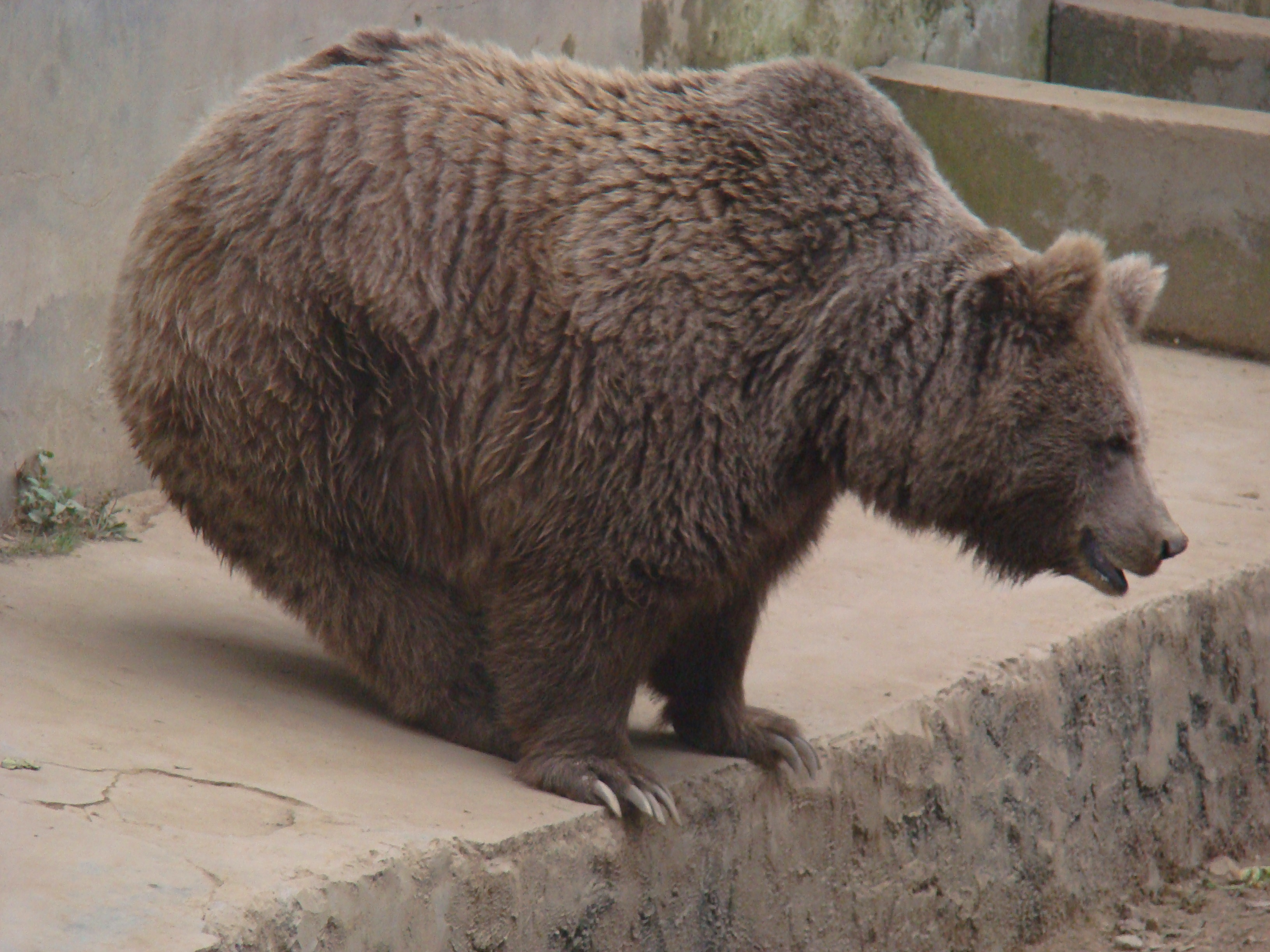
Bear in the Kufri zoo

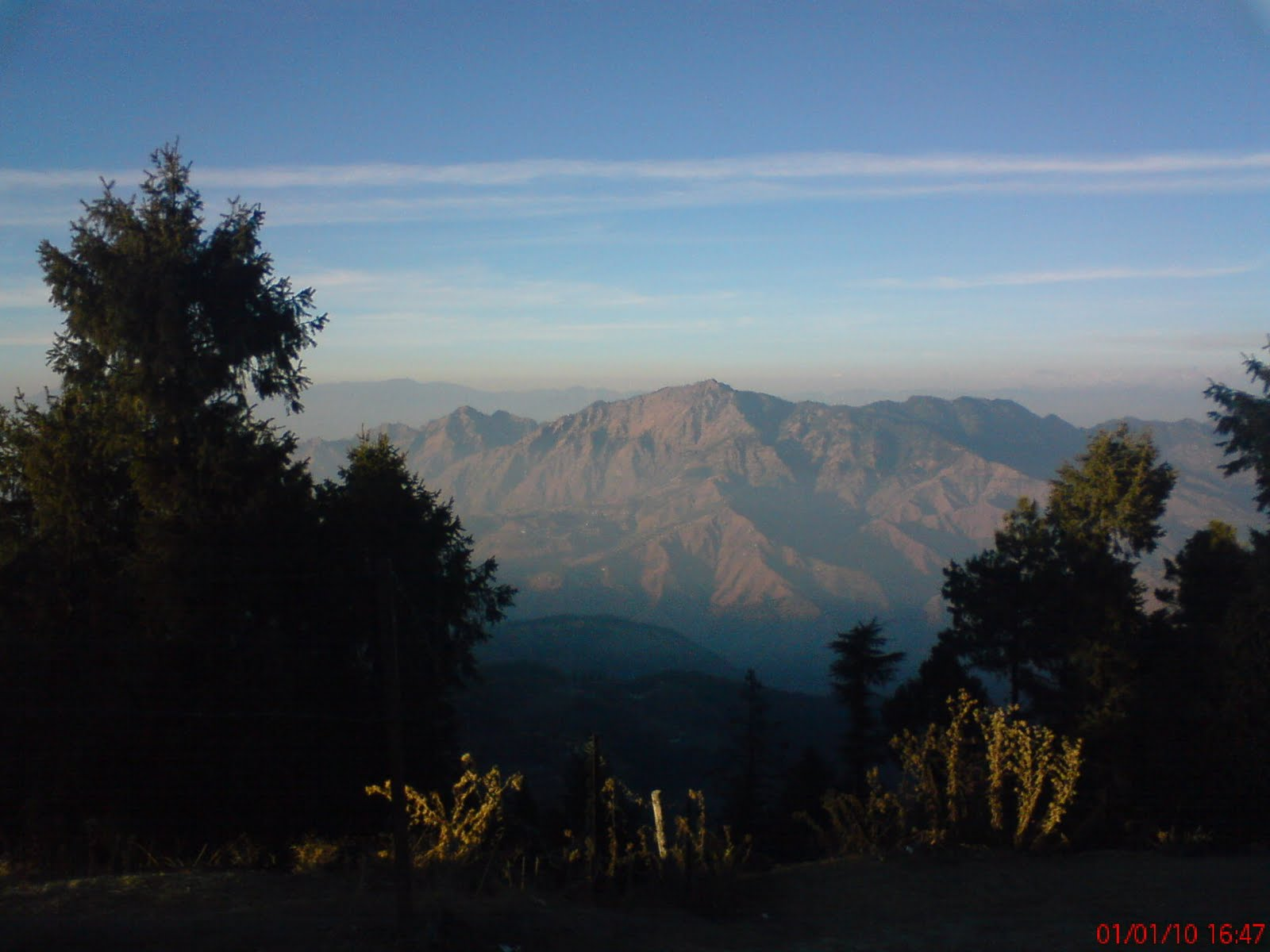
Himalayas from Kufri

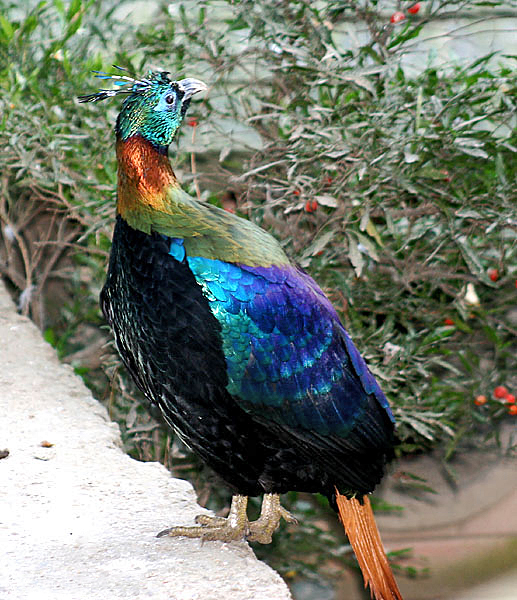
Male monal

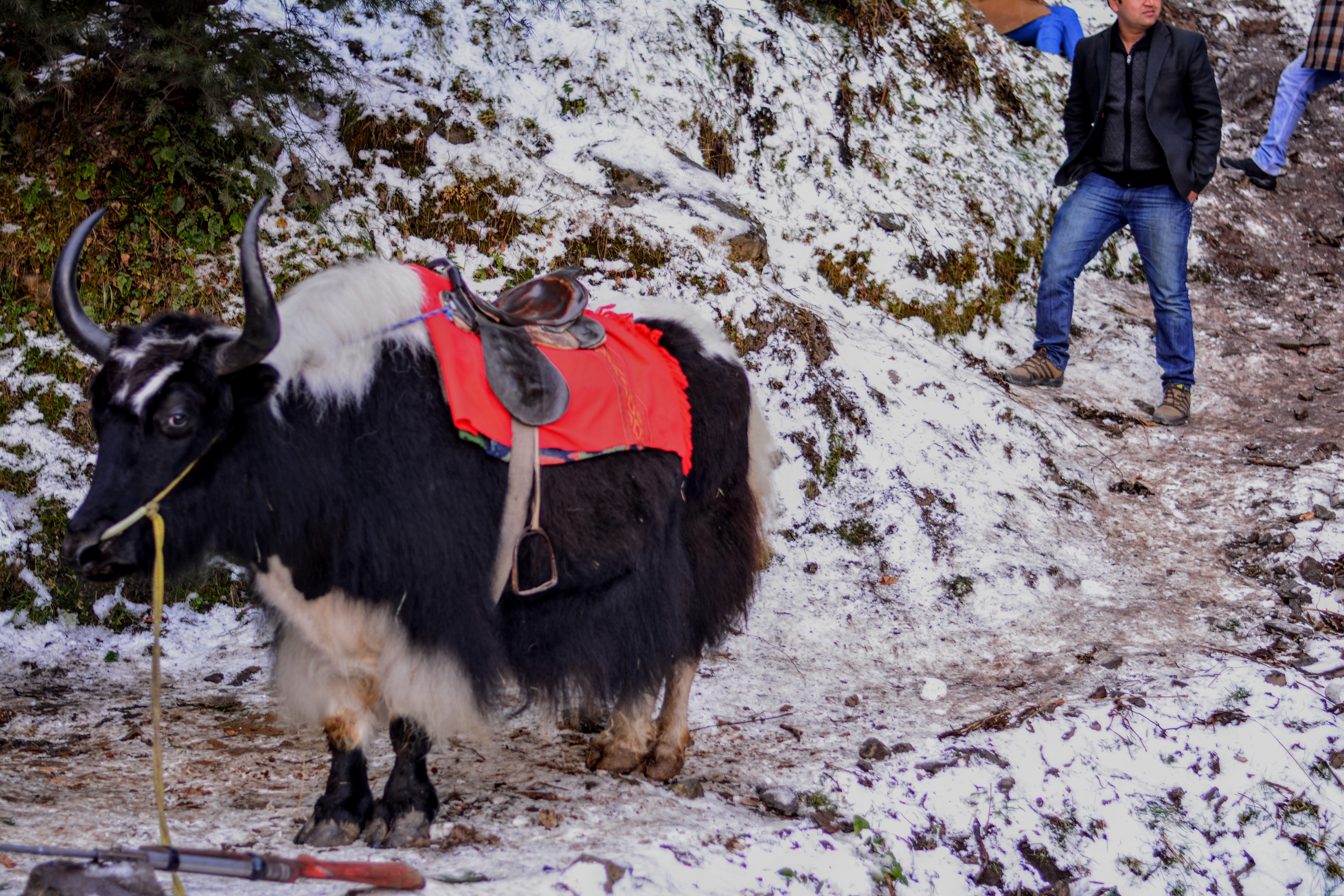
Kufri Yak
