= Solan =

Solan Mushroom City City of Red Gold
- City
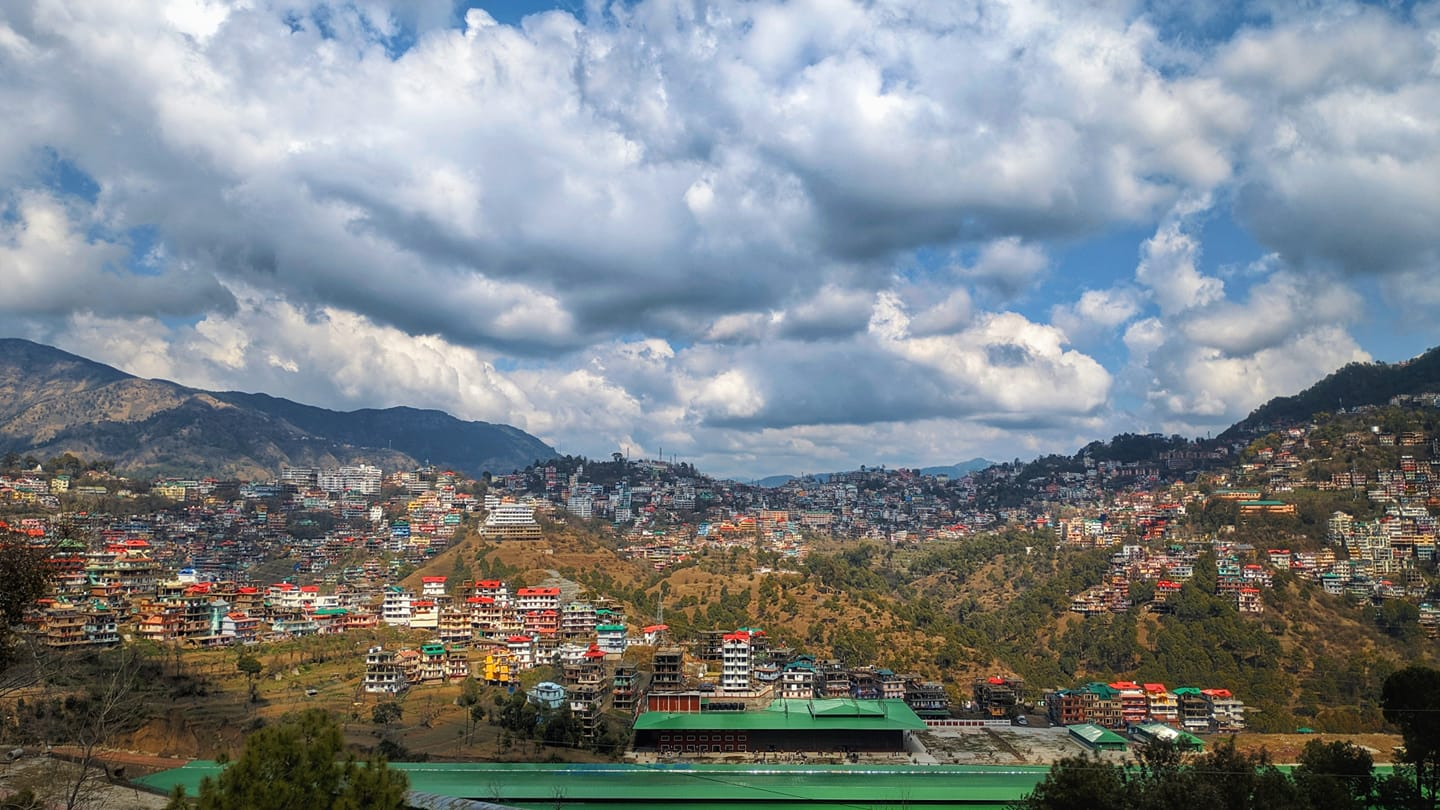
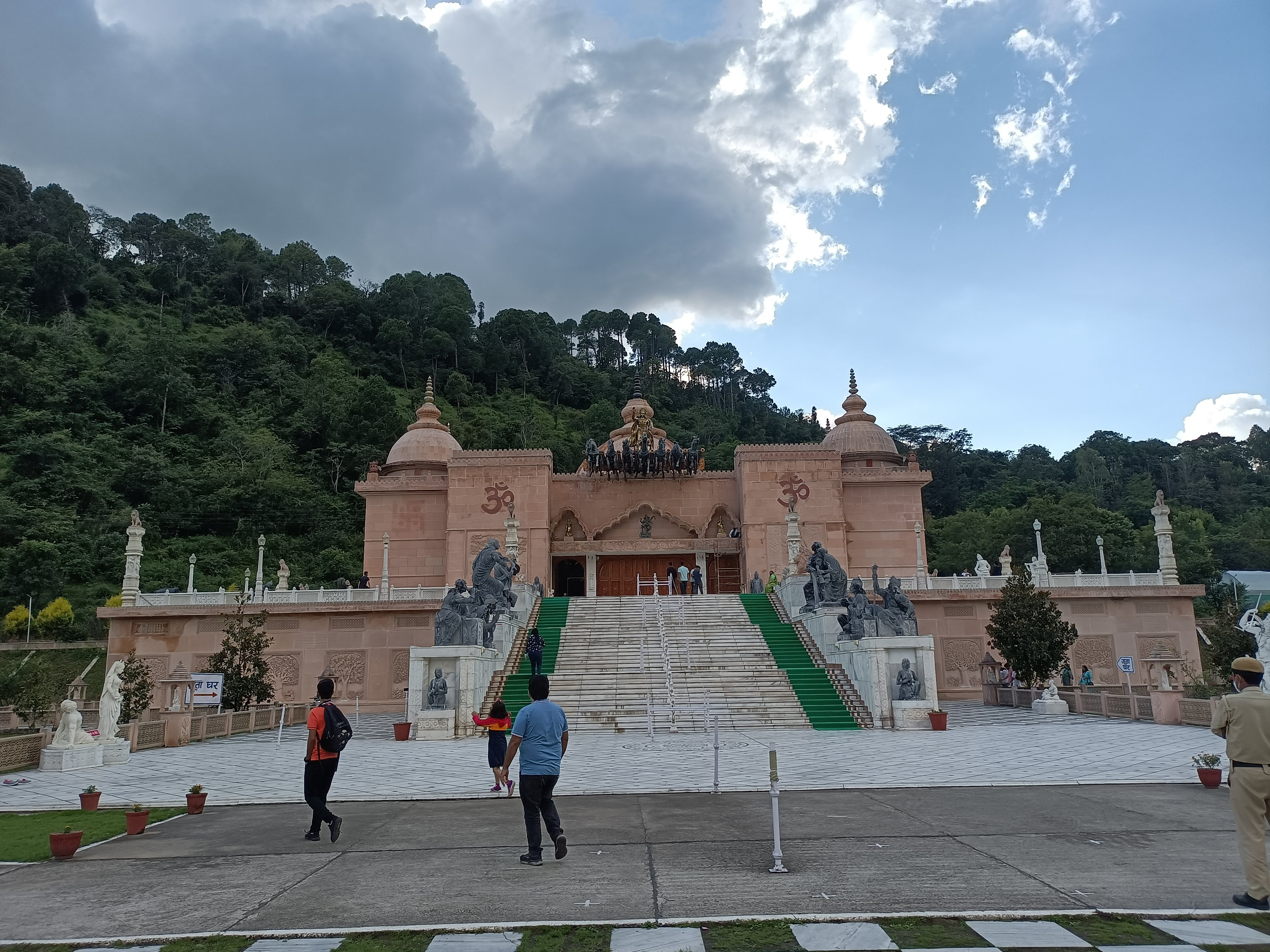
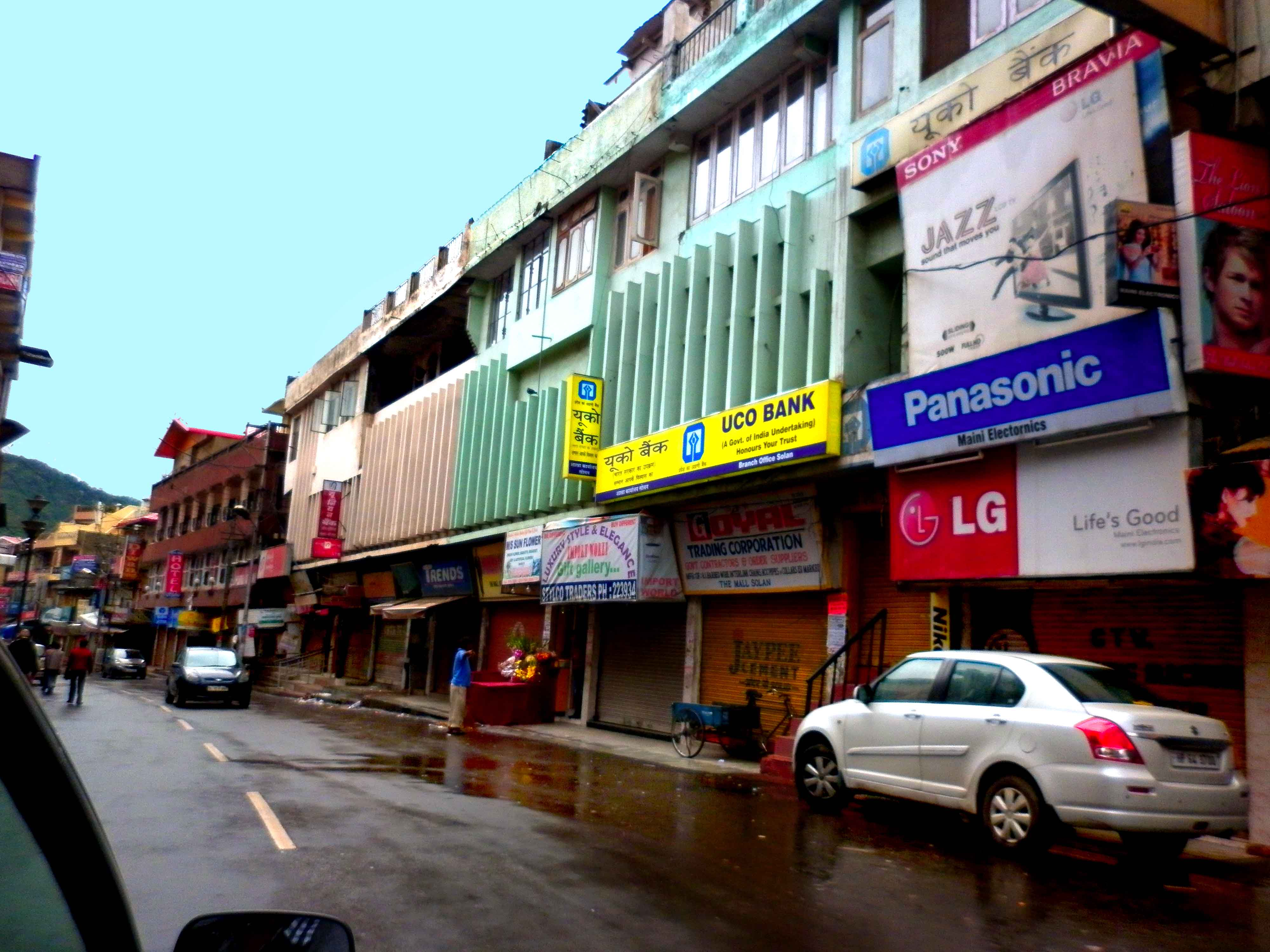
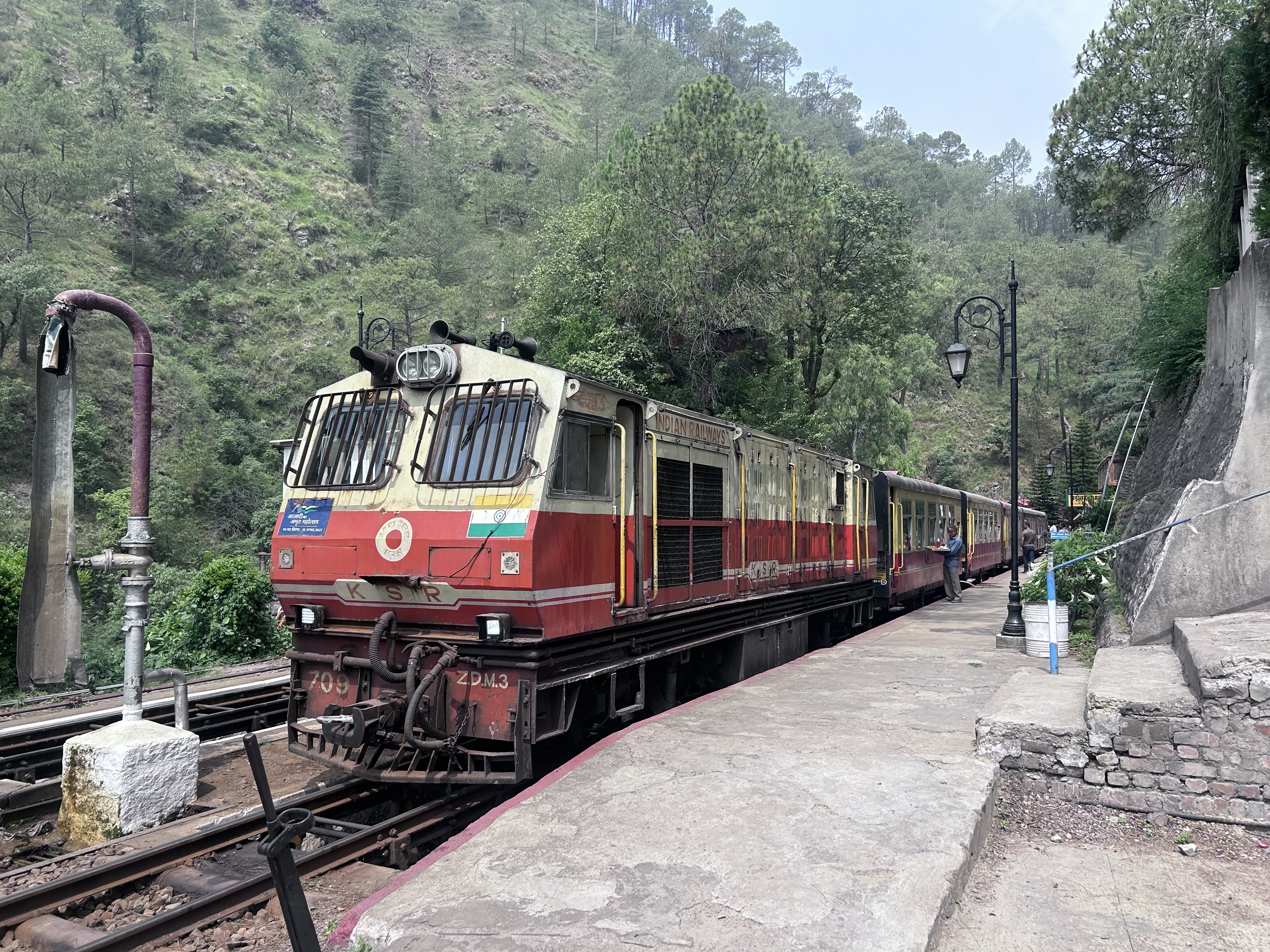
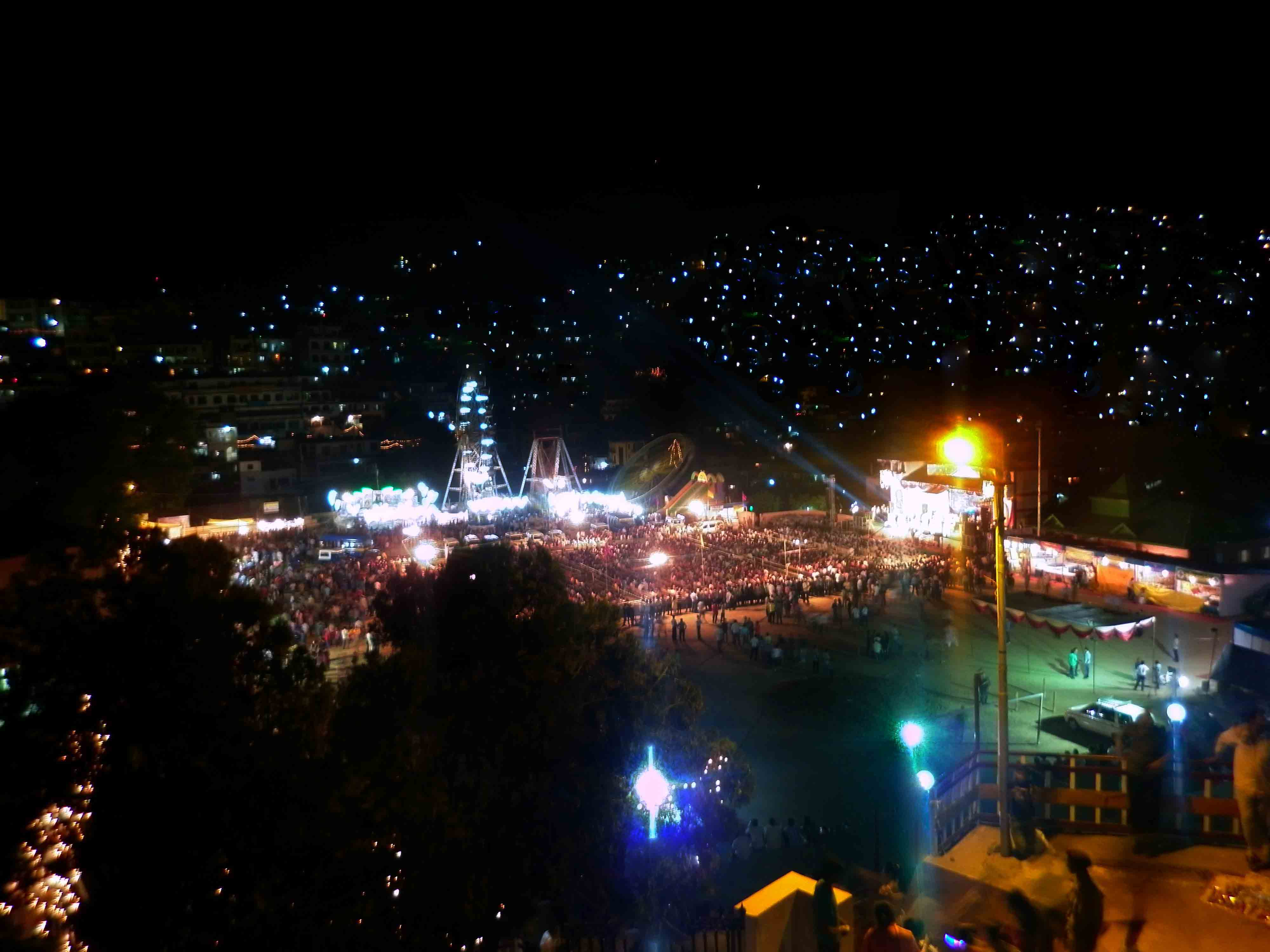
- From top, left to right: Panoramic view of Solan city, Mohan Shakti National Heritage Park, Mall Road Solan, Solan railway station, Shoolini Devi Mandir, Shoolini Mahotsav in Thodo ground
- Nickname(s): Mushroom City of India, City of Red Gold
- Location within Himachal Pradesh Location within India
- Coordinates: 30.907985°N 77.098403°E
- Country: India
- State: Himachal Pradesh
- District: Solan

Government
  - Body: Solan Municipal Corporation

Area
  - Total: 33.43 km^{2} (12.91 sq mi)
- Elevation: 1,550 m (5,090 ft)

Population (2020)
  - Total: 47,418
  - Rank: 3 in HP

Languages
  - Official: Hindi
  - Native: Mahasui (Baghati)
- Time zone: UTC+5:30 (IST)
- PIN: 173212
- Telephone code: 01792
- Vehicle registration: HP-13, HP-14, HP-15, HP-59, HP-64
- Avg. annual temperature: 15 °C (59 °F)
- Avg. summer temperature: 30 °C (86 °F)
- Avg. winter temperature: 0 °C (32 °F)
- Climate: Cwa
- Website: hpsolan.gov.in

Solan is a city in the Indian state of Himachal Pradesh and the district headquarters of Solan district. It is located 45.5 kilometres (28 mi) south of the state capital, Shimla. Solan has an average elevation of 1,550 metres (5,090 ft). The city is situated between Chandigarh and Shimla on the Kalka-Shimla National Highway-5. The narrow-gauge Kalka-Shimla railway passes through Solan. Located near the Punjab-Haryana-Himachal border, Solan is nestled in the Shivalik Hills of the Himalayas.

Solan was originally the capital of the princely state, Baghat. A defining feature of Solan are its ancient temples and monasteries. The Shoolini Mata Temple and Jatoli Shiv Temple are popular tourist attractions. One of the most famous monasteries in this region is the Yundung Monastery. The hill-town is named after the Hindu goddess Shoolini Devi, which is a manifestation of another goddess, Durga, in her warrior aspect. Shoolini, when translated literally, means 'the goddess wielding the spear'. Every year in June, a fair venerating the Goddess is held, featuring a 3-day melā at the central Thodo Ground.

Solan is known for the production of quality mushrooms, as a result of the vast mushroom farming in the area, as well as the Directorate of Mushroom Research (DMR) situated at Chambaghat. Due to this fact, Solan is also known as the "Mushroom City of India". Solan is also called the "City of Red Gold", due to the bulk production of tomatoes in the area.

The city has one of the oldest breweries in the country, and also has a 300-year-old fort located at the top of a hill.

Solan is fast becoming a top weekend getaway destination in Himachal, due to location between two important cities Shimla and Chandigarh and improved road access and rising investment in resorts and wellness tourism.

== Historical evolution ==
The history of Solan goes back to the era of Pandavas. According to local folklore, Pandavas lived here during their exile. In 1815, British won the Baghat state (now Solan) from the Gurkhas. Gurkha fort, or Arki Fort, is still standing tall on a mountain near to the city of Solan, and it is one of the historic tourist attractions of Solan. The city has been a capital of the princely Baghat State. The word Baghat is derived from Bau, or Bahu, meaning "many", and Ghat, meaning "pass". Initially, the state headquarters of the Baghat State was located at Bhoch in the Bhuchali pargana. The headquarters of the state was shifted to Solan, after the construction of cantonment in the city; the railway was set up in 1902. The evolution of Solan city can be understood in the following order or sequence:

- Establishment of a cantonment area at Solan by Brits.
- Establishing a brewery in Solan in 1855, due to availability of excellent quality mineral water.
- Shifting of the headquarters of Baghat State from Bhoch to Solan.
- Start of Kalka-Shimla rail line in 1902.
- Start of transportation activity on Kalka-Solan-Shimla road.
- The urban local body, i.e. Municipal Council Solan, came into existence in 1950.
- Solan became an independent district on 1 September 1972, and the town of Solan became the district headquarters.

=== Heritage ===
Solan's history is intertwined with that of the erstwhile princely state of Baghat. The Solan cantonment is still the best, and the most well planned part of the area, hence buildings are made in a planned manner. The church in Solan cantonment is a heritage building, with wooden and stone carvings. It has sloping roofs and arches, reminiscent of British architecture.

The list of heritage buildings in Solan town is as follows:-

- Shoolini Devi temple.
- The Church in Solan cantonment.
- The Solan railway station.
- The Barog railway station.
- Hari Mandir, a famous Lord Krishna temple.
- The railway station and the railway rest house at Salogra.
- The DC residence on Shilli road.
- Anees villa, ancestral home of Salman Rushdie Shilli road near DC residence.
- S.E., PWD office which used to be a durbar hall of Baghat State.
- Old guest house in the palace of Baghat state.
- Khalifa lodge (now the JBT college running in it).
- Kishan Niwas and Hill View on circular road.
- Jatoli Shiv Mandir (5 km. far from Solan on Rajgarh Road).

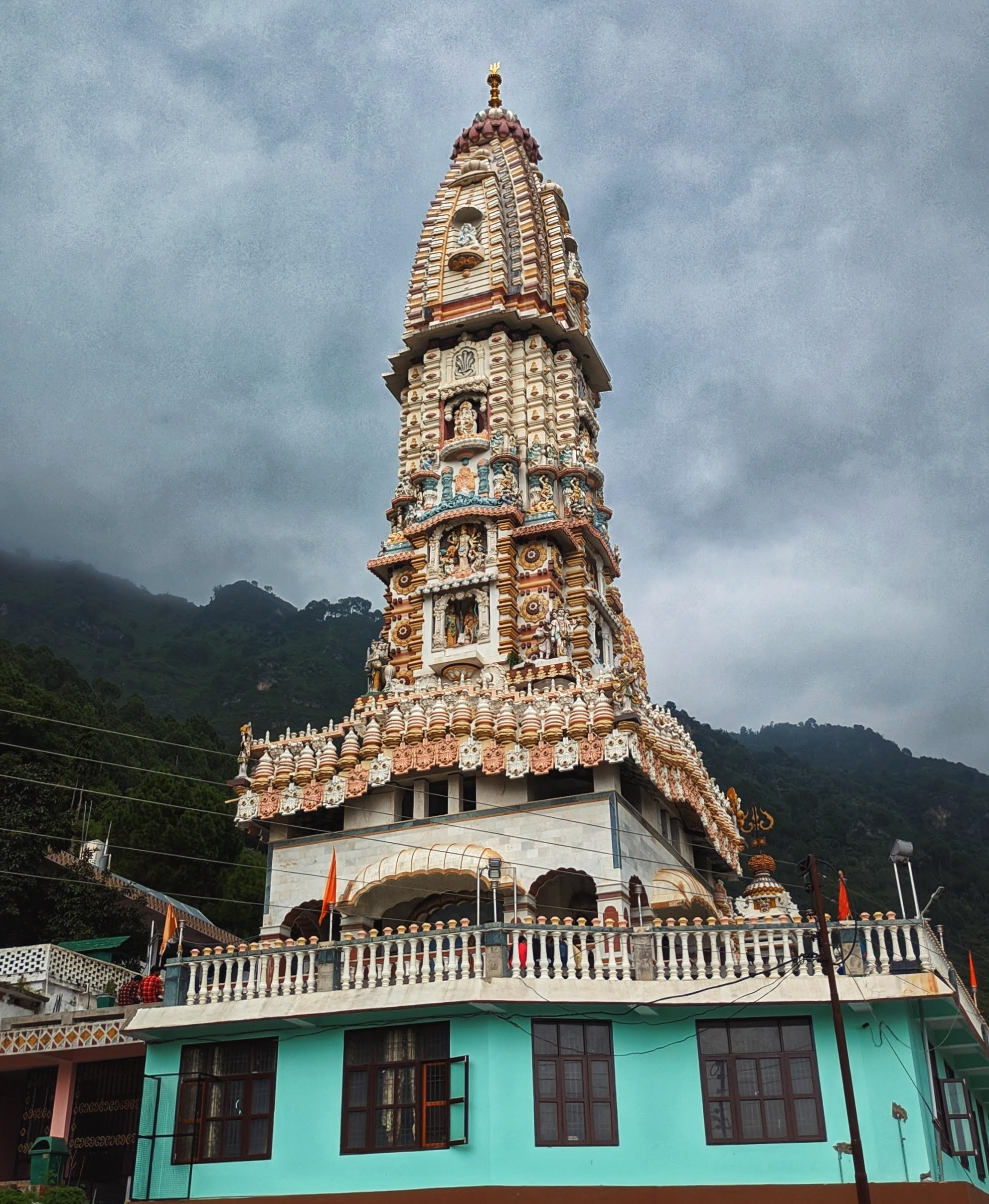
Jatoli Temple, Solan

- Mohan Shakti National Heritage Park (in Hart, 12 km from Solan)
- Mohan Meakin Limited – Mohan Meakin is a large group of companies, which started with Asia's first brewery incorporated in 1855
- Dolanji Bon Monastery, Solan.
- Dr. Yashwant Singh Parmar University of Horticulture and Forestry
- The Palace near Palace Road.
- Pandavas cave at Mount Karol, Chambaghat, Solan
- Dagshai Jail Museum

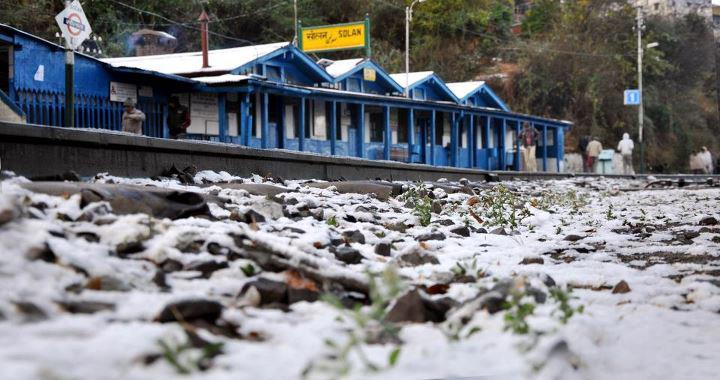
Solan railway station

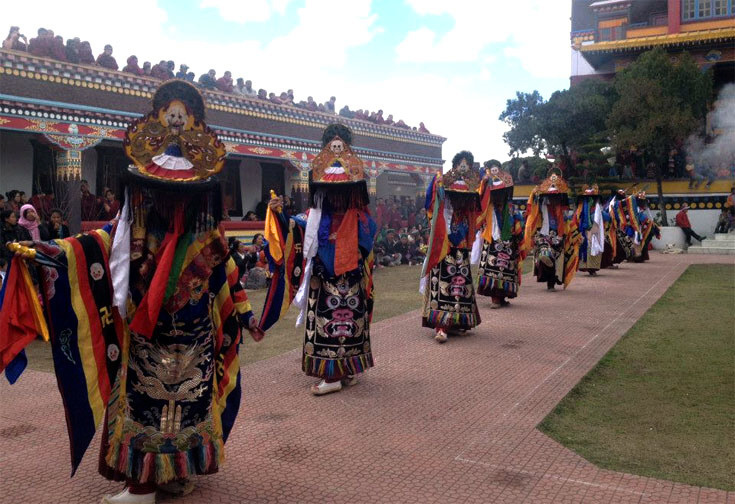
Bon Monastery Dholanji, Solan

== Geography ==
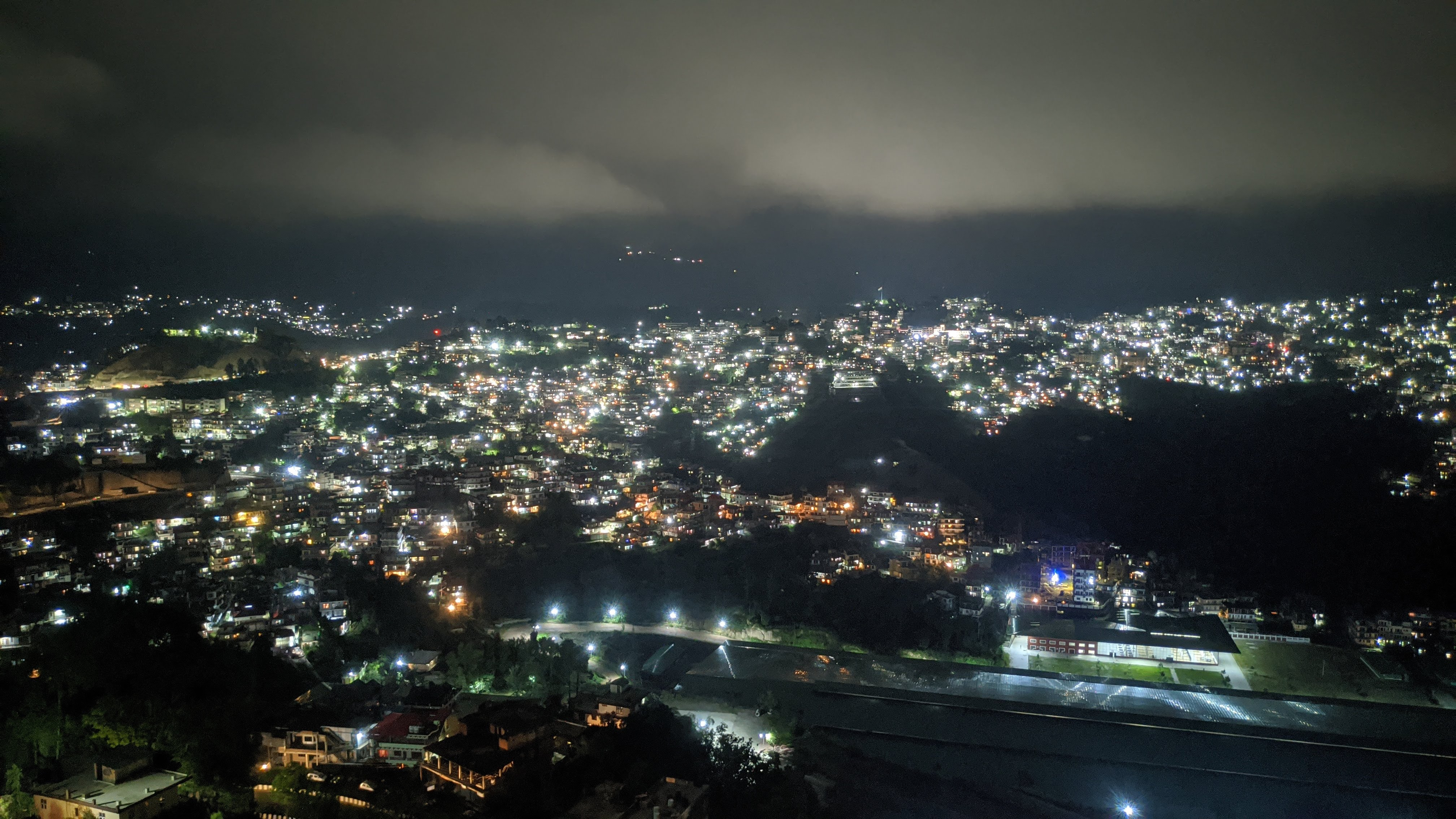

Solan is located at 30.92°N 77.12°E. It has an average elevation of 1502 metres (5249.34 feet). The highest point is atop Mount Karol, at 2280 metres. Pandava's cave, where Pandavas believed to have meditated during their 12-year exile, is located at the mountain top. Solan gets occasional snowfall during winters.

== Climate ==
Situated at an altitude of 1600 metres on average, Solan can be considered an average temperature hill station. Solan is neither as cold as Shimla, nor as hot as Kalka, as the temperatures hardly rise more than 35 °C (95 °F). That is why it is considered as an ideal station, from a residential point of view. During winters, Solan experiences light snowfall. Temperatures typically range from −4 °C (25 °F) to 34 °C (93 °F) over the course of a year, with record high temperature of 39 °C (102.2 °F).

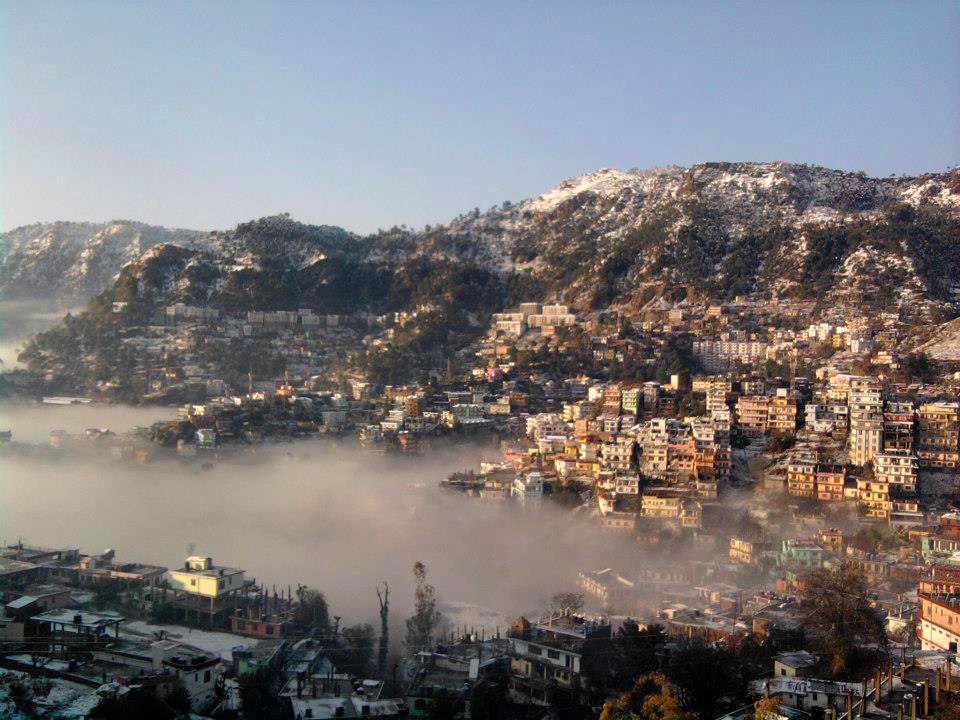
Snowfall 2013, Solan

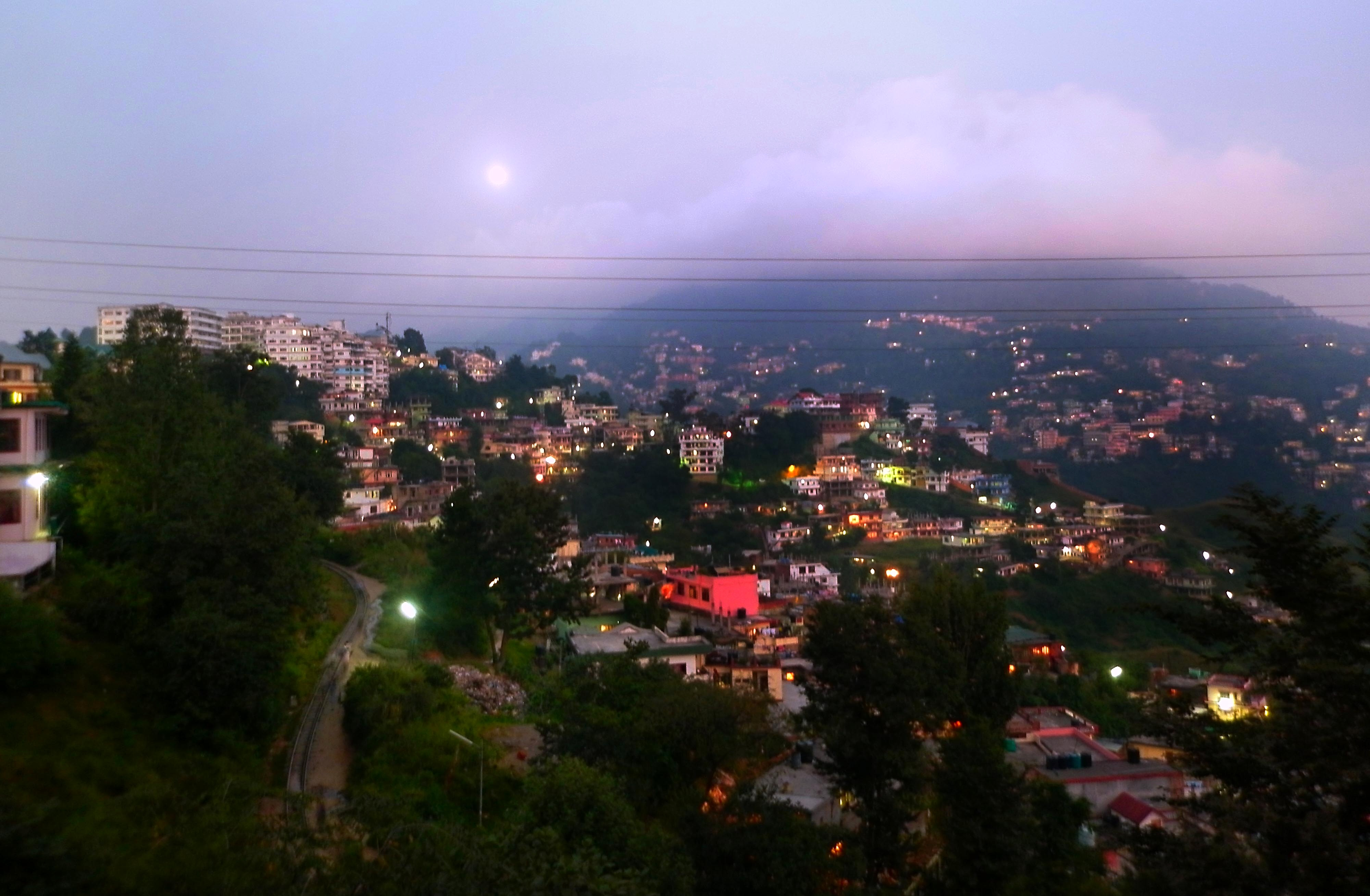
Hills of Solan city in fog during winters

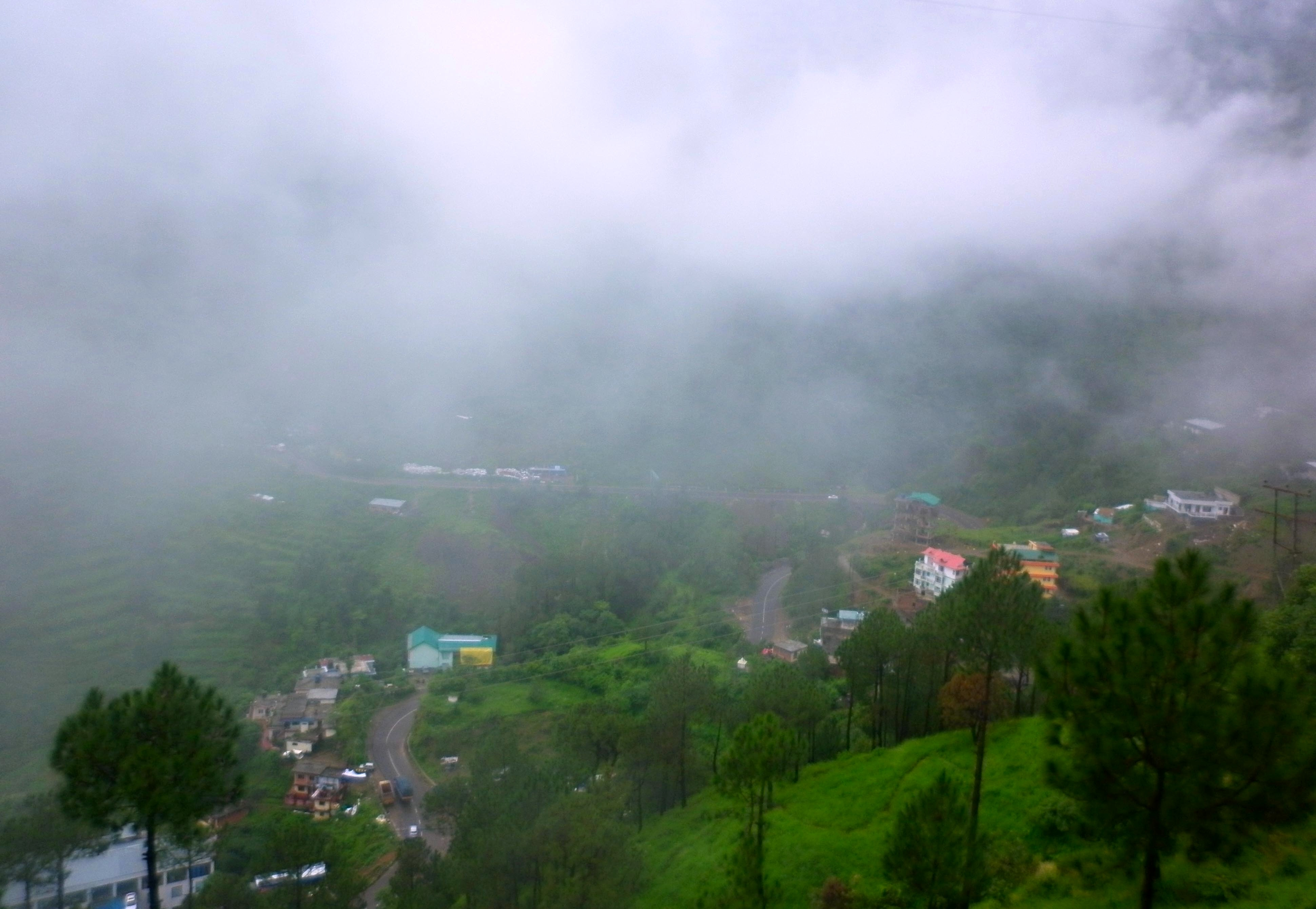
Solan during monsoon

Climate data for Solan (1991–2020, extremes 1999–present)
Month	Jan	Feb	Mar	Apr	May	Jun	Jul	Aug	Sep	Oct	Nov	Dec	Year
Record high °C (°F)	29.0 (84.2)	29.2 (84.6)	32.5 (90.5)	36.0 (96.8)	38.0 (100.4)	39.0 (102.2)	35.1 (95.2)	33.0 (91.4)	33.5 (92.3)	32.7 (90.9)	30.2 (86.4)	27.0 (80.6)	39.0 (102.2)
Mean daily maximum °C (°F)	18.4 (65.1)	19.8 (67.6)	24.0 (75.2)	28.8 (83.8)	31.5 (88.7)	31.0 (87.8)	28.8 (83.8)	28.2 (82.8)	28.1 (82.6)	27.0 (80.6)	23.8 (74.8)	21.0 (69.8)	25.8 (78.4)
Mean daily minimum °C (°F)	2.3 (36.1)	4.5 (40.1)	8.4 (47.1)	12.5 (54.5)	16.0 (60.8)	18.6 (65.5)	20.2 (68.4)	19.8 (67.6)	16.8 (62.2)	10.5 (50.9)	5.8 (42.4)	2.8 (37.0)	11.6 (52.9)
Record low °C (°F)	−3.6 (25.5)	−2.8 (27.0)	0.5 (32.9)	4.6 (40.3)	8.5 (47.3)	12.5 (54.5)	16.0 (60.8)	15.0 (59.0)	10.5 (50.9)	5.0 (41.0)	1.0 (33.8)	−2.5 (27.5)	−3.6 (25.5)
Average rainfall mm (inches)	49.5 (1.95)	67.1 (2.64)	55.9 (2.20)	35.7 (1.41)	51.1 (2.01)	123.0 (4.84)	221.6 (8.72)	206.1 (8.11)	148.2 (5.83)	14.3 (0.56)	4.5 (0.18)	26.4 (1.04)	1,003.5 (39.51)
Average rainy days	3.1	4.2	3.7	3.2	4.2	7.2	11.3	10.1	5.6	1.1	0.6	1.7	56.0
Average relative humidity (%) (at 17:30 IST)	52	50	44	38	38	53	74	78	71	53	51	51	54
Source: India Meteorological Department

== Municipal Corporation and District administration ==
Municipal Corporation Solan is spread over an area of 33.43 km^{2} with a residential population of 39,256. It is the third largest Municipal Corporation of Himachal Pradesh.

== Demographics ==
According to the 2011 Indian census, Solan has a population of 39,256, making it the second largest city in Himachal, after Shimla. Solan had an average literacy rate of 85.02%.

Solan is a Municipal Council city. It is divided into 17 wards for which elections are held every 5 years. The Solan Municipal Council has population of 39,256, of which 21,182 are males, while 18,074 are females, as per report released by Census India 2011.

Population of children with age of 0–6 is 3,524, which is 8.98% of the total population of Solan (M Cl). In Solan Municipal Council, the female sex ratio is of 8:53, against state average of 9:72. Moreover, child age ratio in Solan is around 886, compared to Himachal Pradesh state average of 909. Literacy rate of Solan city is 93.02% higher than the state average of 82.80%. In Solan, male literacy is around 94.01%, while female literacy rate is 91.86%.

Solan Municipal Council has total administration over 9,803 houses, to which it supplies basic amenities, like water and sewerage.

Solan Work Profile Out of total population, 15,640 were engaged in work or business activity. Of this 12,147 were males, while 3,493 were females. In census surveys, 'worker' is defined as a person who does business, jobs, services, cultivation, and labour activity for profit. Of total 15,640 working population, 93.31% were engaged in main work, while 6.69% of total workers were engaged in marginal work.

City area Solan Planning Area covers 3,343 hectares = 33.43 km^{2} of land (2nd Largest city area in Himachal Pradesh).

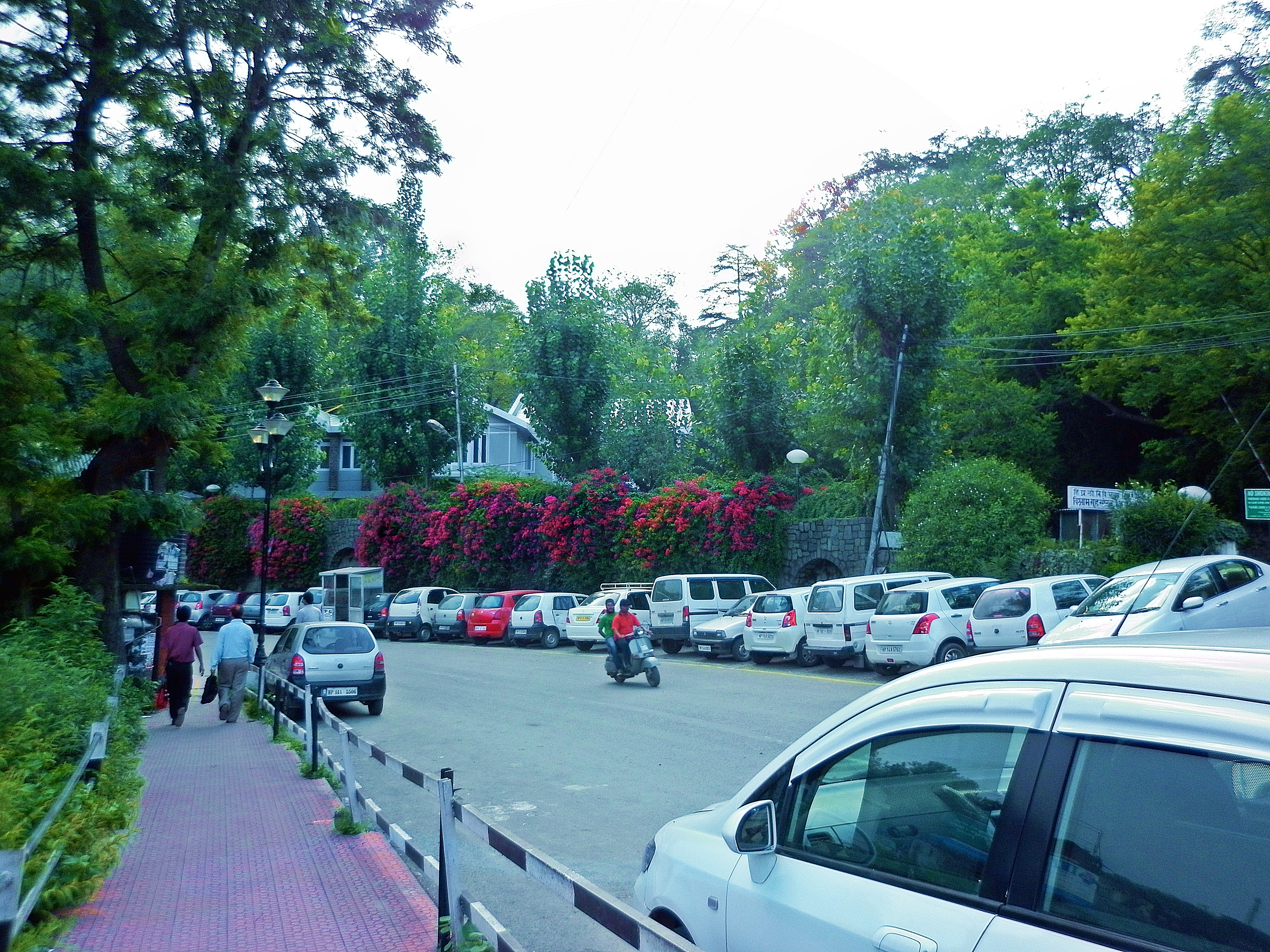
HPPWD Solan rest house and parking

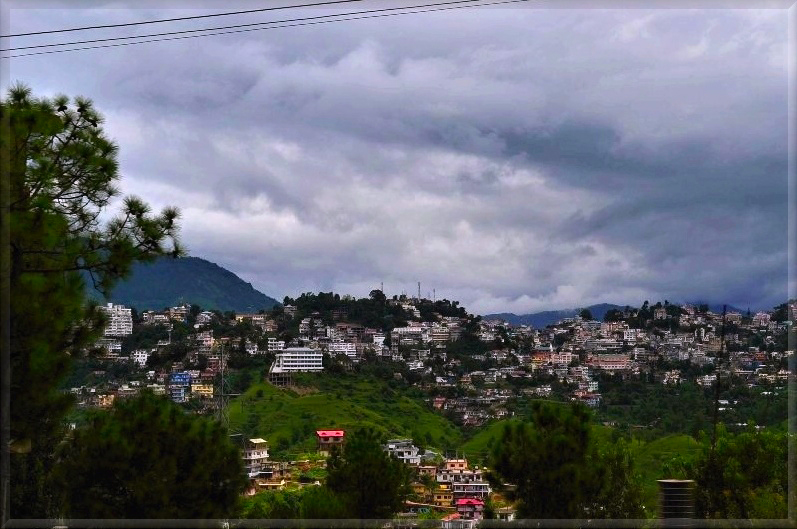
Solan city

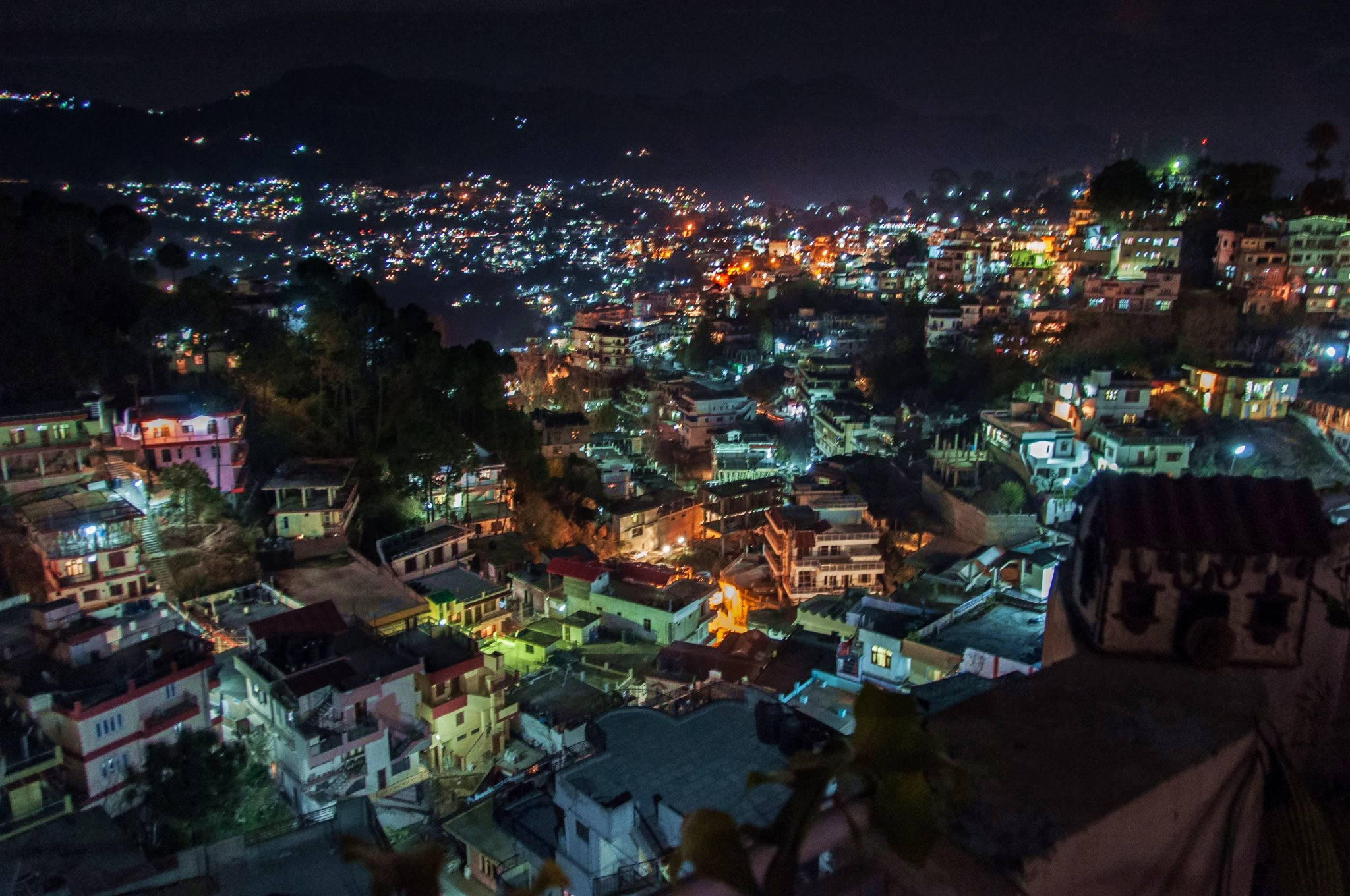
Twinkling hills of solan city at night

== Flora and fauna ==
The Solan planning area contains Chil, Ban, and Kail, mainly deodar cedar and pine trees in the city. Oak forests are also at higher elevations around moist locations. Places like Chail is the most predominant one for different species of vegetation. Besides the indigenous vegetation, there are ornamental and alien plantations too. It consists of silver oak, jhakranda, bottle brush, weeping willows, kachnar, grasses, etc.

Due to variations in altitude, there is a variety of fauna in the region. The Himalayan black bear and panther, Leopard are the carnivores typically found in the area, whereas the Ghoral and the barking deer are the herbivores, found in and around the Solan planning area. Other animals include the jackal, mongoose, wildcats, monkeys and langurs. Galliformes include Red junglefowl and pigeon.

== Notable sites ==
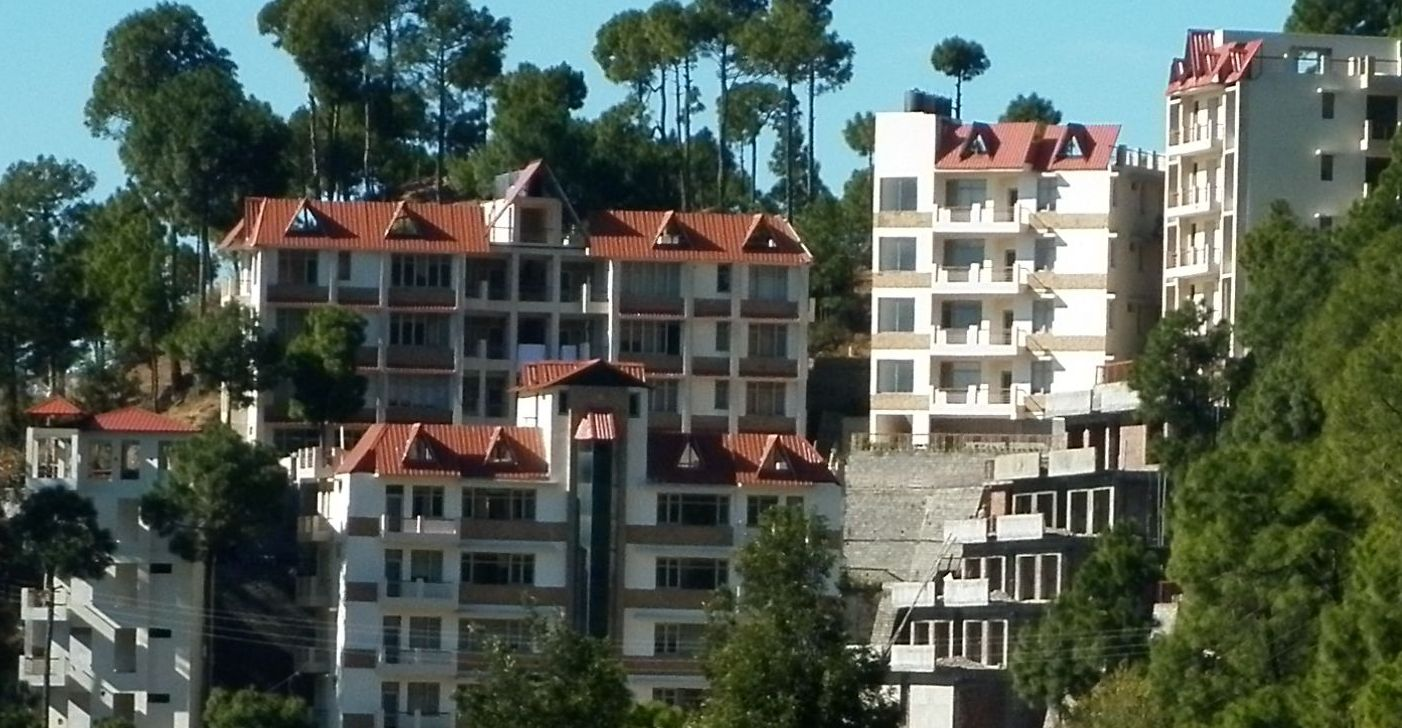
Sharvilla Health resorts Solan

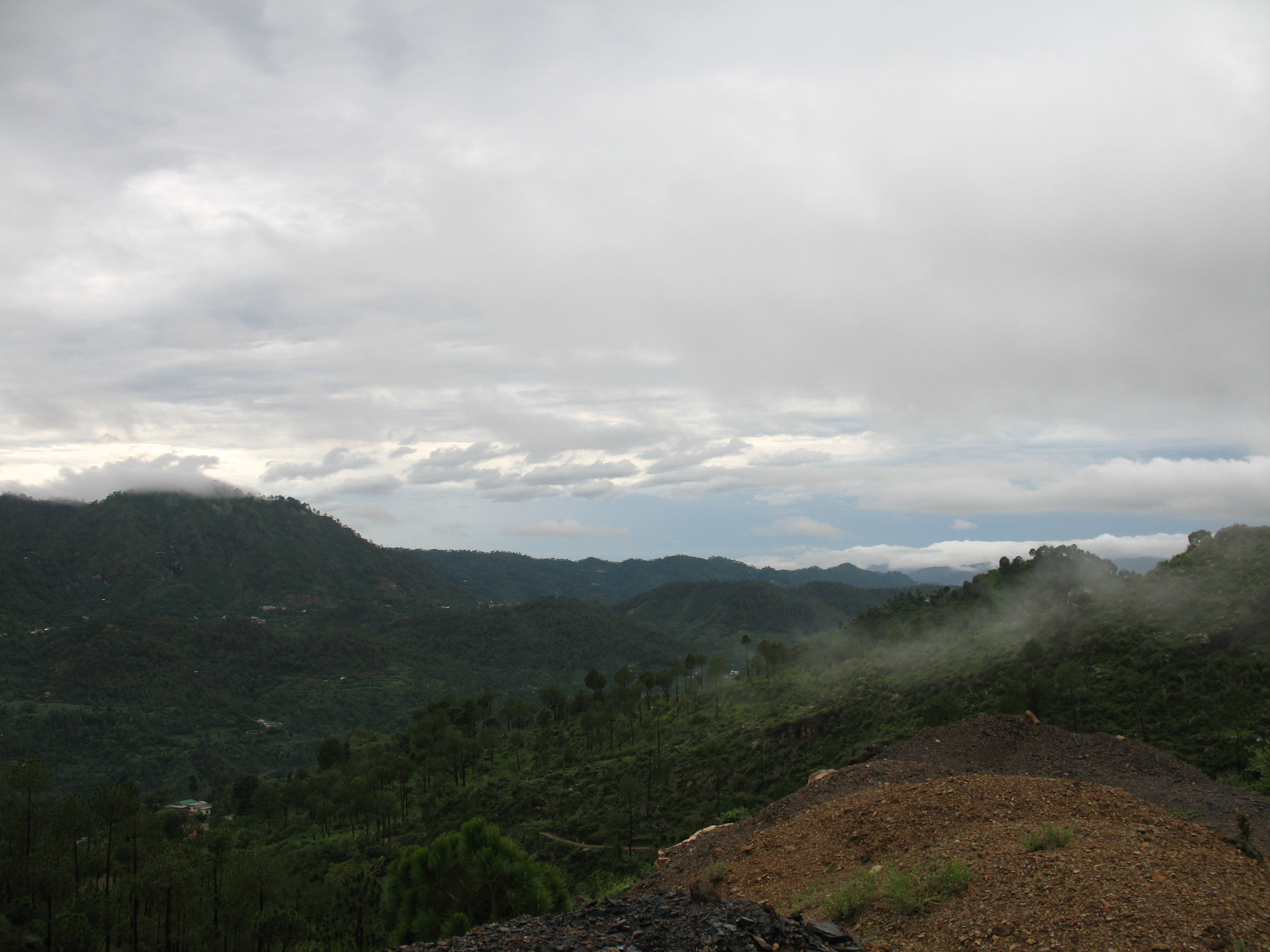
Hill Ranges of the Solan area looking south

- Badi ki dhar
- Dr. Yashwant Singh Parmar University of Horticulture and Forestry
- Barog railway station
- Chail Sanctuary
- Water Park and Cafe at Sadhupul
- Mohan Park – Built by Mohan Meakins breweries near Chambaghat on the Mall road, it has a terrace garden, rides, etc.
- Subhash Chandra Bose Park – Hospital road Solan.

== Sports ==
As of 2018 an indoor stadium was planned.

== Education ==
=== Private universities ===
- Baddi University of Emerging Sciences and Technologies
- Chitkara University, Himachal Pradesh
- Jaypee University of Information Technology
- Maharaja Agrasen University

Shoolini University and Jaypee University, were ranked '100-150' among Universities in India in the National Institutional Ranking Framework (NIRF) in 2019

== Media ==
- Divya Himachal – Mera Solan newspaper

== Notable people ==
- Rajeev Bindal – Ex Speaker Himachal Pradesh Vidhan Sabha
- Dhani Ram Shandil – Ex Member of Parliament
- Major Bikramjeet Kanwarpal - Indian film and television actor
- Ruhani Sharma - Indian film actress

== Gallery ==
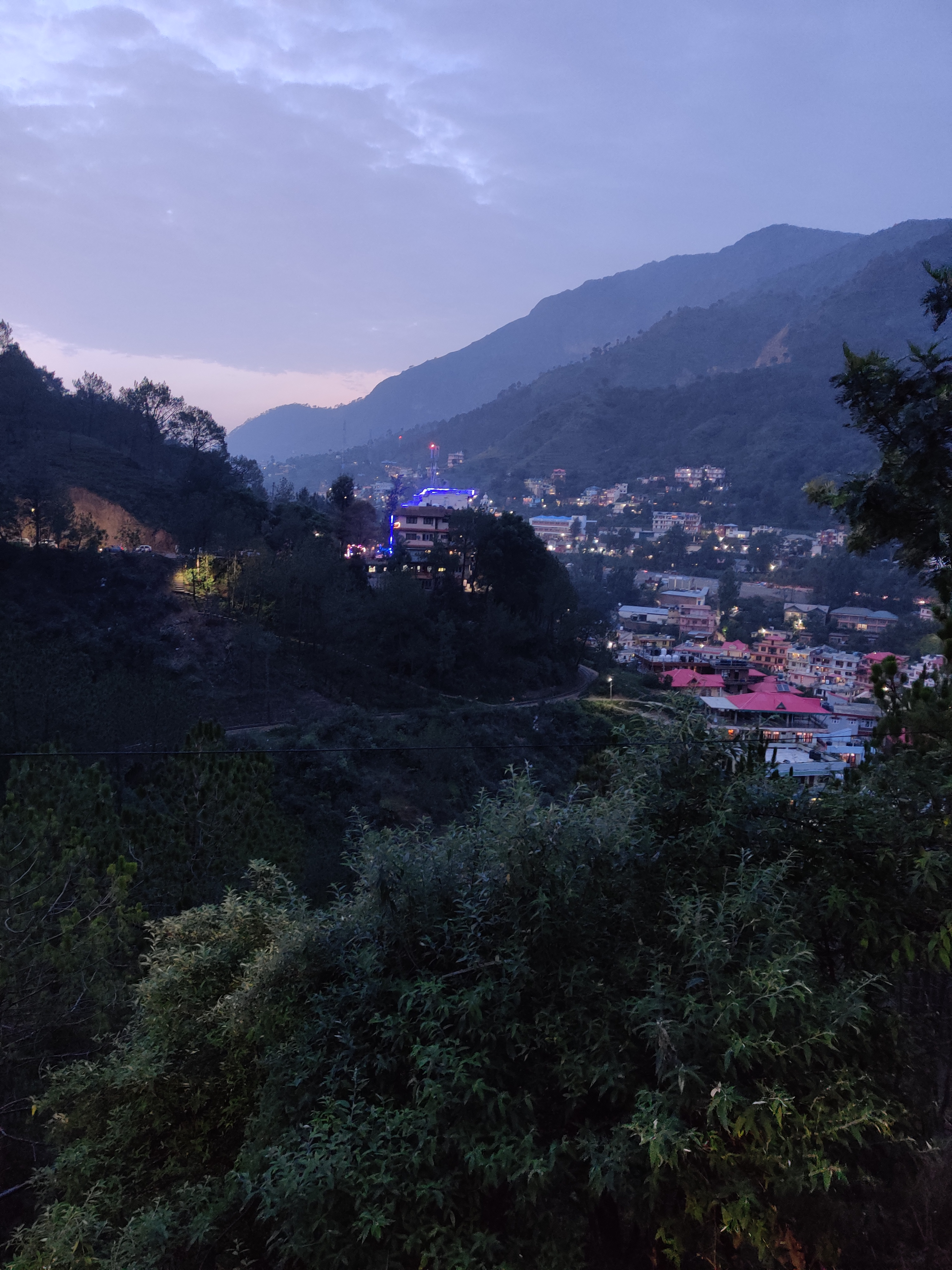
Twilight view of Solan in monsoon from Mohan Park

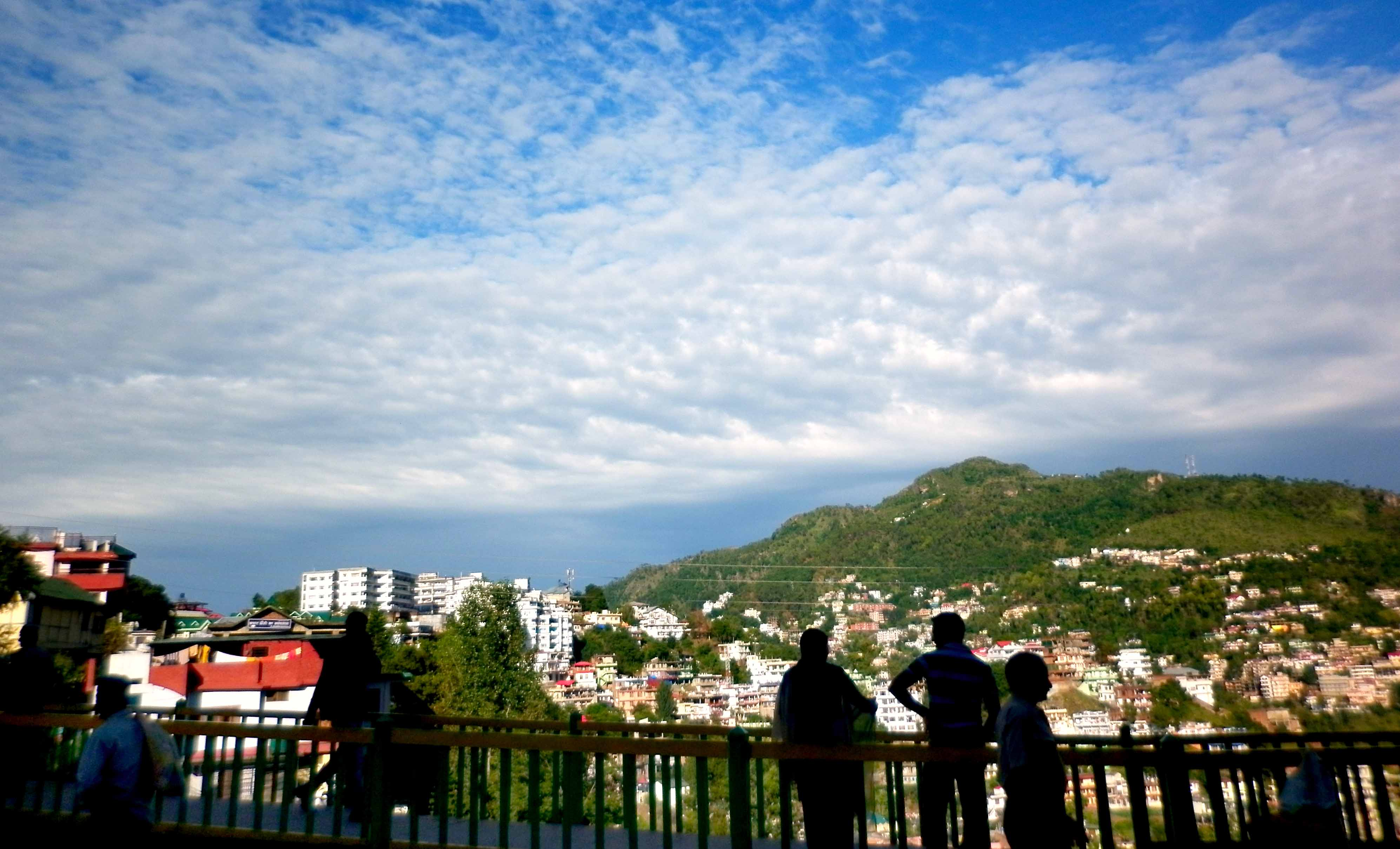
Solan bypass

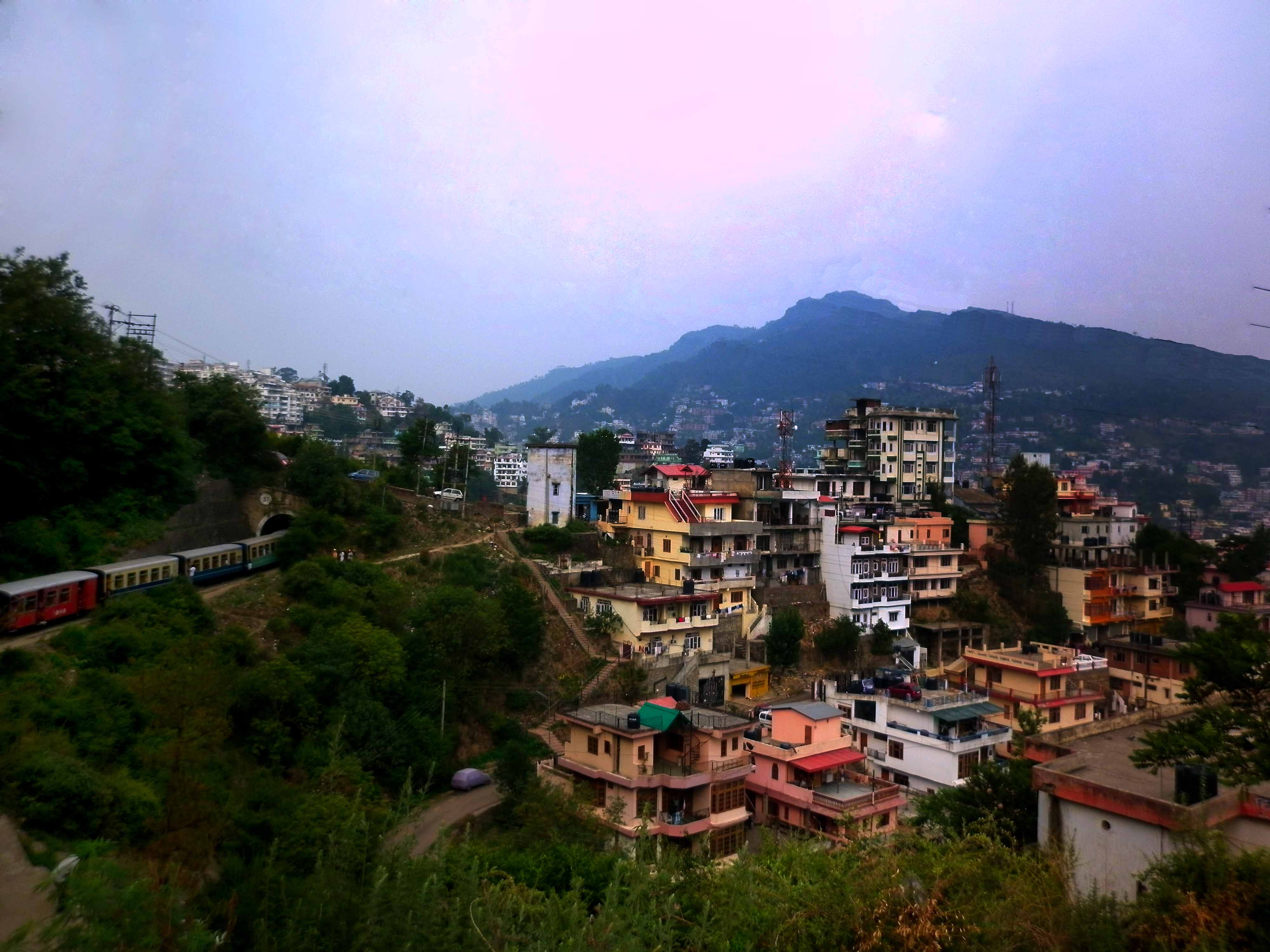
Solan Bypass

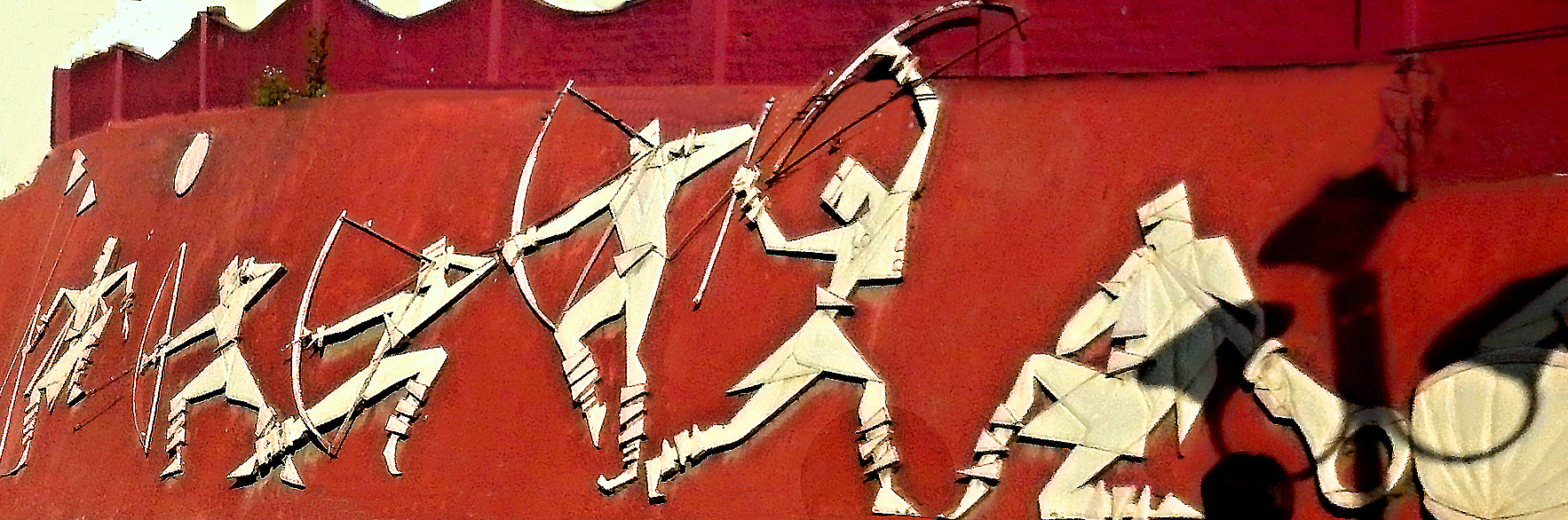
Thoda dance wall painting, The Mall, Solan

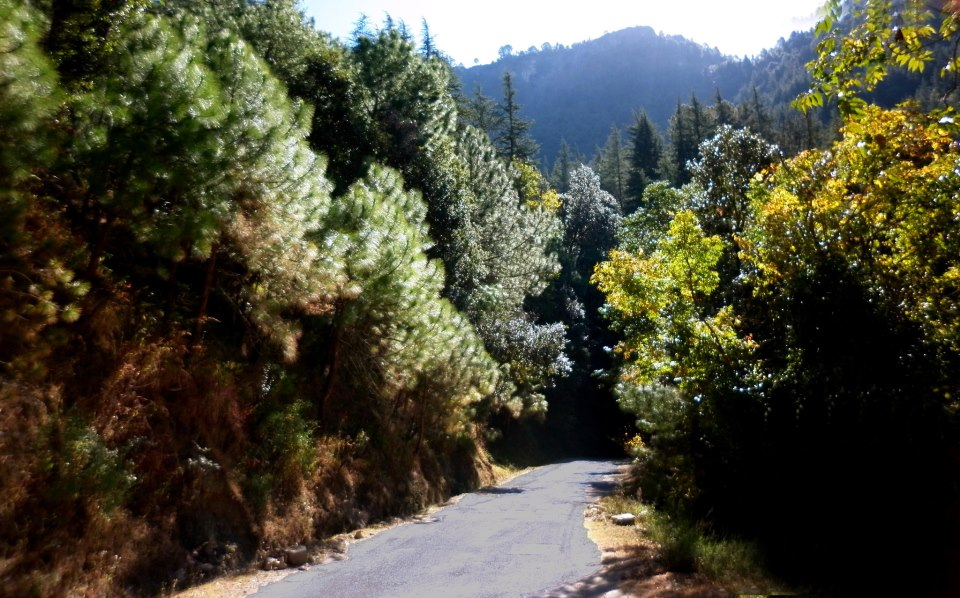
Shilly sanctuary area Solan

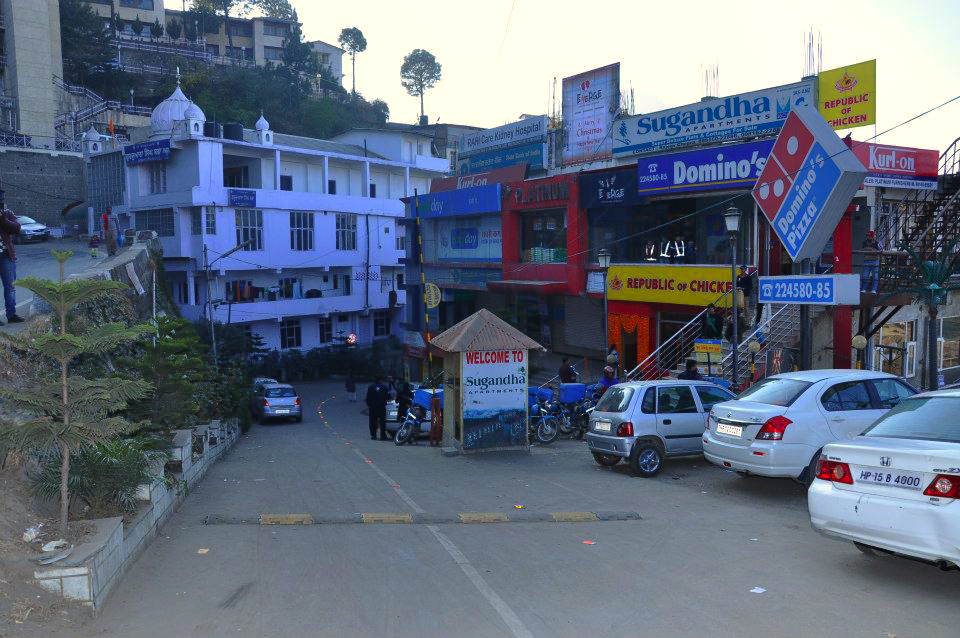
Platinum Mall, Solan

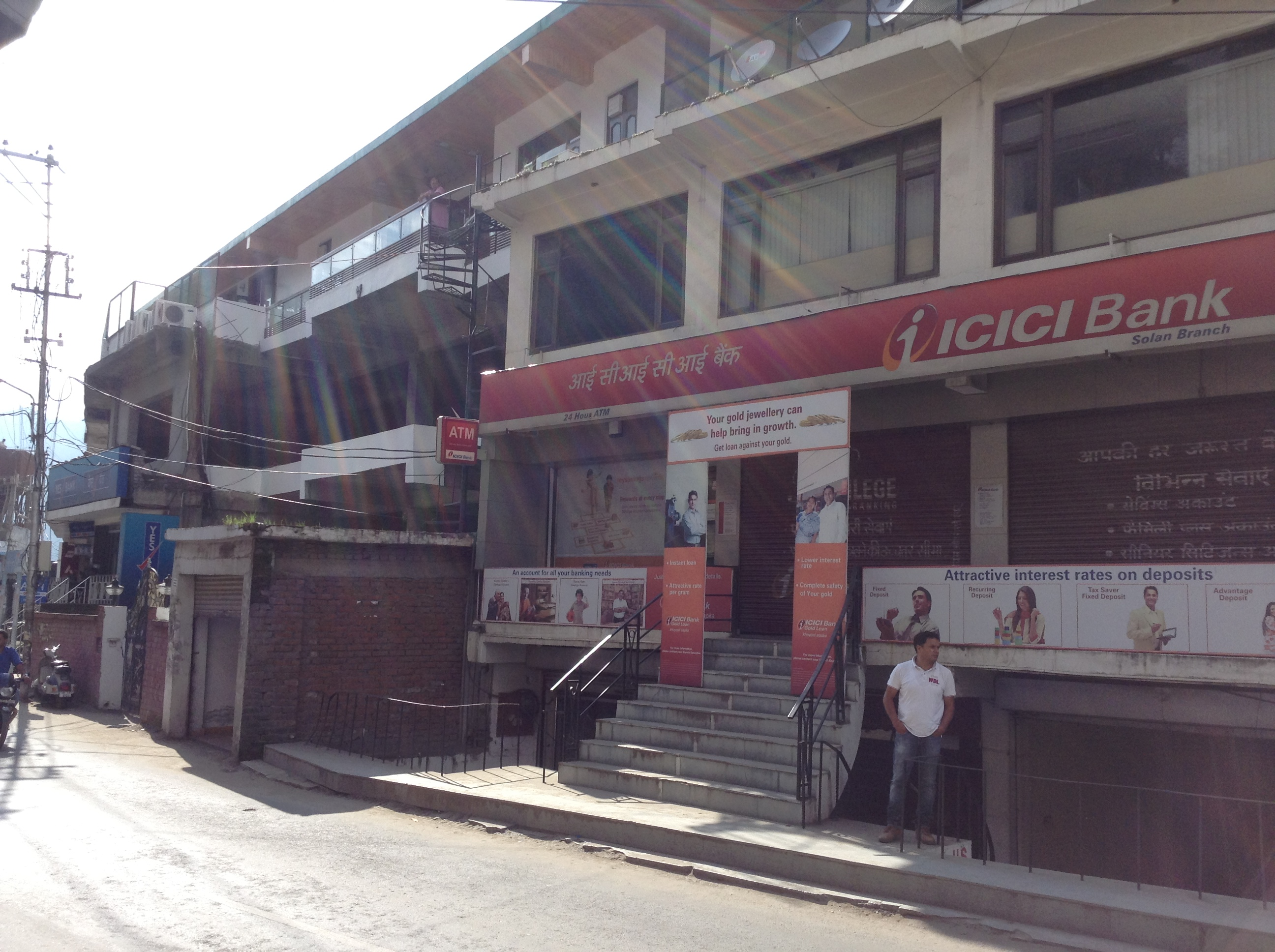
Bank lane, The Mall, Solan

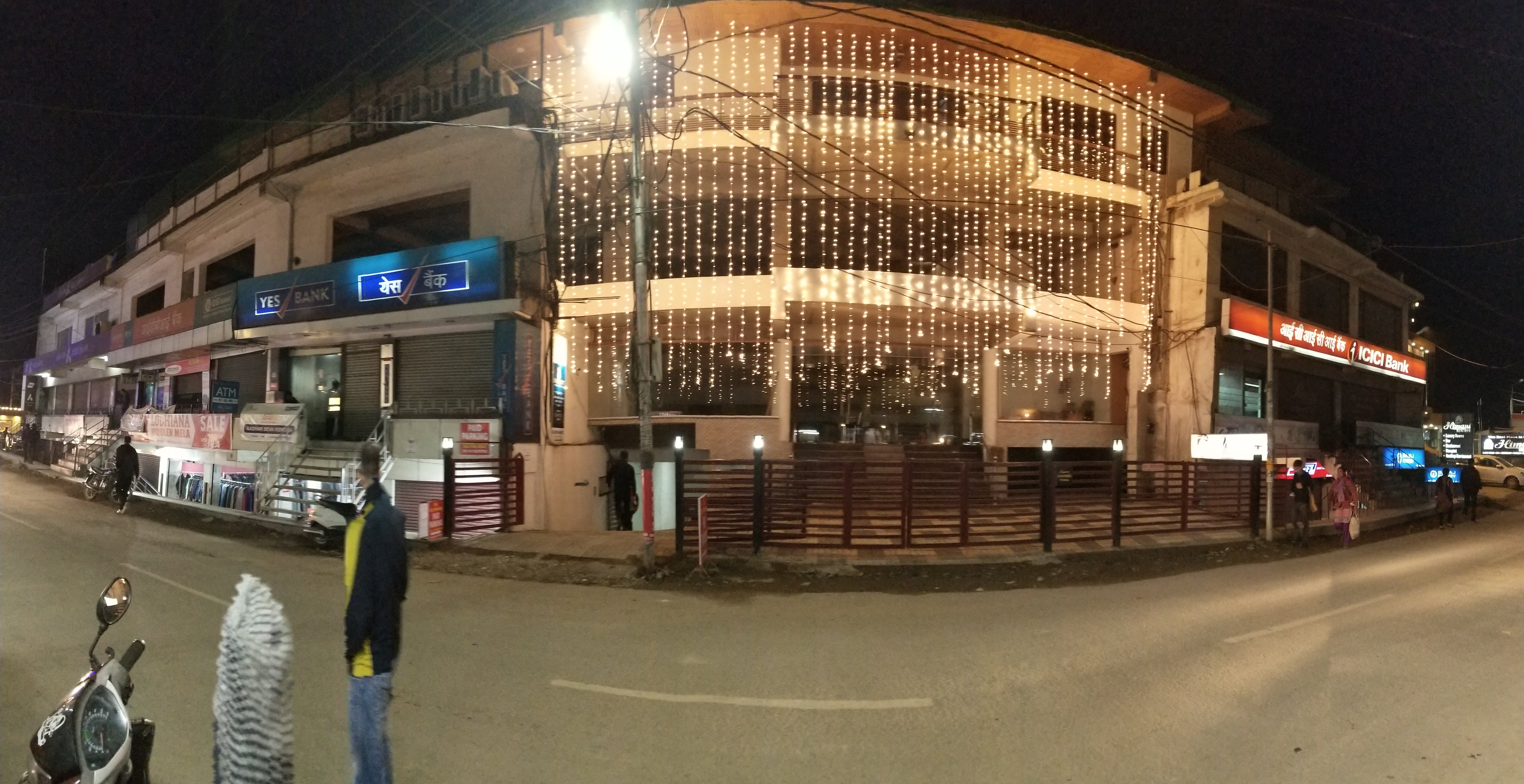
Commercial mall, Solan.

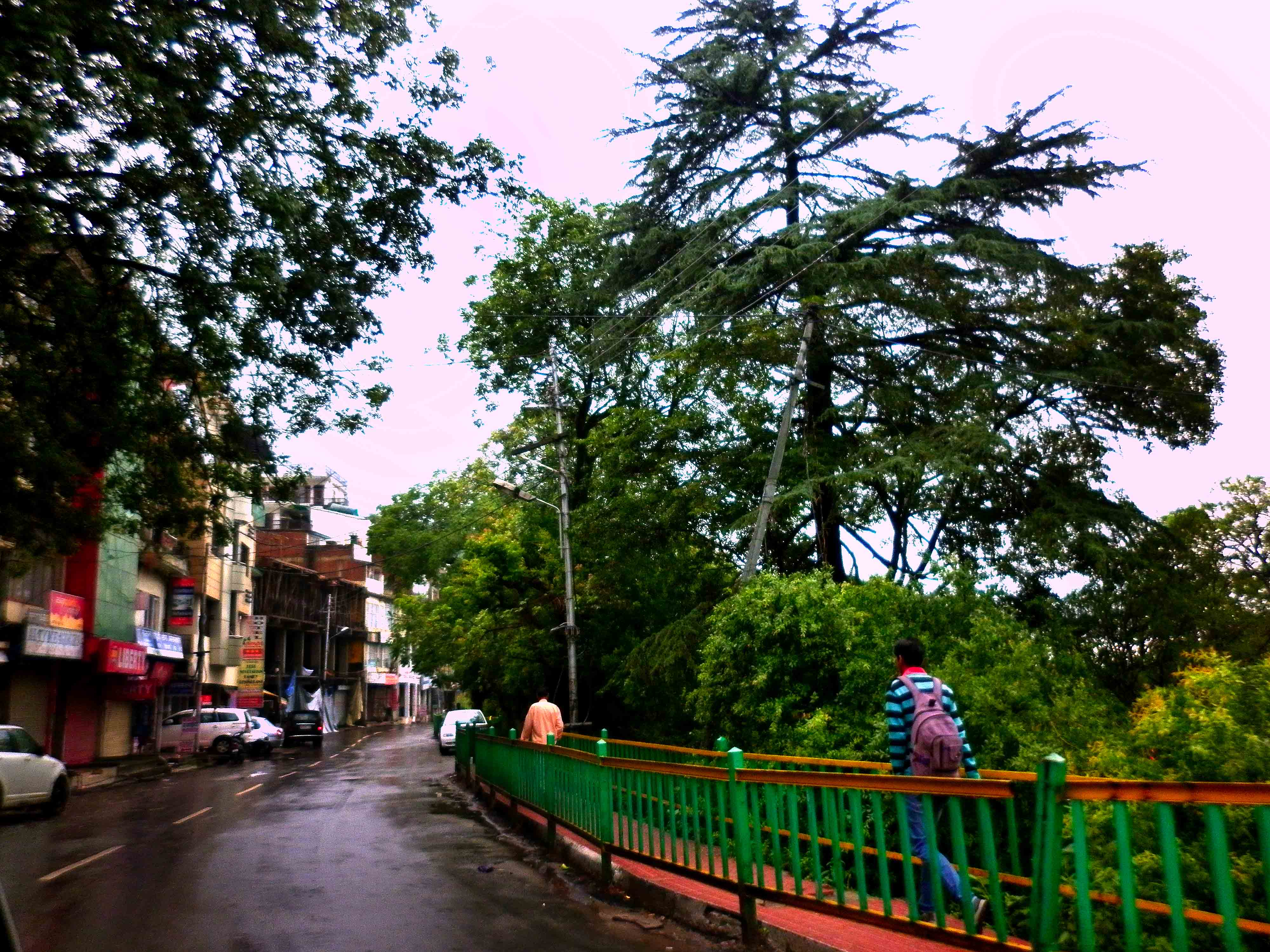
Footpath on Mall road

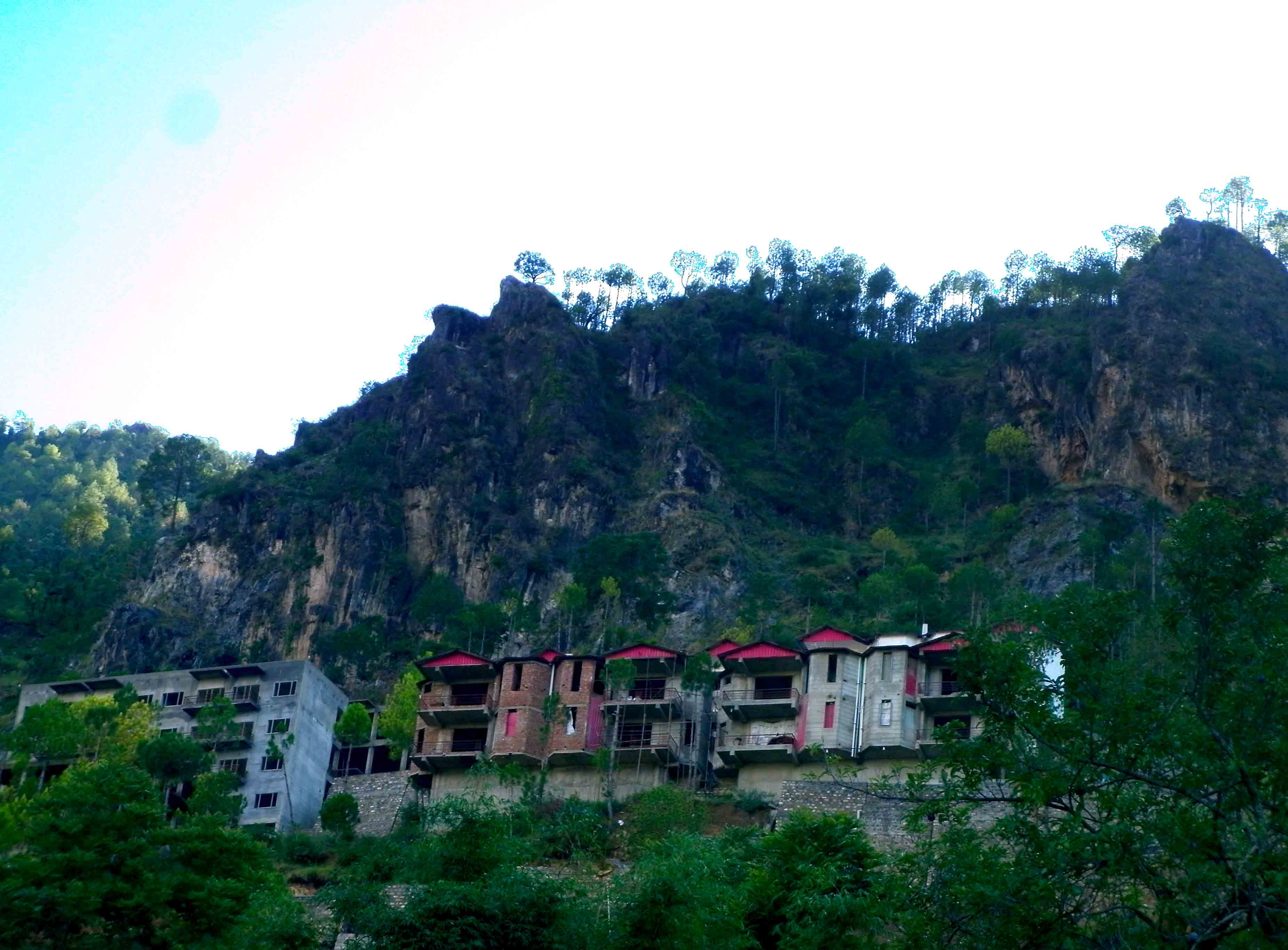
Amravati Hills, Solan

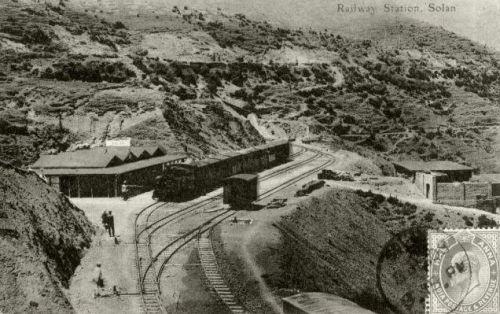
Solan railway station in 1911

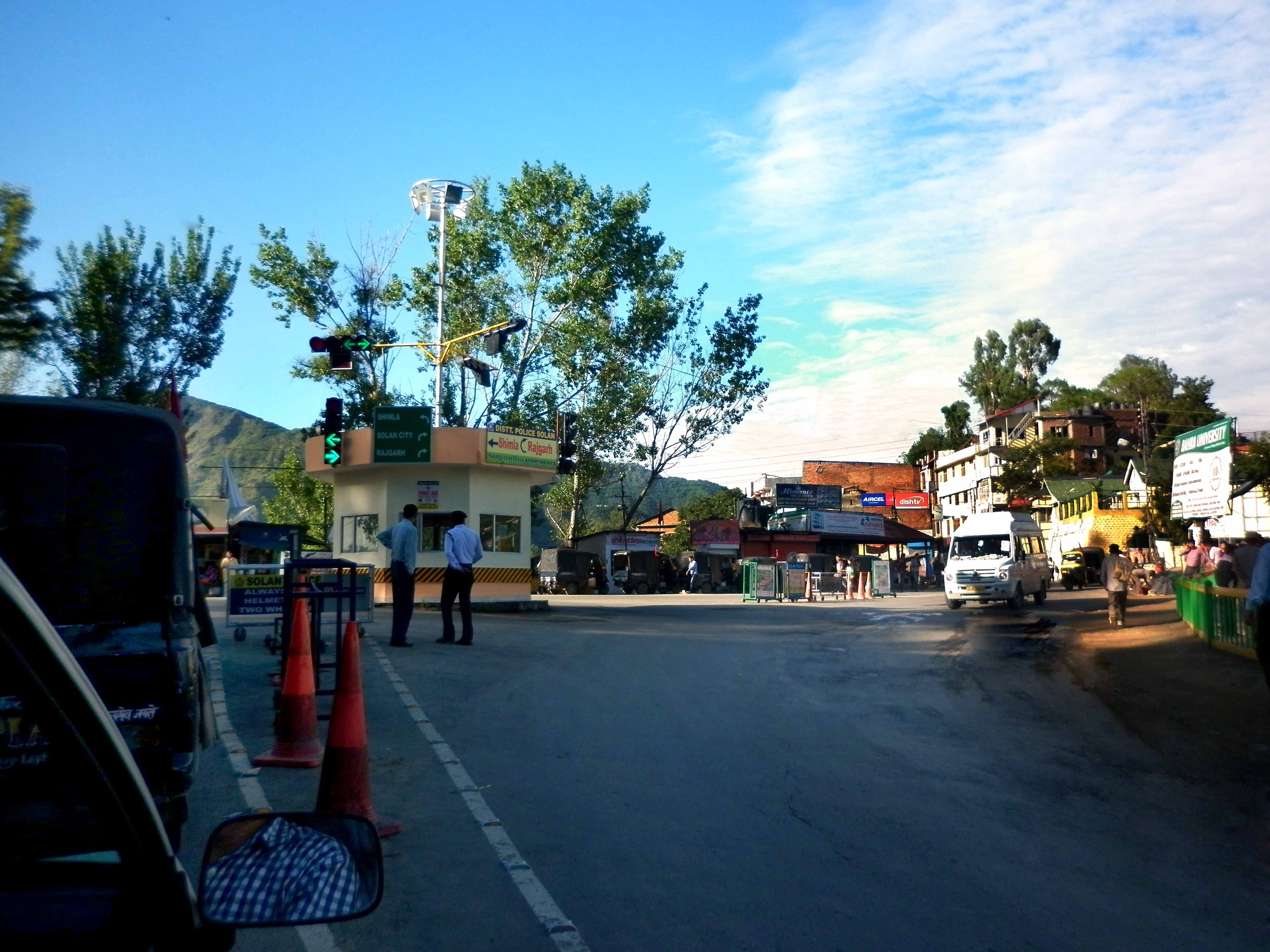
Solan Bypass traffic lights

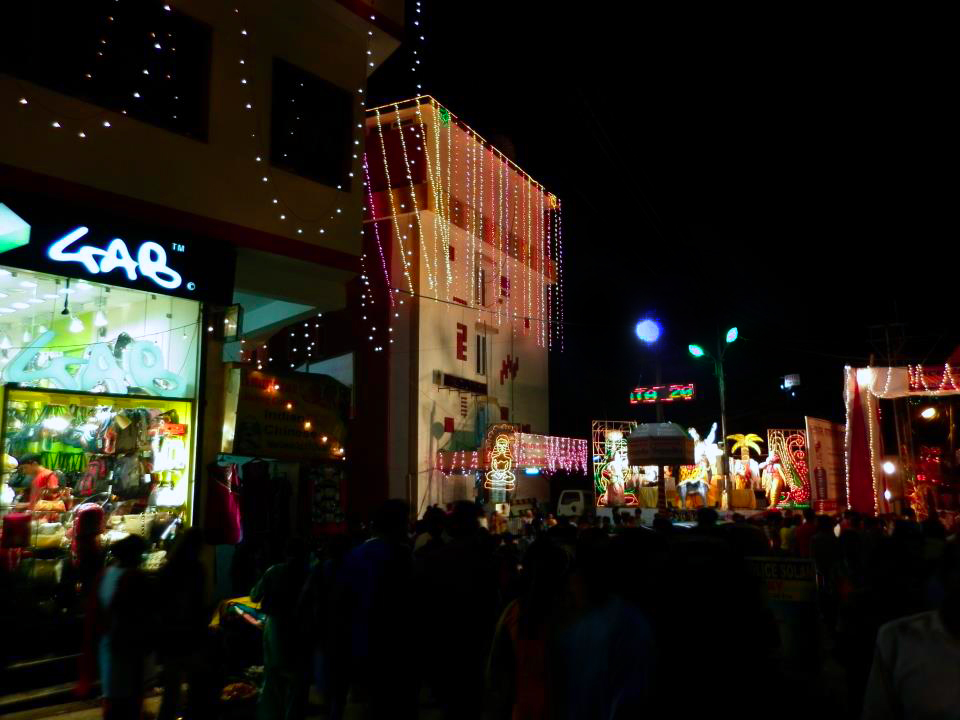
Old DC office during Shoolini Utsav 2012

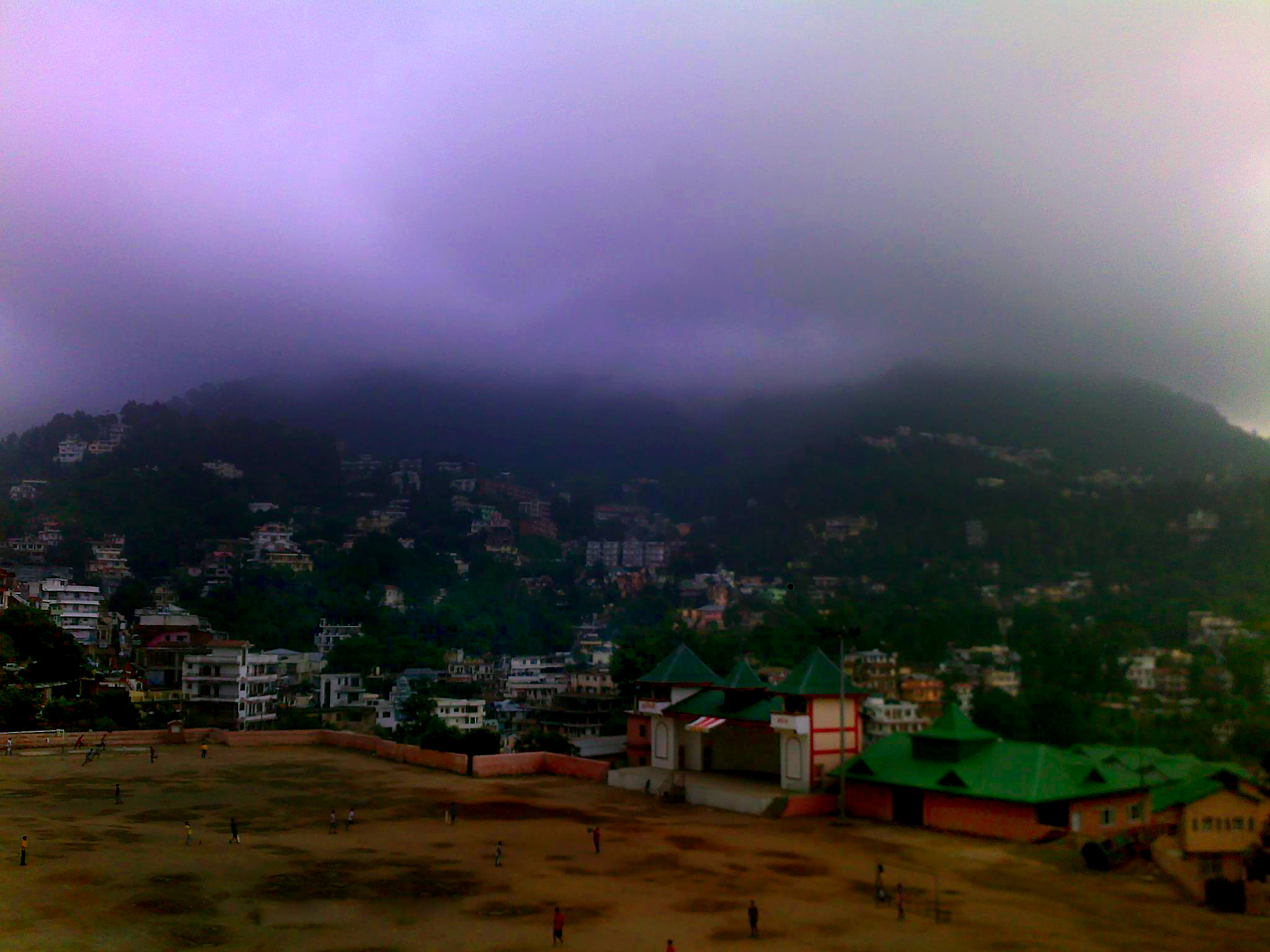
Historical Thodo ground Solan

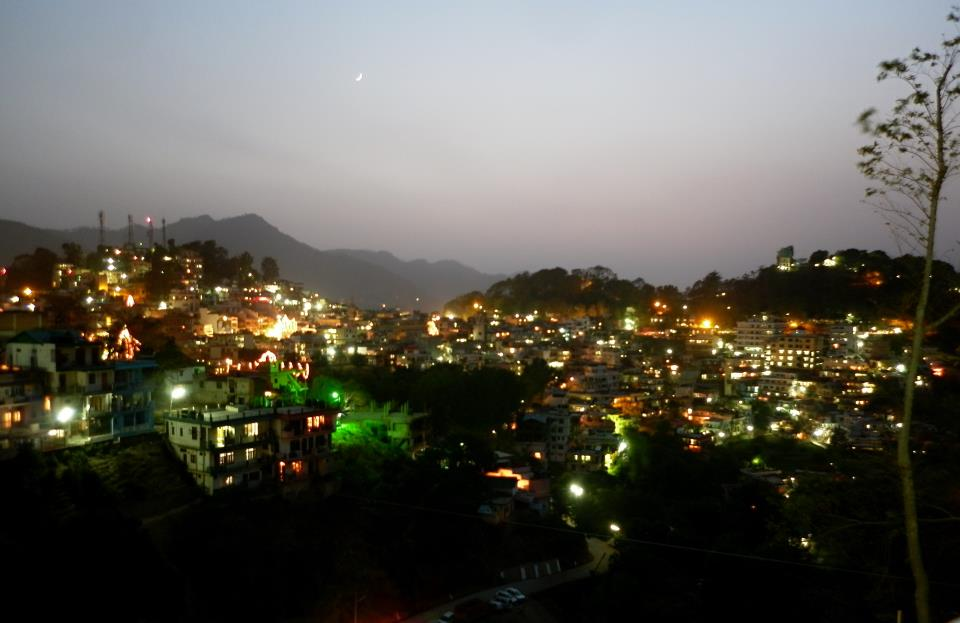
North-east part of Solan city at night

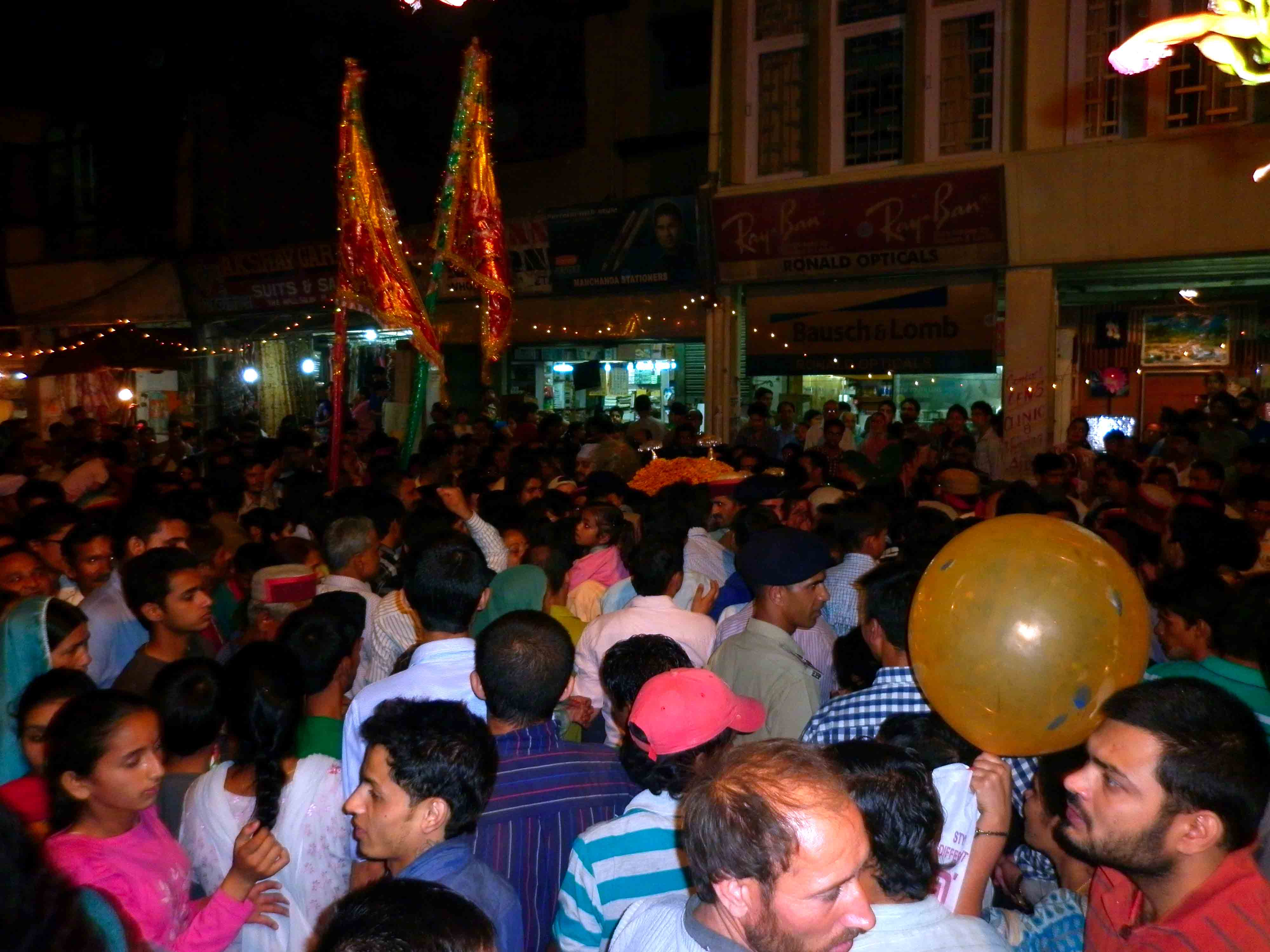
Sakpal of Shoolini Devi

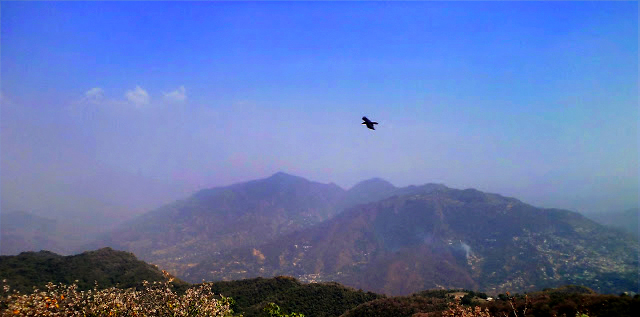
Solan city from Mount Karol

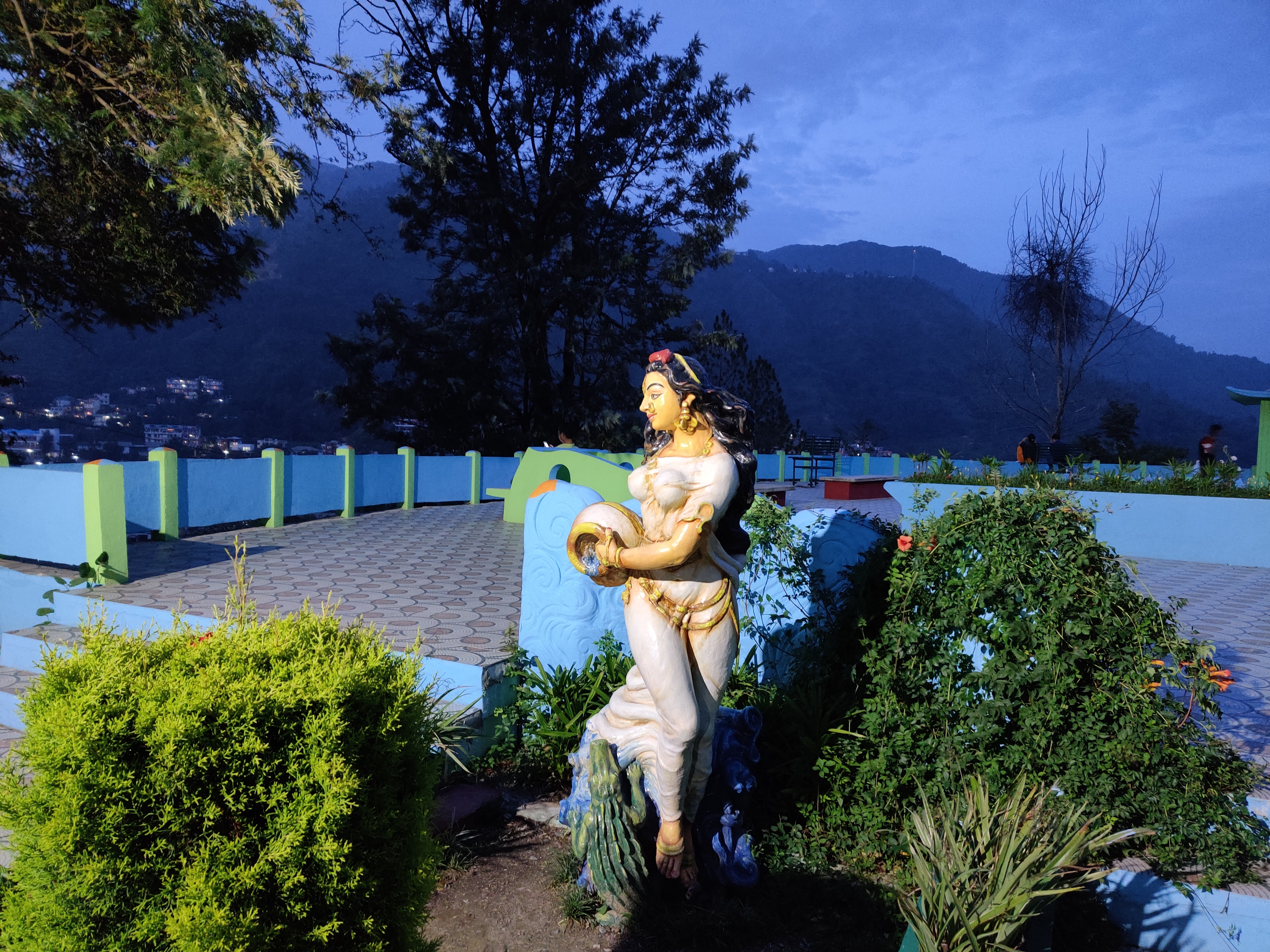
Himachal Belle, Mohan Park
