= Solan Municipal Corporation =

Local civic body of Solan, Himachal Pradesh, India

Type
- Type: Municipal Corporation

Leadership
- Mayor: Sushma Sharma, BJP since 2026
- Deputy Mayor: Gaurav Rajput, BJP since 2026
- Municipal commissioner: Ekta Kapta, IAS

Structure
- Seats: 17
- Political groups: Government (10): BJP (10); Opposition (7): INC (6); IND (1)
- Length of term: 5 Years

Elections
- Last election: 17 May 2026
- Next election: 2031

Meeting place
- Solan, Himachal Pradesh

Website
- Official website

Solan Municipal Corporation (SMC) is the municipal corporation of Solan District in Himachal Pradesh, and is the chief nodal agency for the administration of the city. Municipal Corporation mechanism in India was introduced during British Rule with formation of municipal corporation in Madras (Chennai) in 1688, later followed by municipal corporations in Bombay (Mumbai) and Calcutta (Kolkata) by 1762. Solan Municipal Corporation is headed by Mayor of city and governed by Commissioner. Solan Municipal Corporation has been formed with functions to improve the infrastructure of town.

== History and administration ==
Solan Municipal Corporation was formed in to improve the infrastructure of the town as per the needs of local population. Solan Municipal Corporation has been categorised into wards and each ward is headed by councillor for which elections are held every 5 years.

Solan Municipal Corporation is governed by Mayor Sushma Sharma and administered by Municipal Commissioner Ekta Kapta, IAS.

== Revenue sources ==
The following are the Income sources for the corporation from the Central and State Government.

=== Revenue from taxes ===
Following is the Tax related revenue for the corporation.

- Property tax.
- Profession tax.
- Entertainment tax.
- Grants from Central and State Government like Goods and Services Tax.
- Advertisement tax.

=== Revenue from non-tax sources ===
Following is the Non Tax related revenue for the corporation.

- Water usage charges.
- Fees from Documentation services.
- Rent received from municipal property.
- Funds from municipal bonds.

== Elections ==
=== 2026 ===
S.No.	Party name	Party symbol	Councillors	Change	Wards
1.	BJP		10	▲3	17
2.	INC		6	▼3	17
3.	IND		1	Steady	17

=== 2021 ===
S.No.	Party name	Party symbol	Councillors	Change	Wards
1.	INC		9	Steady	17
2.	BJP		7	Steady	17
3.	IND		1	Steady	17
