= Jatoli Temple =

- जटोली मँदिर
- Front view of Jatoli Temple

- Location within Himachal Pradesh Location within India

Religion
- Affiliation: Hinduism
- Deity: Shiva
- Festival: Shivratri

Location
- Location: Jatoli, Solan, Solan district
- State: Himachal Pradesh
- Country: India
- Coordinates: 30.880333°N 77.126875°E

Architecture
- Type: Dravidian
- Founder: Swami Krishnananda Paramhansa
- Groundbreaking: 1974
- Completed: 2013

Jatoli Temple is a Hindu temple located in Solan, Solan district in North Indian state of Himachal Pradesh, India, dedicated to Lord Shiva. The temple is situated 4 kilometres (2.5 mi) from the city of Solan on the Solan-Rajgarh road. It is the highest temple in Asia dedicated to Shiva.
