= Mohan Park =

Park in Solan, India

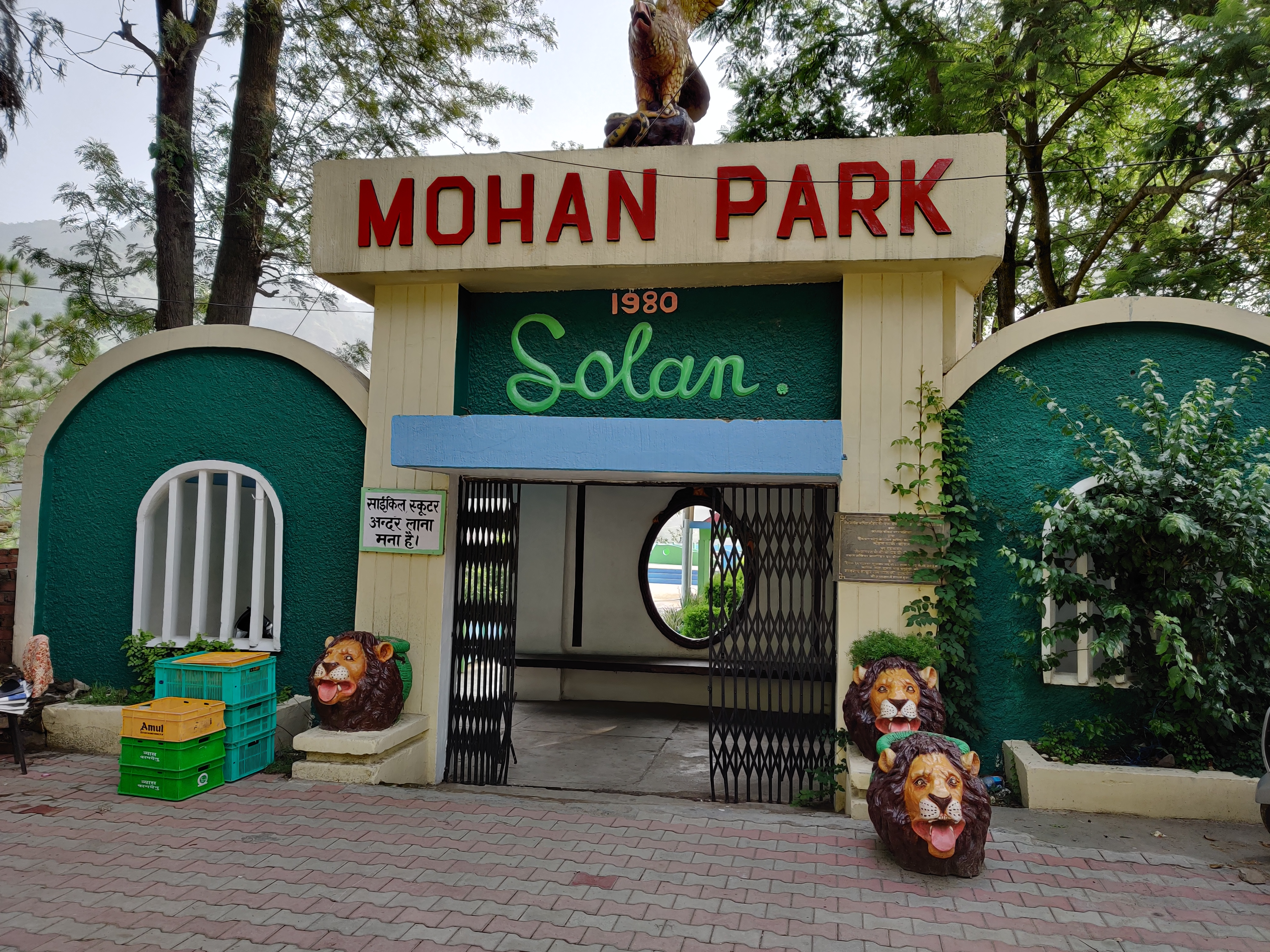

- Location within Himachal Pradesh Location within India
- Type: Urban park
- Location: Solan, Solan District, Himachal Pradesh
- Coordinates: 30.905°N 77.097°E
- Created: 1980
- Operator: Municipal Council Solan
- Open: Daily

The Mohan Park, is an urban park in the city of Solan in Himachal Pradesh, India. Located near Chambaghat, the City Park was opened in 1980 as a recreational area and a green lung for the city's residents.

== History ==
Built by Mohan Meakins Breweries, near Chambaghat on the mall road in 1980, it has a terrace garden, rides, green area and circular path around periphery.

== Attractions ==
The attraction of the park and surroundings:

- This park is popular among morning and evening walkers.
- In winter months people come to have sunshine.
- Favourite spot for families as children have playing area.
- Group meeting for senior citizens due to sitting area and clean air.
- Place for yoga enthusiasts.
- A place to unwind and relax

== Gallery ==
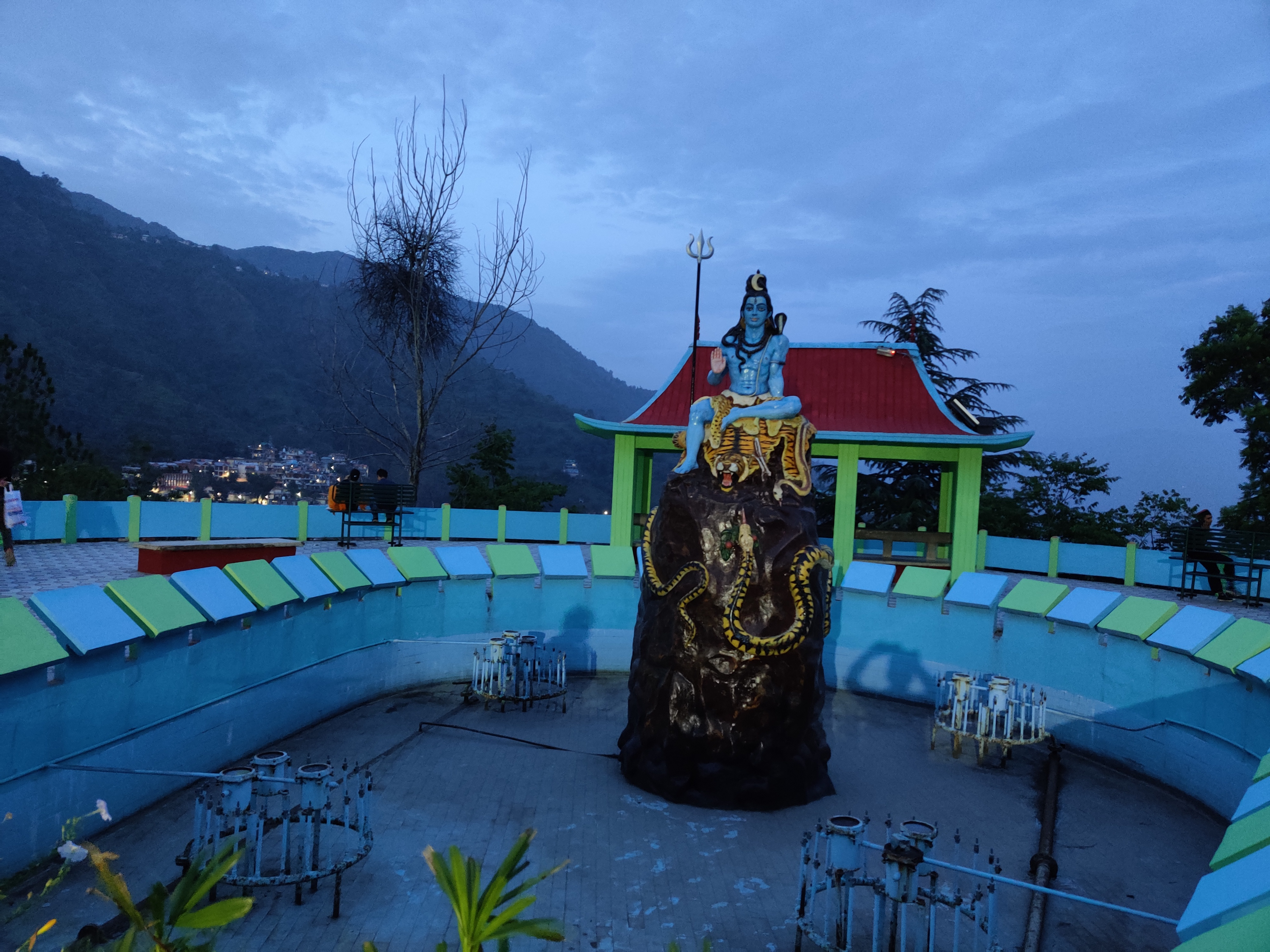
Shiv Statue at Mohan Park

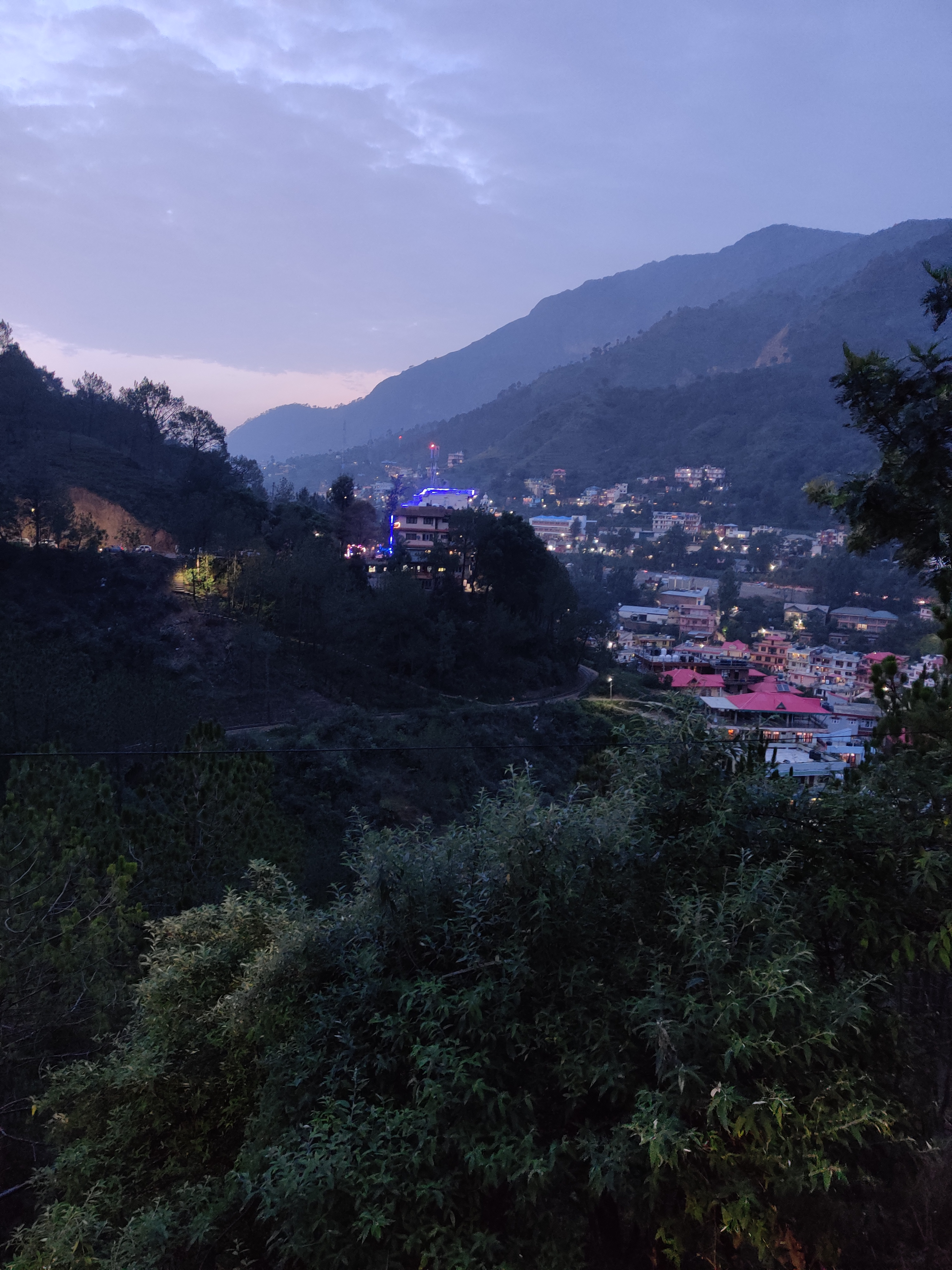
Solan in monsoon by twilight from Mohan Park

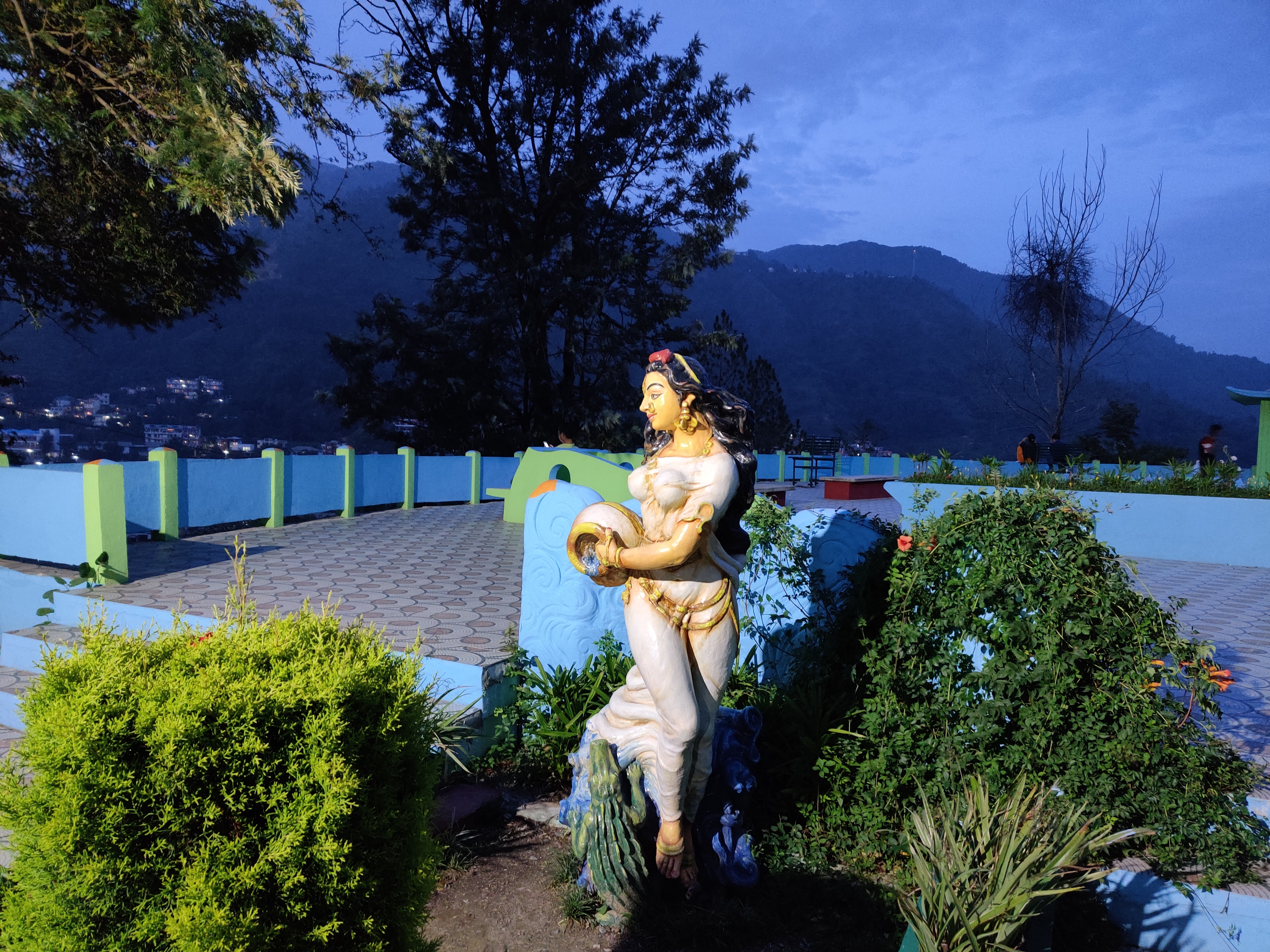
Himachal belle statue in Mohan Park

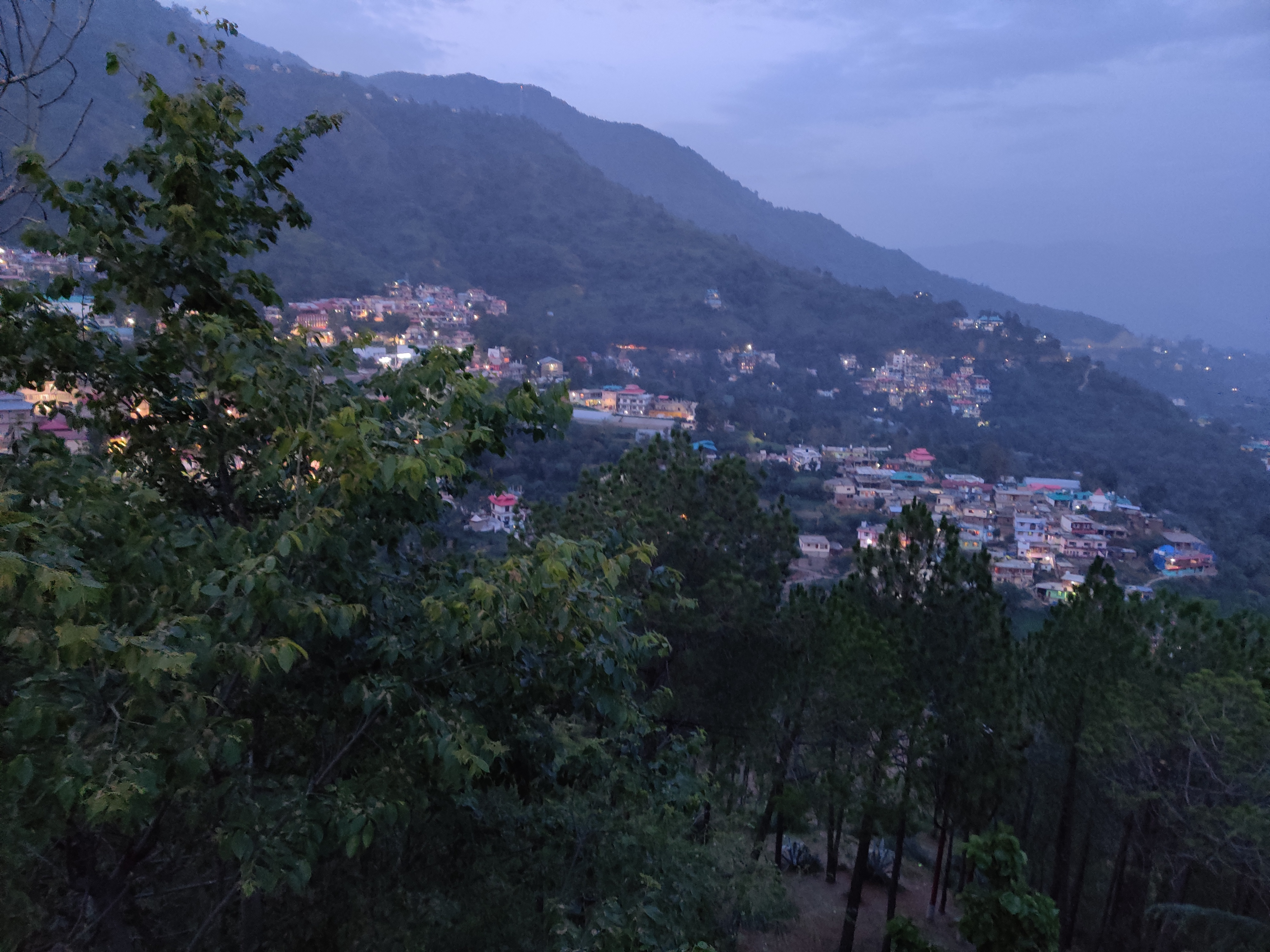
View of Solan towards Chambaghat from Mohan Park
