= Maa Shoolini =

Hindu goddess of victory

- Goddess of Victory
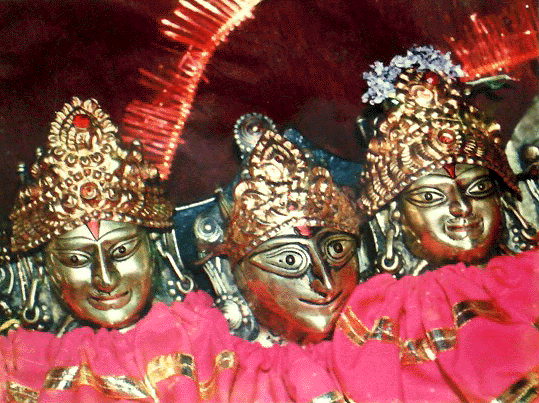
- Maa Shoolini
- Sanskrit transliteration: शूलिनी
- Affiliation: Devi, Durga, Parvati, Adi Parashakti
- Abode: Mount Meru, Mount Kailash
- Weapon: Trident, Discus, Conch, Bow, Arrow, Club, Scimitar
- Mount: Lion
- Consort: Shiva

Shoolini, (Sanskrit: शूलिनी) is the principal form of the Goddess Durga or Parvati, also known as Devi and Shakti.

== Legend ==
Jai shankar

It was the time when Vishnu took the form of Narasimha to save his devotee Prahlada. This was the 4th avatar of Vishnu. Narasimha was half-man and half-lion, having a human-like torso and lower body, with a lion-like face and claws.

Dedicated to the patron goddess of Solan i.e. Maa Shoolini, celebrated in the honor of Goddess Shoolini commemorates the three days visit of the Shoolini Devi to her elder sister. The citizens of Solan as well as the devotees alight here from neighbouring regions congregate at the Shoolini Devi Temple.
