= Taradevi railway station =

Railway station in India

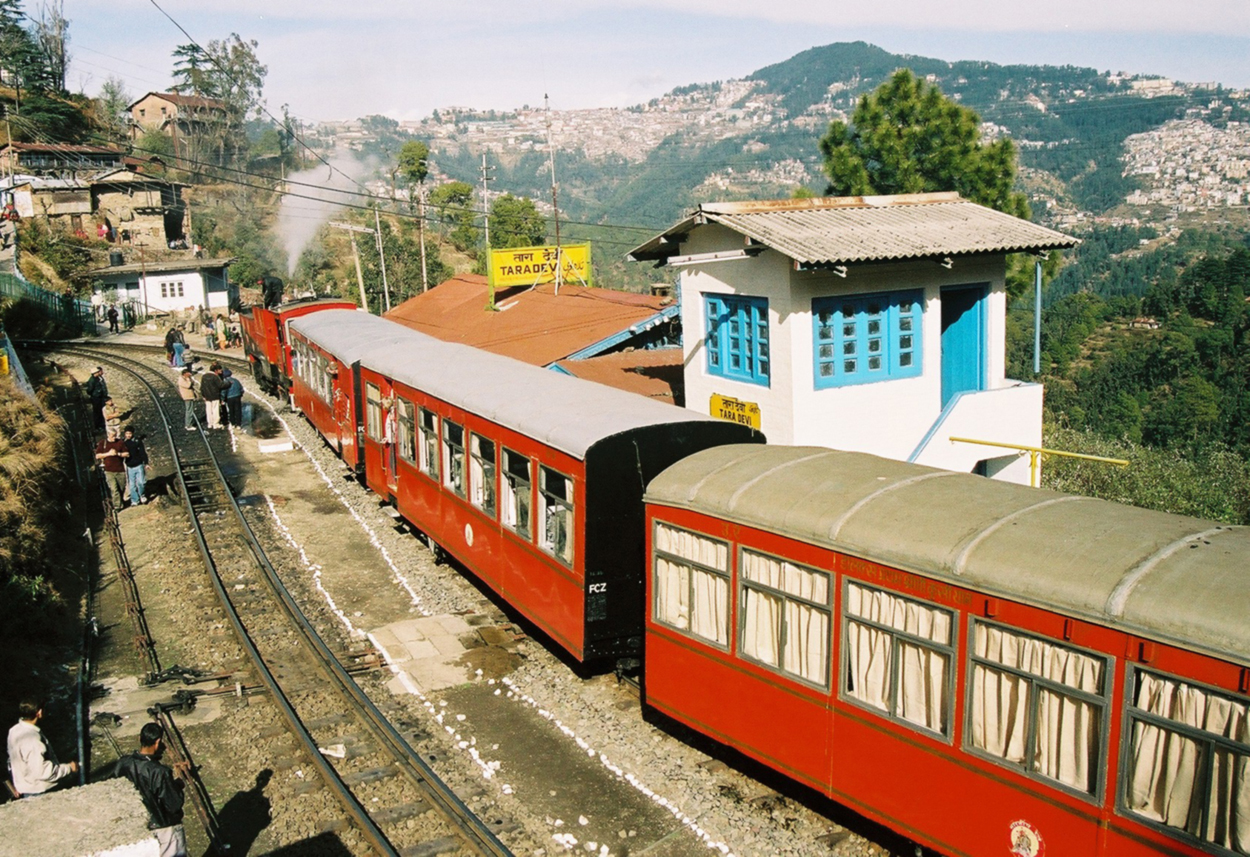
- A train at Taradevi station

General information
- Location: National Highway 5, Shimla, Himachal Pradesh; India
- Coordinates: 31.0760°N 77.1395°E
- Elevation: 1,849 metres (6,066 ft)
- System: Indian Railways station
- Owner: Indian Railways
- Operator: Ambala railway division
- Line: Kalka–Shimla Railway
- Platforms: 1
- Tracks: 2
- Connections: Auto stand

Construction
- Structure type: Standard (on-ground station)
- Parking: No
- Cycle facilities: No

Other information
- Status: Functioning
- Station code: TVI
- Fare zone: Northern Railway
Location
- Location within India Location within Himachal Pradesh

Taradevi railway station is a small railway station in the Shimla city in the Indian state of Himachal Pradesh. The station lies on UNESCO World Heritage Site Kalka–Shimla Railway. The station is located at an altitude of 1,849 metres (6066 ft) above mean sea level, 8 km from Shimla Railway Station 81 km from Kalka Railway Station. It has been allotted the railway code of TVI and it falls under the jurisdiction of Ambala railway division.

The name derives from Mata Tara Devi. The Sankat Mochan and Tara Devi temples are situated near this station. The third longest tunnel (No.91) at 992 metres (3,255 ft) is situated on the Shimla end of this station.

== Major trains ==
- Kalka Shimla NG Passenger
- Kalka Shimla Rail Motor
- Shivalik Deluxe Express
- Shimla Kalka Passenger

== See also ==
- Barog railway station
- Shimla railway station
- Kalka railway station
- Chandigarh Junction railway station
