= Solan railway station =

Railway station in Himachal Pradesh, India

Solan Railway Station
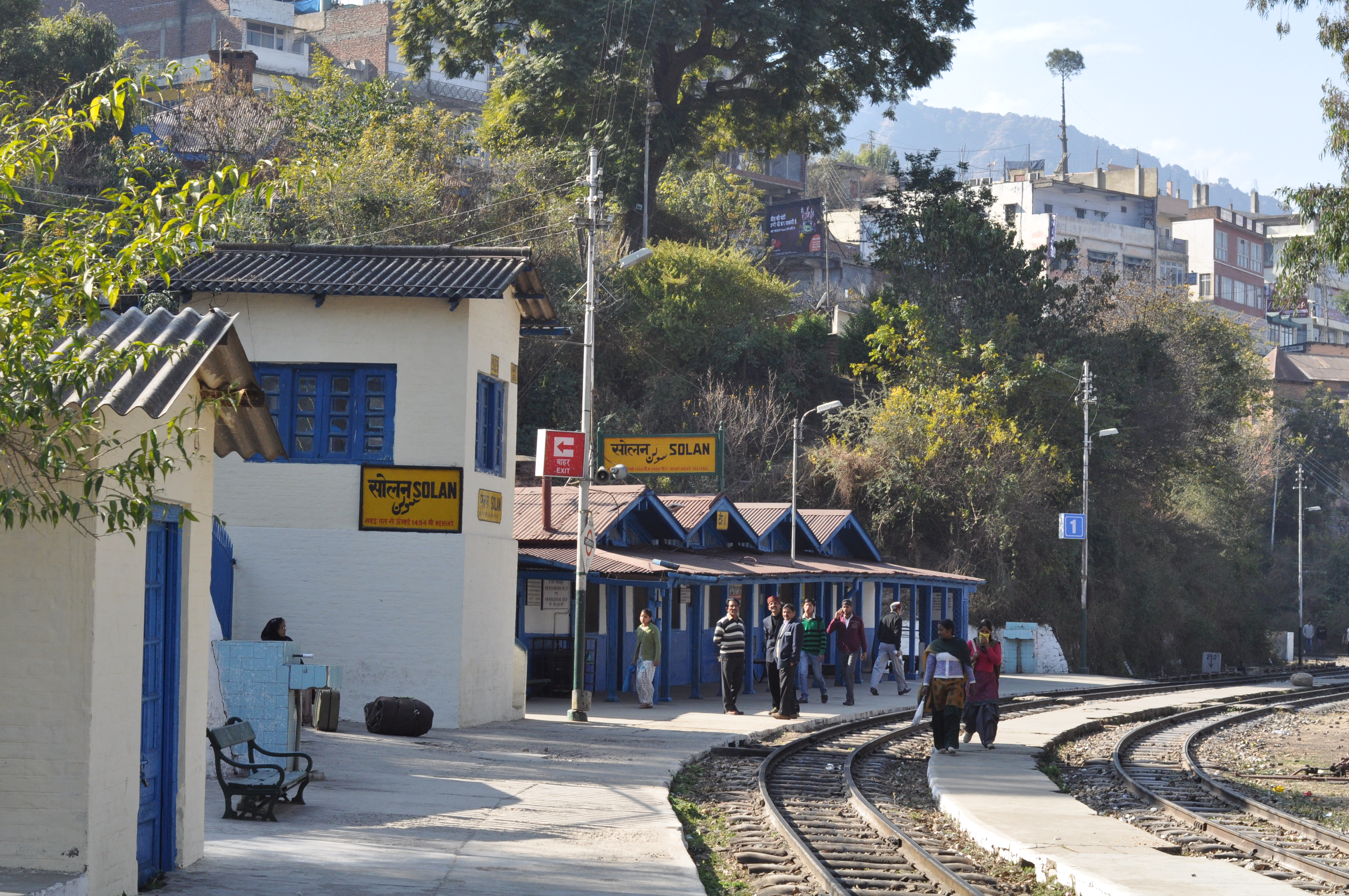
- Solan railway station

General information
- Location: NH 22, Solan, Himachal Pradesh; India
- Coordinates: 30.9084°N 77.0983°E
- Elevation: 1,502 metres (4,928 ft)
- System: Indian Railways station
- Owner: Indian Railways
- Line: Kalka–Shimla Railway
- Platforms: 2
- Tracks: 4 (Narrow Gauge)
- Connections: Auto stand

Construction
- Structure type: Standard (on-ground station)
- Parking: No
- Cycle facilities: No

Other information
- Status: Functioning
- Station code: SOL
- Zone(s): Northern Railway
- Division(s): Ambala

History
- Opened: 1903
Location
- Location within India Location within Himachal Pradesh

Solan Railway Station is a small railway station in Solan district in the Indian state of Himachal Pradesh. The station lies on UNESCO World Heritage Site Kalka–Shimla Railway. Solan railway station is located at an altitude of 1,502 metres (4,928 ft) above mean sea level. It was allotted the railway code of SOL under the jurisdiction of Ambala railway division. The 610 mm (2 ft)-wide narrow-gauge Kalka–Shimla Railway was constructed by Delhi–Ambala–Kalka Railway Company and opened for traffic in 1903. In 1905 the line was regauged to 762 mm (2 ft 6 in)-wide narrow gauge.

== Major trains ==
- Himalayan Queen
- Kalka–Shimla NG Passenger
- Shimla–Kalka Passenger
- Kalka–Shimla Rail Motor
- Shivalik Deluxe Express
- Shimla–Kalka Passenger

== See also ==
- Shimla railway station
- Barog railway station
- Kalka railway station
- Chandigarh Junction railway station
