= Kumarhatti Dagshai railway station =

Railway station in India

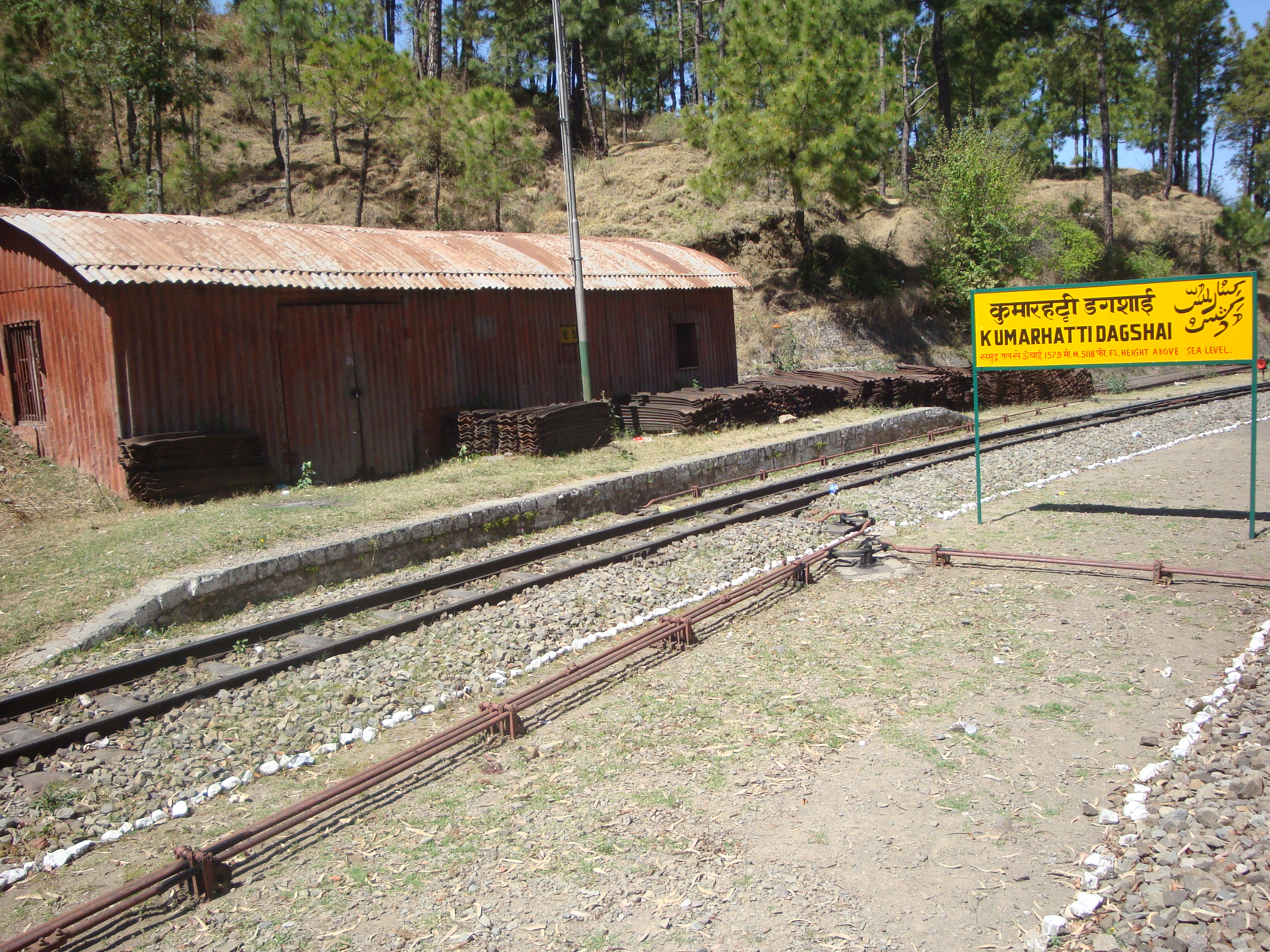
- Kumarhatti Dagshai Railway Station

General information
- Location: National Highway 5, Dagshai, Himachal Pradesh; India
- Coordinates: 30.88989°N 77.05508°E
- Elevation: 1,579 metres (5,180 ft)
- System: Indian Railways station
- Owner: Indian Railways
- Operator: Ambala railway division
- Line: Kalka–Shimla Railway
- Platforms: 1
- Tracks: 2
- Connections: Auto stand

Construction
- Structure type: Standard (on-ground station)
- Parking: No
- Cycle facilities: No

Other information
- Status: Functioning
- Station code: KMTI
- Fare zone: Northern Railway
Location
- Location within India Location within Himachal Pradesh

Kumarhatti Dagshai railway station is a small railway station in the Solan district in the Indian state of Himachal Pradesh. The station lies on UNESCO World Heritage Site Kalka–Shimla Railway. The station is located at an altitude of 1,579 metres (5180 ft) above mean sea level, 54 km from Shimla and 28 km from Kalka.
It has allotted the railway code of KMTI under the jurisdiction of Ambala railway division.

== Major trains ==
- Kalka Shimla NG Passenger
- Kalka Shimla Rail Motor
- Shivalik Deluxe Express
- Himalayan Queen
- Shimla Kalka Passenger

== Fossil site ==
This is one of the fossil sites of Himachal Pradesh where 20 million year old fossils from Miocene era have been discovered when this area was a coastal area of the Tethys Ocean.

== See also ==
- Barog railway station
- Shimla railway station
- Kalka railway station
- Chandigarh Junction railway station
