= Dharampur, Solan =

Dharampur Bathol Dharampur
- Town
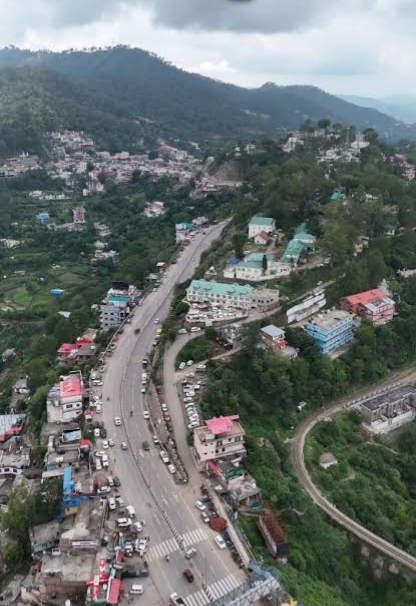
- Skyline of Dharampur

- Location within Himachal Pradesh
- Coordinates: 30.900°N 77.018°E
- Country: India
- State: Himachal Pradesh
- District: Solan

Languages
  - Official: Hindi
  - Regional: Mahasui (Baghati)
- Time zone: UTC+5:30 (IST)
- PIN: 173209
- S T D: 01792
- Vehicle registration: HP-

Dharampur, view from Dagshai side.

Dharampur is a town located in Solan district of Himachal Pradesh. It is located in Kasauli tehsil, about 65 km from Shimla and 15 km from Kasauli on the National Highway 22. It is also connected by the Kalka-Shimla Railway line, it also serves as the railway station. It houses the first tuberculosis sanatorium in North India. C R.P.F. (Central Reserve Police Force) camp on N.H. 22 on Shimla Road.

Dharampur is situated on the Chandigarh – Shimla Highway.(NH5) It is also connected to Kalka through toy train. The toy train is one of the narrow gauge trains and so is a tourist attraction also as Dharampur is located near to Kasauli and bus connectivity to Kasauli is majorly through Dharampur.
