= Barog =

- Hill Station
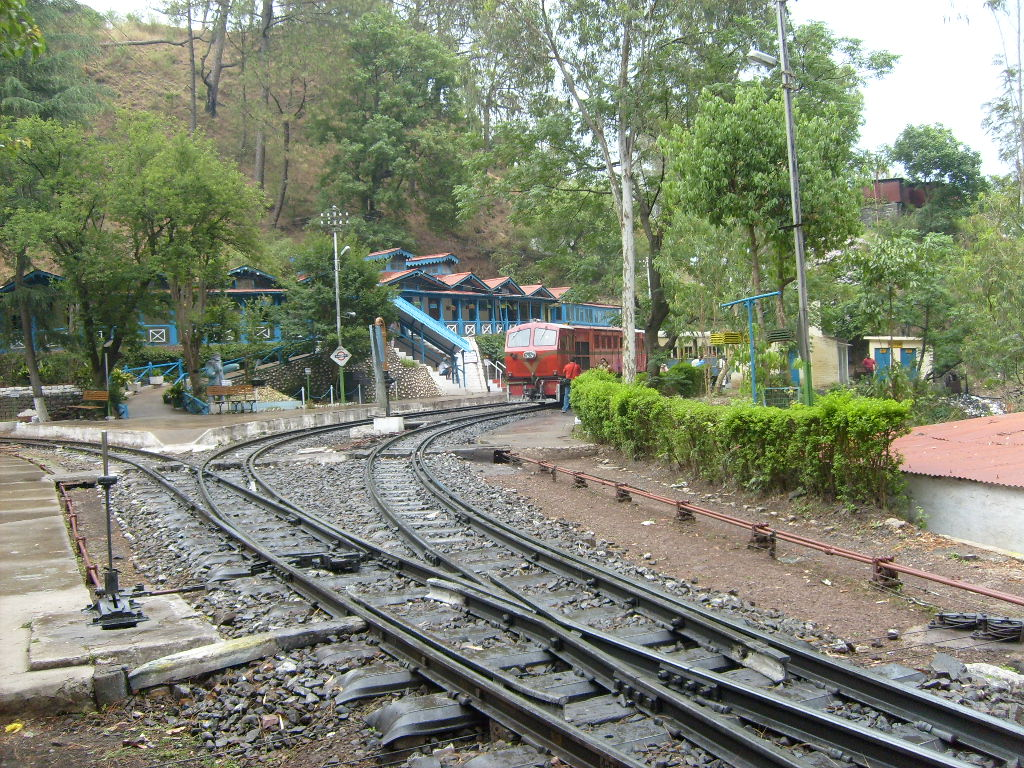
- Approaching train in Barog railway station

- Location in Himachal Pradesh, India Barog (India)
- Coordinates: 30.89°N 77.082°E
- Country: India
- State: Himachal Pradesh
- District: Solan
- Elevation: 1,860 m (6,100 ft)

Population (2001)
  - Total: 1,500

Languages
  - Official: Hindi
  - Regional: Mahasui (Baghati)
- Time zone: UTC+5:30 (IST)
- PIN: 174 101
- Telephone code: 91-1792
- Vehicle registration: HP-14

Barog is a hill station, near City of Solan in Solan district in the Indian state of Himachal Pradesh. The station lies on UNESCO World Heritage Site, the Kalka–Shimla Railway. Set in the mountains Barog is just 60 km (37 mi) from Chandigarh on the Kalka-Shimla highway.

== History ==
Barog was settled in the early 20th century during the building of the narrow gauge Kalka-Shimla Railway. Currently many residents have their long stays in their houses and flats in Barog. It used to be an important stop in the early decades of the century when the Kalka-Shimla toy train stopped here for an hour while the sahibs and memsahibs enjoyed a lavish lunch.

== Geography ==
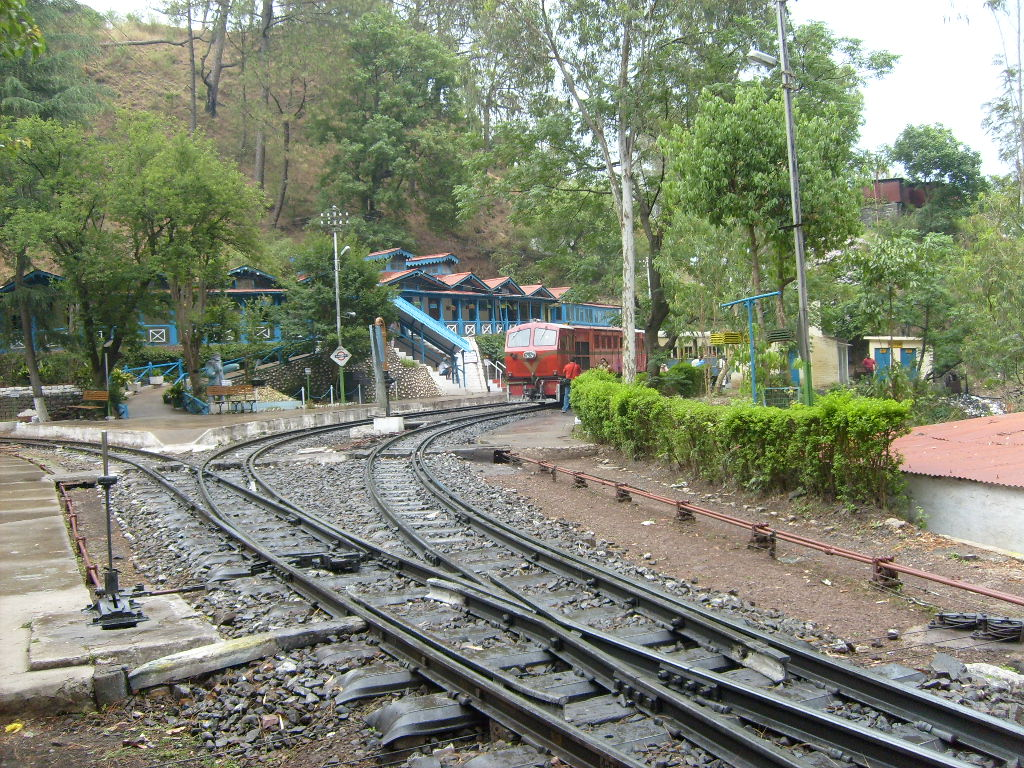
Kalka-Shimla Railway - Barog

Barog is located at 30°53′24″N 77°4′55″E at a distance of 60 km (37 mi) from Chandigarh. Shimla, the capital city of Himachal Pradesh is another 65 km (40 mi) from Barog.

Until 2003, National Highway 22 connecting Chandigarh with Shimla passed through Barog. On 6 December 2003, the new section of the highway was inaugurated that would connect the village of Kumarhatti directly to Solan, thus bypassing Barog. This was done to avoid the steep incline to Barog from Kumarhatti.

Barog is located at a height of 1,560 metres (5,120 ft) above the mean sea level. Due to its height, temperatures here range between 23 and 10 °C (73 and 50 °F) during summers and between 15 and 5 °C (59 and 41 °F) during winters. The summers last from April to July. Winters set in during December and typically last up to February.

== Economy ==
The economy of Barog is primarily dependent upon tourists, who come here because of its cool climate and proximity to Chandigarh. Many hotels including Hotel KorInns and a Himachal tourism resort called Pinewood operate in Barog. Barog is also influenced economically by the nearby Lawrence School, Sanawar.

The local economy mainly depends on the agriculture and especially on tomato growing. Until 1975 the local populace was mostly illiterate, which resulted in stalled economic progress.

Barog also serves as a fitness camp for the Indian National Hockey and other athletic teams.

== Barog Tunnel ==
Steam Train Leaving Tunnel

Barog tunnel is the longest of the 103 operational tunnels on the route of the UNESCO heritage Kalka-Shimla railway, which is 1,144 metres (3,752 ft) long. Barog station is immediately after the tunnel. Trains take about 2.5 minutes to cross this tunnel, running at 25 km/h (16 mph) per hour.

== In the news ==
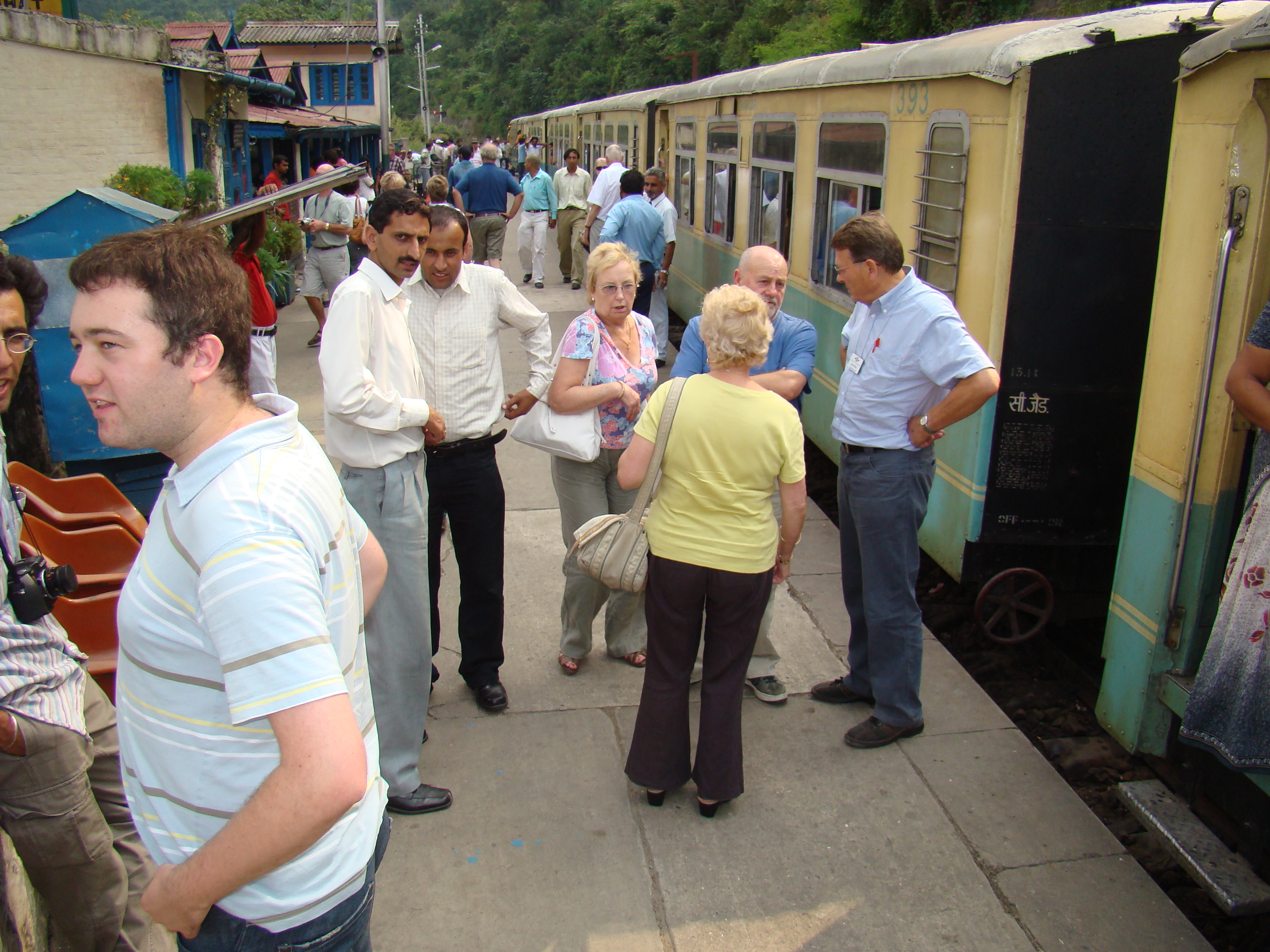
The train at Barog Station.

Barog station was filmed in Himalaya with Michael Palin in 2004 and on CNN in Season 3 Episode 1, "Punjab, India" of Anthony Bourdain: Parts Unknown during Anthony Bourdain's journey on the Kalka–Shimla Railway.
