= Shoghi railway station =

Railway station in Himachal Pradesh

Shoghi
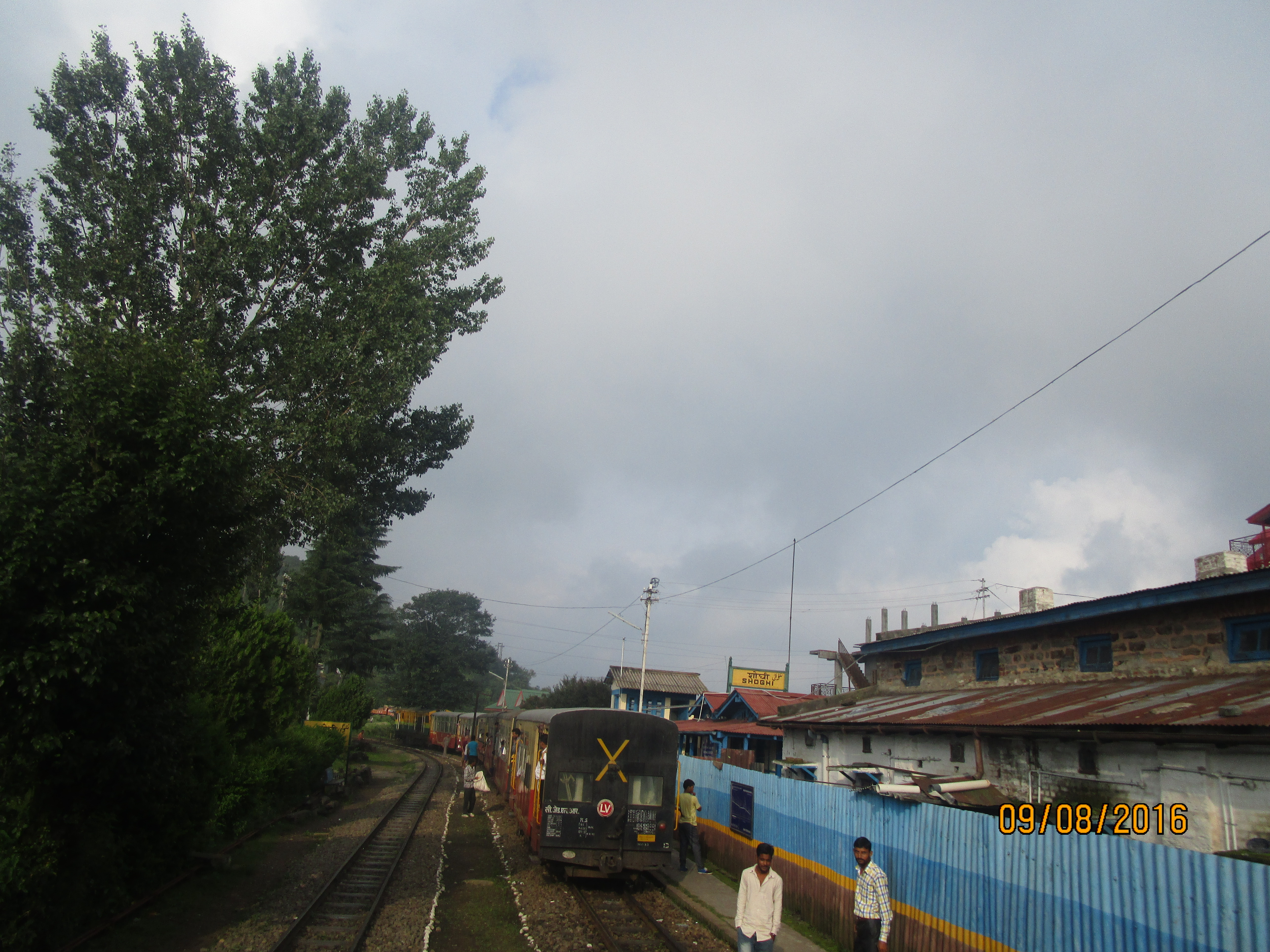
- Shoghi Railway Station with passing train

General information
- Location: Shoghi; Himachal Pradesh; India
- Coordinates: 31.0391°N 77.1249°E
- Elevation: 1,833 m (6,014 ft)
- Owner: Northern Railway Zone
- Line: Kalka–Shimla Railway
- Platforms: 1
- Tracks: 1
- Bus stands: Shoghi Bazaar
Location
- Location of Shoghi Railway Station in Shimla

Shoghi railway station is a railway station serving Shoghi suburb near Shimla, Himachal Pradesh in India. It is on the Kalka–Shimla Railway and under the Ambala railway division of Northern Railway zone of Indian Railways.

It is located 1,833 metres above sea level and has two platforms. As of July 2019 every day 5 trains used to stop here.
