= Dharampur Himachal railway station =

Railway station in Himachal Pradesh

Dharampur Himachal Station
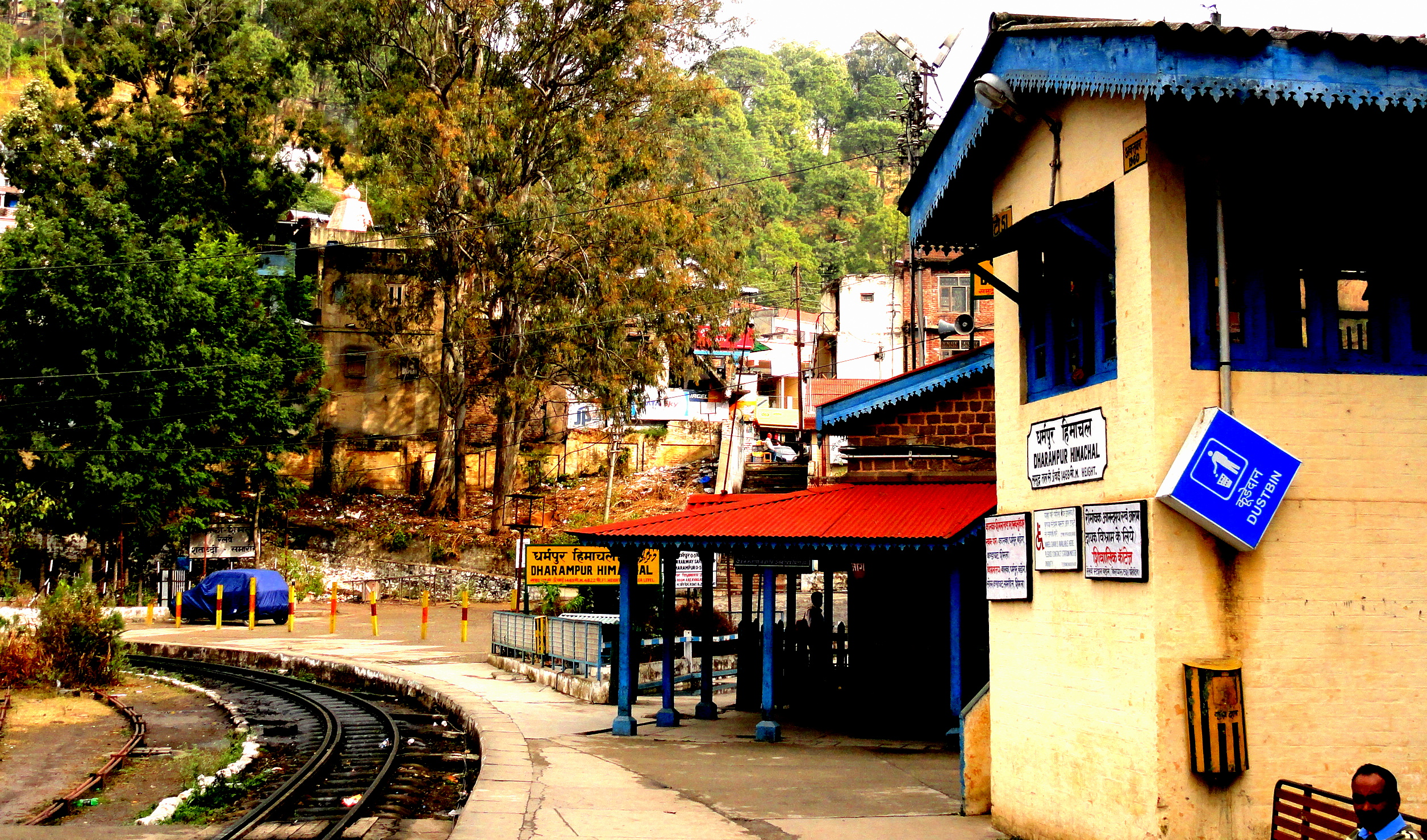
- A view of the Dharampur railway station

General information
- Location: National Highway 22, Dharampur, Himachal Pradesh; India
- Coordinates: 30.9000°N 77.0238°E
- Elevation: 1,482 metres (4,862 ft)
- System: Indian Railways station
- Owner: Indian Railways
- Operator: Ambala railway division
- Line: Kalka–Shimla Railway
- Platforms: 1
- Tracks: 2 (narrow gauge)
- Connections: Auto stand

Construction
- Structure type: Standard (on-ground station)
- Parking: No
- Cycle facilities: No

Other information
- Status: Functioning
- Station code: DMP
- Fare zone: Northern Railway

History
- Opened: 1903
Location
- Location within India Location within Himachal Pradesh

Dharampur Himachal Railway Station is a small railway station in Dharampur town in Solan district in the Indian state of Himachal Pradesh. The station lies on UNESCO World Heritage Site Kalka–Shimla Railway. Dharmpur railway station is located at an altitude of 1,482 metres (4,862 ft) above mean sea level. It was allotted the railway code of DMP under the jurisdiction of Ambala railway division. The 610 mm (2 ft) narrow-gauge Kalka–Shimla Railway was constructed by Delhi–Ambala–Kalka Railway Company and opened for traffic in 1903. In 1905 the line was regauged to 762 mm (2 ft 6 in) gauge.

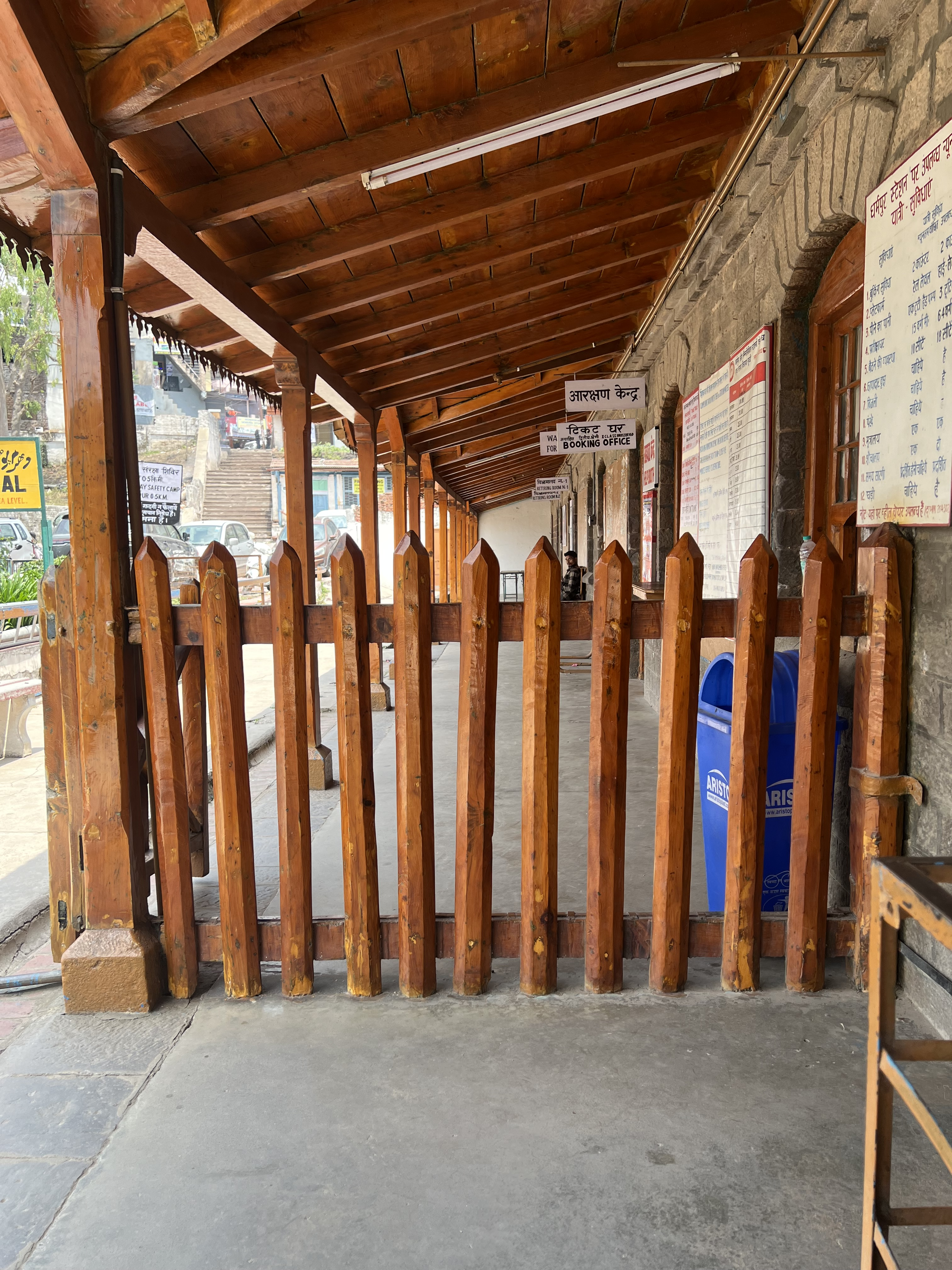
UNESCO world heritage site kalka shimla railway Dharampur Railway station

== Trains ==
- Kalka Shimla NG Passenger
- Kalka Shimla Rail Motor
- Shivalik Deluxe Express
- Himalayan Queen
- Shimla Kalka Passenger
