= Barog railway station =

Railway station in India

Barog Railway Station
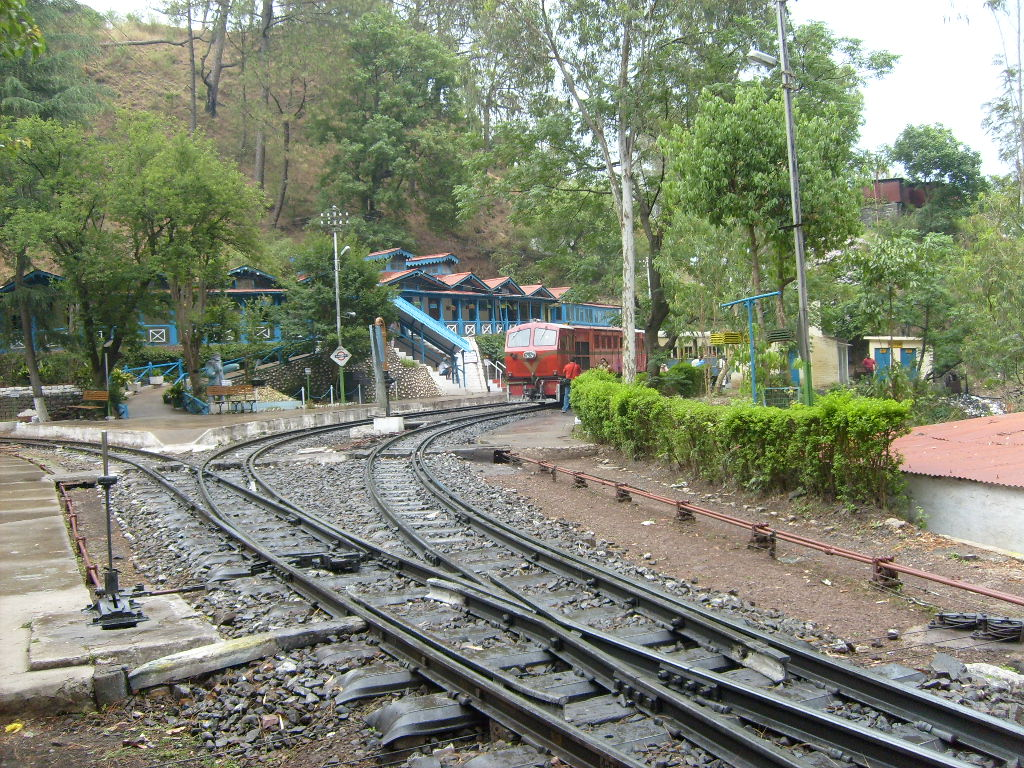
- Barog railway station

General information
- Location: National Highway 22, Barog, Himachal Pradesh; India
- Coordinates: 30.8902°N 77.0821°E
- Elevation: 1,552 metres (5,092 ft)
- System: Indian Railways station
- Owner: Indian Railways
- Operator: Ambala railway division
- Line: Kalka–Shimla Railway
- Platforms: 2
- Tracks: 4
- Connections: Auto stand

Construction
- Structure type: Standard (on-ground station)
- Parking: No
- Cycle facilities: No

Other information
- Status: Functioning
- Station code: BOF
- Fare zone: Northern Railway

History
- Opened: 1903
Location
- Location within India Location within Himachal Pradesh

Barog Railway Station is a small railway station in the Solan district in the Indian state of Himachal Pradesh. The station lies on UNESCO World Heritage Site Kalka–Shimla Railway. The station is located at an altitude of 1,531 metres (5,023 ft) above mean sea level, 42.14 km from Kalka.

It has been allotted the railway code of BOF under the jurisdiction of Ambala railway division.

The original 610 mm (2 ft) wide narrow-gauge Kalka–Shimla Railway was constructed by Delhi–Ambala–Kalka Railway Company and opened for traffic in 1903. The line was later regauged to 762 mm (2 ft 6 in)-wide narrow gauge.

Many Bollywood movies have scenes featuring Barog railway station, including recent films Metro... In Dino and All Izz Well.

== Major trains ==
- Kalka Shimla NG Passenger
- Kalka Shimla Rail Motor
- Shivalik Deluxe Express
- Himalayan Queen
- Shimla Kalka Passenger

== See also ==
- Solan railway station
- Shimla railway station
- Kalka railway station
- Chandigarh Junction railway station
