= Kalka–Shimla Railway =

Heritage rail line in North India

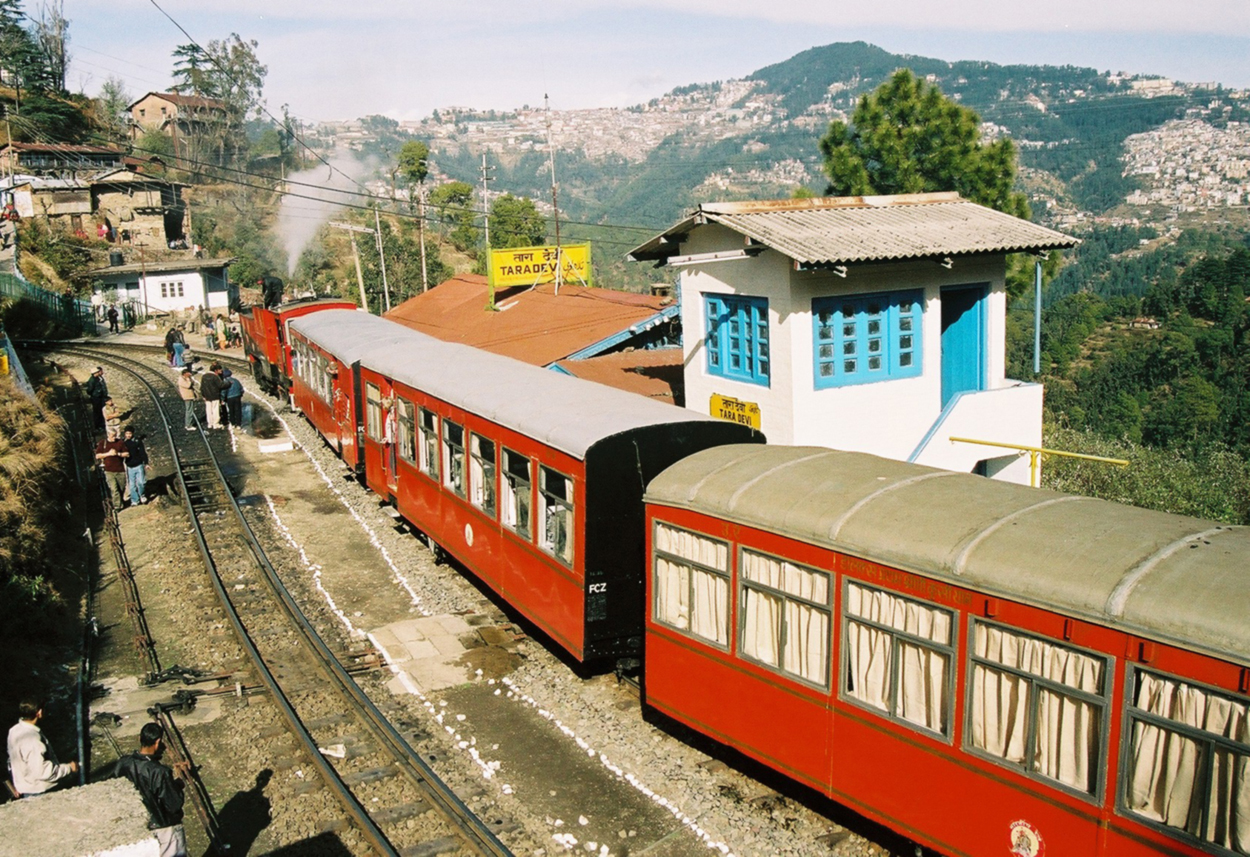
- At the Taradevi station
- Terminus: Shimla

Commercial operations
- Built by: Herbert Septimus Harington (20 April 1855 – 11 November 1913)

Preserved operations
- Operated by: Northern Railway
- Stations: 18
- Length: 96.60 km (60.02 mi)
- Preserved gauge: 2 ft 6 in (762 mm)

Commercial history
- Opened: 1903; 123 years ago

Preservation history
- Headquarters: Shimla
- Location within India

UNESCO World Heritage Site
- Location: Himachal Pradesh, India
- Part of: Mountain Railways of India
- Criteria: Cultural: (ii)(iv)
- Reference: 944ter-003
- Inscription: 1999 (23rd Session)
- Extensions: 2005, 2008
- Area: 79.06 ha (0.3053 sq mi)
- Buffer zone: 74.88 ha (0.2891 sq mi)
- Coordinates: 30°51′8″N 76°56′15″E

The Kalka–Shimla Railway is a 2 ft 6 in (762 mm) narrow-gauge railway in North India which traverses a mostly mountainous route from Kalka to Shimla. It is known for its scenic views of the surrounding hills and villages. The railway was built under the direction of Herbert Septimus Harington between 1898 and 1903 to connect Shimla, the summer capital of India during the British Raj, with the rest of the Indian rail system.

Its early locomotives were manufactured by Sharp, Stewart and Company. Larger locomotives were introduced, which were manufactured by the Hunslet Engine Company. Diesel and diesel-hydraulic locomotives began operation in 1955 and 1970, respectively.

On 8 July 2008, UNESCO added the Kalka–Shimla Railway to the mountain railways of India World Heritage Site.

== History ==
Shimla (then spelt Simla), which was settled by the British shortly after the first Anglo-Gurkha war, is located at 7,116 feet (2,169 m) in the foothills of the Himalayas. The idea of connecting Shimla by rail was first raised by a correspondent to the Delhi gazette in November 1847.

Shimla became the summer capital of British India in 1864, and was the headquarters of the Indian army. This meant that twice a year it was necessary to transfer the entire government between Calcutta and Shimla by horse and ox drawn carts.

In 1891 the 5 ft 6 in (1,676 mm) broad gauge Delhi–Kalka line opened, which made the construction of a branch line up to Shimla feasible.

The earliest survey was made in 1884, followed by another survey in 1885. Based on these two surveys, a project report was submitted in 1887 to the government of British India. Fresh surveys were made in 1892 and 1893, which led to four alternative schemes being suggested — two adhesion lines, 67.25 and 69.75 mi (108.23 and 112.25 km) long, and two rack lines. Fresh surveys were again made in 1895 from Kalka to Solan to determine whether a 1 in 12 rack or a 1 in 25 adhesion line should be chosen. After much debate, an adhesion line was chosen in preference to a rack system.

Construction of the Kalka–Shimla Railway on 2 ft (610 mm) narrow-gauge tracks was begun by the privately funded Delhi-Ambala-Kalka Railway Company following the signing of a contract between the secretary of state and the company on 29 June 1898. The contract specified that the line would be built without any financial aid or guarantee from the government. The government however provided the land free of charge to the company. The estimated cost of 8,678,500 rupees doubled by the time the line was opened. The Chief Engineer of the project was Herbert Septimus Harington and the Chief Contractor was Sujan Singh Hadaliwale.

The 95.68 km (59.45 mi) line opened for traffic on 9 November 1903 and was dedicated by Viceroy Lord Curzon. This line was further extended from Shimla to Shimla Goods (which had once housed the bullock cart office) on 27 June 1909 making it 96.60 km (60.02 mi).

The Indian Army were sceptical about the two feet gauge chosen for the line and requested that a wider standard gauge be used for mountain and light strategic railways. Eventually the government agreed that the gauge was too narrow for was essentially a capital city and for military purposes. As a result, the contract with the railway company was revised on 15 November 1901 and the line gauge changed to 2 ft 6 in (762 mm) with the track built to date being regauged. Some sources however state the regauging wasn't undertaken until 1905.

In 1905 the company took delivery of a 10-ton Cowans Sheldon travelling crane to assist with lifting rolling stock back onto the tracks after accidents and for general track maintenance. Due to the high capital and maintenance costs and difficult working conditions, the railway was allowed to charge higher fares than on other lines. Nevertheless, the company had spent 16,525,000 rupees by 1904 with no sign of the line becoming profitable, which lead to it being purchased by the government on 1 January 1906 for 17,107,748 rupees. Once it came under the control of the government the line was originally managed as an independent unit from the North West Railway office in Lahore until 1926, when it was transferred to Delhi Division. Since July 1987, the line has been managed by the Ambala Division from Ambala Cantt.

In 2007, the Himachal Pradesh government declared the railway a heritage property. For about a week, beginning on 11 September 2007, a UNESCO team visited the railway to inspect it for possible selection as a World Heritage Site. On 8 July 2008, it became part of the mountain railways of India World Heritage Site with the Darjeeling Himalayan and Nilgiri Mountain Railways.

During the 2023 North India floods, several sections of the line were washed out by landslides.

== Technical details ==
The track has 20 picturesque stations, 103 tunnels (102 currently active), 912 curves, 969 bridges and 3% slope (1:80 gradient). The 1,143.61 m (3,752.0 ft) tunnel at Barog immediately before the Barog station is longest, the longest bridge is 60 ft (18 m) the sharpest curve has a 123 ft (37 m) radius of curvature. The railway line originally used 42 lb/yd (20.8 kg/m) rail, which was later replaced with 60 lb/yd (29.8 kg/m) rail. The train has an average speed of 25–30 km/h (16–19 mph) but the railcar is almost 50–60 km/h (31–37 mph). Both the train and railcar are equipped with vistadomes.

The temperature range and annual rainfall are 0–45 °C (32–113 °F) and 200–250 cm (6.6–8.2 ft), respectively.

== Operators ==
The KSR and its assets, including the stations, line and vehicles, belong to the government of India under the Ministry of Railways. The Northern Railway handles day-to-day maintenance and management, and several programs, divisions and departments of Indian Railways are responsible for repairs.

== Route ==
The route winds from a height of 656 metres (2,152 ft) at Kalka in the Himalayan Shivalik Hills foothills, past Dharampur, Solan, Kandaghat, Taradevi, Barog, Salogra, Totu (Jutogh) and Summerhill, to Shimla at an altitude of 2,075 metres (6,808 ft). The difference in height between the two ends of line is 1,419 metres (4,656 ft).

=== Stations ===
The alignment of the railway route from south to north, along the NH-5 on highway's western side till north of Jabli (Koti) and then on eastern side, is as follows.

Station	Milepost	Height above sea level	Description
Kalka	0 km (0 mi)	656 m (2,152 ft)	It derived its name from Kali Mata temple located at the Shimla end of the town. It is home to a diesel shed as well as a workshop to service the narrow gauge engines and carriages of the Kalka-Shimla line.
Taksal	5.69 km (3.54 mi)	806 m (2,644 ft)	First station after entering Himachal got the name because it was the place where coins were made in ancient time.
Gumman	10.41 km (6.47 mi)	940 m (3,080 ft)	An isolated station in Kasauli hills, though Sonwara is the closest train station to Kasauli.
Koti (Jabli)	16.23 km (10.08 mi)	1,098 m (3,602 ft)	This station is also known as the jabli railway station. The station is often visited by wild animals. The second longest tunnel (No. 10) with a length of 693.72 metres (2,276 ft 0 in) is situated near this station. In August, 2007 a heavy downpour washed away part of the station building and track.
Sonwara	26 km (16 mi)	1,334 m (4,377 ft)	The historic residential The Lawrence School at Sanawar is 6 km (3.7 mi) away. The longest bridge (No.226) on the line with an overall length of 97.40 metres (319 ft 7 in) and height of 19.31 metres (63 ft 4 in) is situated near this station. This services the Kasauli Brewery and Kasauli hill station which are 9.3 kilometres (5.8 mi) and 11 kilometres (6.8 mi) away respectively.
Dharampur	32.14 km (19.97 mi)	1,469 m (4,820 ft)	This services the Kasauli hill station which is 13 kilometres (8.1 mi) away. The Engineer's Bungalow (MP 33 km (21 mi)) which was the official residence of the engineer in charge of this section of the line until the late 1960s was converted into the Northern Railway Safety Institute.
Kumarhati (Dagshai)	39 km (24 mi)	1,579 m (5,180 ft)	This isolated station serviced the Dagshai military cantonment.
Barog	42.14 km (26.18 mi)	1,531 m (5,023 ft)	The longest tunnel (No.33) with a length of 1,143.61 metres (3,752 ft 0 in) is situated close to the Kalka side of the station.
Solan	46.10 km (28.65 mi)	1,429 m (4,688 ft)	The National Institute of Research on Mushroom Farming and Solan Agriculture University is situated nearby.
Salogra	52.70 km (32.75 mi)	1,509 m (4,951 ft)	The famous Solan Brewery is just a few kilometres away from Salogra station.
Kandaghat	58.24 km (36.19 mi)	1,433 m (4,701 ft)	Arch bridge No. 493 with a length of 32 metres (105 ft) is situated here.
Kanoh	69.42 km (43.14 mi)	1,647 m (5,404 ft)	The highest arch gallery bridge (No.541) with a height of 23 metres (75 ft 6 in) and length of 54.8 metres (179 ft 9 in) is situated here.
Kathleeghat	72.23 km (44.88 mi)	1,701 m (5,581 ft)	It is the last station of Shimla district.
Shoghi	77.81 km (48.35 mi)	1,832 m (6,010 ft)	Shoghi is the first station of Shimla district.
Taradevi	84.64 km (52.59 mi)	1,936 m (6,352 ft)	The name derives from Mata Tara Devi. The Sankat Mochan and Tara Devi temples are situated near this station. The third longest tunnel (No.91) at 992 metres (3,255 ft) is situated on the Shimla end of this station.
Jutogh	89.41 km (55.56 mi)	1,958 m (6,424 ft)	This suburb station of Shimla, once served as the transit point for Jutogh Military Cantonment.
Summer Hill	92.93 km (57.74 mi)	2,042 m (6,699 ft)	This suburb station of Shimla originally serviced the Viceregal Lodge. The Himachal Pradesh University is situated near the station.
Shimla	95.60 km (59.40 mi)	2,075 m (6,808 ft)	This beautiful station is just below the old bus stand in Shimla.

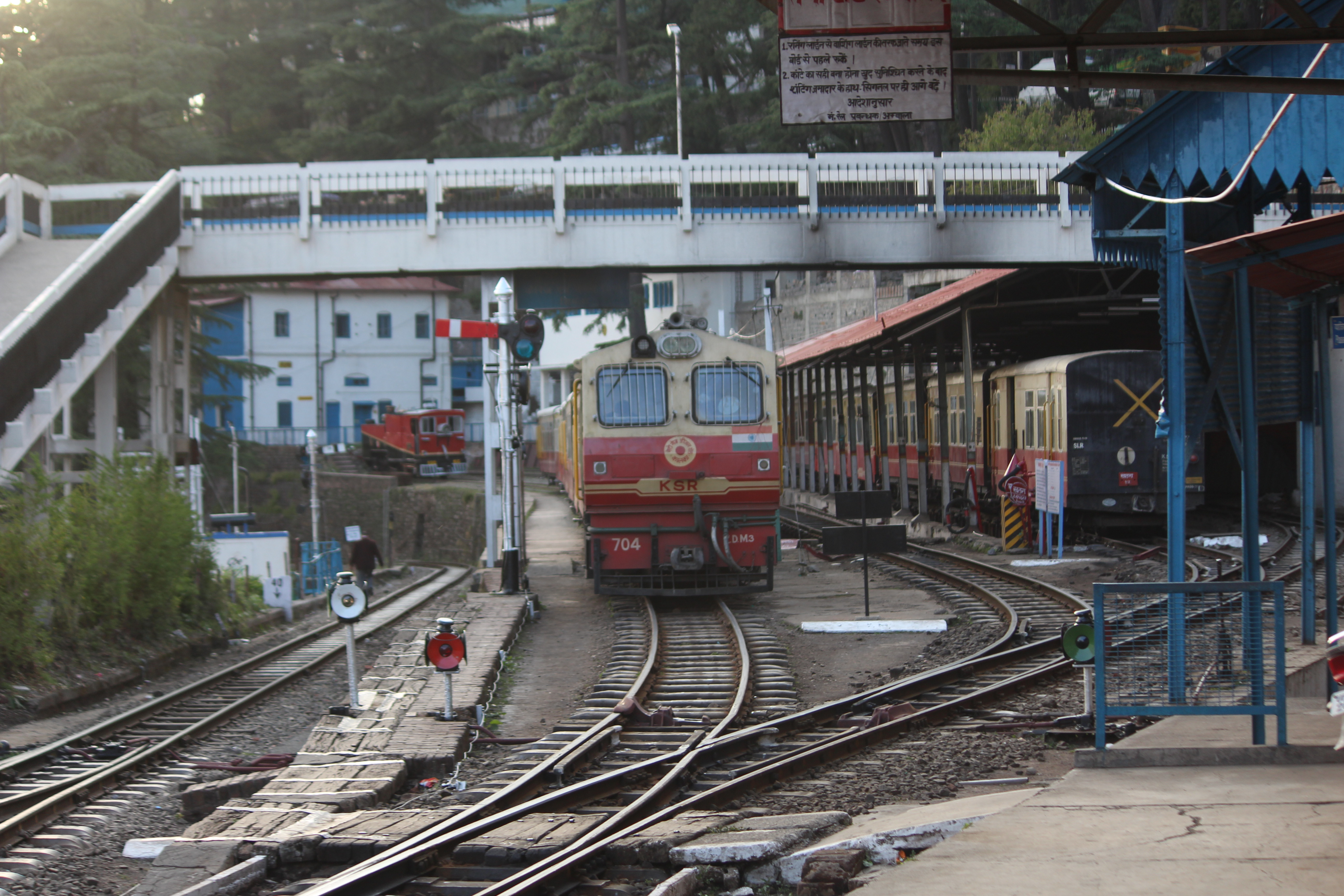
Shimla

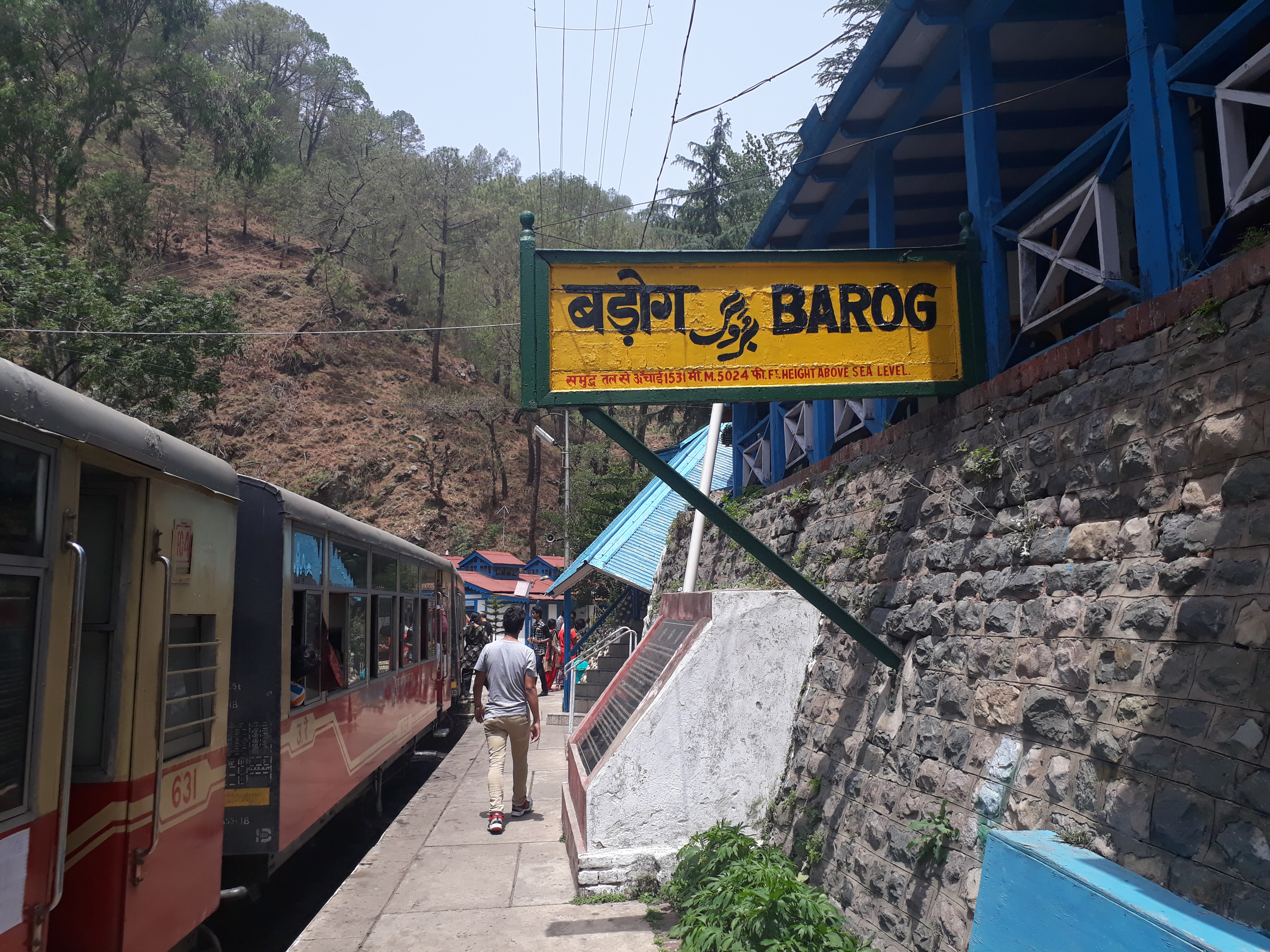
Barog

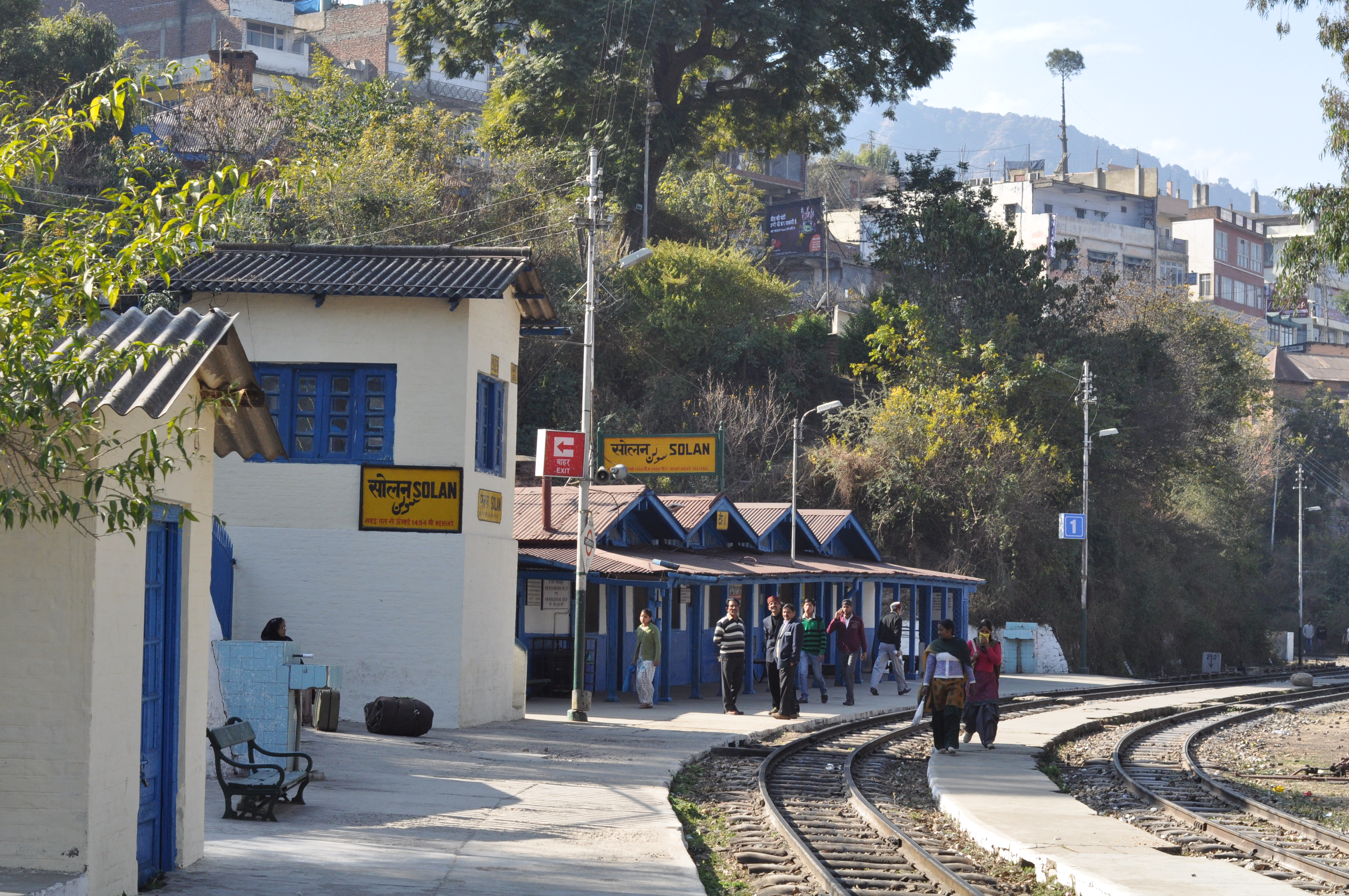
Solan

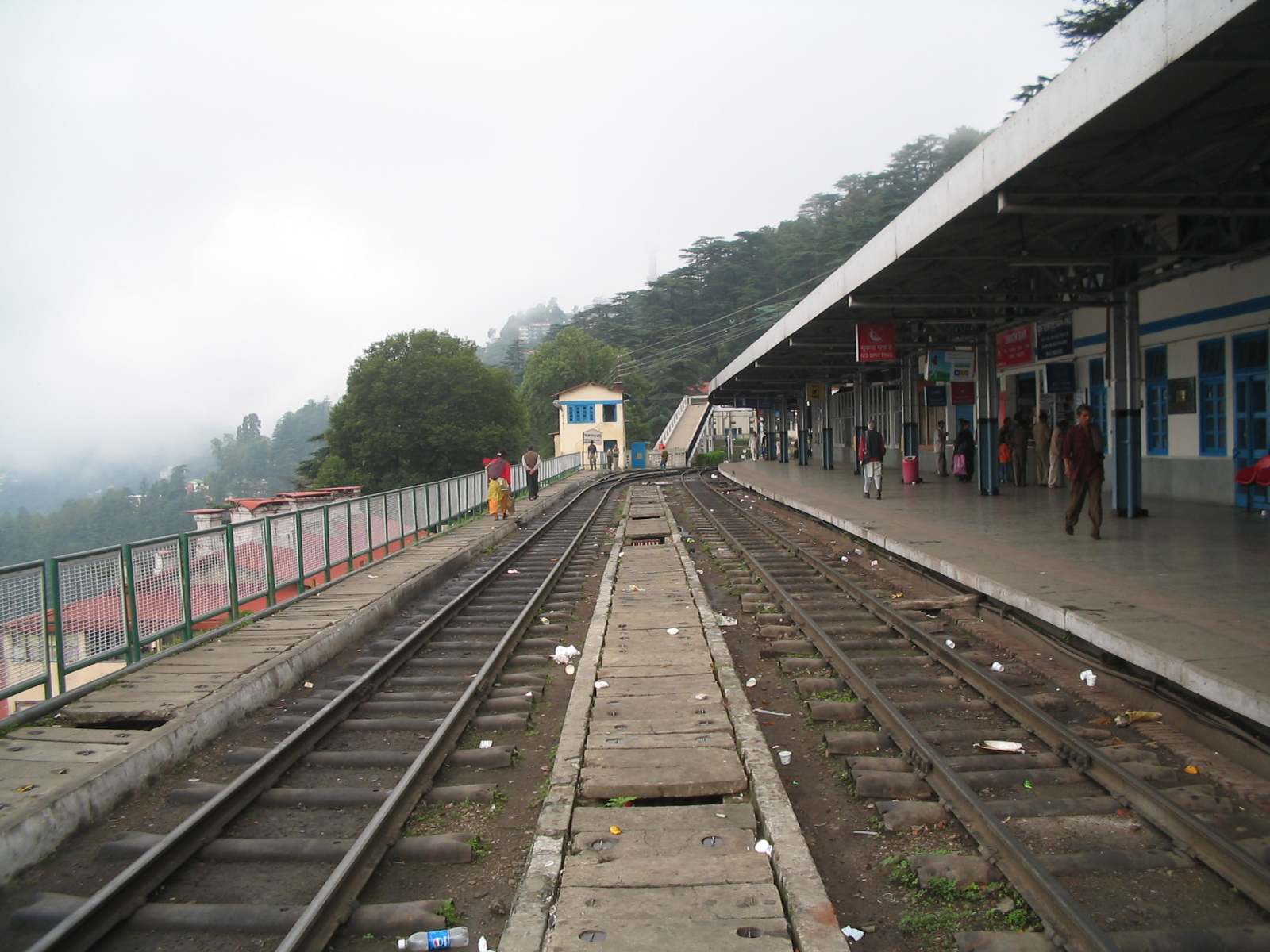
Shimla

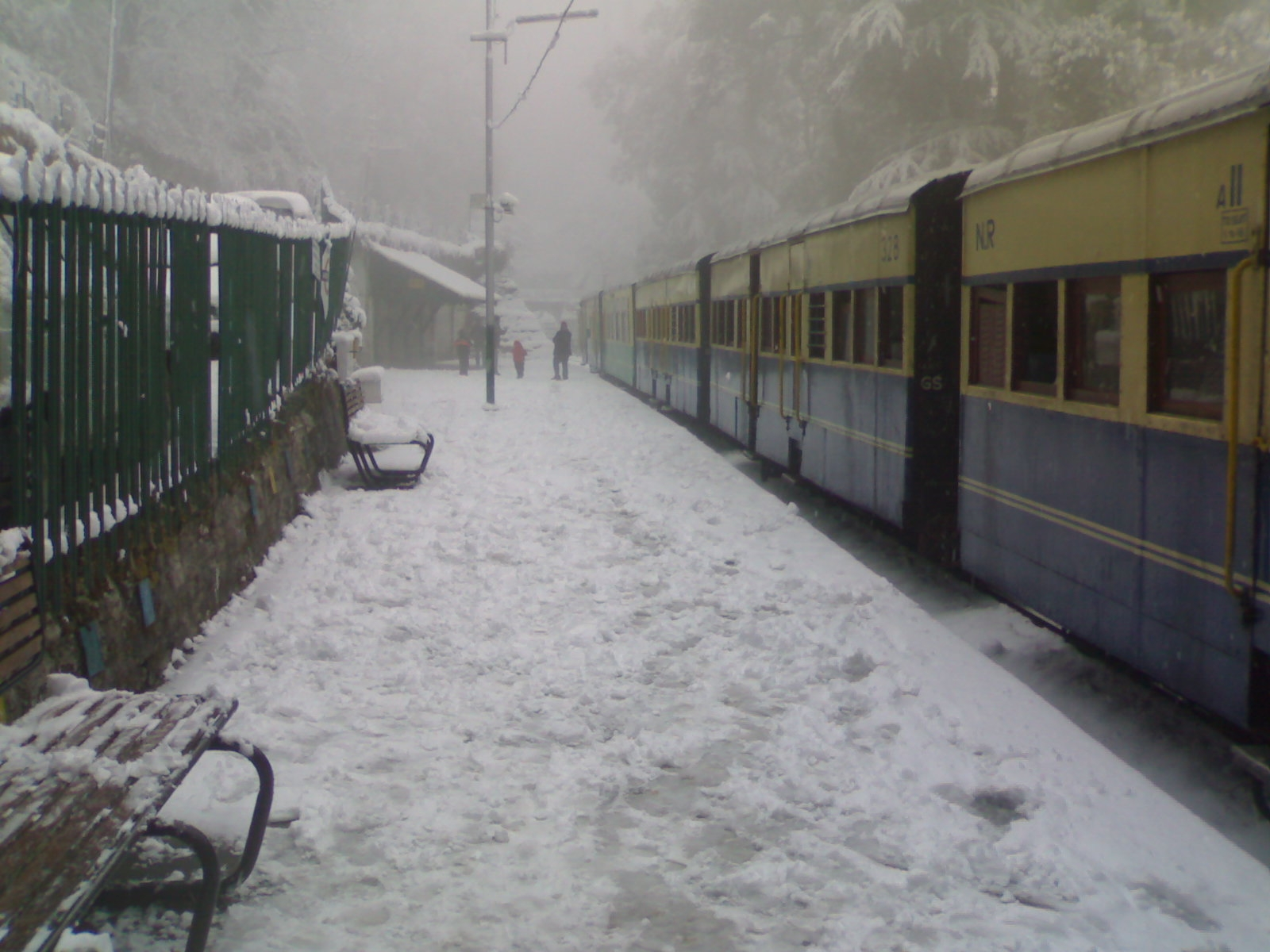
Summer Hill

=== Bridges and viaducts ===
The railway has 988 bridges and viaducts and a ruling gradient of 1 in 33, or three percent. It has 917 curves, and the sharpest is 48 degrees (a radius of 122.93 feet or 37.47 m).

The most architecturally complex bridge is No. 226 which spans a deep valley which required that it had to be constructed in five stages with each level having its own stone arched tier.

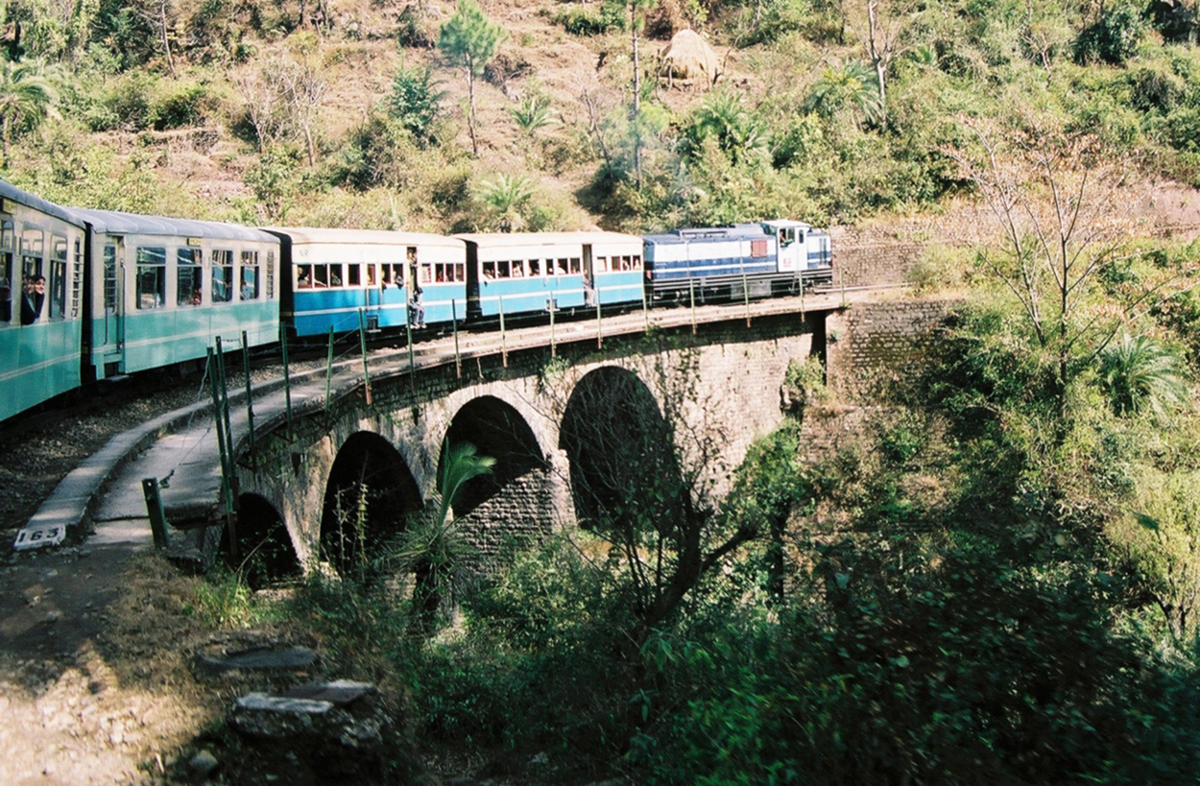
Crossing a bridge

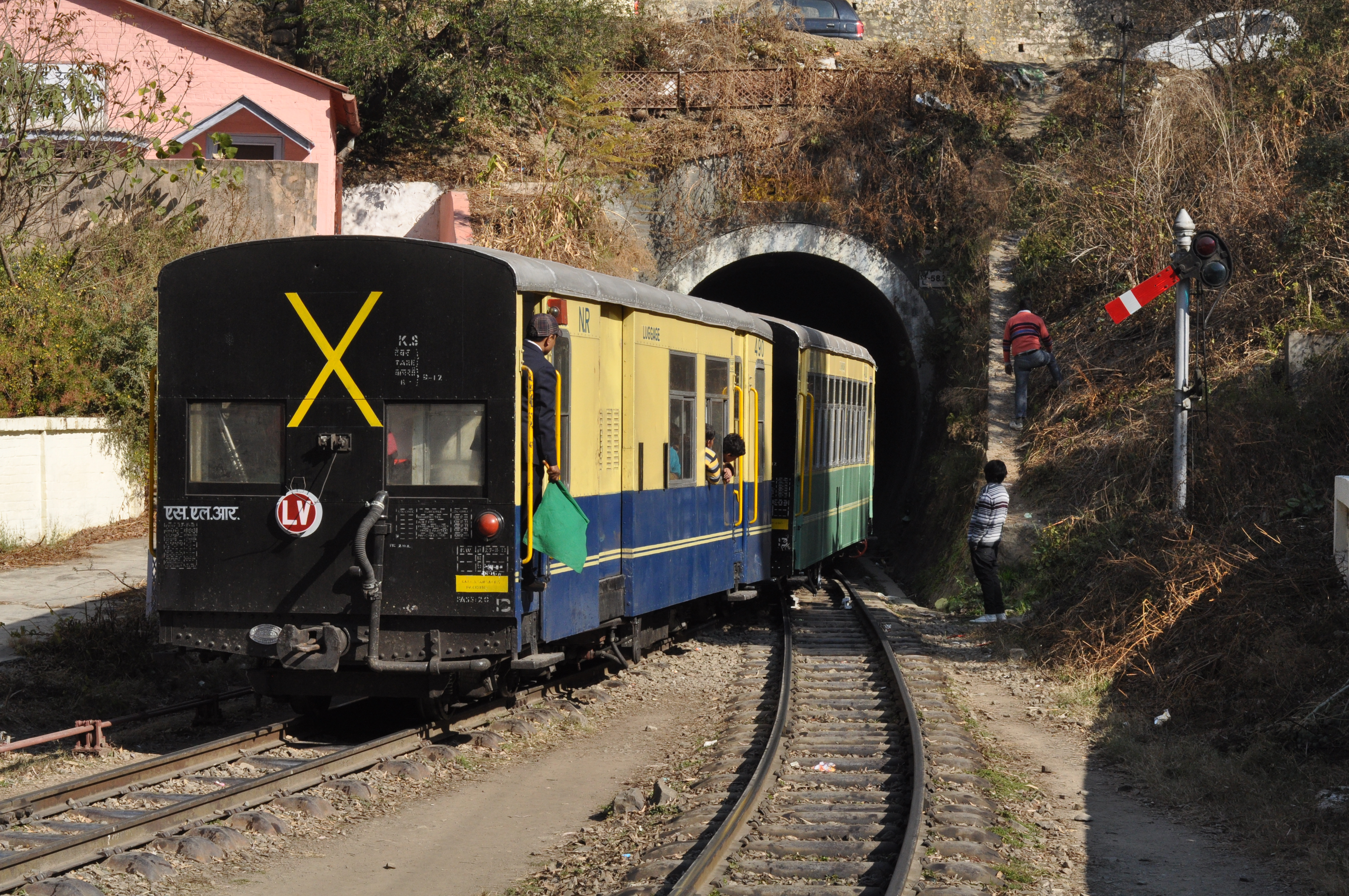
Tunnel near Solan

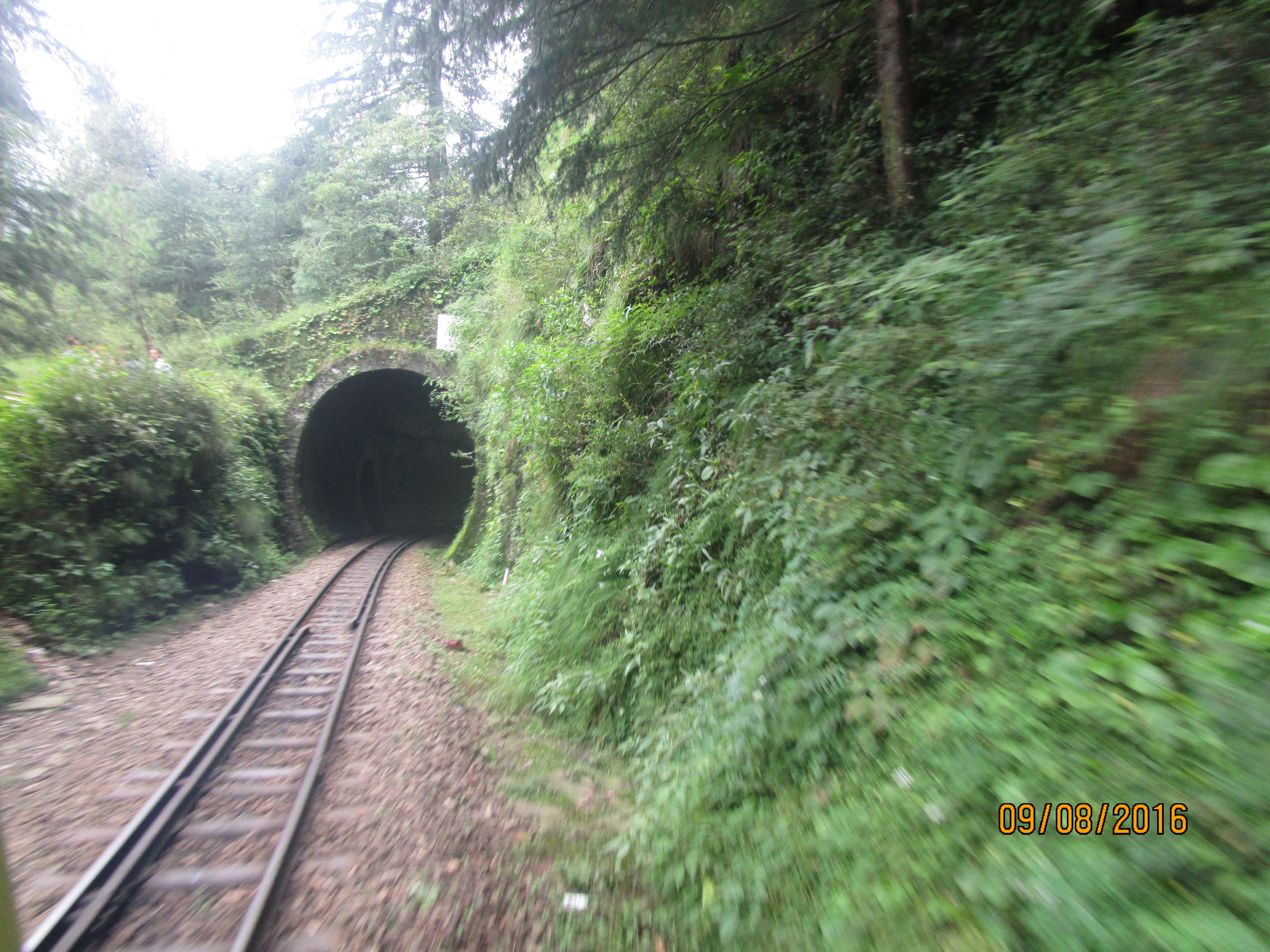
Tunnel near Jutogh

=== Tunnels ===
One hundred seven tunnels were originally built, but as a result of landslides only 102 remain in use.

=== Fossil sites ===
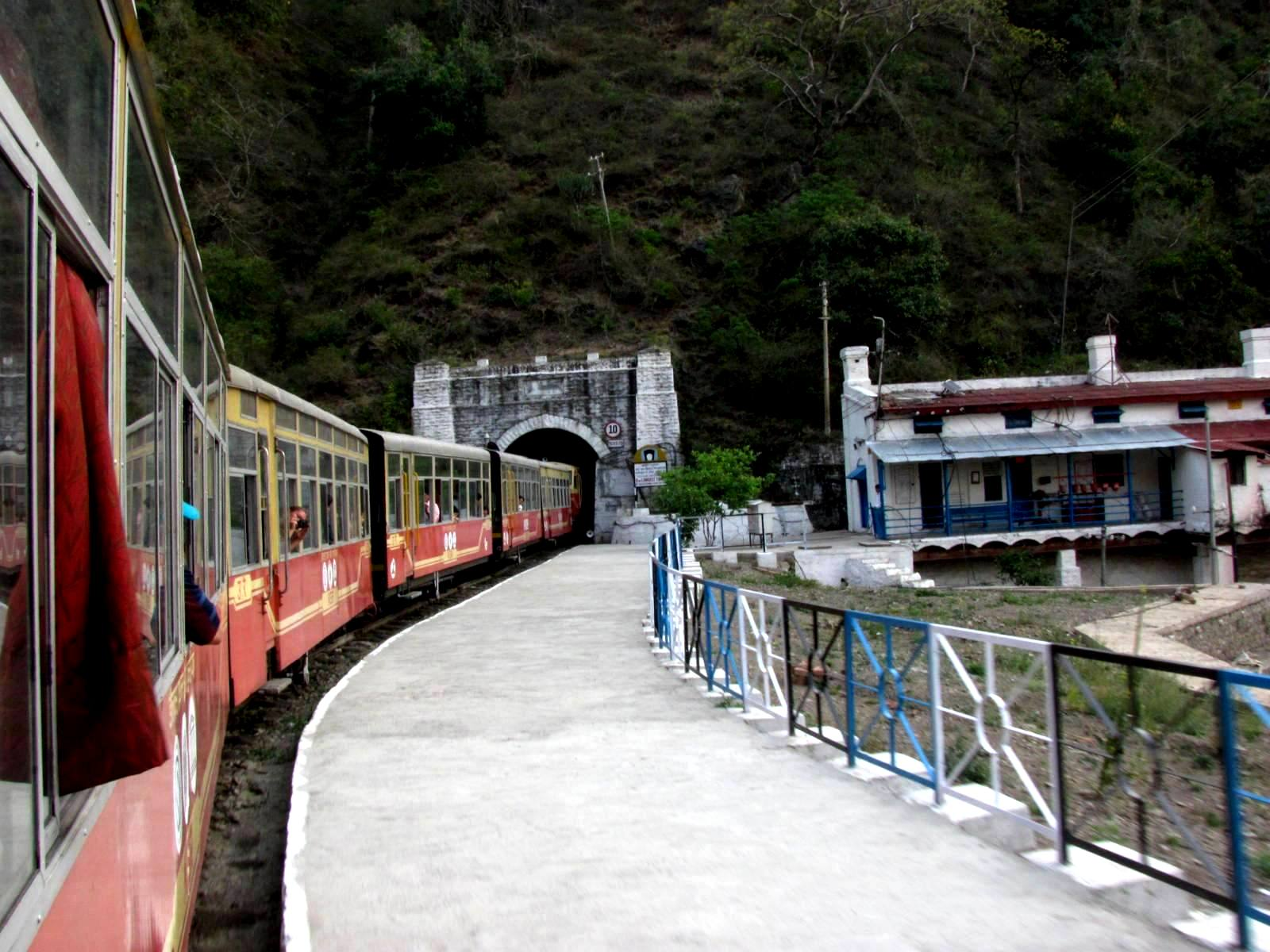
Kalka–Shimla Railway, a UNESCO World Heritage Site at railway station in Koti which is also a former princely state.

This route has the following fossil sites of Himachal Pradesh:

- Koti Railway Station on NH5: Koti is also a former princely state. A 20 million year old fossil of plant stem, potentially an early angiosperm, from Miocene era was discovered, when this area used to be a coastal area of the Tethys Ocean, and it was buried in a paleo-flood event. Birbal Sahni Institute of Palaeosciences will analyze its microscopic structure to understand India's vegetation evolution. Further excavations at this site are planned. Efforts are underway to designate the discovery site as a Geo Heritage Site to boost geotourism.
- Kumarhatti, 25 km (16 mi) from Koti station, 14 km (8.7 mi) east of Kasuali.

Other fossil sites in the area easily accessible form this route are:

- Kasauli, 22 km northwest of Koti: First fossil here was found in 1864.
- Jagjit Nagar, 30 km north of Koti and 8 km north of Kasauli on the Gharkhal-Nalagarh-Baddi Road.

== Rolling stock ==
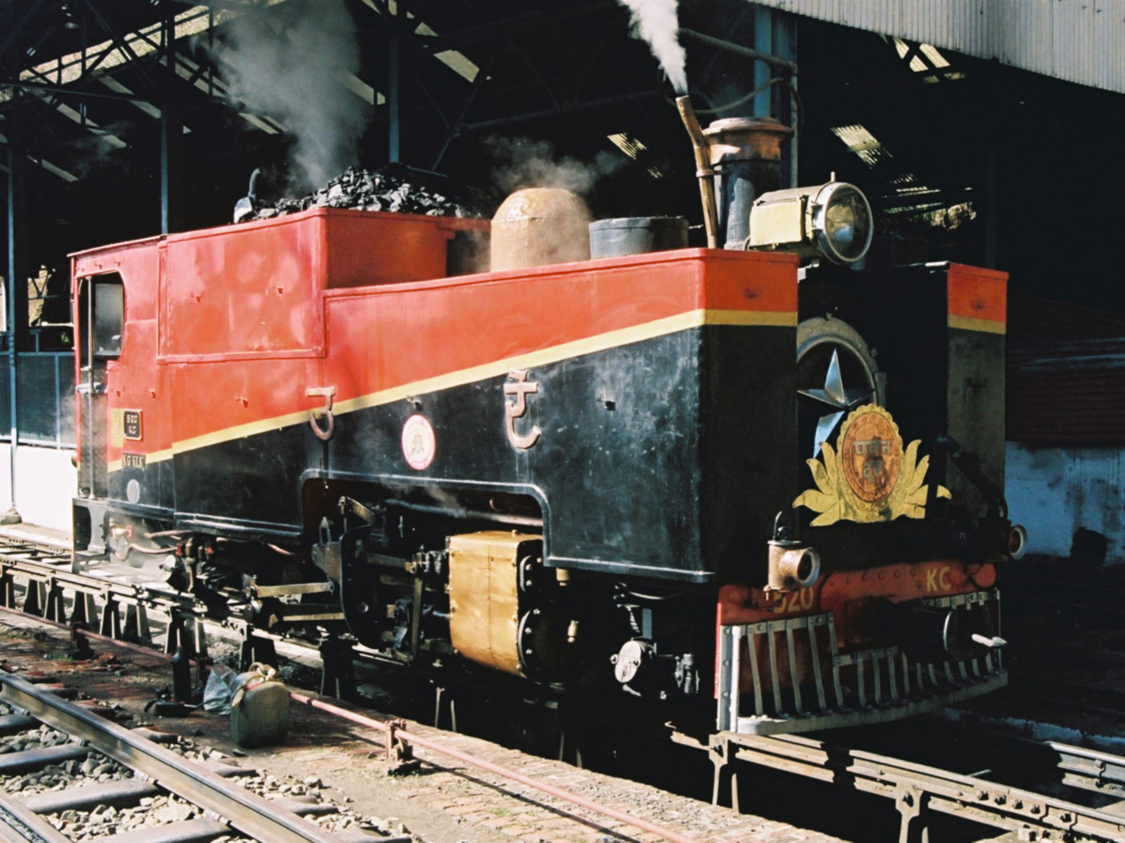
Steam locomotive 520

The first locomotives were two class-B 0-4-0STs from the Darjeeling Himalayan Railway. These were built as 2 ft (610 mm)-gauge engines, but were converted to 2 ft 6 in (762 mm)-gauge in 1901. They were not large enough (they were sold in 1908), and were followed in 1902 by 10 slightly larger engines with a 0-4-2T wheel arrangement. The locomotives weighed 21.5 long tons (21.8 t; 24.1 short tons) each, and had 30 in (762 mm) driving wheels and 12 in × 16 in (304.8 mm × 406.4 mm) cylinders. Later classified as B-class by the North Western State Railway, they were manufactured by the British Sharp, Stewart and Company.

Thirty larger 2-6-2T locomotives, with slight variations, were introduced between 1904 and 1910. Built by the Hunslet Engine and North British Locomotive Companies, they weighed about 35 long tons (36 t; 39 short tons) and had 30 in (762 mm) drivers and 14 in × 16 in (355.6 mm × 406.4 mm) cylinders. Later classed K and K2 by the North Western State Railway, they handled most of the rail traffic during the steam era. A pair of Kitson-Meyer 2-6-2+2-6-2 articulated locomotives, classed TD, were supplied in 1928. However, they quickly fell into disfavour because it often took all day for enough freight to be assembled to justify operating a goods train hauled by one of these locomotives. In 1935 NWR received locos of Class ZF, some of which were delivered from Henschel & Son/Germany.

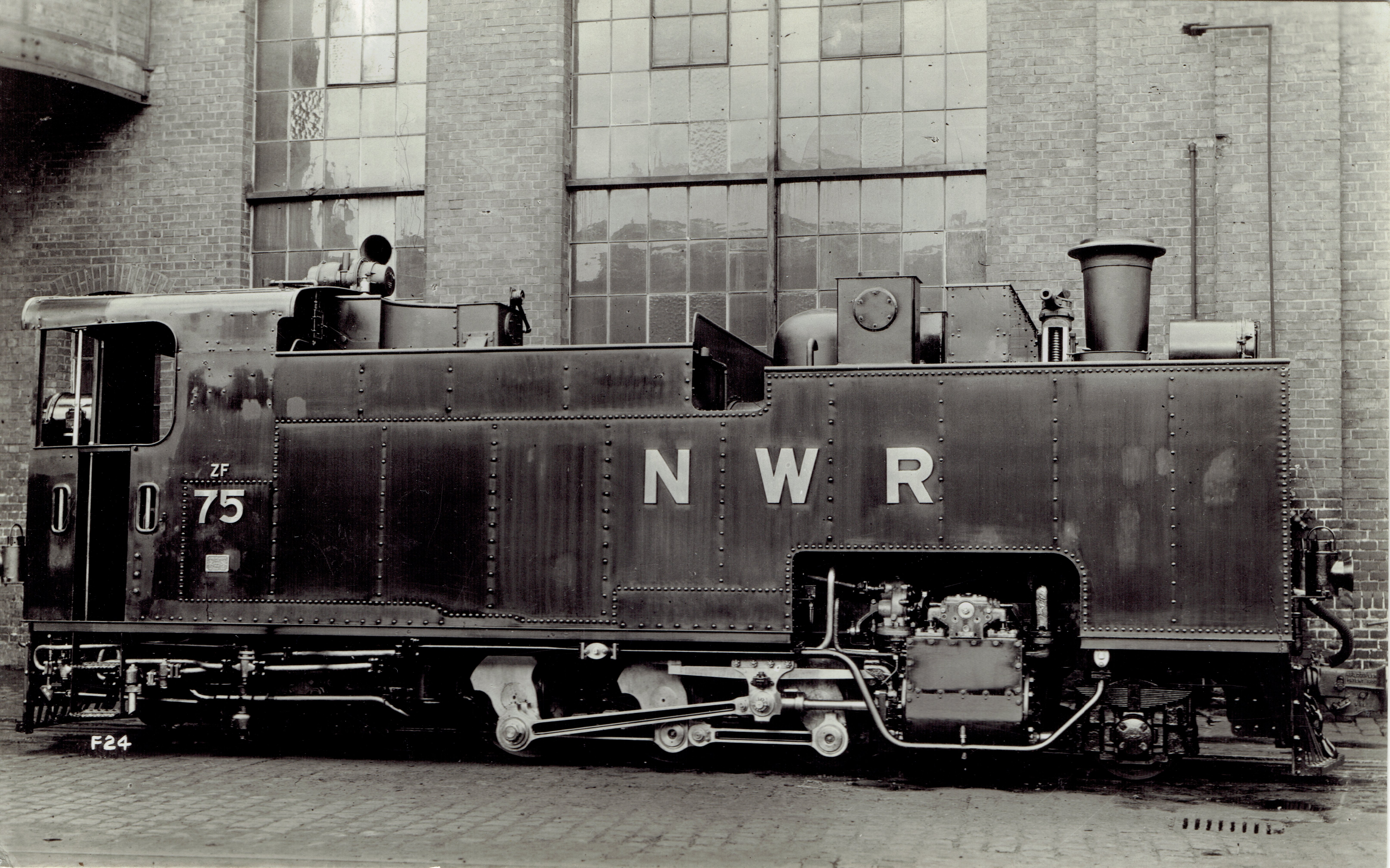
ZF 75, delivered by Henschel

Shippers looking for faster service began turning to road transport. These 68-long-ton (69.09 t; 76.16-short-ton) locomotives were soon transferred to the Kangra Valley Railway, and were converted to 1,000 mm (3 ft 3 3/8 in) metre gauge in Pakistan. Regular steam-locomotive operation ended in 1971.

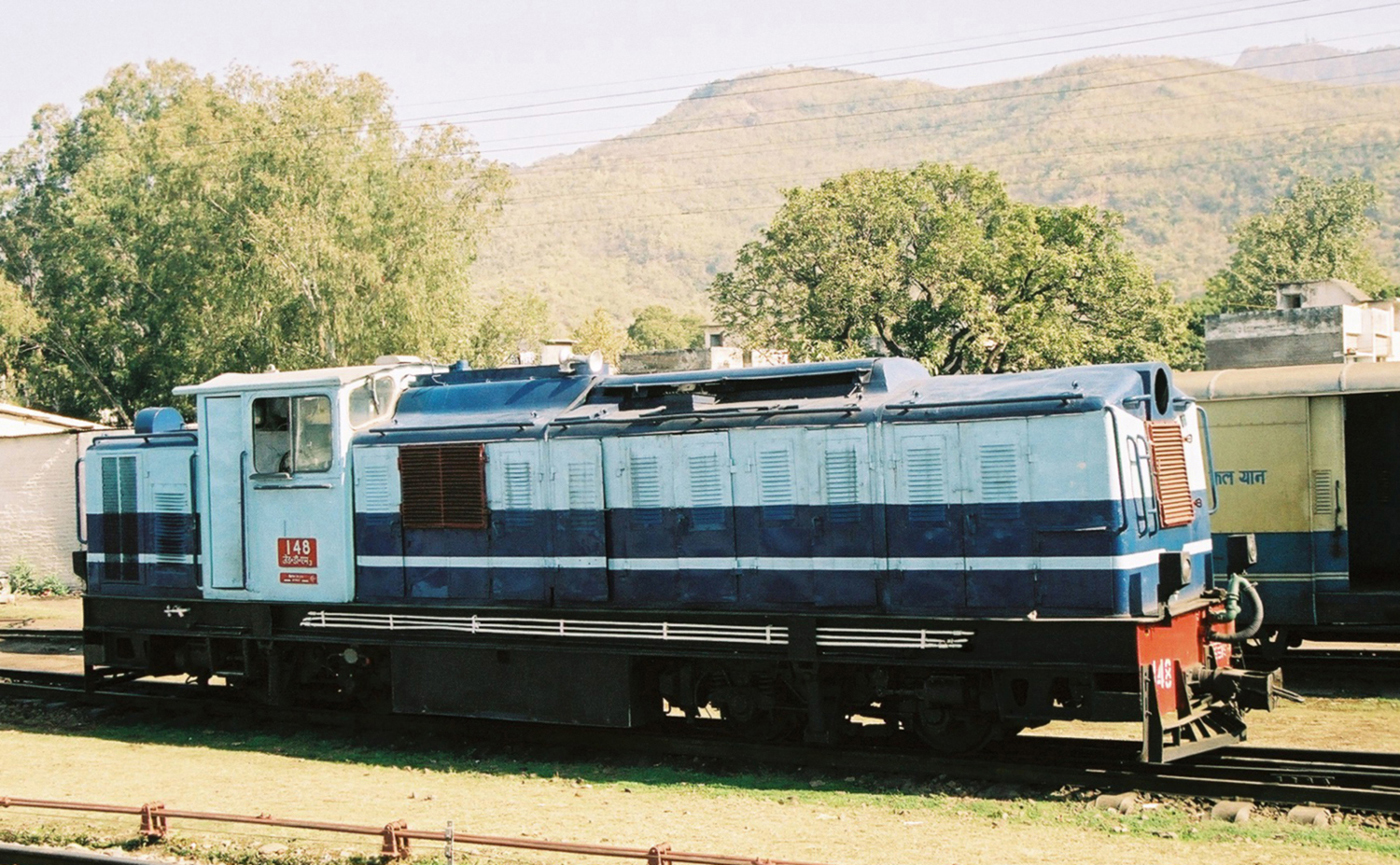
Diesel locomotive 148

The railway's first diesel locomotives, class ZDM-1 manufactured by Arnold Jung Lokomotivfabrik (articulated with two prime movers), began operating in 1955; they were regauged, reclassified as NDM-1 and used on the Matheran Hill Railway during the 1970s. In the 1960s, class ZDM-2 locomotives from Maschinenbau Kiel (MaK) was introduced; they were later transferred to other lines.

The KSR currently operates with class ZDM-3 diesel-hydraulic locomotives (522 kW or 700 hp, 50 km/h or 31 mph), built between 1970 and 1982 by Chittaranjan Locomotive Works with a single-cab road-switcher body. Six locomotives of that class were built in 2008 and 2009 by the Central Railway Loco Workshop in Parel, with updated components and a dual-cab body providing better track vision.

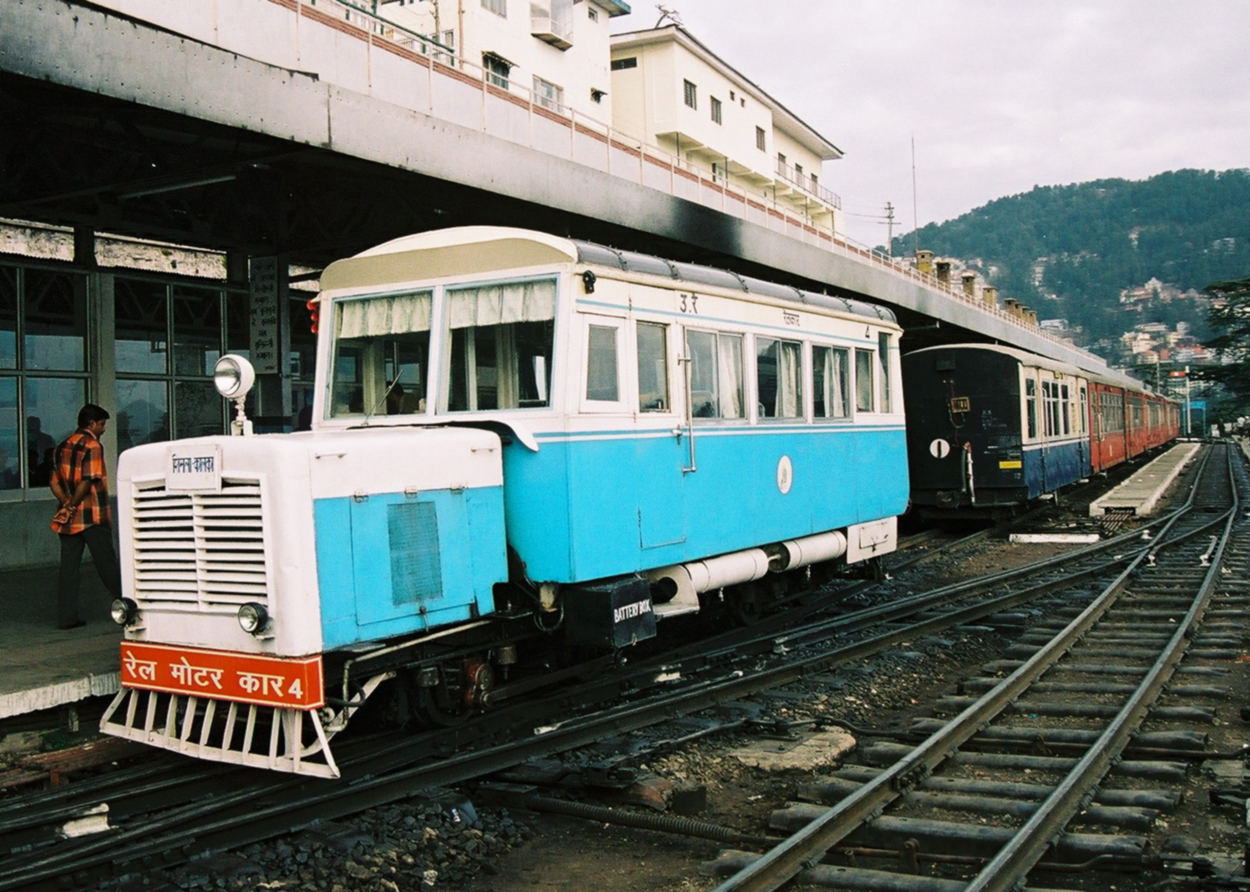
KSR railcar

The railway opened with conventional four-wheel and bogie coaches. Their tare weight meant that only four bogie coaches could be hauled by the 2-6-2T locomotives. In a 1908 effort to increase capacity, the coach stock was rebuilt as 33-by-7-foot (10.1 by 2.1 m) bogie coaches with steel frames and bodies. To further save weight, the roofs were made of aluminium. The weight savings meant that the locomotives could now haul six of the larger coaches. This was an early example of the use of aluminium in coach construction to reduce tare weight.

Goods rolling stock was constructed on a common 30-by-7-foot (9.1 by 2.1 m) pressed-steel underframe. Open and covered wagons were provided, with the open wagons having a capacity of 19 long tons (19.30 t; 21.28 short tons) and the covered wagons 17.5 long tons (17.8 t; 19.6 short tons).

During the winter months snow cutters are attached to the engine to clear the snow from the track.

=== Trains ===
- Shivalik Deluxe Express: Ten coaches, with chair cars and meal service. This train connects with the Netaji Express.
- Kalka Shimla Express: First and second class and unreserved seating
- Himalayan Queen: Connects at Kalka with the express mail of the same name and the Kalka Shatabdi Express to Delhi.
- Kalka Shimla Passenger: First and second class and unreserved seating
- Rail Motor: First-class railbus with a glass roof and a front view
- Shivalik Queen: Ten-carriage luxury fleet. Each carriage accommodates up to eight people and has two toilets, wall-to-wall carpeting and large windows. Available through IRCTC's Chandigarh office.

== In popular culture ==
BBC Four televised Indian Hill Railways, a series of three programmes which featured the KSR in its third episode, in February 2010; the first two episodes covered the Darjeeling Himalayan Railway and Nilgiri Mountain Railway. The episodes, directed by Tarun Bhartiya, Hugo Smith and Nick Mattingly respectively, were produced by Gerry Troyna. Indian Hill Railways won a Royal Television Society award in June 2010. The KSR also featured in the Punjab episode of CNN's Anthony Bourdain: Parts Unknown.

In 2018, the KSR was featured in an episode of the BBC Two programme Great Indian Railway Journeys.

=== Gallery ===
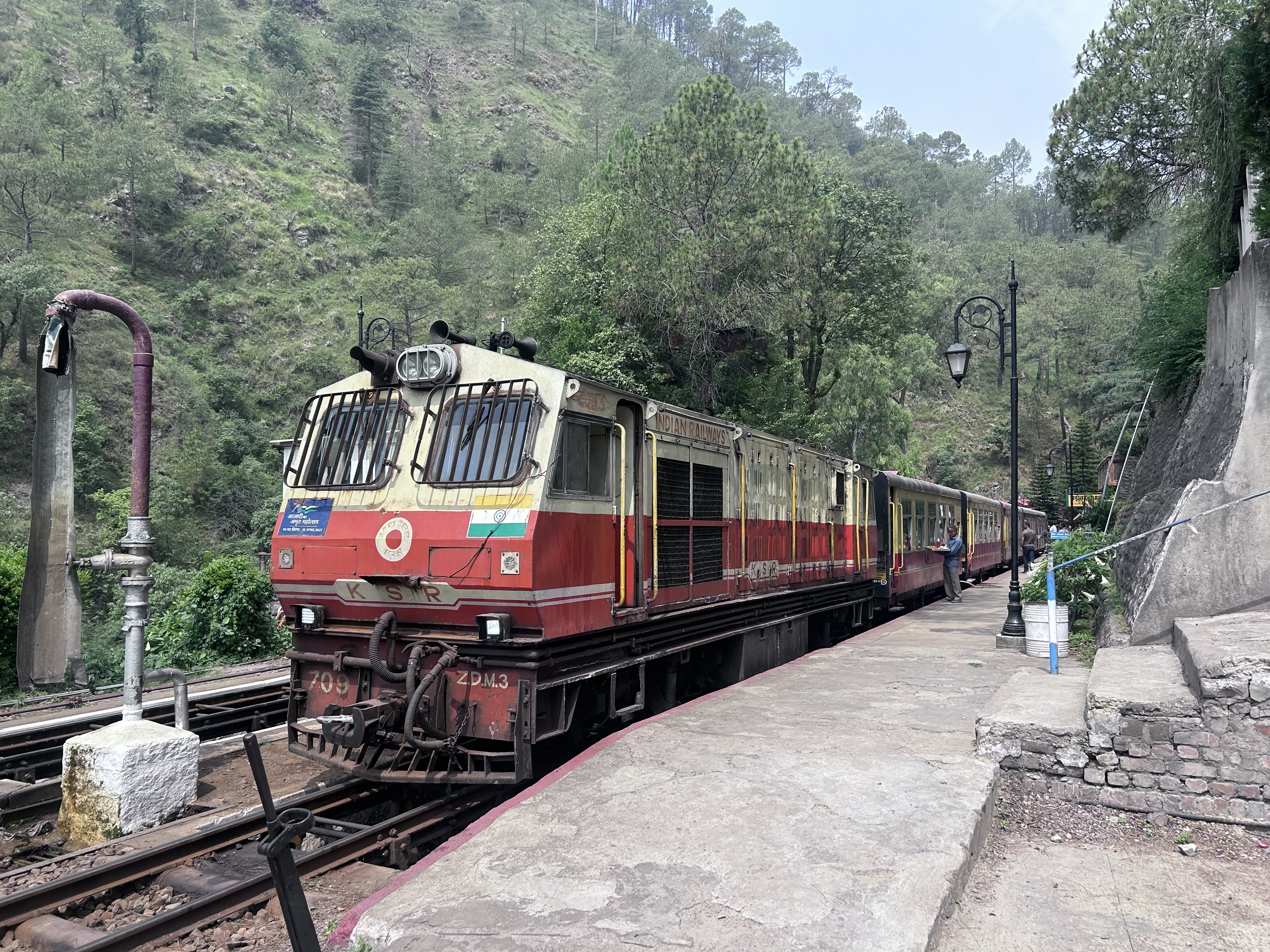
The Kalka–Shimla Rail, Solan station

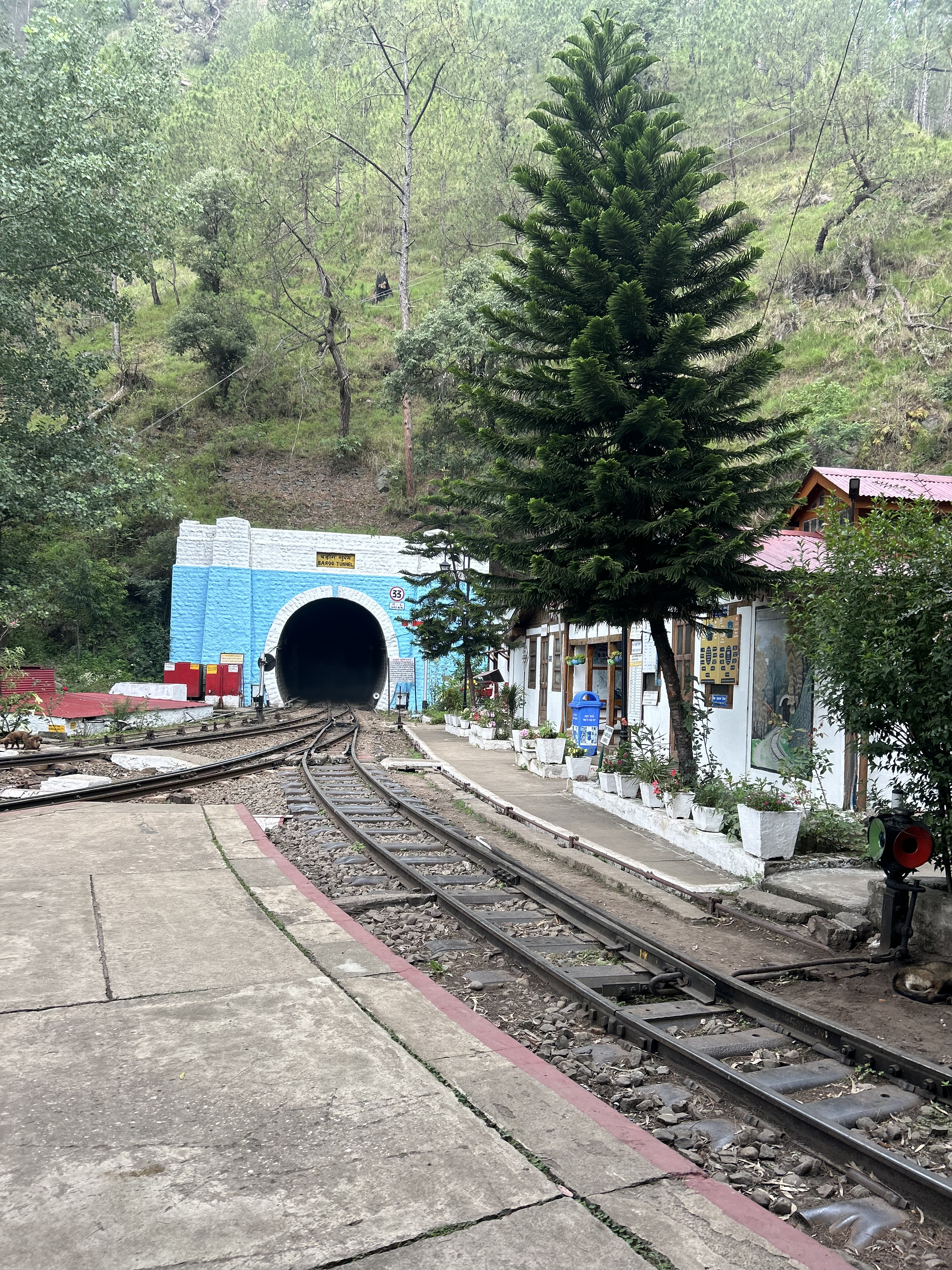
The Kalka–Shimla Railway, Solan station

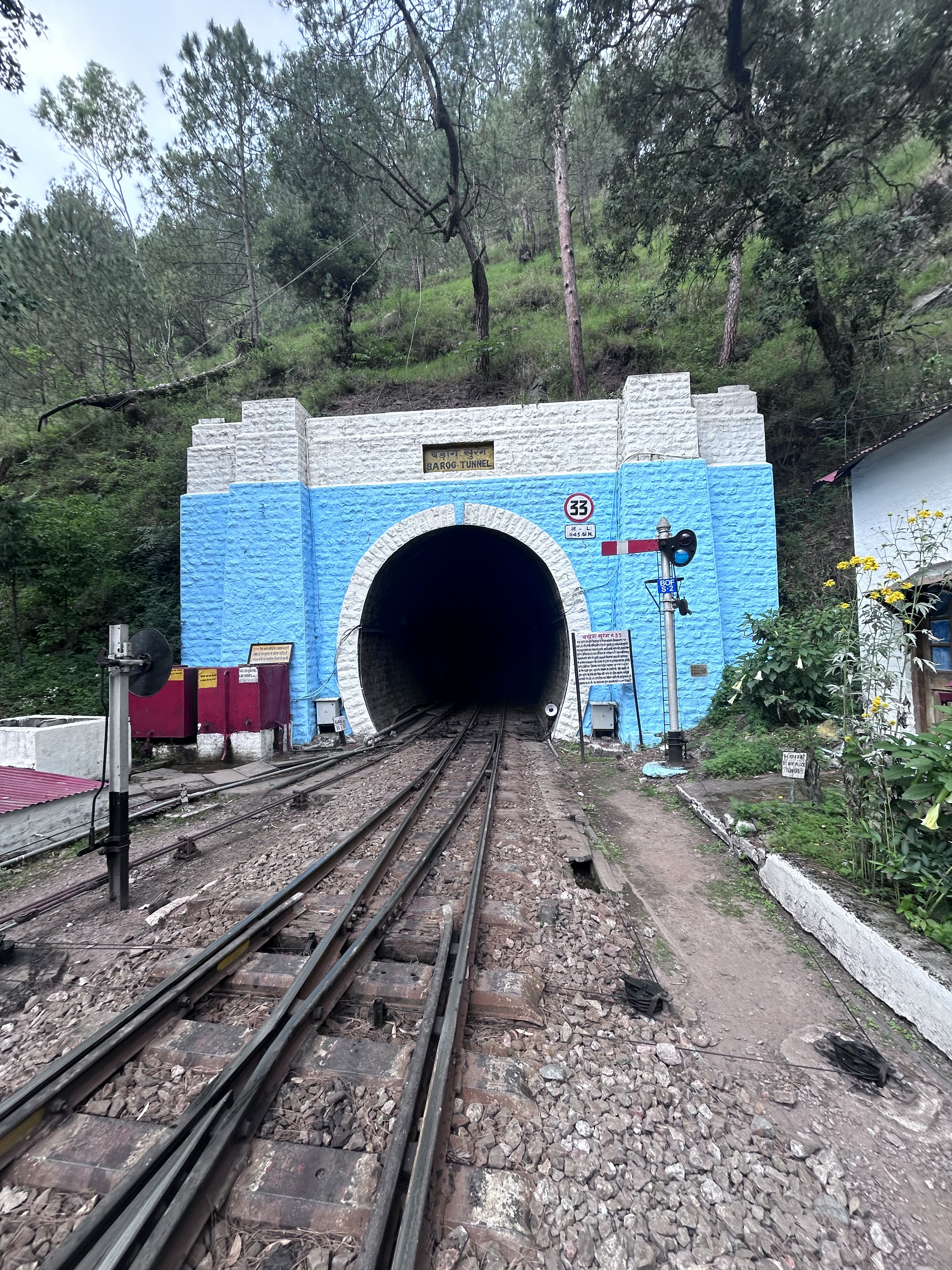
The Kalka–Shimla Railway, Solan station

== See also ==
- Mountain railways of India
- Rail transport in India
- Tourism in India
