= Shimla railway station =

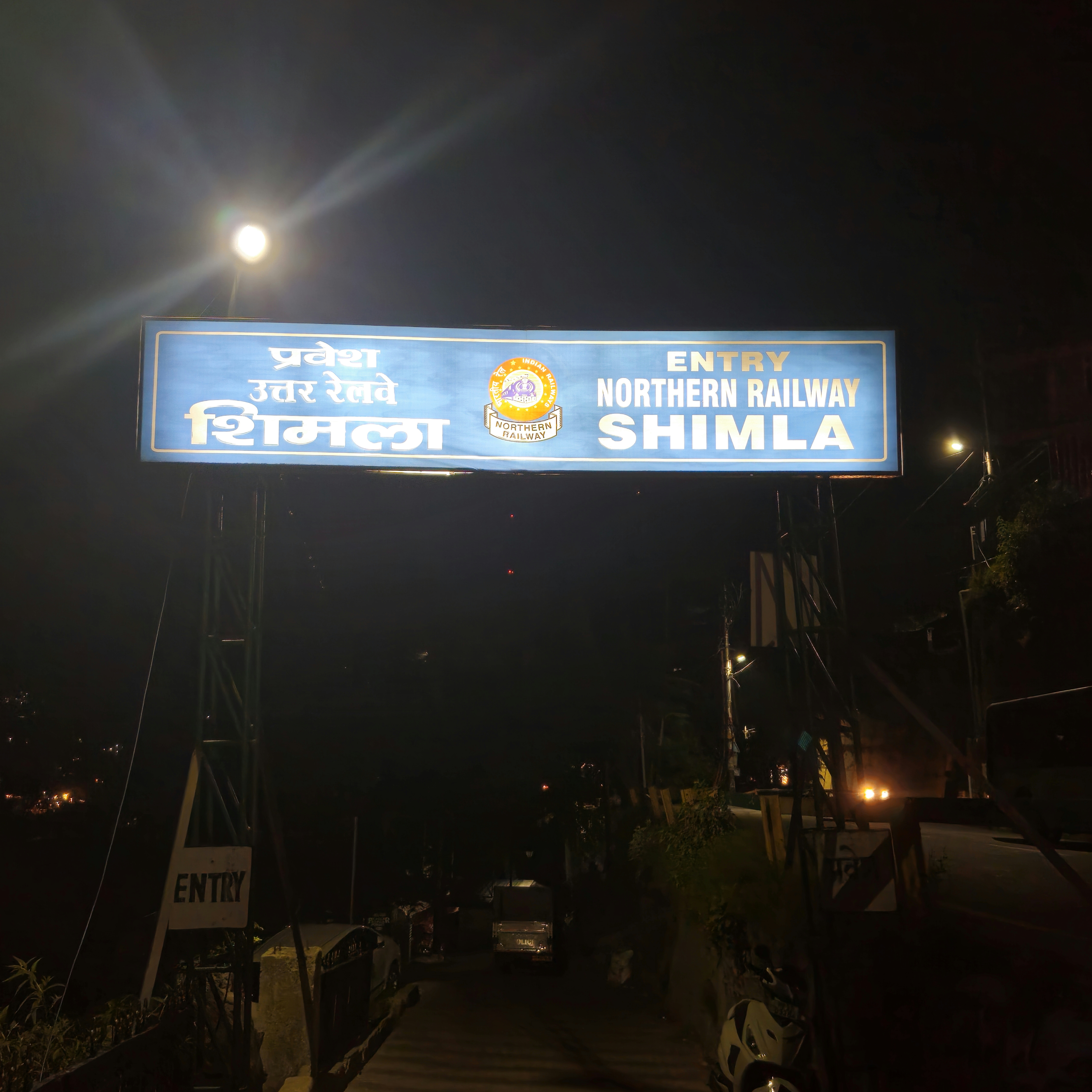
- Shimla railway station entry gate No. 1

General information
- Location: NH 22, Nabha, Shimla, Himachal Pradesh; India
- Coordinates: 31.1025°N 77.1601°E
- Elevation: 2,075 metres (6,808 ft)
- System: Indian Railways station
- Owner: Indian Railways
- Line: Kalka–Shimla Railway
- Platforms: 2
- Tracks: 4 (Narrow Gauge)
- Connections: Auto stand

Construction
- Structure type: Standard (on-ground station)
- Parking: No
- Cycle facilities: No

Other information
- Status: Functioning
- Station code: SML
- Zone(s): Northern Railway
- Division(s): Ambala

History
- Opened: 1903
- Location within India

UNESCO World Heritage Site
- Part of: Mountain Railways of India
- Criteria: Cultural: (ii)(iv)
- Reference: 944ter-002
- Inscription: 1999 (23rd Session)
- Extensions: 2005, 2008
- Area: 4.59 ha (11.3 acres)
- Buffer zone: 500 ha (1,200 acres)
- Coordinates: 31°06′09″N 77°09′35″E
Location
- Location within India Location within Himachal Pradesh

Shimla railway station (station code: SML) is a railway station in Shimla in the Indian state of Himachal Pradesh. The station is the terminus of the UNESCO World Heritage Site Kalka–Shimla Railway. Shimla railway station is located at an altitude of 2,075 metres (6,808 ft) above mean sea level. It was allotted the railway code of SML under the jurisdiction of Ambala railway division. The 762 mm (2 ft 6 in)-wide narrow-gauge Kalka-Shimla Railway was constructed by Delhi–Ambala–Kalka Railway Company and opened for traffic in 1903.

== History ==
The station opened in 1903. Originally, the walls of the station building were made of wood with a sloping galvanised iron roof, but due to the growth in traffic it was rebuilt and extended in 1921 with a new double storey brick masonry (plastered in lime mortar) building housing the offices of the station master, staff and control, accident relief arrangements, waiting rooms, telegraph office and shelters. After the roof over the platform collapsed in 1944 due to a heavy snowfall a new roof over the station building and platform was built.

In 1986–87 the station was redeveloped with end-to-end platform shelters, while the platform was resurfaced and various services refurbished or rebuilt such as the tourist information office, railway telephone exchange, platform ticketing office, reservation office while 10 new retiring rooms (each having large windows providing a valley view) were installed and a waiting hall provided on the ground floor.

== Originating Trains ==
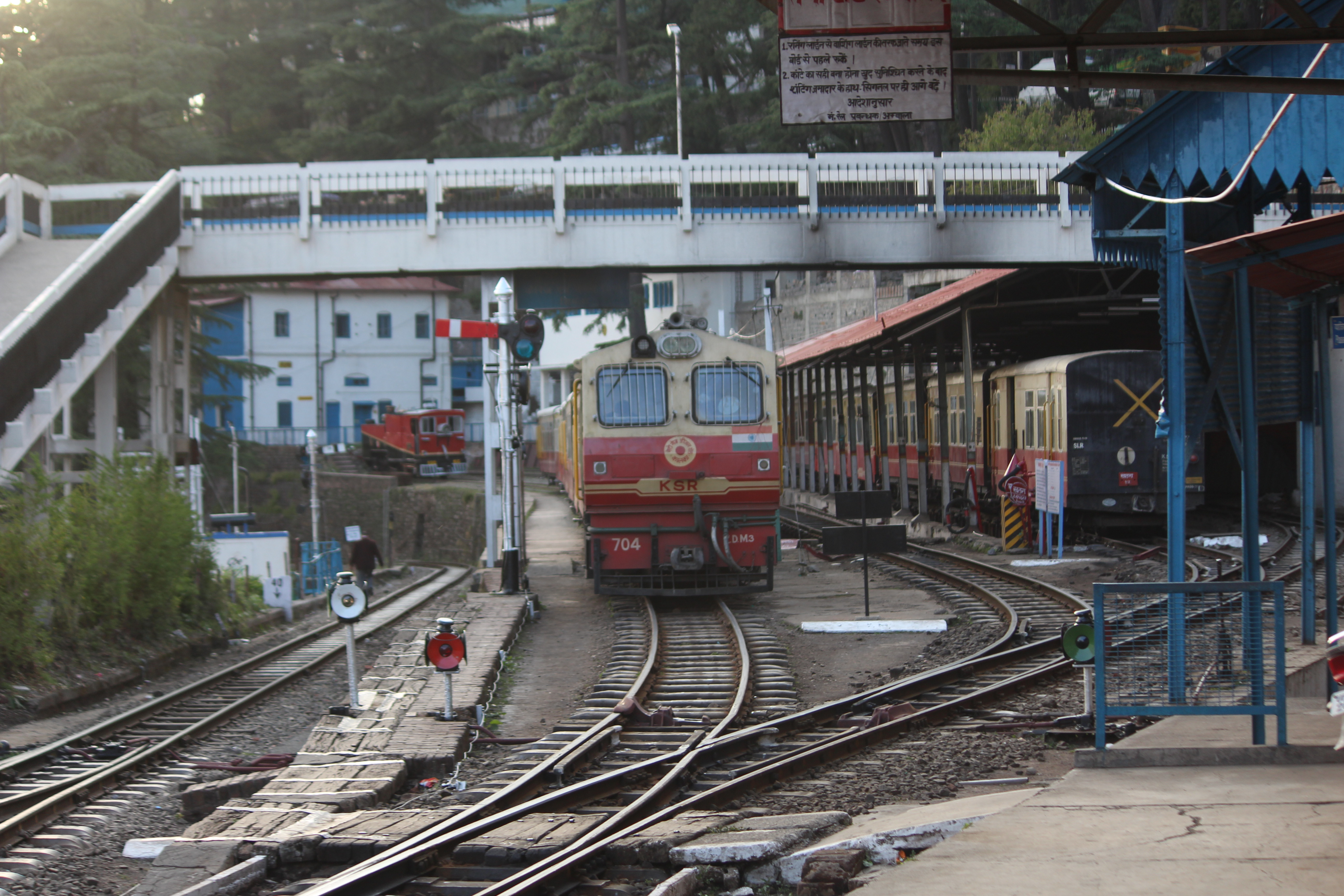
Approaching train at Shimla Railway Station

The nearest broad gauge railway station to Shimla is Kalka. It is the Kalka to Shimla train route to reach Shimla which is one of World's most iconic train routes.

| Train No. | Train Name | Destination | Departure | Running | Halts |
|---|---|---|---|---|---|
| 01624 | Shimla - Kalka Summer Special | Kalka | 09:20 | All Days | |
| 52456 | Himalayan Queen | Kalka | 10:40 | All Days | Summer Hill, Jutgoh, Taradevi, Shoghi, Kandaghat, Salogra, Solan, Barog, Dharmpur Himachal |
| 72452 | Rail Motor | Kalka | 11:40 | All Days | N.A. |
| 52458 | Shimla - Kalka Express | Kalka | 14:15 | All Days | Summer Hill, Jutogh, Taradevi, Shoghi, Kathleeghat, Kanoh, Kandaghat, Salogra, Solan, Barog, Kumarhatti, Dharmpur Himachal, Sonwara, Koti, Gumman, Taksal |
| 52460 | Him Darshan Express | Kalka | 15:50 | All Days | Barog |
| 52452 | Shivalik Deluxe Express | Kalka | 17:55 | All Days | Barog |
| 52454 | Shimla - Kalka NG Express | Kalka | 18:35 | All Days | Summer Hill, Jutogh, Taradevi, Shoghi, Kathleeghat, Kanoh, Kandaghat, Salogra, Solan, Barog, Kumarhatti, Dharmpur Himachal |
