= Jaunsari =

Jaunsari may refer to:

- Jaunsari people, an ethnic group of northern India
- Jaunsari language, their language
