= Hattee people =

Socio-cultural community in India

Hatti
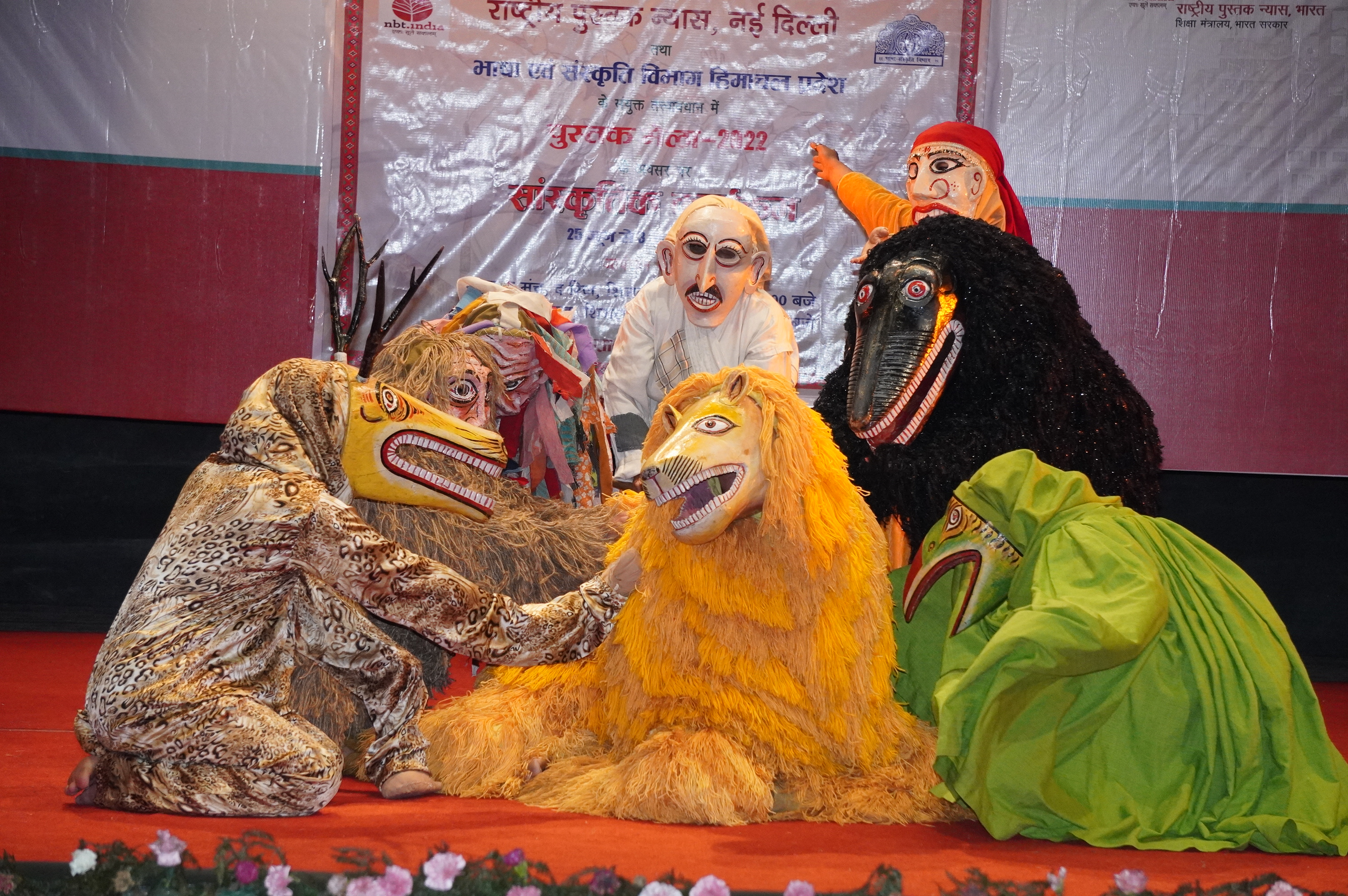
- Singhtu dance by Hatti people

Regions with significant populations
- Mahasu region, concentrated in its sub-regions of Jaunsar-Bawar, Uttarakhand and Trans-Giri of Sirmaur, Himachal Pradesh

Languages
- Western Pahari (Sirmauri); (Jaunsari)

Religion
- Hinduism

Related ethnic groups
- Jaunsaris

Hatti or Hattee are a Pahari-speaking socio-cultural community found in Himachal Pradesh and Uttarakhand. They are an isolated community concentrated particularly in Trans-Giri region in Sirmaur, Himachal Pradesh and adjacent region of Jaunsar-Bawar in Uttarakhand. They are famous for their distinct market places (known as Hatts) and known for faternal polyandry practice.

They are currently recognized as Schedule Tribe community in Himachal Pradesh.

== Overview ==
=== Etymology ===
The isolated people of Trans-Giri region are famous for their traditional markets setup in the distinct styles known as Hatts from which the community is called to the Hattis (or Hattee), deriving from the word Hatt.

=== Geographic distribution ===
The Hattis are sub-divided into two groups: Giri Paar Hattis and Jaunsar Hattis, of whom the 'Giri Paars' inhabitates the region of Trans-Giri (known as Giri Paar in Western Pahari) and 'Jaunsar Hatti' in region of Jaunsar-Bawar. They use to set up their markets (or Hatt) in their regions, often adjacent places of Dehradun, Shimla and Solan leading to small population being settled in these places.

== Culture ==
They have inhabited the regions of Trans-Giri and have remained insolated due to the geographical barriers of high mountain ranges. The Hatts setup by them for trade is unique part of their culture and due to dependence on agriculture and animal husbandry, their trade is mostly related to plants and animal products. They are known for their tribal lifestyle, similar to the culture of the Jaunsaris and have prominence of traditional governing system called Khumbli (community councils) with strong customary laws on marriage, property and dispute. They have many practices distinct from the neighbouring communities and unique form of mask dance called as Sinhtoo or Singhtu, where they dance portraying them as Lions. Other dances like Sirmouri Natti, Bharaltoo Dance, Dagyali Naach and Budhyachu dances are famous among the community. They also follows practice of polyandry, though which is rare called "Jodidara".

Hattis have been culturally Hindus and worship Mahasu Devta, similar to other communities of Mahasu region. During the time of Sirmur State, they were introduced with traditional Hinduism and developed reverence of Kuldevis and with time the priest caste emerged in the community called Bhat. They have caste system among them with upper castes (Bhatts and Khasas) and lower castes (Badhoi).

== Scheduled Tribe status ==
Hattis from long have argued that they were similar to the Jaunsaris of Uttarakhand with similar culture and practices, and asked the Government to include them in the Scheduled Tribe category similar to Jaunsaris in Uttrakhand and Uttar Pradesh. They have insisted the government that their distinct culture and lifestyle qualifies the criteria of them being a Tribe, alongside they inhabit the remote areas of the Trans-Giri (Mahasu region) and Jaunsar-Bawar and their similar comunities in the Jaunsar-Bawar region have been granted as Scheduled Tribe. Though, their inclusion in the Scheduled Tribe (ST) list was met by opposition from other tribal communities due to their high landholding and better lifestyle and socio-economic conditions. The opposition was supported by the Scheduled castes community of Trans-Giri region arguing to grant of ST status to the upper castes within the community, which would provide them immunity from atrocity laws.

In 2023, the Government of India recognized the "Hattee in Trans-Giri region of Sirmaur district" as Scheduled Tribes through The Constitution (Scheduled Tribes) Order (Fouth Amendment) Act, 2022 after approval from Rajya Sabha.
