= Harul =

Indian folk dance

Harul (हारुल) is a special form of folk song and dance performed by the Jaunsari tribe in Uttarakhand and the Hatee tribe in Himachal Pradesh. Sharing similarities with Nati, Harul contains descriptions of the history, heroic stories of the gods and goddesses of the hills and events that occurred in history of the tribe's culture. Harul has special significance in local festivals and celebrations.

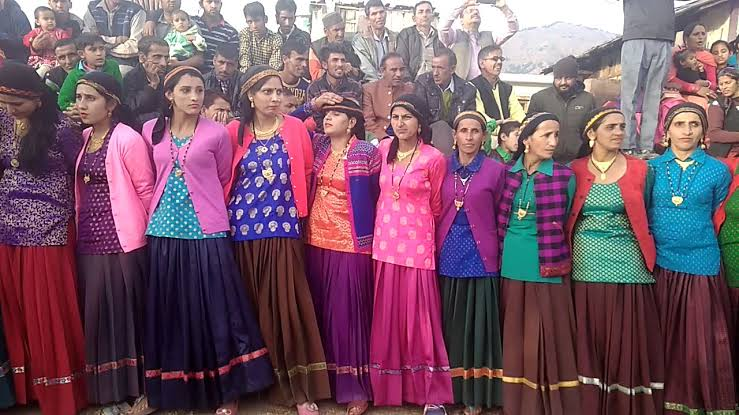
Traditional Harul dance

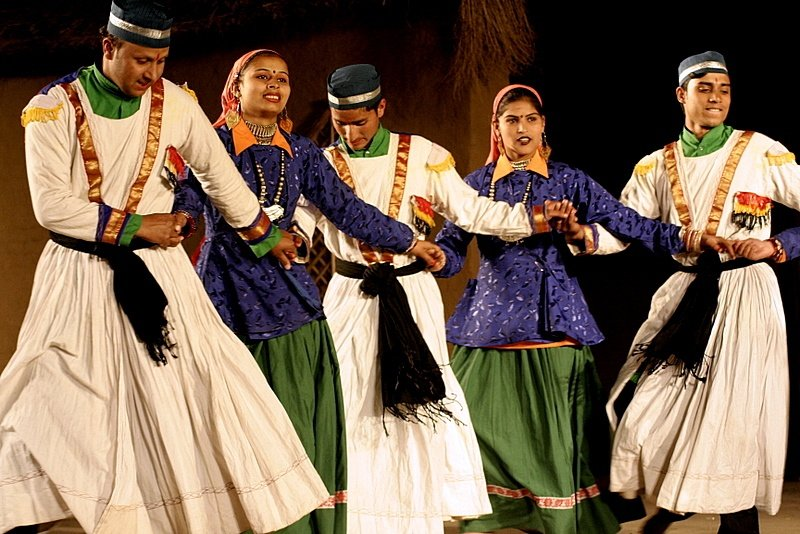
Harul Dance by Jaunsar Tribals

Harul is a traditional Indian folk song-cum-dance performed in the Jaunsar-Bawar and Trans-Giri region of Sirmaur district in Himachal Pradesh. Both men and women can take part. In this dance, participants hold on to each other forming a long line and perform the traditional harul steps. Those who occupy the end positions hold up with a single hand. This dance is performed in a cheerful mood. Each harul song is in a narrative format that tells a tale of the past and the dance is usually done to those Haruls which converse between a man and a woman. The participants may also organize themselves into semi-circles, with the outer semi-circle is generally formed by men and the inner one by women. Basic steps consist of slow & fast footworks, tapping and criss-crossing while moving, accompanied by occasional knee bending, in sync with the rhythm. Participants wear colourful traditional clothes.
