= Jaunsari people =

Ethnolinguistic group in Uttarakhand, India

Jaunsari
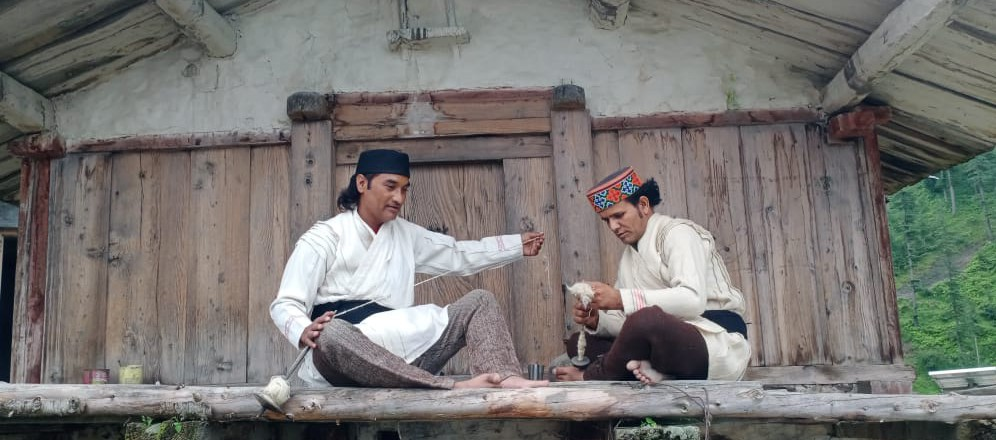
- Jaunsari men in traditional clothing

Total population
- c. 92,000 (c. 130,000) c. 130,000 (including those of ancestral descent)

Regions with significant populations
- Jaunsar-Bawar
- Uttarakhand: 88,664
- Uttar Pradesh: 3,720

Languages
- Jaunsari

Religion
- Predominantly: Hinduism

Related ethnic groups
- Hattee

The Jaunsari is a community found in the Jaunsar-Bawar region of the North Indian state of Uttarakhand. They speak the Jaunsari language which is a Western Pahari language as well as Indo-Aryan language.

They are an isolated hilly community which is recognized as Scheduled Tribe in Uttarakhand as per Indian government affirmative policy.

== Etymology ==
Jaunsari is most likely to be derived from a demonym to describe the members inhabiting the Jaunsar-Bawar. Though there has been debate regarding the evolution of the tribe as a linguistic community, due to their use of Jaunsari language.

== Society ==
The society follows a rigid caste-based system, which is divided into Khasas (upper-castes), Koltas (lower-castes) and working communities. The Khasas Jaunsaris consists of Brahmins and Rajputs who are dominant and land-owning communities in the region, while the Kolta is a term used for the Dalits or lower caste communities such as Bajgi, Chamar, Dom, Koli and Shilpkar who were majority artisans and landless communities working in the lands of the Khasas. There are also working communities such as Badhai (carpenter), Lohar (ironsmith), Sunar (goldsmith) and others. The region had feudal roots and Zamindari system, where a cluster of villages were grouped as Khats and were administered by a Siyana. The Siyana was a herediatery position with him being the head of the particular 'Khat', taking decisions in the village court called Khat Khumri and owner of the agricultural land, considered as respectable and powerful person. Though the system was abolished under the Jaunsar Bawar Pargana Abolition of Zamindari Act, 1955, but due to being a Scheduled Areas the village justice system through the village court (Khumri) is still legal to many extent.

There is a rigid division of castes and their clans among the upper-caste Khasas Jaunsaris, with Brahmins having Joshi, Sharma and Nautiyal, and Rajputs clans of Chauhan, Parmar, Rana, Rathore, Rawat, Tomar and Negi.

The community had very little interactions with the outside of region because of geographic isolation due to hilly terrain. Despite being part of Garhwal region, the society and culture of Jaunsaris is similar to the neighbouring Hatti community of Sirmaur as the region was part of the Sirmur State (modern-day Himachal Pradesh).

== Culture ==
=== Festivals ===
A native speaker from Uttarakhand speaking in Jaunsari language

The community reveres Mahasu Devta which is the principal deity of that community. Dance and music are integral part of Jaunsari culture. During festivals both men and women dance under the intoxication of the folk music. Local people perform folk dances such as Harul, Ghundiya Raso, Jhenta Raso, Jangbazi, Thoude, etc. Fairs like Moroj and Bissu are held which mark the harvesting period. The community is known for their Nati, which is combination of folk dance with music.

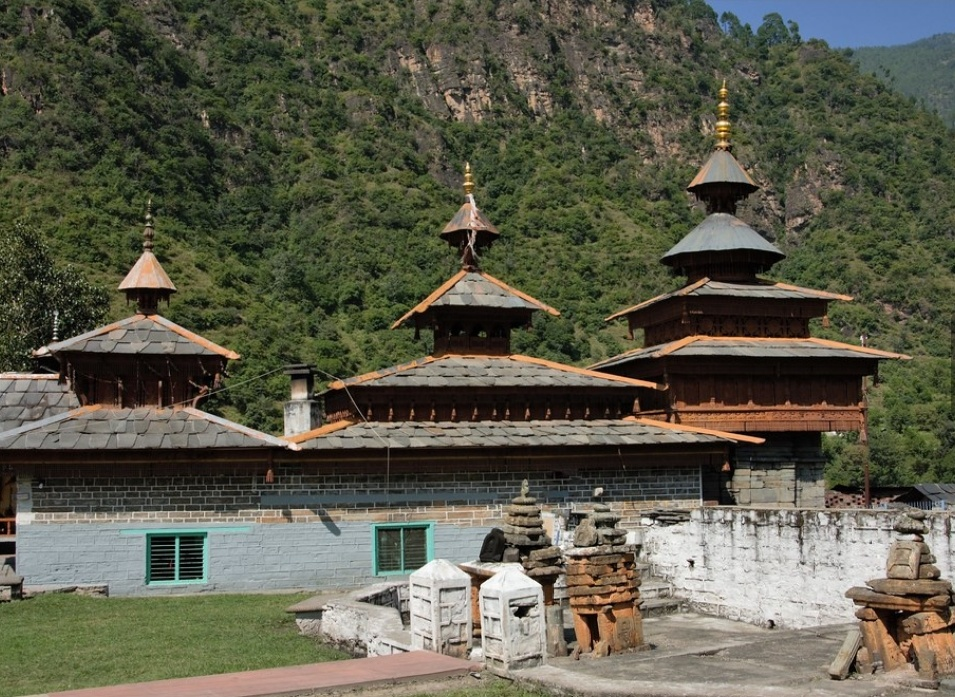
View of Mahasu Devta Temple.

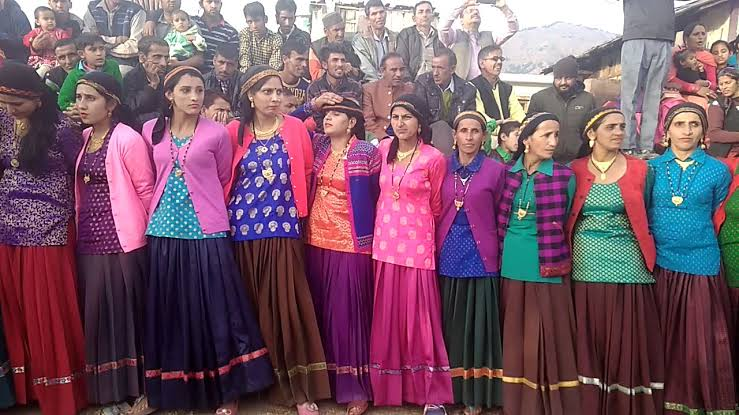
Traditional Harul dance

=== Clothing ===
As a society which resides in the harsh climate of the Himalayas, their clothing is primarily woollen oriented which would keep them warm. Their attire stands out from the rest of Uttarakhand.

The men wear a woolen pyjama known as Jhangel and on top of that they wear a woollen robe known as Choro, both made up of sheep wool. The Choro can be kept loose, or it can be tucked in both of the sides and can be bound at the waist with a woollen belt known as Manjan and can be draped over the shoulders without tucking in the arms. Traditionally men fashioned a Diguwa which is basically a round, woollen, elongated beanie with its sides rolled up like a tube and given a form of a skull cap, usually available in balck or brown in colour. Black Gandhi Caps were in vogue from mid to late 20th century, but in modern fashion men can be seen sporting a Himachali cap.

During winters, due to snowing many people wear woollen shoes known as Khurshe to keeps the feet warm and leather boots are also locally produced.

Judo is a local variation of the Jama which was popular during early modern times to cover the entire body like a gown. The sleeves, shoulders, chest and back portion of the dress are embroidered whereas the rest of the region remains white. It is accompanied by a cotton or silk Cummerbund at the waist, a white Turban on the head and a silk shawl over the shoulders. It was to be worn upon attending the darbar of the Sirmaur King in its capital Nahan as the official court uniform in old times. Nowadays, it is worn during festivals for performing folk dances.

Men used to wear jwellery such as gold earrings in both the ears known as Bunde, a silver multi-coin necklace known as Kantha and silver lion faced bracelets knows as Kade worn on both wrists and a silver or gold chain-like head jewellery attached from both of its ends on the Diguwa (turban), dangling down from and was known as Duroto. Men had stopped wearing jwellery due to colonial norms and ideals, continuing to the next generations even after independence.

Women wear Ghagra, usually a 6 to 7 meters long piece of cloth stitched together to form a long skirt and is unique due to its sharp folds known as Luria. The portion which divides the Ghagra from the Hem at the lower portion of the Ghagra is embroidered with floral patterns which forms a strip which is known as Phita. The Ghagra is paired with a Jhagga (which is Jaunsari for Kameez). It can be paired with a sleeve-less Waistcoat or it can be paired with a Kurti, an overcoat especially made for women, similar to an Angarkha. They cover their head with a Headscarf known as Dhantu, which is tied at the back of the head. For jewellery women wear Tungal, Bulak, Nāth, Utraiyan, etc. A smaller Ghagra for younger girls is known as Ghaguti. Some women had fashion tattoos on themselves, known as Kaje, which was popular until the mid-19th century.

=== Marriage ===
The marriage customs in the Jaunsari community are mostly similar to the Garhwali people, including wedding attires and rituals. Though the community is known for their unique fraternal polyandry known as Jajora. The community traces their origins of the Pandavas due to which they have tradition of brothers sharing a common wife, which was believed to be occur in order to prevent land fragmentation. Many scholars argued that the custom is similar to their neighbouring Hatti community and unique in comparison to other communities of Garhwal, which may have developed due to geographic isolation leading to lack of resources and contact with outside communities. To save marriage costs due to lack of wealth and agragarian economics, the community developed the practice of marrying brothers simultaneously.

The marriage is considered as one of the most auspicious event in the community with involvement of whole village in the wedding procession. Dowry is strictly prohibited in the community and the family demanding for dowry gets punished by the village court through fines or sometimes ostracised from the community.

== Notable people ==
- Gulab Singh, former Member of the Legislative Assembly from Chakrata.
- Jubin Nautiyal, Indian singer.
