= Lakhamandal =

Ancient temple in Uttarakhand, India

Lakhamandal Temple
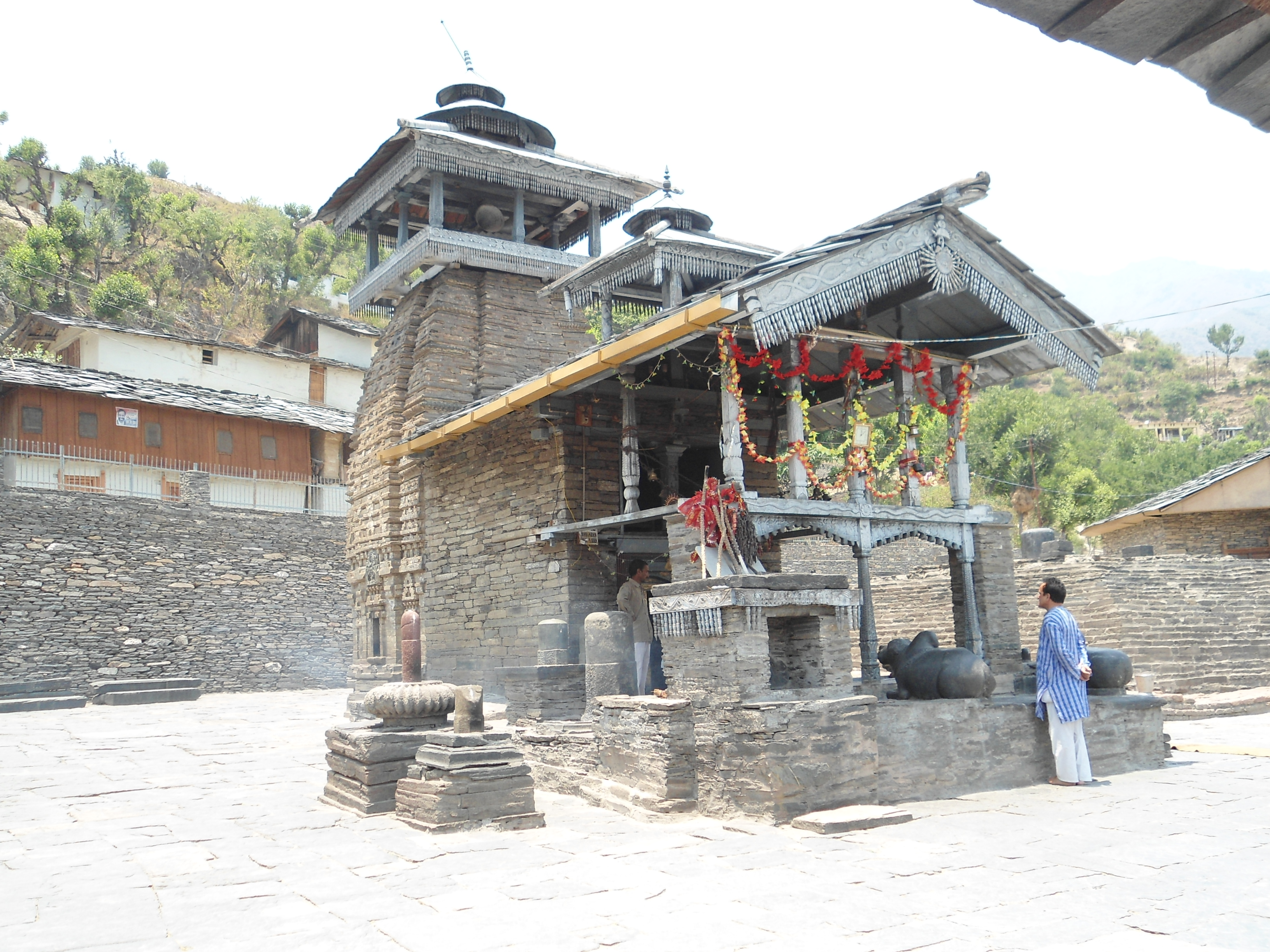

- Location in Uttarakhand

Religion
- Affiliation: Hinduism
- District: Dehradun
- Deity: Lord Shiva
- Festival: Jagra (jagran)

Location
- Location: Lakhamandal, Dehradun district
- State: Uttarakhand
- Country: India
- Interactive map of Lakhamandal Temple
- Coordinates: 30.731224°N 78.067423°E

Architecture
- Type: Huna architecture

Lakhamandal is an ancient Hindu temple complex, situated in the Jaunsar-Bawar region of Dehradun district in the state of Uttarakhand. The temple is dedicated to lord Shiva. This temple is popular among the Shaivites, who believe that a visit to this temple shrine will end their misfortunes.

Lakhamandal gets its name from the two words: lakha (Lakh) meaning "many" and mandals meaning "temples" or "lingam". Plenty of artistic works were found in the excavations by the Archaeological Survey of India.

== Location ==
This temple lies 128 km. from Dehradun, and 35 km. from Chakrata on the Mussoorie-Yamnotri road, past Kempty Falls. It is built in North Indian Architectural style, which is common in the hilly regions of Garhwal and Himachal Pradesh state. The Yamuna River flows alongside Lakhamandal village where the temple is situated.

== Ancient Temple & Remains ==
This NAGARA style temple of Lord Shiva was built in circa 12th - 13th century CE. A large number of sculptures and architectural members are spread in the vicinity suggest the remains of more shrines of the same cult in the past but presently only this temple is survived. The earliest evidence of structural activity at Lakhamandal goes back to circa 5th-8th century CE, on the basis of bricks structure noticed below stones build the pyramidal structure. A stone inscription (6th century CE) of the site records the construction of Shiva temple at Lakhamandal by princess Ishwara, who belongs to the royal race of Singhpura, for the spiritual welfare of her late husband Chandragupta, the son of the king of Jalandhar. - Superintending Archaeologist (Archaeological Survey of India)

== Lingam ==
The main attraction of this temple shrine is the graphite Lingam. It shines when wet and reflects its surroundings.

== Legend and the cave ==
According to the local people, this temple and the adjoining area are believed to be where Duryodhana of Mahabharata episode conspired to burn alive the Pandava in the Lakshyagriha house, constructed with shellac.

Twin statues of Danav and Manav are located beside the main shrine. The statues are its dwarpals (doormen). Some people believe these statues to be those of Pandava brothers Bhima and Arjuna. But according to archeological survey of India one of these sculptures has a defaced epigraph in front of its base which seems to read vijayah resembling Jai and Vijay, the doormen of Lord Vishnu.

Another cave near this place is called Dhundhi Odaari in the local Jaunsari language. Dhundi or Dhund means "misty" or "foggy" and odaar or odaari means "cave" or "hidden place". The local people think that the Pandava took refuge in this cave to save themselves from Duryodhana.

== Gallery ==
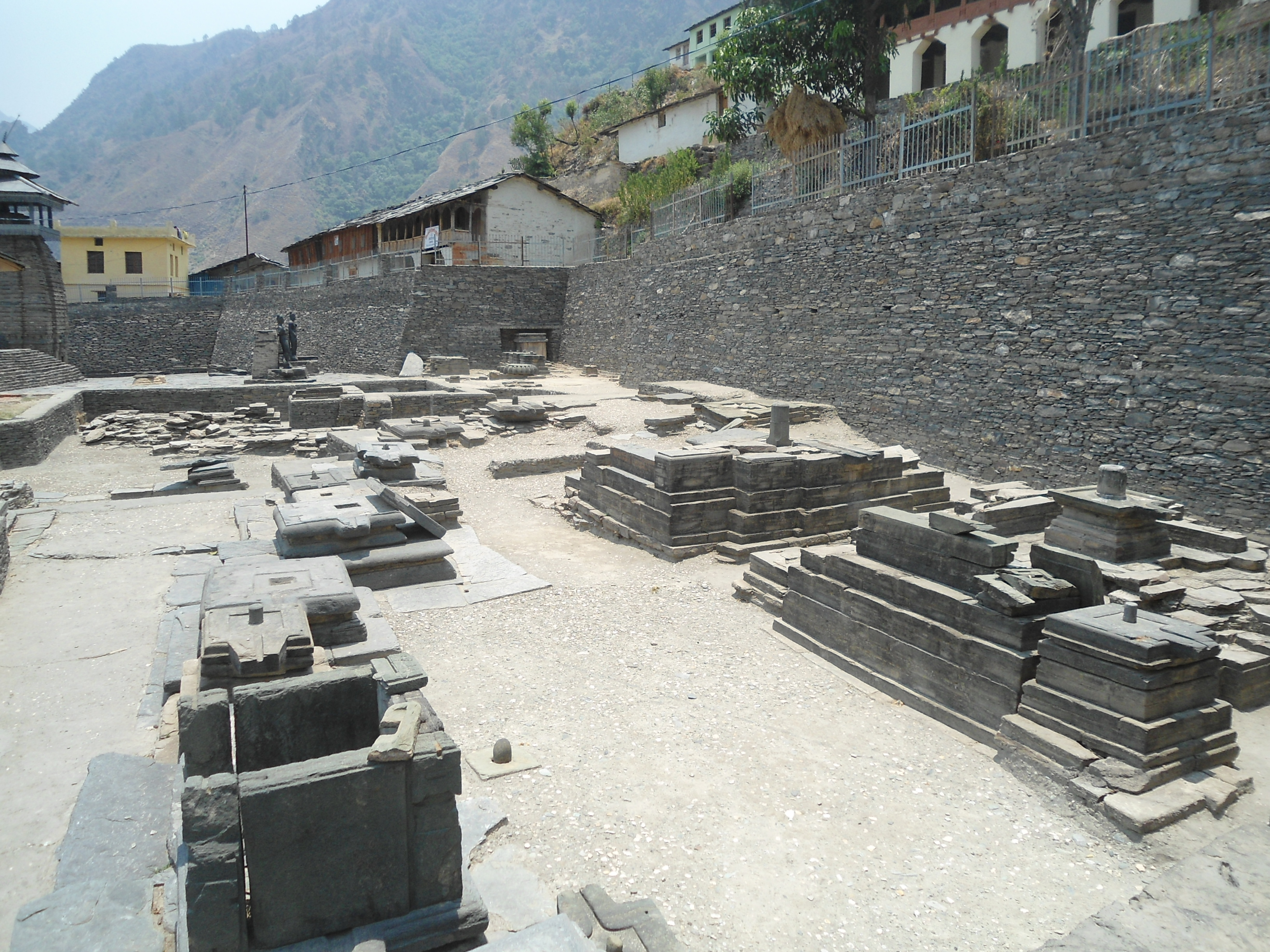
Mandals at Lakhamandal Temple

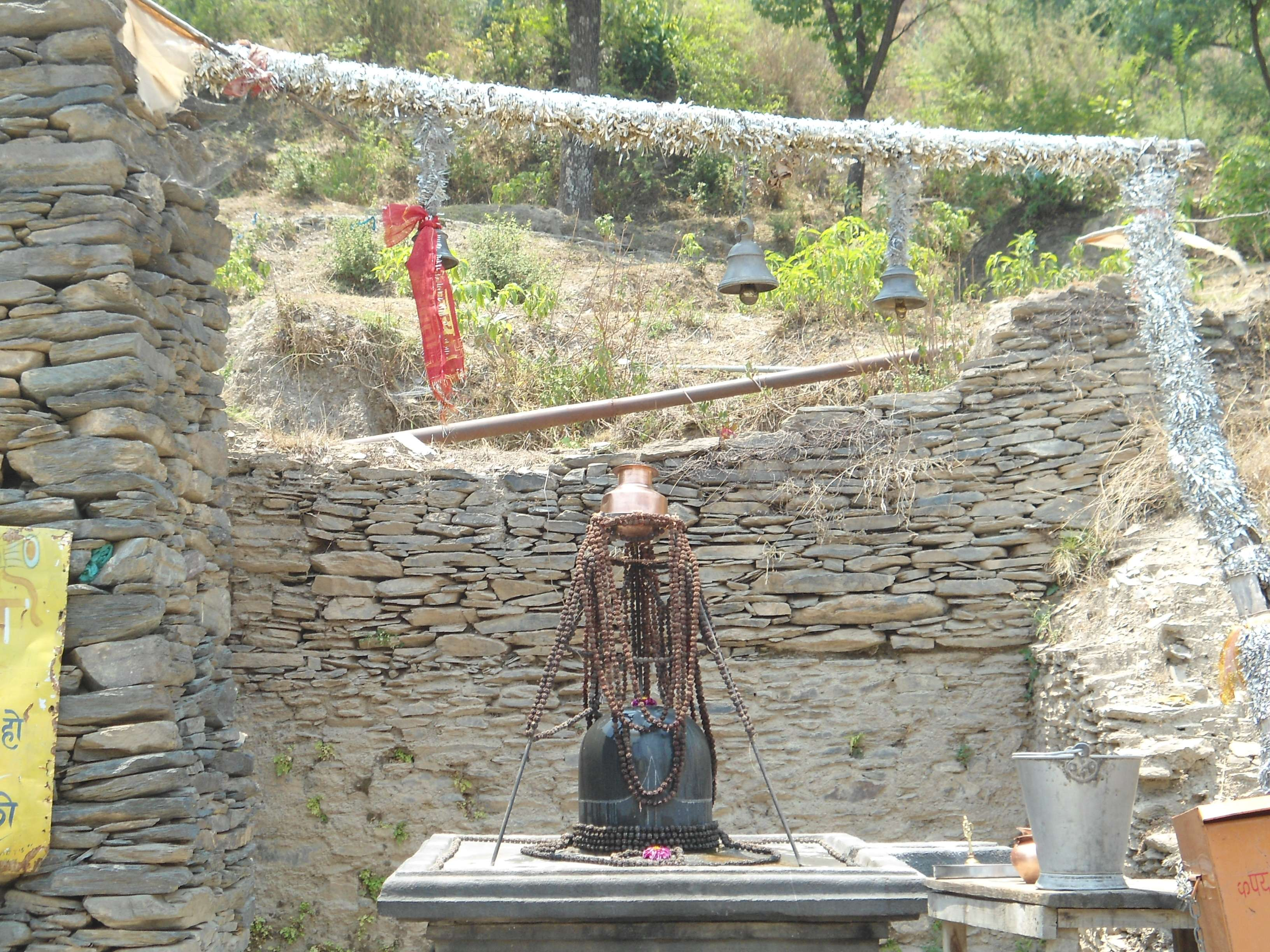
Graphite Lingam at the Lakhamandal Temple

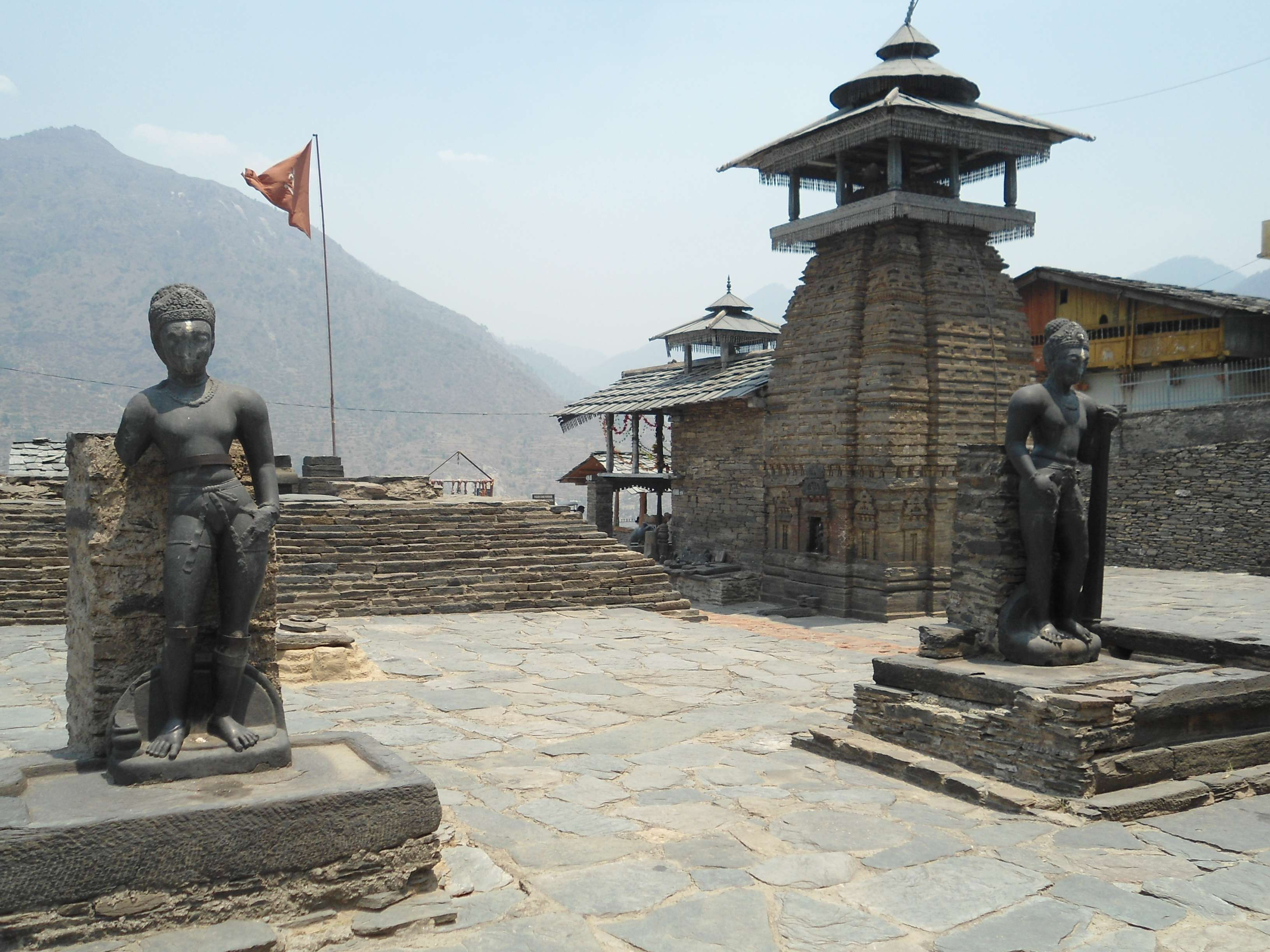
Danav Manav

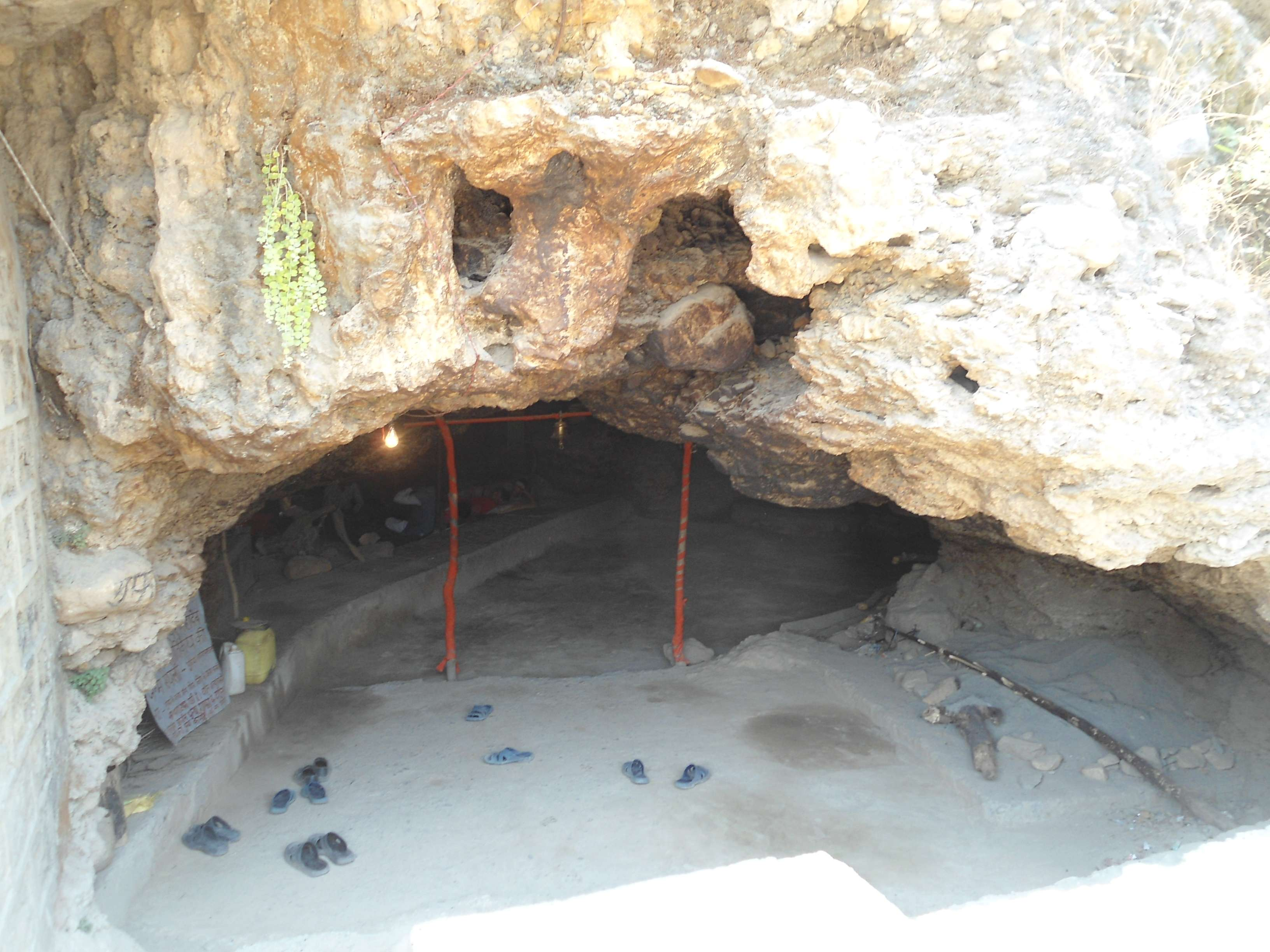
The cave near the Lakhamandal Temple

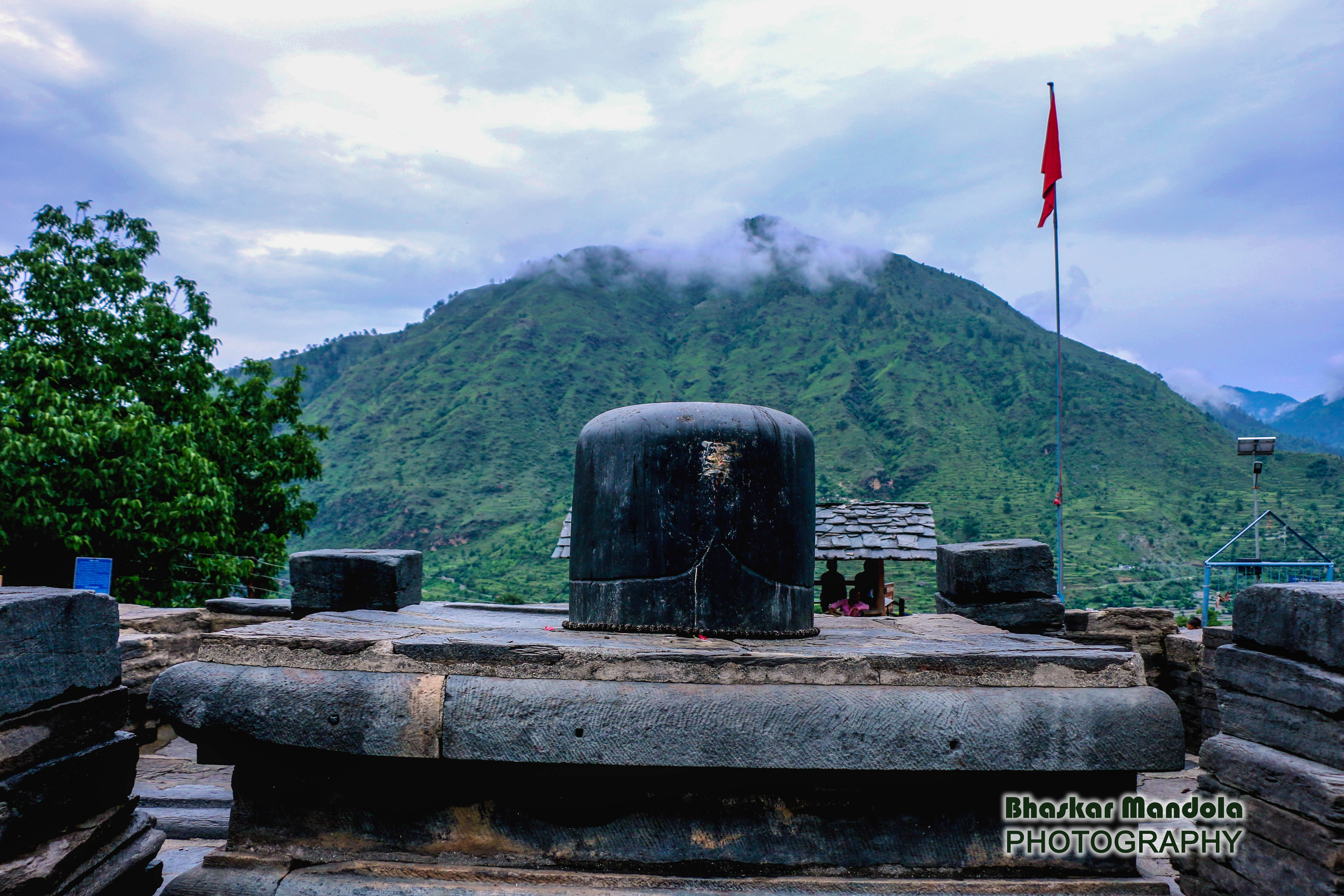

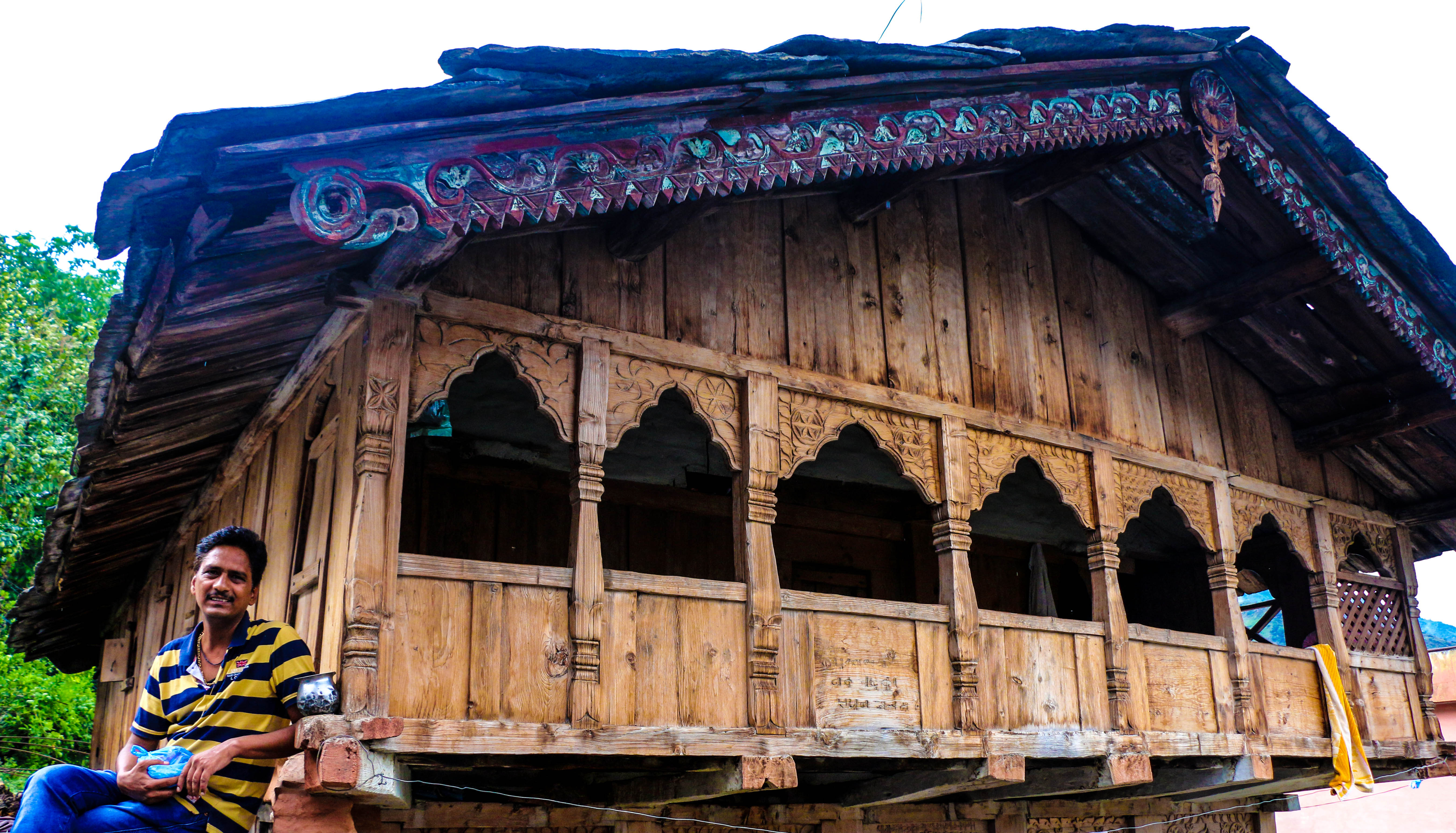

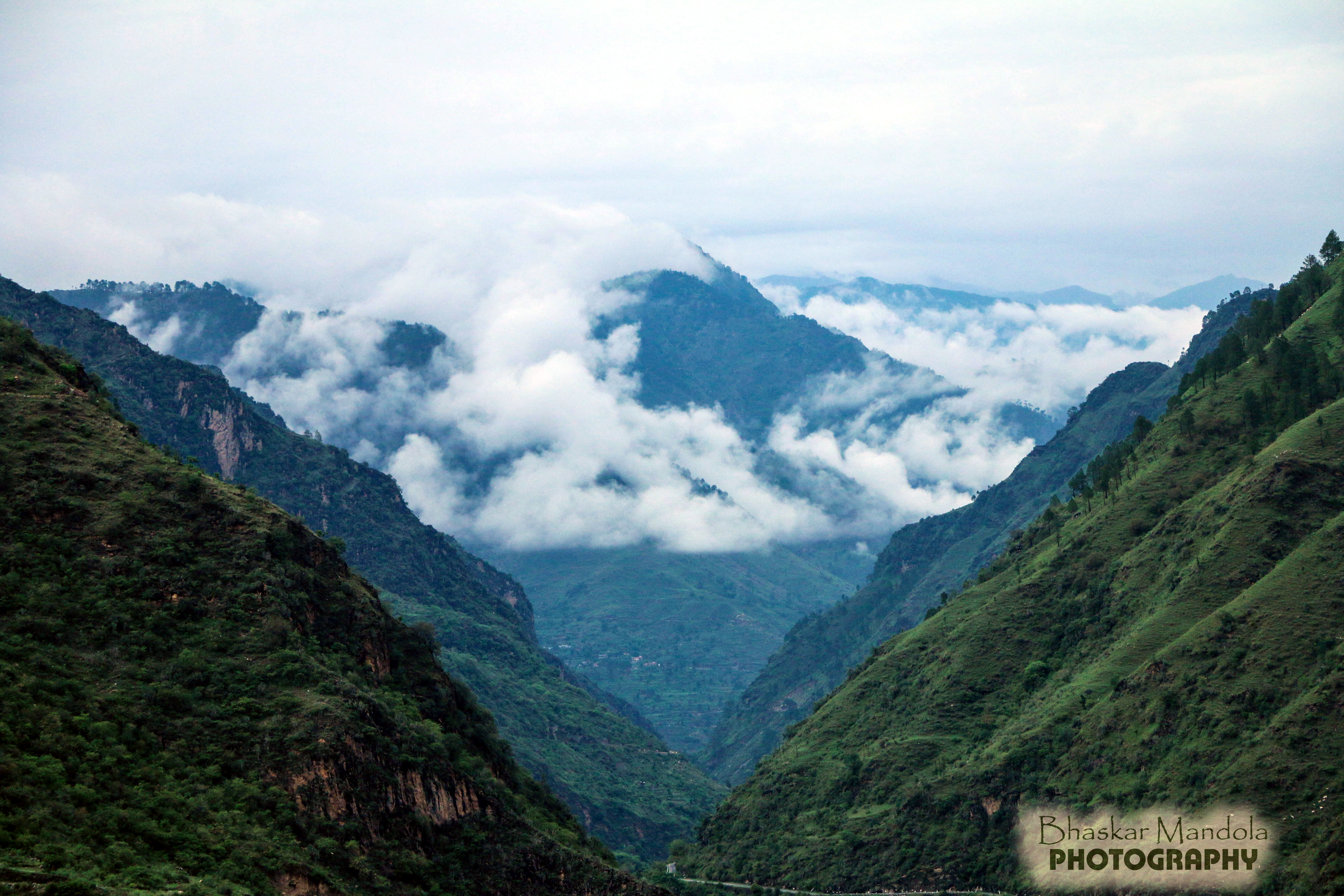

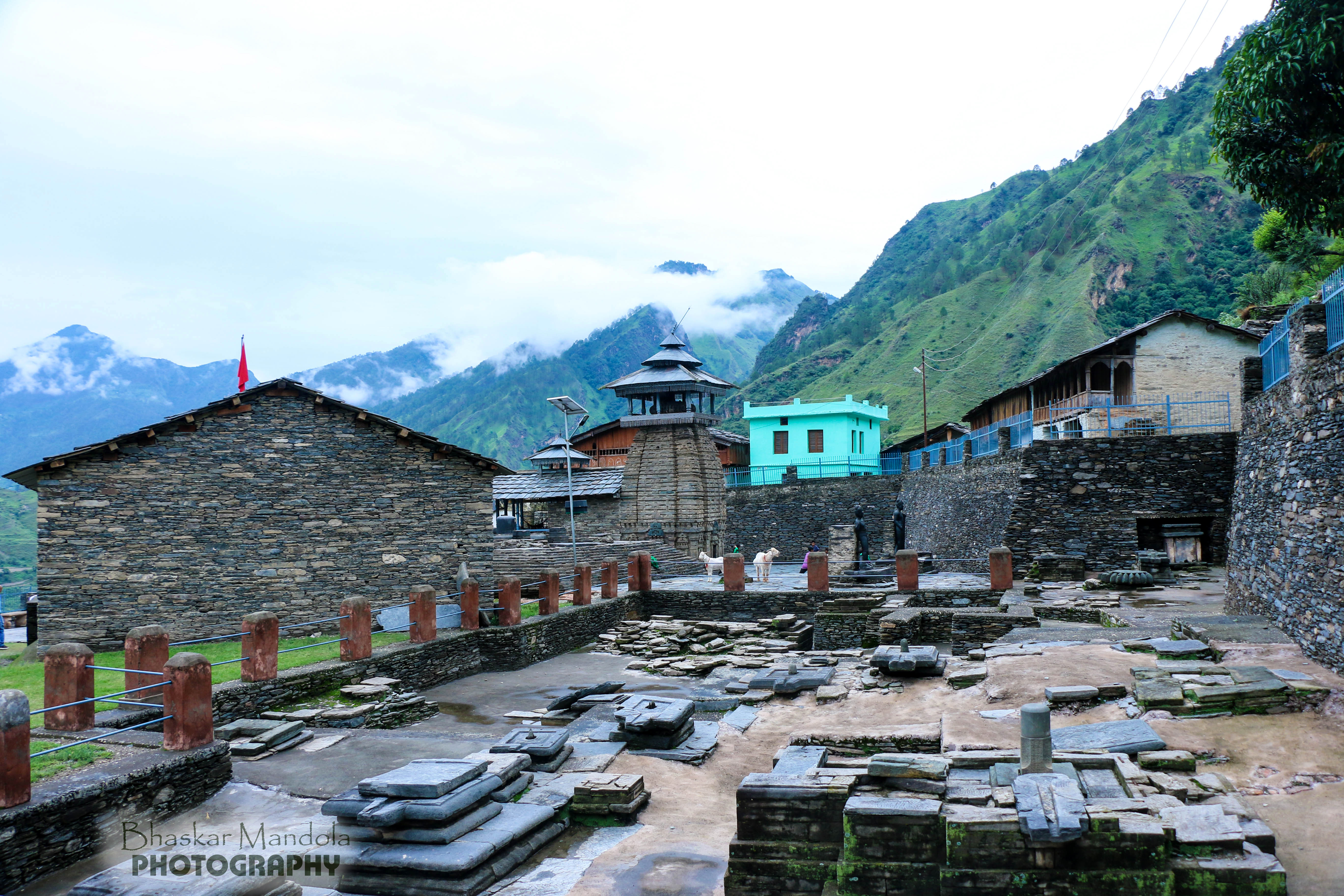

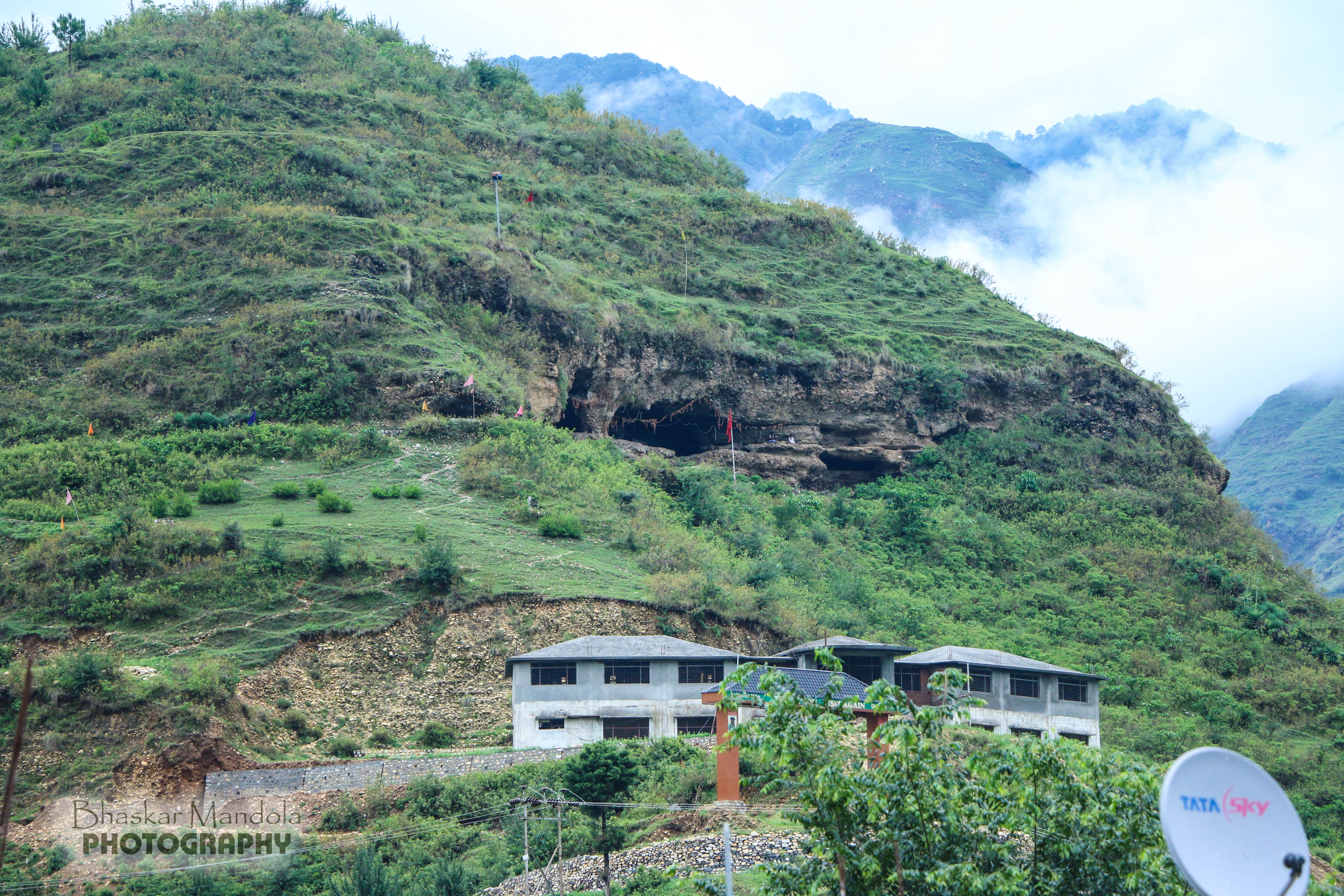

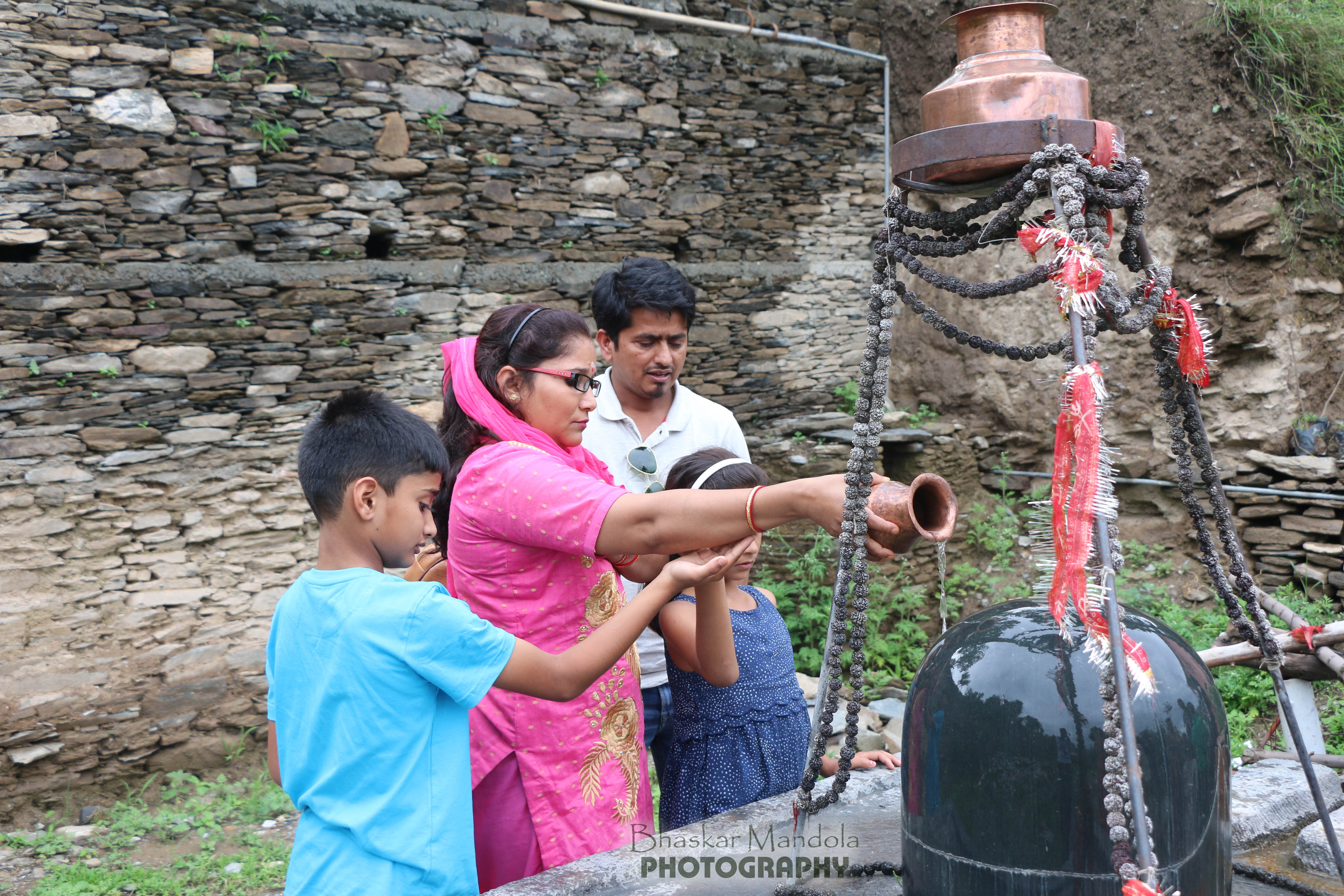

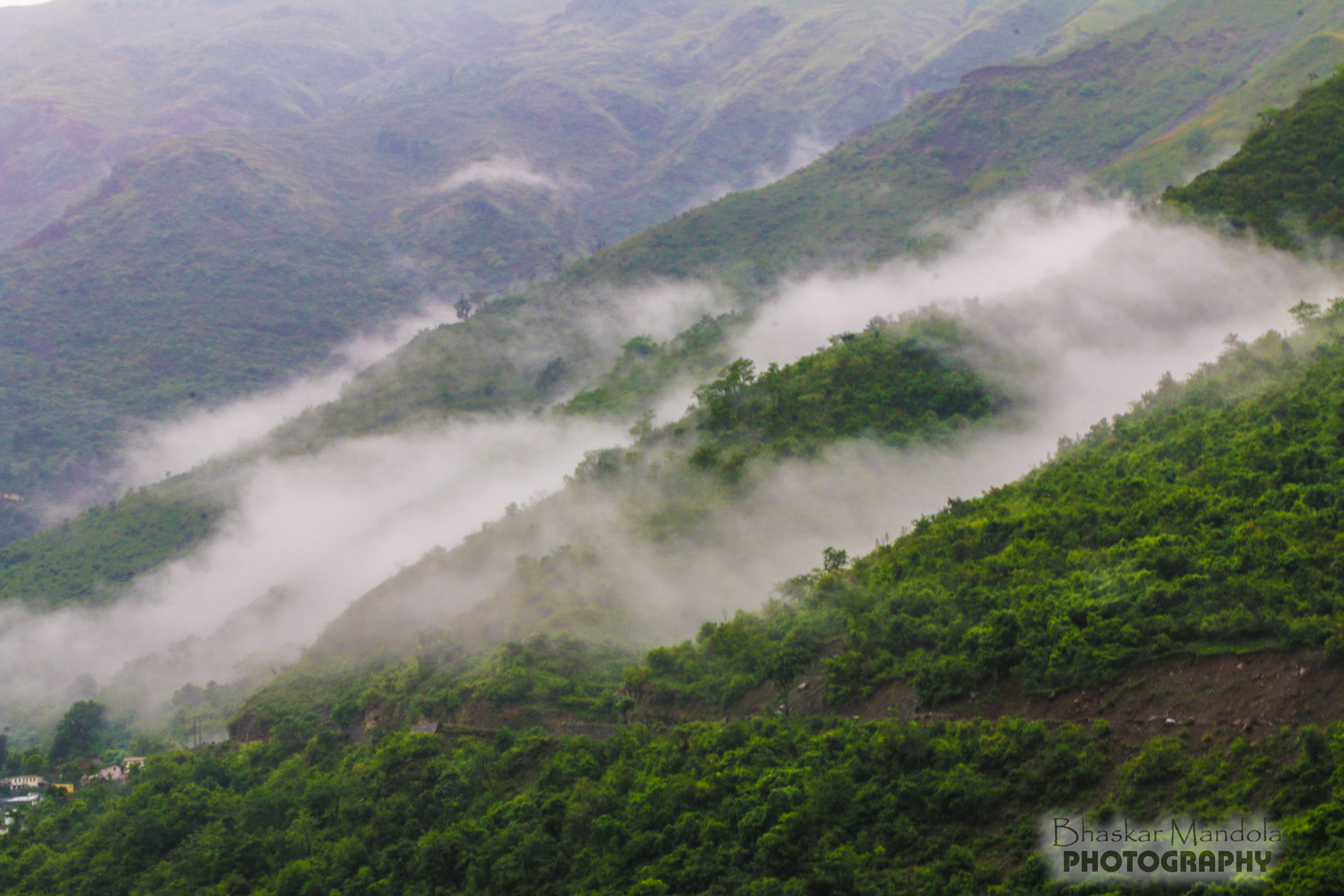

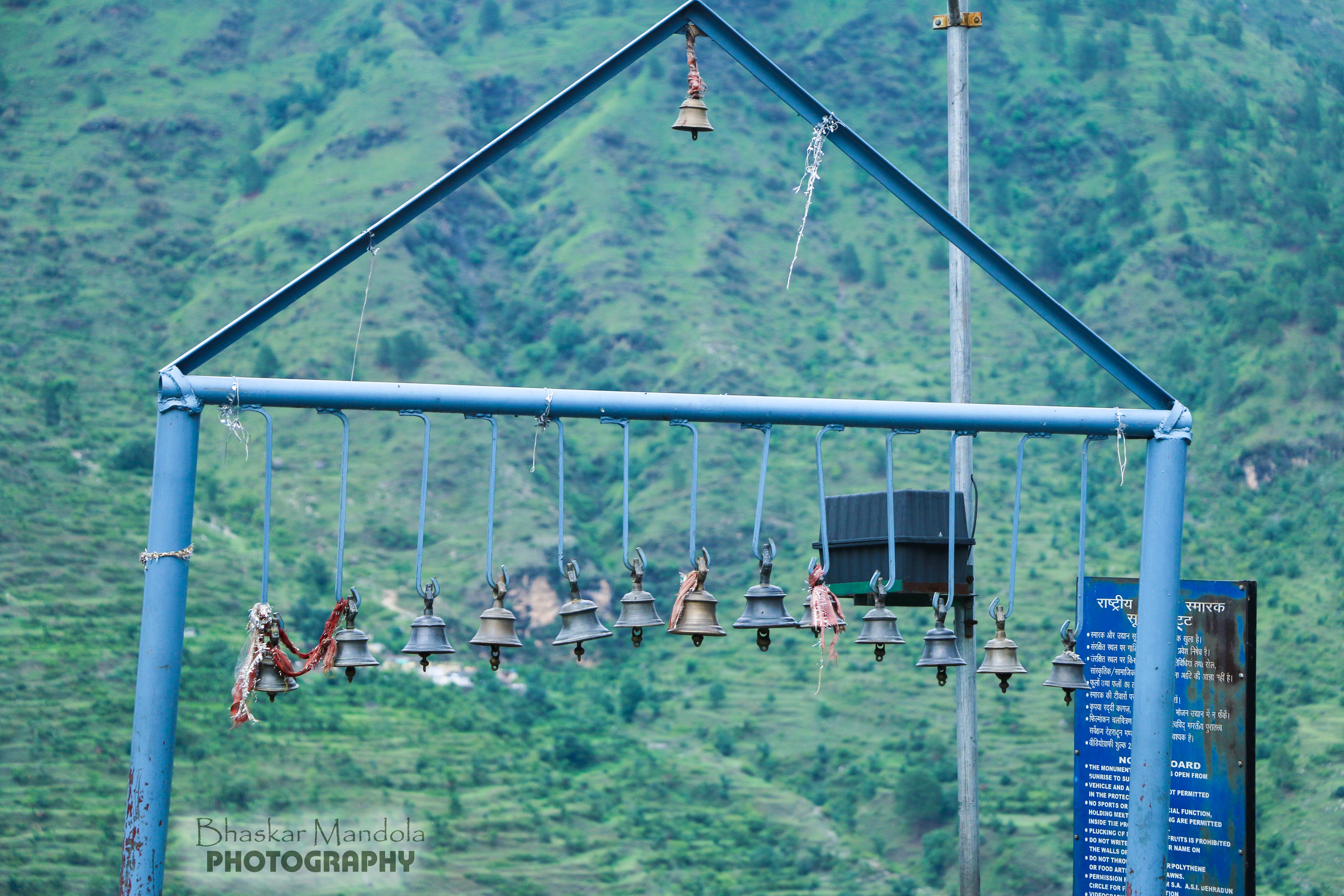

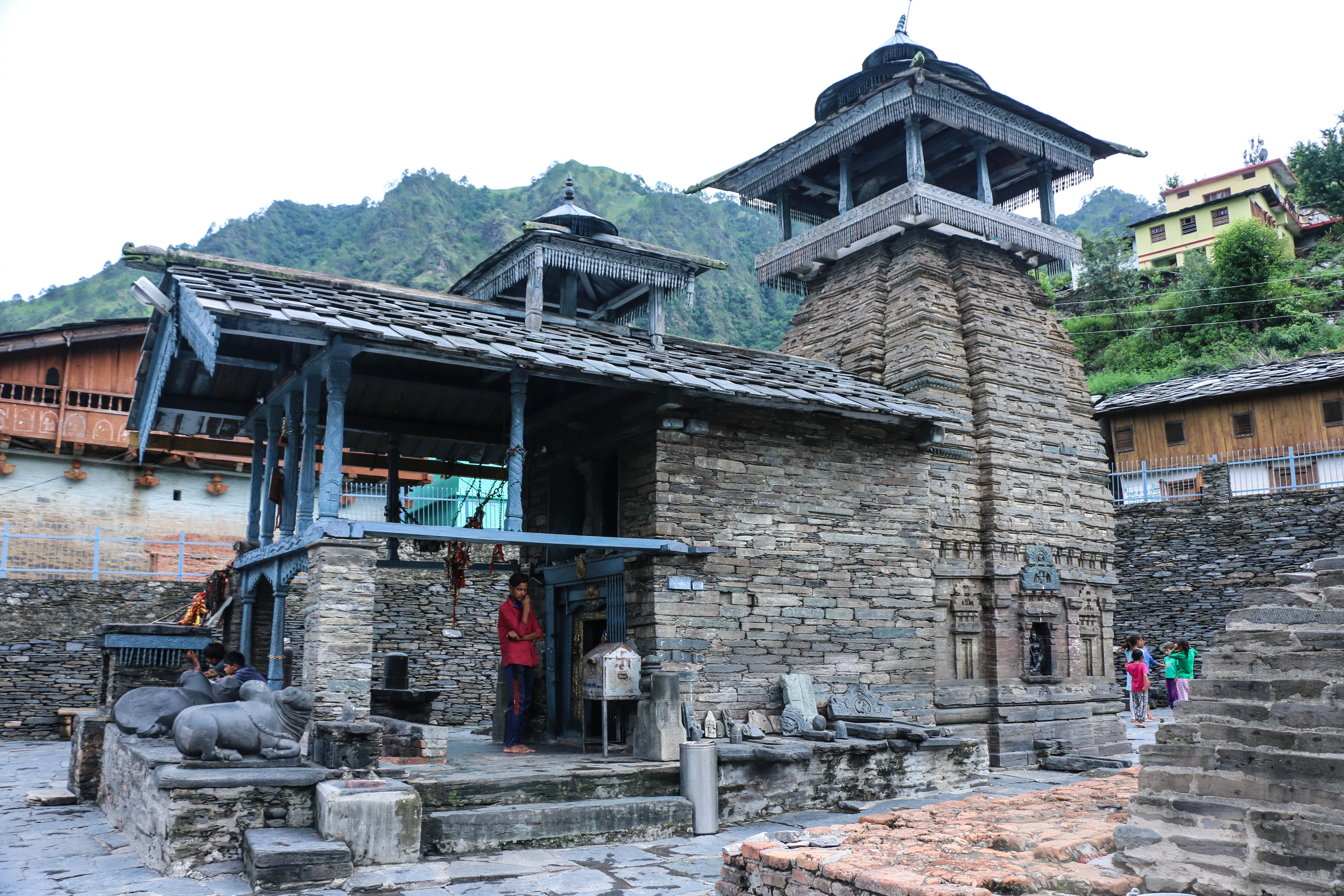
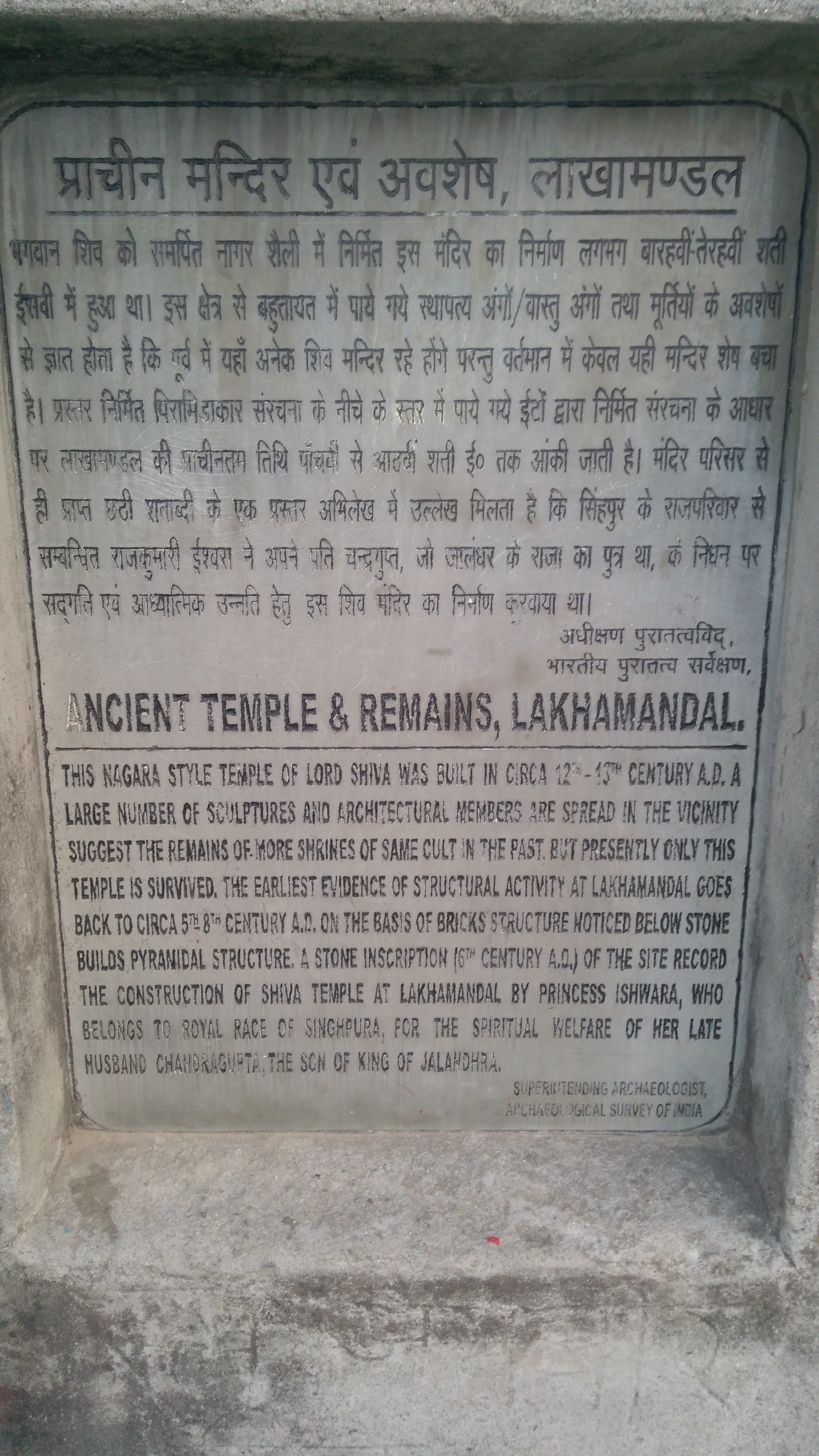
article by Superintending Archaeologist (Archaeological Survey of India)
