= Negi (surname) =

- Language: Dogri, Kumaoni, Garhwali, Kinnauri

Origin
- Region of origin: Uttarakhand, Himachal Pradesh

Other names
- See also: Parmar (Panwar), Rautela, Bisht, Bhandari, Rana

Negi is a title of Pahadi Thakurs. The Negi title originated from the word nek which means 'righteous'. This title was conferred by kings upon warriors, military commanders and ministers. Individuals holding the Negi title were entrusted with the task of collecting taxes from villages as some of them were zaildars and Lambardars too.

== Notable people ==
- Asha Negi, television actress
- Birbal Negi, commander in the Kumaon Kingdom
- Balwant Singh Negi, army officer
- Darwan Singh Negi, Victoria Cross recipient
- Deependra Negi, footballer
- Dev Negi, singer
- Dhan Singh Negi, former MLA for Tehri
- Gabar Singh Negi, Victoria Cross recipient
- Jagat Singh Negi, politician
- Jaiveer Singh Negi, army officer
- Janardan Ganpatrao Negi, scientist
- Jeet Singh Negi, composer
- Jhagad Singh Negi, the last known ruler of Koligarh
- Kabiraj Negi Lama – team coach for Nepal at the 2020 Summer Paralympics and 2024 Summer Paralympics
- Kunwar Singh Negi, Braille editor and social worker
- Lodi Rikhola Negi, 17th-century general in the Garhwal Kingdom
- Mir Ranjan Negi, former national field hockey player for India
- Nalini Negi, television actress and model
- Nantram Negi, legendary Jaunsari warrior
- Narender Negi, cricketer
- Narendra Singh Negi, Garhwali folk singer
- Parimarjan Negi, chess grandmaster
- Pawan Negi, Indian international cricketer
- Ravinder Singh Negi, Indian politician
- S. K. S. Negi, army officer
- Shyam Saran Negi, Indian schoolteacher and ECI ambassador
- Trepan Singh Negi, former Member of Parliament for Tehri
- Ritu Negi, Indian kabaddi player
- Renu Negi, Indian filmmaker
- Surendra Singh Negi, Indian politician
- Chandra Mohan Singh Negi, Indian politician
