= Nantram Negi =

Commander of Sirmur state

- Born: 1756; Jaunsar-Bawar, Sirmaur Kingdom (present-day Uttarakhand, India)
- Died: 1781 (aged 24–25)
- Occupation: Military leader
- Known for: Battles against Mughal and Rohilla forces
- Title: Veer

Nantram Negi (also known as Nati Ram Negi'); born 1756 – died 1781) was a legendary Jaunsari warrior from the Jaunsar-Bawar region (present-day Uttarakhand, India). He is remembered for his bravery against Mughal and other invading forces and holds a revered place in local folk songs, oral histories, and regional traditions.

== Early life ==
Nantram Negi was born in 1756 in the village of Maleth (or Berat Khai) in the Jaunsar-Bawar region of the Sirmaur Kingdom. From an early age, he showed exceptional skills in traditional combat and martial arts.

== Military career ==
Nantram Negi joined the forces of Raja Shamsher Prakash of Sirmaur, quickly rising to the rank of a battalion leader due to his bravery. He led successful campaigns against Mughal armies along the Yamuna River in the Paonta Dun region, famously beheading a Mughal commander during a critical battle, forcing enemy troops to retreat.

In 1781, he fought against the Rohilla forces led by Ghulam Qadir Khan. Nantram infiltrated the enemy camp at Rehri Sadar and beheaded the Rohilla commander. He was martyred in the battle, earning everlasting fame in the region.

== Legacy ==
Nantram Negi is celebrated in Jaunsari folklore through songs (known as Harul) and the traditional Harul Rasa dance. Annual commemorations and rituals are performed in his memory, especially in his native village of Maleth and temples.

His bravery is still sung in the folk songs and oral traditions of Jaunsar-Bawar. In many temples, swords and other arms are worshipped in his honor.

== In popular culture ==
Nantram Negi remains a significant figure in regional folk culture. Folk songs such as Negi Nati Ram Harul and cultural programs often narrate his heroic acts.
