= Chakrata =

- Hill Town
- Interactive map of Chakrata
- Country: India
- State: Uttarakhand
- District: Dehradun
- Elevation: 2,118 m (6,949 ft)

Population (2011)
  - Total: 49,607

Languages
  - Official: Hindi
  - Native: Jaunsari
- Time zone: UTC+5:30 (IST)
- Vehicle registration: UK
- Website: uk.gov.in

Chakrata is a cantonment town and also a sub district/tehsil, in Dehradun district in the state of Uttarakhand, India.

It lies between the Tons and Yamuna rivers, at an elevation of 2118 m, 98 km from the state capital, Dehradun. Chakrata was originally a cantonment of the British Indian Army. To the west lies Shillai, Himachal Pradesh, and to the east are Mussoorie (73 km) and Tehri Garhwal.

== History ==
The area is known as Jaunsar-Bawar,

In 1901, Chakrata Tehsil was part of the Dehradun district, of United Provinces, with a collective population of 51,101, which consisted of the towns of Chakrata (population 1250) and Kalsi, with a population of 760, which is most known for the rock edict of the Mauryan king Ashoka 2nd century BC, first discovered by John Forest, in 1860.

== The cantonment ==
A cantonment of British Indian Army, was established in 1869 by Colonel Hume of the 55th Regiment, British Indian Army, and the troops and officers first occupied the cantonment in April 1869.

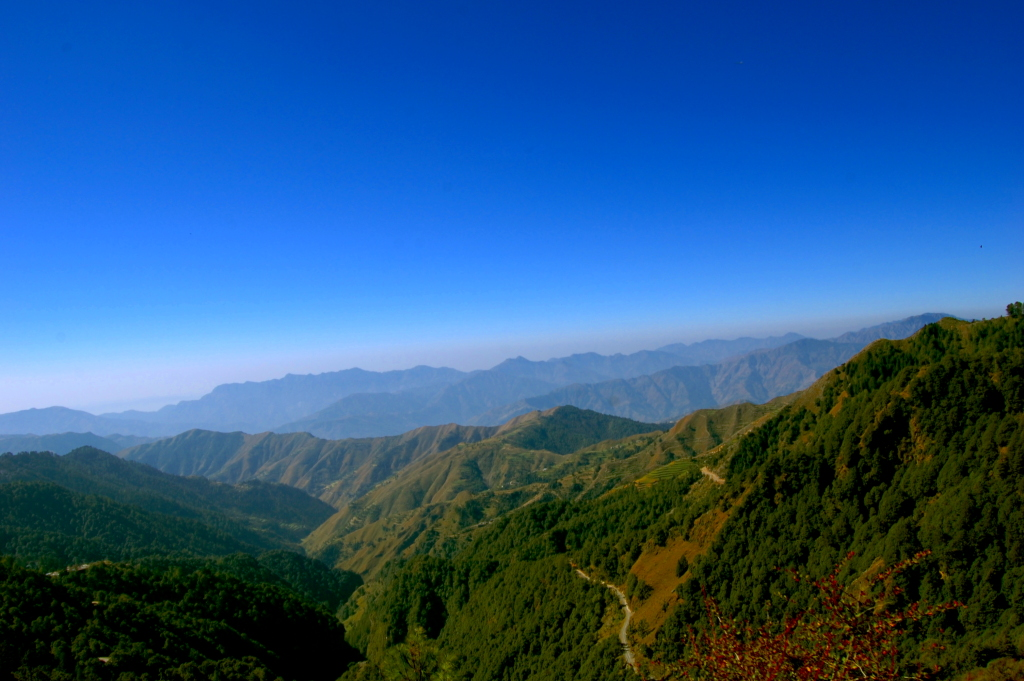
View from Deoban of Chakrata

Chakrata is an access-restricted military cantonment, and foreigners face severe restrictions in visiting. Notably, it is the permanent garrison of the Special Frontier Force. Weapons and survival training is also imparted by other intelligence services in Chakrata, in support of Indian foreign policy goals, especially pertaining to other countries in the Indian Subcontinent.

== Tourism and transportation ==
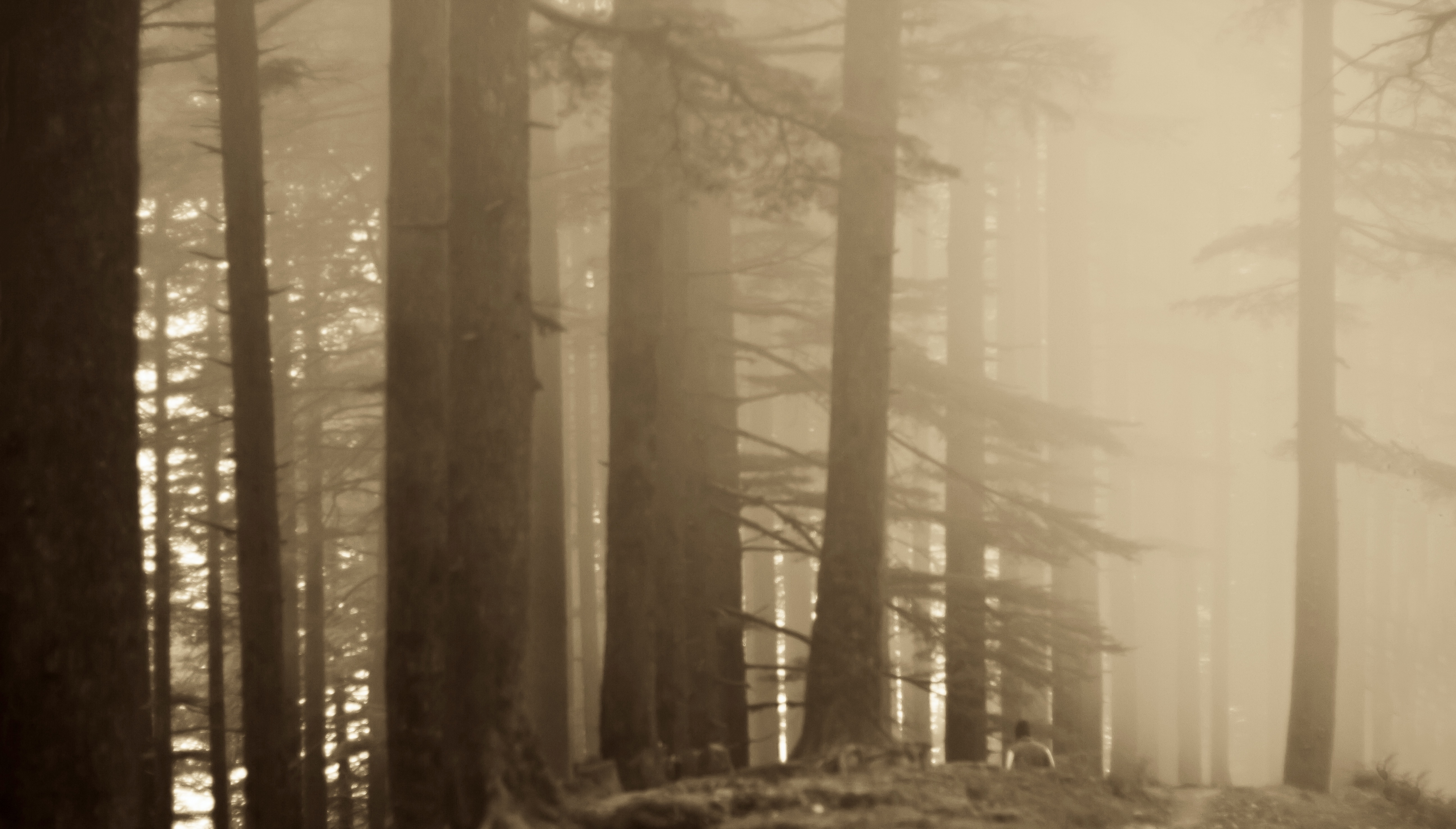
Misty mornings at Budher forest rest house

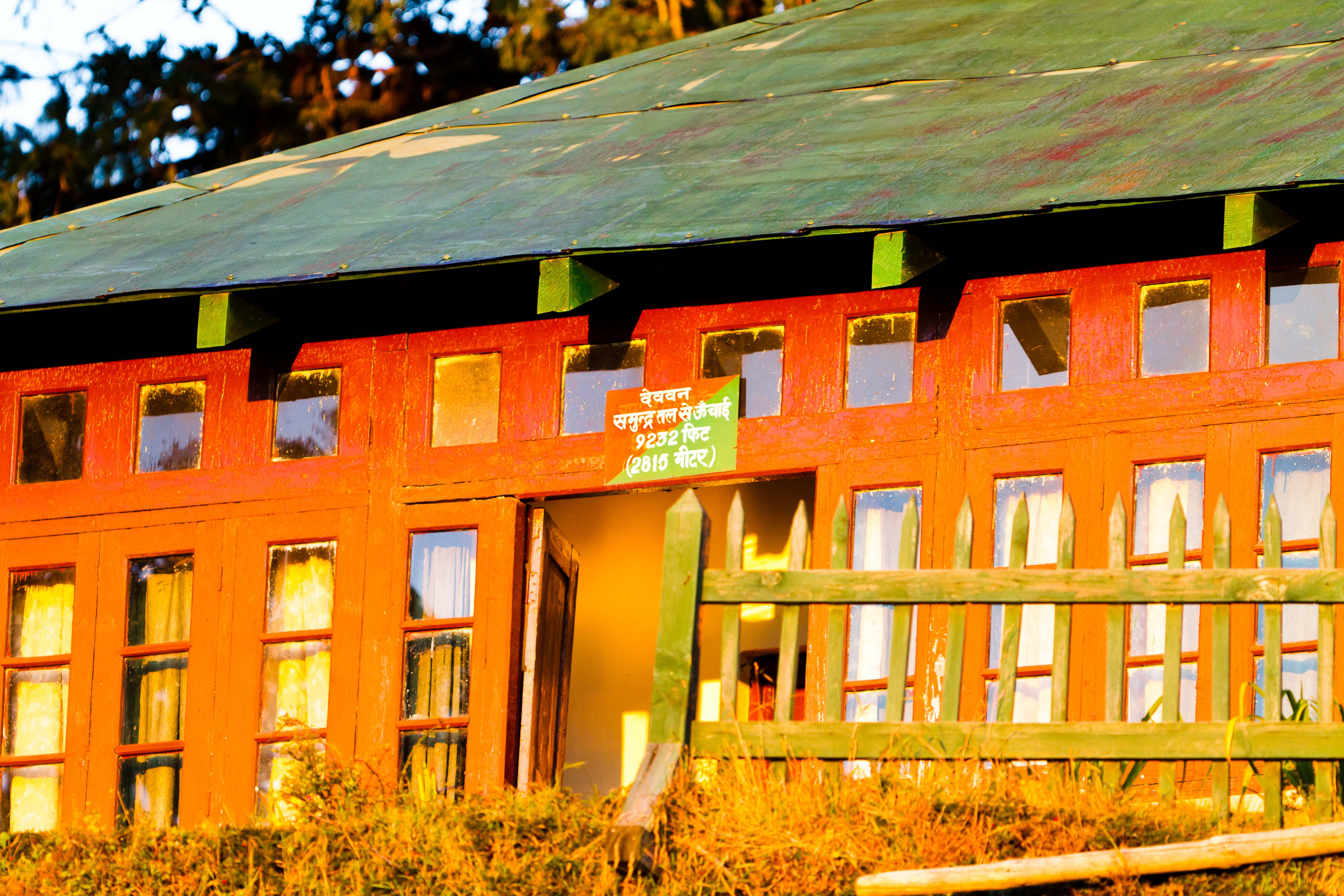
Forest Rest House – Deoban

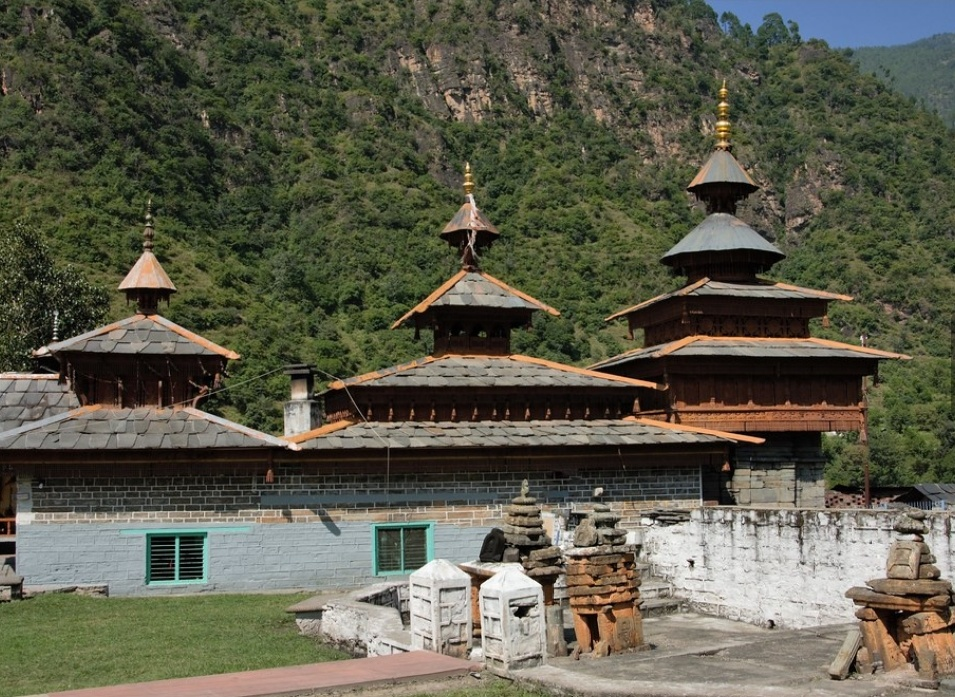
Ancient Wooden Mahasu Devta Temple at Hanol.

Chakrata can be reached from Dehradun via Mussoorie or Vikasnagar passing through Kalsi Gate.

- Tiger Falls is one of the highest direct waterfalls in Uttarakhand. It is 20 km from Chakrata and has an elevation of 312 ft.
- Lakhamandal is an ancient Hindu temple complex dedicated to Shiva and associated with the Pandavas. It is an Archaeological Survey of India protected site.
- Manjhgaon is an ancient Hindu temple dedicated to Lord Shiva. It is called Massu Devta in regional language. It is 15 kilometres from Chakrata market. It is the oldest temple in the region.

== Demographics ==
As of 2011 India census, Chakrata town falls under 15.70 square km. There are 759 households, and urban Chakrata has a population of 5,117 of which males are 3,717 (73%) and females 1,400 (27%). 73% of the population falls under the general category, while 11% are from schedule caste and 17% are schedule tribes. Child (aged under 6 years) population of Chakrata (CB) cantonment board is 7%, among them 54% are boys and 46% are girls. There are 759 households in the city and an average 7 persons live in every family. 84% of the population (4,293 persons) is 'literate'.

The sub-district Chakrata has a total population of 67,258, with 34,938 males and 32,320 females. The total area of the sub-district is 542.59 square km. Apart from the area under the cantonment board, Chakrata falls under the 'rural' category. In the sub-district, the demographics are starkly different from the urban area, with Scheduled Castes being 34.6% (23,265 persons), and Scheduled Tribes being 54.9% (36,919 persons) to the total population. 51.2% of the population, i.e. 34,440 persons are 'literate'.

== Civic Administration ==
The urban area of Chakrata falls under the jurisdiction of the Urban Local Body in Chakrata, the Cantonment Board (CB). There are 6 wards. The cantonment board consists of 12 members, including 6 elected members.

== See also ==
- Buraswa
