= Koligarh =

Koligarh, also spelled Koligad or Koligadh, is a castle in Basrambu Patti of Garhwal in Uttarakhand, India. It is one of the fifty two castles of Garhwal. It was ruled by Jhagad Singh Negi who was its last ruler because he was defeated by first ruler of Garhwal Kingdom Ajay Pal and annexed in it.

== See also ==
- Koliwara
