= List of Scheduled Tribes in Uttarakhand =

The Scheduled Tribes in Uttarakhand comprise 5 tribes, with a population of 2,91,903, constituting 2.9% of the state's population according to the 2011 census.

== List of Scheduled Tribes ==
Tribes in bold indicate Particularly Vulnerable Tribal Group (Primitive Tribe).

- Bhotiyas
- **Buksa**
- Jaunsari
- **Raji**
- Tharu

== Demographics ==
Population of Scheduled Tribes as per 2011 census of India.

| Scheduled Tribe | | Language | Population | |
| ST Code | Tribe | Language | (as of 2011) | %age |
|---|---|---|---|---|
| 001 | Bhotia | Bhoti | 39,106 | 13.39% |
| 002 | Buksa | Buksa | 54,037 | 18.51% |
| 003 | Jaunsari | Jaunsari | 88,664 | 30.37% |
| 004 | Raji | Raji | 690 | 0.24% |
| 005 | Tharu | Tharu | 91,342 | 31.29% |
| Generic tribes, etc. (those who identified them as Adivasi, Vanvasi, Girijan or Anushuchit Janjati) | | | 18,064 | 6.2% |
| Total | | | 291,903 | 100% |

=== Population by district ===
| District | | Scheduled Tribes | | |
| Name | Total population | Population | Percent | Largest Tribe (Top 3) |
|---|---|---|---|---|
| Uttarkashi | 3,30,086 | 3,521 | 1.06% | Bhotia (2,061); Jaunsari (1,089); Buksa (75) |
| Chamoli | 3,91,605 | 12,260 | 3.14% | Bhotia (10,219); Jaunsari (57); Tharu (23) |
| Rudraprayag | 2,42,285 | 386 | 0.16% | Bhotia (134); Jaunsari (7), Buksa (6) |
| Tehri Garhwal | 6,18,931 | 875 | 0.14% | Jaunsari (313); Bhotia (107); Tharu (74) |
| Dehradun | 16,96,694 | 1,11,663 | 6.58% | Jaunsari (86,516); Buksa (17,684); Bhotia (2,123) |
| Garhwal | 6,87,271 | 2,215 | 0.32% | Buksa (1,416); Bhotia (241); Jaunsari (97) |
| Pithoragarh | 4,83,439 | 19,535 | 4.04% | Bhotia (18,115); Raji (382), Tharu (93) |
| Bageshwar | 2,59,898 | 1,982 | 0.76% | Bhotia (1,553); Tharu (44), Jaunsari (9) |
| Almora | 6,22,506 | 1,281 | 0.21% | Bhotia (939), Tharu (25); Jaunsari (19) |
| Champawat | 2,59,648 | 1,339 | 0.52% | Tharu (720); Bhotia (295); Raji (127) |
| Nainital | 9,52,605 | 7,495 | 0.79% | Buksa (3,694); Bhotia (2,271); Tharu (575) |
| Udham Singh Nagar | 16,42,908 | 1,23,037 | 7.49% | Tharu (89,399); Buksa (27,609); Bhotia (853) |
| Haridwar | 18,90,422 | 6,323 | 0.33% | Buksa (3,600); Jaunsari (268); Tharu (123) |
| Total | 10,086,292 | 291,903 | 2.89% | |

== See also ==
- List of Scheduled Tribes
- List of Scheduled Castes in Uttarakhand
