= Lodi Rikhola Negi =

Commander of Garhwal

Rikhola Lodi
- Born: Bayeli, Badalpur Patti, Garhwal Kingdom
- Relatives: Rikhola(Negi)
- Military career
- Allegiance: Garhwal Kingdom
- Branch: Rikhola(Negi) clan
- Rank: Commander
- Conflicts: Defense of Doon Valley; Campaigns against Sirmur and Kumaon
- Awards: Jagir (land grant) in Khairasain and Badalpur region
- Other work: Local administration and fortification projects

Lodi Rikhola (also referred to as Rikhola Lodi Negi) was a prominent 17th-century general in the Garhwal Kingdom in present-day Uttarakhand, India. He served under King Mahipat Shah (r. 1625–1646) and played a key role in defending the kingdom’s western frontier, especially around the Doon Valley. His military service and local reforms are noted in both historical sources and Garhwali oral traditions.

== Career ==
Rikhola Lodi was one of three main generals in Mahipat Shah’s army, alongside Madho Singh Bhandari and Banwari Dass. He was entrusted with safeguarding the western and southwestern frontiers of Garhwal following the death of King Shyam Shah (r. 1611–1625).

Lodi led successful military campaigns to repel the joint invasion of Garhwal by the rulers of Sirmur and Kumaon, allegedly aided by Emperor Jahangir’s forces around 1620–21. He not only defeated the invading armies but also stabilized the region by constructing boundary pillars and eliminating bandit groups operating near Chakrata and Kalsi.

His actions helped fortify Garhwal’s territorial claims over the Doon Valley and prevented further Mughal expansion into the region.

== Legacy ==
Though lesser known than Madho Singh Bhandari, Rikhola Lodi holds an important place in local Garhwali traditions. Bards and historians have preserved his memory for his courage, administration, and defense of Garhwal’s sovereignty.

In Bhakt Darshan's work Gadhwal ki Divangat Vibhutiyan, Lodi is remembered as one of the “divangat vibhutiyan” (departed luminaries) of Garhwal, praised for his military service and loyalty to the Garhwali throne. The book specifically refers to him as Rikhola Lodi Negi, confirming his clan identity.

== See also ==
- History of Uttarakhand
- Garhwal Kingdom
