= Jhagad Singh Negi =

Last ruler of Koligarh fort in Garhwal, India

- Ruler of Koligarh
- Reign: 15th–16th century (exact dates unknown)
- Predecessor: Unknown
- Successor: Ajay Pal, (annexed into Garhwal Kingdom)
- Died: Garhwal (present‑day Uttarakhand)
- Dynasty: local chieftain
- Religion: Hinduism

Jhagad Singh Negi was the last known ruler of Koligarh (also spelled Koligad or Koligadh) in the Garhwal region of present‑day Uttarakhand, India. Koligarh was one of the traditional fifty‑two forts of Garhwal.

== Biography ==
Koligarh was located in Basrambu Patti of Garhwal. During the 15th–16th century, local forts and small chiefdoms were gradually unified under Ajay Pal, the first ruler of the Garhwal Kingdom. Jhagad Singh Negi, the ruler of Koligarh, was defeated by Ajay Pal, and the fort was annexed into the kingdom.

== See also ==
- Garhwal Kingdom
