= Colone =

Colone may refer to:

- Bartolo Colón (born 1973), Dominican-American professional baseball
- Joe Colone (1924–2009), American professional basketball player
- Ann Colone (1930–2007), American radio and television broadcaster
- Adam de Colone (c. 1572 – 1651), Dutch painter active in Scotland
- Carlos Colone (born 1979), Puerto Rican and Canadian professional wrestler better known internationally by his ring name Carlito

== See also ==
- Colón (currency)
