= Jaunsar-Bawar =

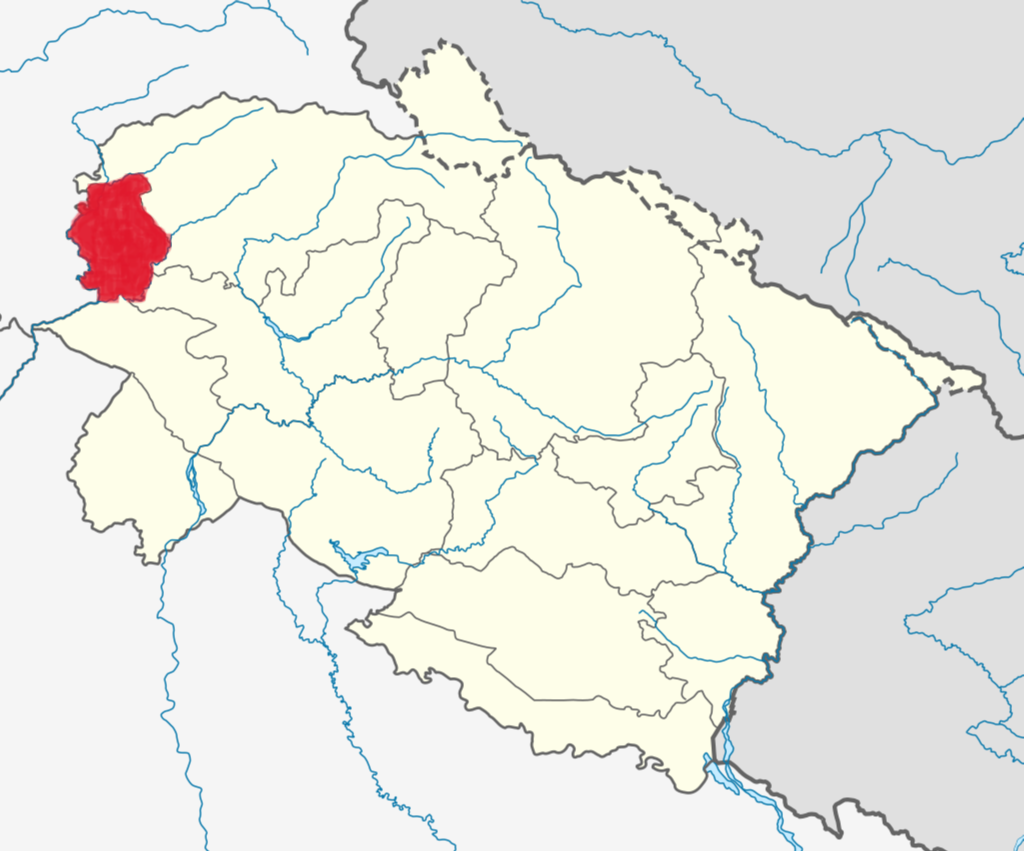
- Jaunsar-Bawar on map of Uttarakhand.
- Interactive map of Jaunsar-Bawar
- Country: India
- State: Uttarakhand
- District: Dehradun
- Elevation: 2,118 m (6,949 ft)

Population (2011)
  - Total: 1 25 486

Languages
  - Official: Hindi
  - Native: Jaunsari
- Time zone: UTC+5:30 (IST)

Jaunsar-Bawar is a hilly region in Garhwal division of Uttarakhand, northern India. It is part of the Mahasu region. It is located in the north-west of Dehradun district, along the border with the state of Himachal Pradesh.

Ethnically, Jaunsar-Bawar comprises two regions, inhabited by the two predominant groups: Jaunsar, the lower half, while the snow-clad upper region is called Bawar, which includes, the 'Kharamba peak' (3,084 metres (10,118 ft)). Geographically adjacent, they are not very different from each other. The Bawar lies in the upper regions of the area. They are a unique community because they have remained cut off from the external world for centuries, leading to the retention of their unique culture and traditions, which have attracted historians, anthropologist and studies in ethnopharmacology to this region for over a century. There is a significant cultural shift from Garhwal region, as it is part of the cultural Mahasu region.

== Jaunsar-Bawar region ==
The Jaunsar-Bawar region, is a valley, spread over 1002 km^{2} and 398 villages (villages near Koti colony, Sahiya market Kalsi, Sakani, Kanbua and Kakadi), between 77.45' and 78.7'20" East to 30.31' and 31.3'3" North. It is defined in the east, by the river Yamuna and by river Tons in the west, the northern part comprises Uttarkashi district, and some parts of Himachal Pradesh, the Dehradun tehsil forms its southern periphery.

Modes of livelihood in this region are agriculture and animal husbandry, which in the upper region is mostly for self-sustenance, as merely 10 percent of cultivated area is irrigated. Milk, wool and meat are an integral part of the local economy.

== History ==
Jaunsar-Bawar was a part of Sirmaur State at one point of time, which is now Sirmaur district in Himachal Pradesh.

In 1829, Jaunsar-Bawar was incorporated in Chakrata tehsil, prior to which it had been a part of Sirmaur State, until the British conquered it along with Dehradun after the 1814 war with the Gorkhas.

Before the establishment of British Indian Army cantonment in 1866, the entire area was known as Jaunsar-Bawar, and the name continued to be in popular use for the region, until the early 20th century. While Hindi is the official language of the area but the native language of the area is Jaunsari, a language of the Western Pahari group of Indo-Aryan languages, is spoken by most of the people of the region.

== Geography ==
Traditionally, Jaunsar-Bawar region is known for its rich reserves of forested areas, in the high hills region, with trees of Deodar, Pine, and Spruce, made for it becoming an important destination for the timber even during the British period, when the logs were rolled down the slopes and floated on Yamuna river to Delhi. Gate system, time table based traffic diversion on one way hilly roads, which was there since the time of British, is now removed.

== Culture ==
There is a rigid caste system. The Upper caste, consisting of Brahmin, Rajput and khosh (who were mainly land owners ), both are differenent ], they are the [landowners. The Lower caste includes Badoi (Traditionally Architects/Builders), Lohar-Sunar, Dhaki, Dūm. In the post-independent period the state government declared the inhabitants of this region to be 'Scheduled Tribes' (STs). The status of Scheduled Tribe was given to the Jaunsaris because of the efforts of the local political leaders. The upper castes in the region initiated a movement for the special status of ST. Memebers of the legislative assembly (MLAs) contributed to the movement and argued that the upper castes were exploited by lower caste money lenders before a state committee in 1967. Apart from that the prevalance of marriage customs like polyandry also contributed to this claim of tribal status. However, only the upper caste Jaunsaris are provided with the status of STs. The lower castes who call themselves 'Harijans' have Scheduled Caste (SC) status. With the scheduled tribe status, the upper castes are also entitled to reservations and various affirmitive action policies in the state. Although, Jaunsaris refer to all the residents of this region, this shared identity often hides the internal caste differences.

As Jaunsar Bawar is part of Mahasu region, the culture of the local Jaunsari people is distinct from neighboring Garhwal and though there are some similarities as well. Its culture is closer to Sirmaur and Shimla district of Himachal Pradesh, as Jaunsar-Bawar paragana has been part of Sirmaur Hill Kingdom of Himachal Pradesh for a long time.

Jaunsari language's accent and grammar is some sort of similar to people of those of Shimla district's Mahasu Pahari and Sirmaur district's Sirmauri, lying in western side of Giri river, comprises Rajgarh, Paonta, Renuka, Nahan, Pacchad and Shillai tehsils of Sirmaur. These people are also known as Hatti, and has similar culture like Jaunsari people, as Jaunsaris are also known as Jaunsari Hattis. People's Union for Civil Liberties, PUCL Bulletin, September 1982. Some, anthropology studies in the 1990s revealed that tribal marriage practises were fast phasing out, and is being replaced by monogamy and these practices do not exist now

An important aspect of their culture are dances like the folk dance named Nati, Harul, Ghundiya Raso, Jhenta Raso, Jangbazi, Thoude, etc.

One unique custom which is followed here is the concept of bride price. The custom owes its origin to some strong logic. The parents spend a substantial amount on raising, educating and making the life of the girl as good as they can make it. In return the girl is an asset to the family as she cooks, cleans, and works on the farms. When a boy wants to marry the girl, he is taking away an asset of the family and must pay the fair price of the asset known as the bride price. But over the year this practice is followed by a few masses.

Divorce is not a taboo in this culture, and divorced women are not ostracised from society. However, if the woman comes back to the parents' home after a divorce, the family must pay back the bride price to the man's family. If the woman divorces her husband to marry another man, the second man must pay bride price to the first man's family.. But over the years this practice is followed by a few masses.

== Architecture ==
As whole of the Mahasu region, Jaunsar Bawar also follows the Kath Kuni style of architecture. Houses are usually built in stone and timber and roofed with slate tiles. It is usually a two or three storey structure with a linear arrangement of one to four rooms on each floor and is typically sited on a terraced piece of land along the contours of the hill. In many villages in Uttarakhand, due to low temperature range, the housing and other buildings of socio-cultural values are generally shaped like pagodas or have sloping roofs.

The common building material used under construction includes wood (generally deodar, due to its abundance and durability), plain stones and other locally available materials like mud and stone slates. One of the important aspects of architecture in the area is the wooden carvings and the slate laden gabled roofs.

Since the local deity is Lord Mahasu, most of the temples are dedicated to him. Famous temples include Mahasu Devta Temple at Hanol, Mahasu Temple at Bulhad(Bharam Khat) Temple at Thaina, Mahasu Temple at Lakhwar, Mahasu Temple at Lakhsiyar and newly constructed Mahasu Temples in Bisoi and Lohari.

== Medicine ==
The Jaunsari people of the region has been using over 100 plants for the treatment of various ailments, which have remained a subject for many Ethnobotanical and Ethnopharamcological studies.

== In Media ==
Raaste Band Hain Sab, a film based on the work of Dr. Jayoti Gupta, Dept. of Sociology, Delhi University, on Jaunsar-Bawar, and made by Manjira Dutta, won the National Film Award for Best Anthropological/Ethnographic Film in 1988.

"Dance With GODS", the First chapter of the documentary Jaunsar Bawar : An Alternate Life highlights the centuries-old deity rituals and sacred ceremonies. The latter part shows a tradition that is celebrated annually and has an interesting storyline of its existence. Bollywood playback singer Jubin Nautiyal hails from this region.

== See also ==
- Shimla district
- Sirmaur district
- Nati dance
- Lakhamandal
