= Mahasu Devta Temple =

Hindu Temple in Uttarakhand

- महासू देवता मंदिर
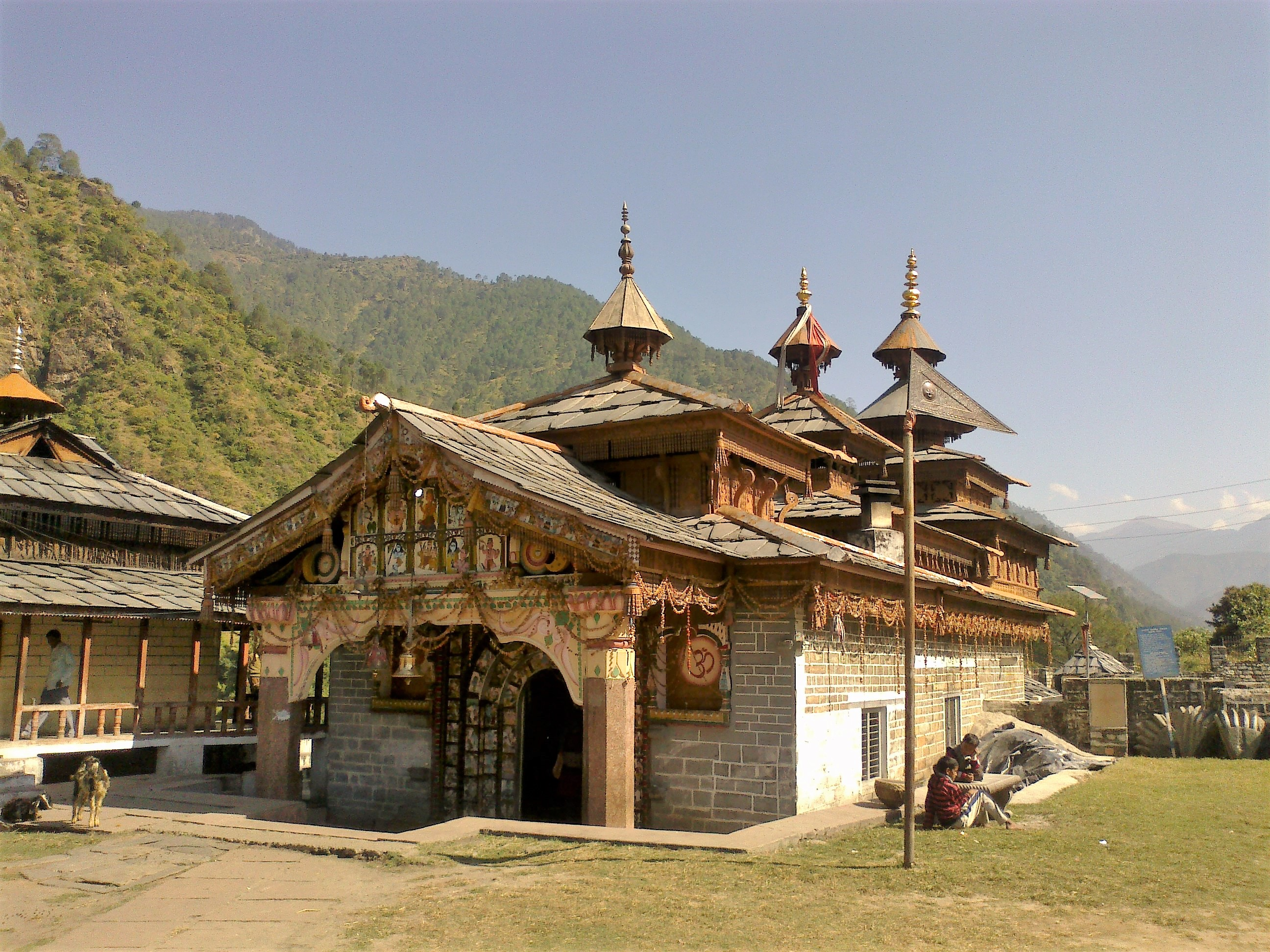

- Location in Uttarakhand

Religion
- Affiliation: Hinduism
- District: Dehradun district
- Deity: Mahasu Devta
- Festivals: Bishu, Jagra, Paush ki Dhaal, Budhi Diwali

Location
- Location: Hanol
- State: Uttarakhand
- Country: India
- Coordinates: 30.971004°N 77.927953°E

Architecture
- Type: Kath Kuni
- Elevation: 1,050 m (3,445 ft)

Website
- www.jaimahasudeva.in www.asidehraduncircle.in/dehradun.html

Mahasu Devta Temple (Mahasui: 𑚢𑚩𑚭𑚨𑚱 𑚛𑚲𑚦𑚙𑚭 𑚢𑚫𑚛𑚮𑚤, Hindi: महासू देवता मंदिर) is on the Tons River in the village of Hanol (near Chakrata), in Jaunsar, Dehradun district, Uttarakhand, India. The temple is dedicated to Shiva (locally known as Mahasu Devta), considered one of the most sacred deities in the Mahasu region.

The original temple (of which only the garbhagriha, or sanctum, survives) has a curved shikhara in the Nagara style. The original mulaprasada (main shrine) dates to the 9th–10th century CE. The mandapa and mukhamandapa (entrance area) were added later and have undergone changes. The stone-and-wood temple, built in the Kath Kuni style, is included in the Archaeological Survey of India's list of ancient temples under the Dehradun Circle, Uttarakhand. It is about 156 km from Mussoorie, and about 140 km from Shimla.

== Legend ==
Mahasu Devta
- Sanskrit transliteration: Mahāsū Devatā
- Affiliation: Deva
- Abode: Hanol
- Mantra: ॐ श्रीमहासूदेवाय नमः। Om Śrīmahāsūdevāya namaḥ

According to legend, Mahasu Devta were four brothers who came from Kashmir. When Krishna disappeared at the end of Dvapara Yuga, the Pandavas followed him across the Tons River. Yudhishtra (the eldest Pandava), captivated by the region's beauty, asked Vishwakarma to build a temple and stay with Draupadi for nine days. The place came to be known as Hanol, after Huna Bhatt.

At the beginning of Kali Yuga demons wandered Uttarakhand, devouring people and destroying villages. The greatest demon was Kirmira, who devoured all seven sons of a pious Brahmin named Huna Bhatt. Kirmira desired Kirtaka (Huna Bhatt's wife), who prayed to Shiva to protect her. Shiva blinded Kirmir, and Kirtaka returned to her husband. They went to the Kashmir mountains to seek Mahasu, who killed the demons on the river.

== May 2004 festival ==
At a festival held from 22 May to 26 May 2004, required twenty-five goats to be sacrificed, and were sacrificed. According to Pandit Devi Ram of Maneoti, sacrificial practices were then halted. Women were also allowed entrance to the temple.

== Fair ==
A three-day fair is held each August, demonstrating the community's cultural harmony. The temple's deity idol is carried in a procession with prayers, music and dancing.

== Palanquins ==
The palanquins of Mahasu Devta generally have a roofed, box-type design; the deity's image (murti or muharas) is inside the box. Usually made of silver and sometimes inlaid with gold, the box and roof are typically decorated with repoussé images of Shiva, Ganesha, Krishna, the Pandavas and Kauravas, and gopis. A silver parasol at the peak of the roof and a ball at each corner of the box reproduces the geometry of a centre and four directions, visualising Mahasu's status as "king of the gods" (Hindi: (देवो का राजा)). A woven silver cummerbund around the box, through which the deity's sword is hung, suggests a demon-slaying ruler.

== Temple architecture ==
The temple's sanctum is a stone shikhara in classical Nagar style. The wooden structure is covered with a steeply-pitched, slate pent roof topped with a two-tiered, conical canopy and a tapered kalasha. The balcony has corner bells which sway in a breeze.

The sanctum has a bronze image of several figures. Entry is restricted to a pujari, who undergoes ritual ablution with each entrance. In front of the sanctum is a bhandar, a large room where sacramental objects are stored. Entrance to the bhandar is restricted to Brahmins only. Its door has a lion-head ring handle. In front of the vestibule is a mandapa and an open front portico. Each of the temple's four rooms has a separate roof. The vestibule and bhandar have a three-tiered pent roof with a pyramidal canopy. The front porch has a gable roof supported by two wooden pillars with an ornamental arch.

== Gallery ==
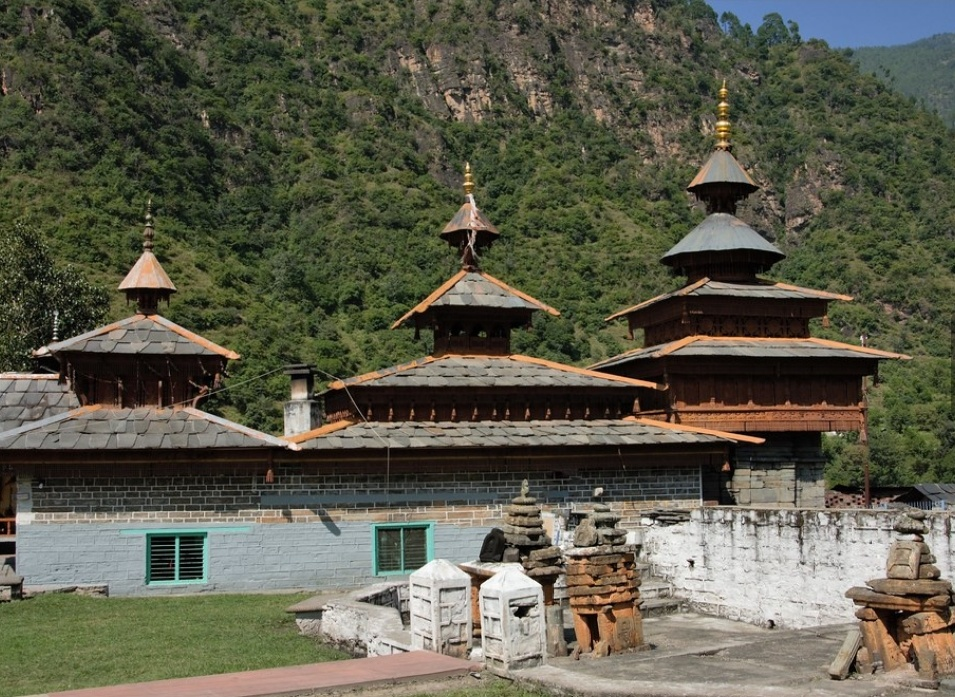
Temple exterior

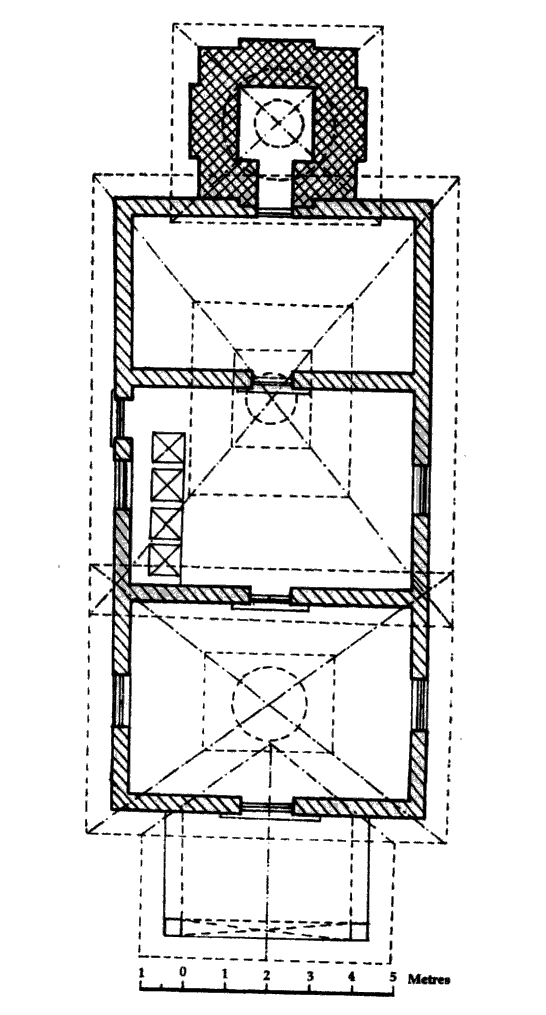
Temple plan

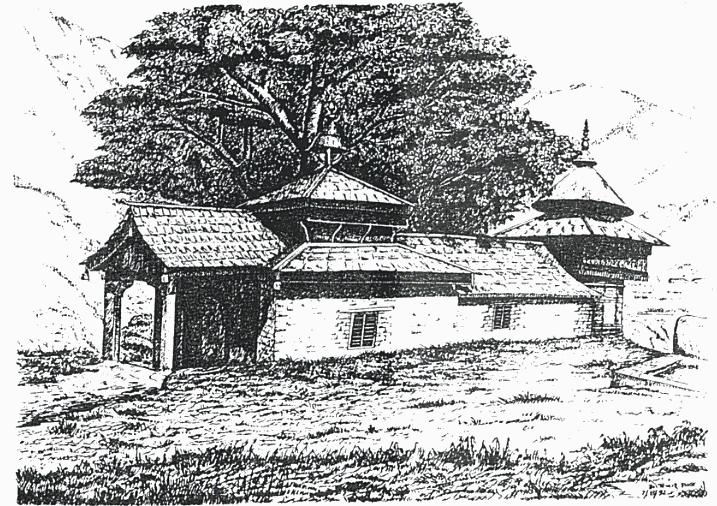
A drawing

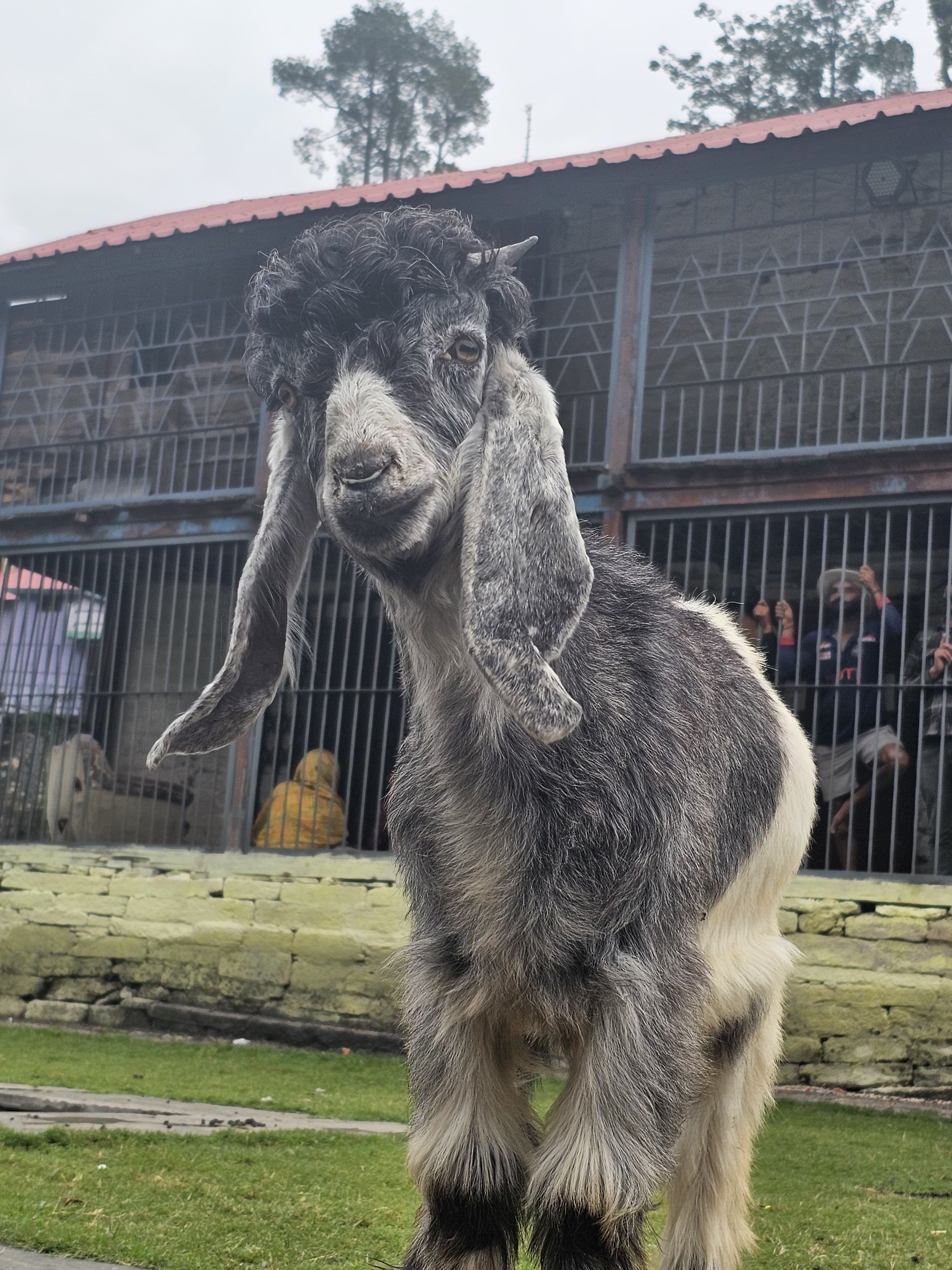
A goat, offered by devotees, roams the temple grounds.

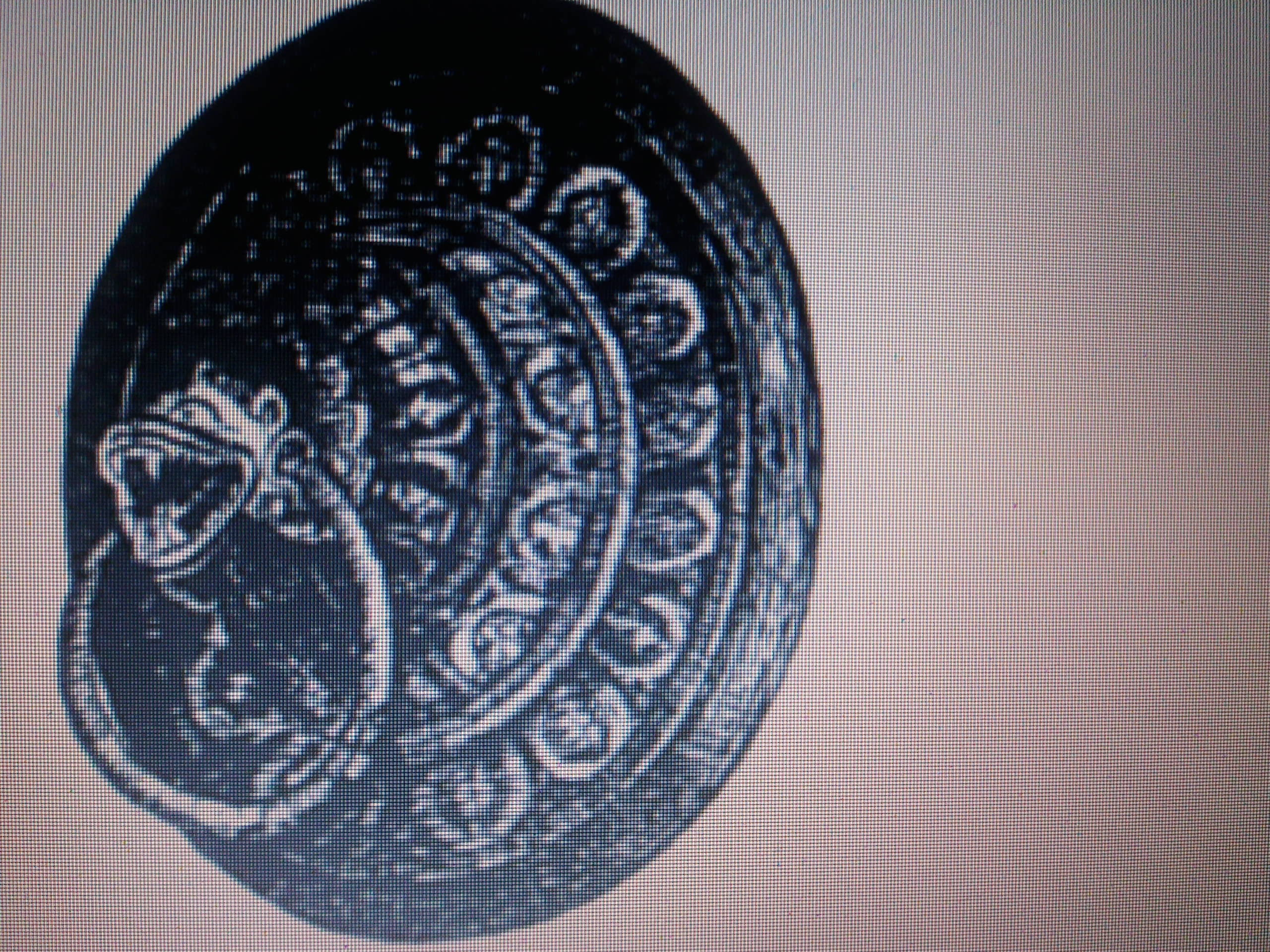
Lion-head door handle
