= Nati (dance) =

Indian folk dance

Nati (नाटी) is a traditional folk dance in the Western and Central Hills of the Indian subcontinent. It is primarily native to the states of Himachal Pradesh. Nati is traditionally performed in the Kullu, Mandi, Shimla, Sirmaur, Chamba, Kinnaur. Due to high immigration of ethnic paharis in the plainlands, this has been made popular in the plainlands too. Traditionally, locals dance to the beats of percussion instruments called Dhol-Damau. Nati dance is listed in the Guinness Book of World Records as the largest folk dance.

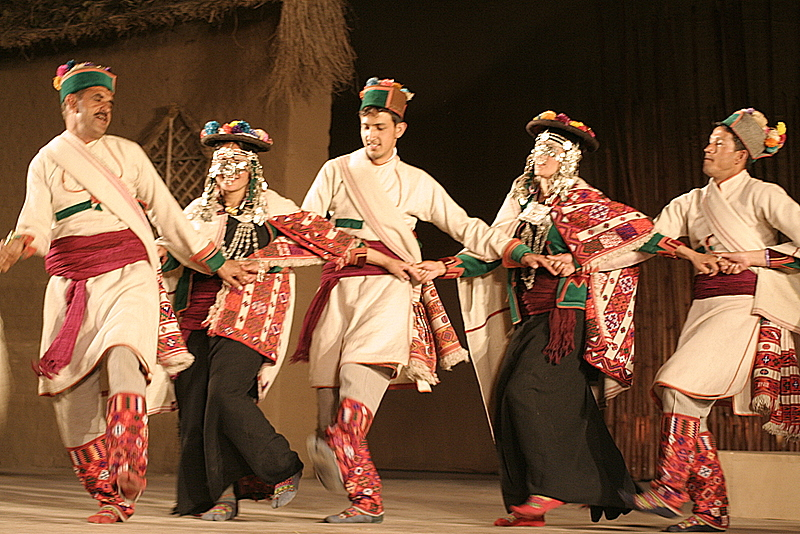
Nati dance of Kinnaur

== Varieties ==
There are several varieties of Nati performed like Kullvi Nati, Mahasuvi Nati, Sirmauri Nati, Kinnauri Nati, Jaunpuri Nati, Barada Nati, Bangani Nati. It is also sometimes called Tandi, specially in Jaunsar-Bawar. People of Lahaul district have their own distinct dance called "Garphi" and Nati is not a part of Lahauli culture. The Kinnauri Nati dance is mime-like and includes languid sequences.

== Performance ==
The various Nati dance variations are inspired from the stories of Raaslila and Chandravali. The dance is associated with Hindu deities, and is performed on almost all joyous occasions such as birth, weddings, crop harvest, and religious festivals such as Dussehra and Diwali.

Nati used to be performed by males in the past; however, women are mostly involved in taking the traditional dance form ahead. There are no restrictions on the number of people who can perform Nati. It is performed in circles or semi-circles, and the line moves forward and backward depending upon the steps. The group is usually led by male dancers carrying a fly whisk (locally chowrie) or Axe (locally Dangru). The dancers hold hands of alternate person which makes a ‘criss-cross’ visual of hands and arrange themselves in one of the two patterns, either men and women standing alternatively or a whole line of men and then women or vice versa, and move in a circle or semi-circle with simple dance steps consisting mainly of coordinated footsteps. These footsteps variates as per the location where Nati is being performed, but has one basic set of 8 steps that is followed everywhere with basic (slow) tempo of Nati. Talking about the variation, as differing footsteps, arrangement of hands can also differ. Nati is also performed without knitting hands, where hands are swayed free in air with coordinated footsteps, palm folding in a manner which makes a horizontal ‘8’. The dance tempo varies with the music; it usually starts slowly and picks up pace as the tempo of musical beats increase. The songs are woven with stories of old folklore.

If Nati is performed in a sacred occasion, a yagna is performed in the end to pay homage to the deities.

== Costumes ==
Costumes for Nati differ as per districts of Himachal Pradesh.

Male performers of Nati usually wear Himachali topi (caps), suthan (tight woollen pants), kurta, Nehru Jacket with muffler or Gachi (long muffler like cloth draped around the waist). The topis are often adorned with flowers and/or seeds of Indian Trumpet in Kinnaur. Though different regions have variations to this general costume, for example in Kullu, men have special headwear made up of flower garlands, and in Sirmaur, men wear special choltu (swirling tunics).

Women performers of Nati usually wear vibrant suit-salwar, Sadri (traditional women’s jacket), Dhattu (traditional head scarf), jewellery with Gachi. Though again this costume differ as per region of Himachal, for example, in Kullu, women are seen wearing a shirt which is adorned with a one-piece drape known as Pattu, along with traditional jewelleries like Chandrahaar, bumni, jhanjhar etc. Kinnauri dress of women is entirely different, worn with traditional heavy jewellery and multiple draping clothes. In Shimla District, Rezta/Rejta which is a two-piece apparel with a skirt and a blouse (or it can be made into a one-piece garment) is worn by women along with Sadri and Dhattu. Now Reztas are famous amongst women performers all over Himachal and outside Himachal.

Both men & women performers dance with a handkerchief tied to their right hand index finger (varies), and wear handmade traditional footwear known as pullas.

== Musical instruments ==
Some of the musical instruments used in Nati dances are dhol (drums), karnal (a longish horn), narsingha or narsinghe (a horn), shehnai, and nagara (drums). In the local language, the musicians are known as tunis.

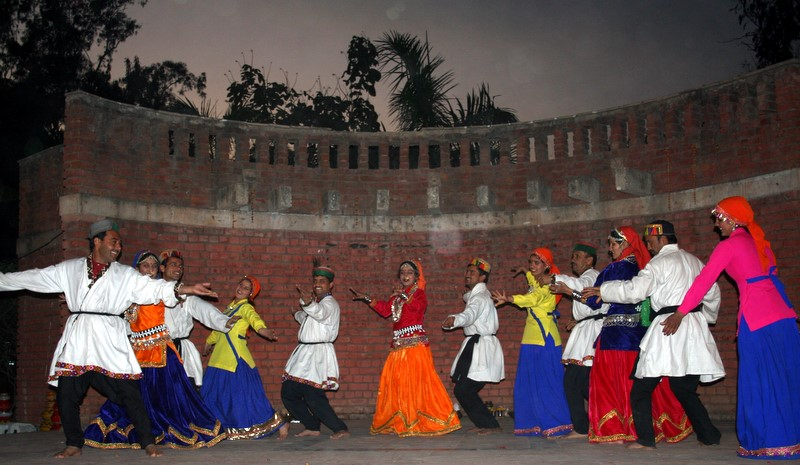
Sirmauri Nati

== Records ==
Sirmouri Natti has been entered in India Books of Record, Asia Book of Records and in the world book of records. Under the leadership and directions of Dr. Joginder Singh Habbi from Sirmour District cultural Group has made a World record by winning folk dance competition 10 times consecutively.

The Nati Dance in the second week of January 2016 was listed in the Guinness Book of World Records as the largest folk dance in the world. Nati entered in the book as the largest folk dance in terms of participants’ number. Total 9892 women participated in this folk dance in their traditional colourful Kullvi dress on 26 October 2015 during International Dussehra festival.
