= Jaunsari language =

Western Pahari language spoken in India

Jaunsari
- जौनसारी
- Jaunsari Script
- Native to: Uttarakhand
- Region: Jaunsar Bawar
- Ethnicity: Jaunsari
- Native speakers: 136,779 (2011)
- Language family: Indo-European: Indo-Iranian; Indo-Aryan; Northern; Western Pahari; Jaunsari
- Writing system: Dhankri Script (Historical); Devanagari

Language codes
- ISO 639-3: jns
- Glottolog: jaun1243
- ELP: Jaunsari
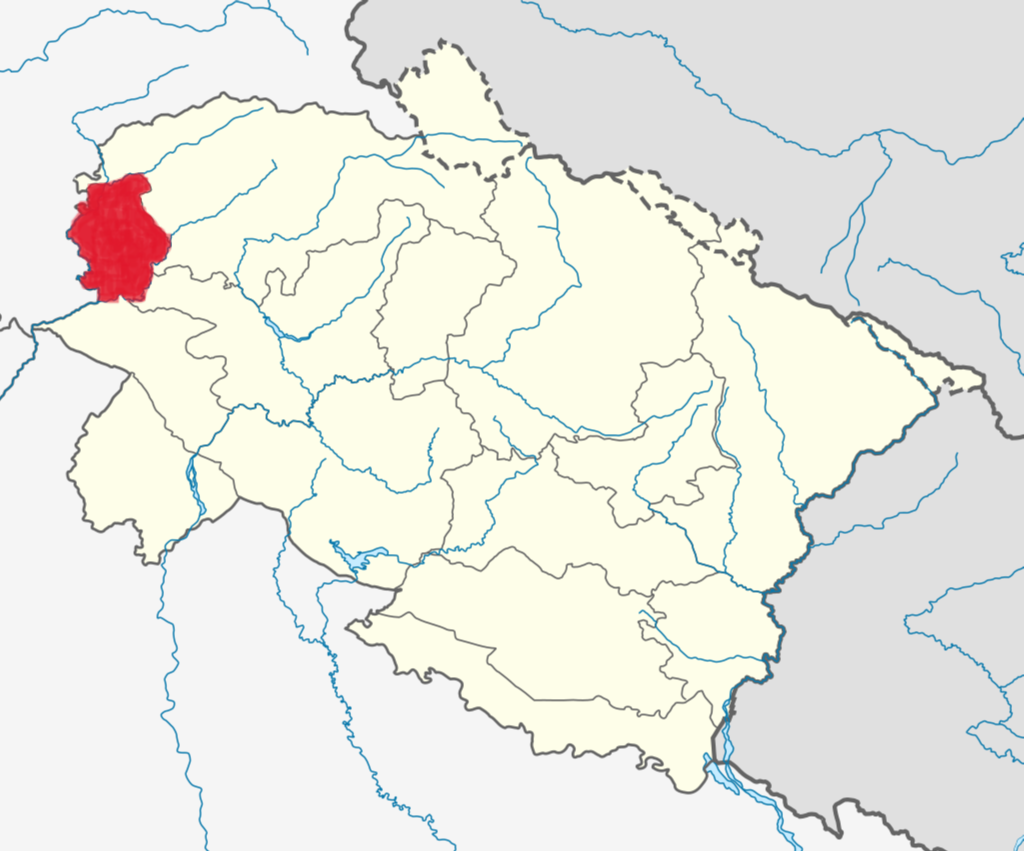
- The Jaunsari language spoken in red marked area of Uttarakhand

A native speaker from Uttarakhand speaking in Jaunsari

Jaunsari (Devanagari: जौनसारी,) is a Western Pahari language of northern India spoken by the Jaunsari people in the Kalsi, Chakrata and Tyuni sub-districts of Dehradun district in the Garhwal region of Uttarakhand state. It is closely related to Sirmauri and Mahasu Pahari.

The dialects of Jaunsari share about 60% of their basic vocabulary with each of the neighbouring varieties of Bangani, Jaunpuri, Nagpuriya and Sirmauri.

== Phonology ==
=== Consonants ===
		Labial	Dental	Alveolar	Retroflex	Post-alv./ Palatal	Velar	Glottal
Plosive / Affricate	voiceless	p	t		ʈ	tʃ	k	
Plosive / Affricate	aspriated	pʰ	tʰ		ʈʰ	tʃʰ	kʰ	
Plosive / Affricate	voiced	b	d		ɖ	dʒ	ɡ	
Plosive / Affricate	breathy	bʱ	dʱ		ɖʱ	dʒʱ	ɡʱ	
Fricative				s		ʃ		ɦ
Nasal		m		n	ɳ			
Lateral				l	ɭ			
Trill / Tap	voiced			r	ɽ			
Trill / Tap	breathy			rʱ	ɽʱ			
Approximant						j	w	

=== Vowels ===
	Front	Central	Back
Close	i iː		u uː
Mid	(e) eː	ə əː	(o) oː
Open-mid	ɛː		ɔː
Open		aː	

== Script ==
A native speaker speaking Jaunsari

Jaunsari was historically written in Jaunsari Script also known as Dhankri Script. The Devanagari script is being used these days in certain works.

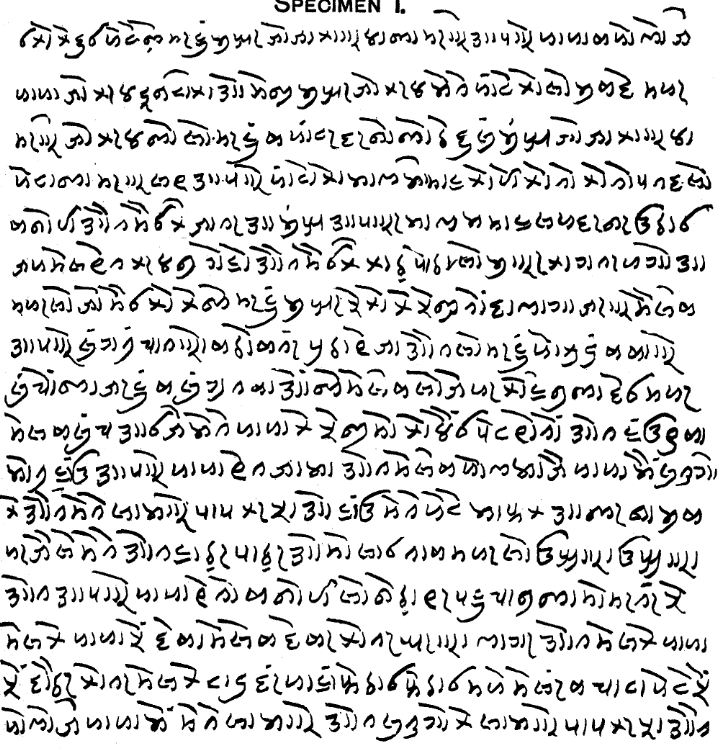
Specimen in Jaunsari script

== Status ==
The language has no official status. According to the United Nations Education, Scientific and Cultural Organisation (UNESCO), the language is of definitely endangered category, i.e. many Jaunsari children are not learning Jaunsari as their mother tongue any longer. The Ethnologue reports otherwise.

In 2016, State Council of Educational Research and Training (SCERT) announced that Garhwali, Kumaoni, Jaunsari and Rang languages would be introduced on pilot basis for students in standard one to 10th in government schools Under the ‘Know Your Uttarakhand’ project.
