= Harrawala railway station =

Railway station in Uttarakhand, India

Harrawala

General information
- Location: Balawala, Dehradun district, Uttarakhand; India
- Coordinates: 30.260892°N 78.097705°E
- Elevation: 596 metres (1,955 ft)
- System: Indian Railways station
- Owner: Indian Railways
- Operator: Indian Railways
- Line: Laksar–Dehradun line
- Platforms: 2
- Tracks: broad gauge

Construction
- Structure type: Standard (on ground)

Other information
- Status: Functioning
- Station code: HRW
- Zone(s): NR
- Division(s): Moradabad

Services
Preceding station	Indian Railways	Following station
Doiwala towards ?	Northern Railway zone Pune–Miraj–Londa line	Dehradun towards ?
Location
- Interactive map

Harrawala railway station is a railway station located on the Laksar–Dehradun railway line operated by the Northern Railway zone under Moradabad railway division. It is situated at Balawala in Dehradun district in the Indian state of Uttarakhand.
