= Doiwala railway station =

Railway station in Uttarakhand, India

Doiwala

General information
- Location: Doiwala, Dehradun district, Uttarakhand; India
- Coordinates: 30.1759°N 78.1224°E
- Elevation: 484 metres (1,588 ft)
- System: Indian Railways station
- Owner: Indian Railways
- Operator: Indian Railways
- Line: Laksar–Dehradun line
- Platforms: 2
- Tracks: broad gauge

Construction
- Structure type: Standard (on ground)

Other information
- Status: Functioning
- Station code: DWO
- Zone(s): NR
- Division(s): Moradabad

Services
Preceding station	Indian Railways	Following station
Kansrao towards ?	Northern Railway zone Pune–Miraj–Londa line	Harrawala towards ?
Location
- Interactive map

Doiwala railway station is a railway station located on the Laksar–Dehradun railway line operated by the Northern Railway zone under Moradabad railway division. It is situated at Doiwala in Dehradun district in the Indian state of Uttarakhand.
