= Kansrao railway station =

Railway station in Uttarakhand, India

Kansrao

General information
- Location: Kansrao, Dehradun district, Uttarakhand; India
- Coordinates: 30.07857°N 78.141795°E
- Elevation: 417 metres (1,368 ft)
- System: Indian Railways station
- Owner: Indian Railways
- Operator: Indian Railways
- Line: Laksar–Dehradun line
- Platforms: 1
- Tracks: broad gauge

Construction
- Structure type: Standard (on ground)

Other information
- Status: Functioning
- Station code: QSR
- Zone(s): NR
- Division(s): Moradabad

Services
Preceding station	Indian Railways	Following station
Raiwala Junction towards ?	Northern Railway zone Pune–Miraj–Londa line	Doiwala towards ?
Location
- Interactive map

Kansrao railway station is a railway station located on the Laksar–Dehradun railway line operated by the Northern Railway zone under Moradabad railway division. It is situated at Kansrao in Dehradun district in the Indian state of Uttarakhand.
