= St. Paul's Church, Landour =

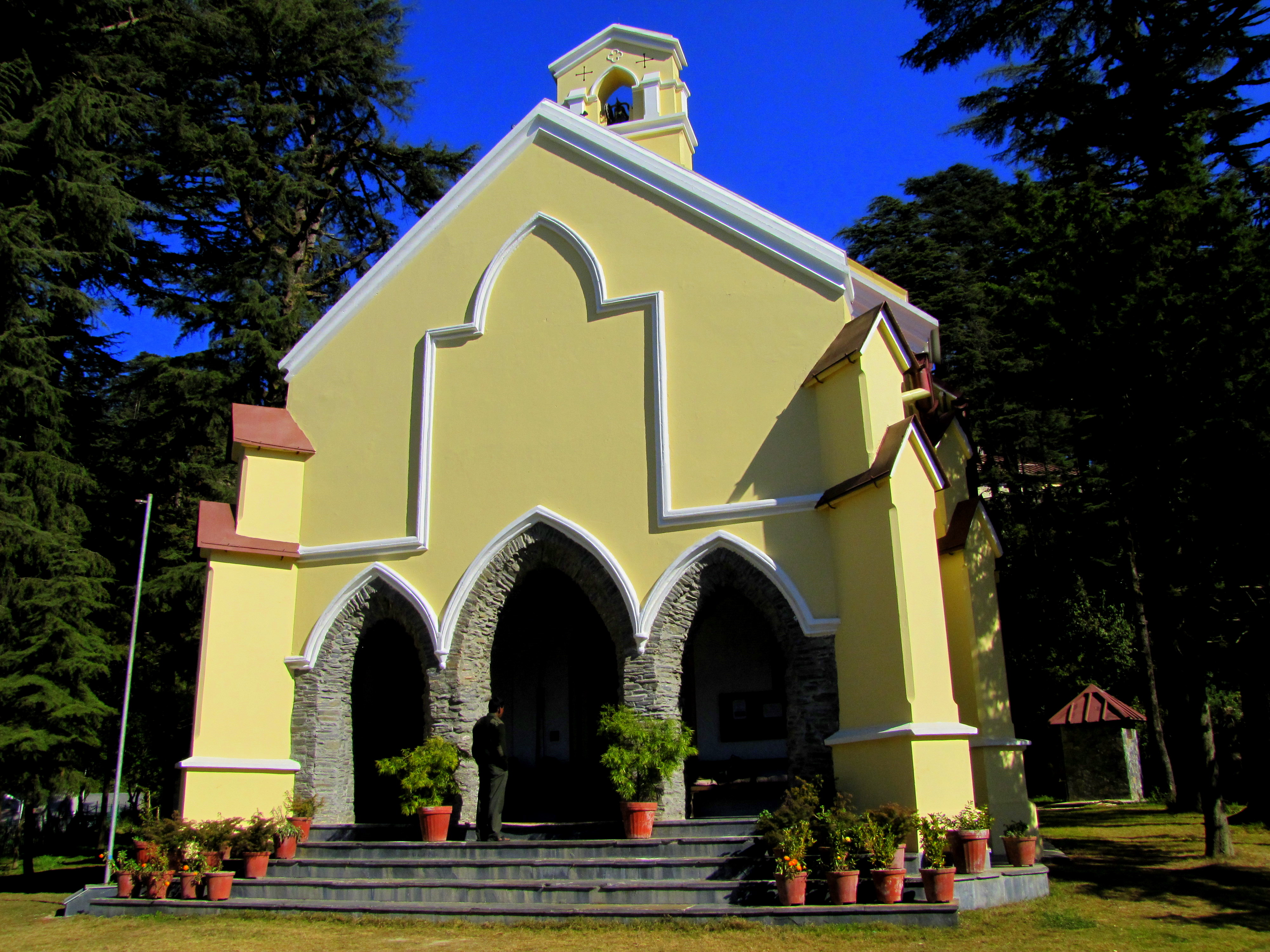
- St. Paul's Church, Landour
- Location: Landour, Uttarakhand
- Country: India
- Denomination: Anglican

History
- Founded: 1839
- Dedication: St. Paul
- Consecrated: 1 May 1840

St. Paul's is an Anglican church in Landour, India. The church was built in 1839 and first consecrated on 1 May 1840, by Bishop Daniel Wilson of Calcutta. From 1840 to 1947, the church was run by military chaplains for the cantonment used primarily by the British residents of Landour and the British Military Hospital during the British Raj.

== 19th century ==
St. Paul's was built in 1840 by Bishop Daniel Wilson who saw the need for the construction of a church in Landour, which would become the main station of the Anglican church in the Dehradun district. Upon its opening, St. Paul's was government owned and could seat 250 people. It was created for the particular use of the British troops based at the Landour convalescent depot.

The year 1857 marked the Indian Rebellion of 1857, an event the church record refers to, from the British perspective, as the "insurrection" of 1857. Rev. W.J.Jay was the chaplain during this period (1856—1857) and regular services were held uninterrupted.

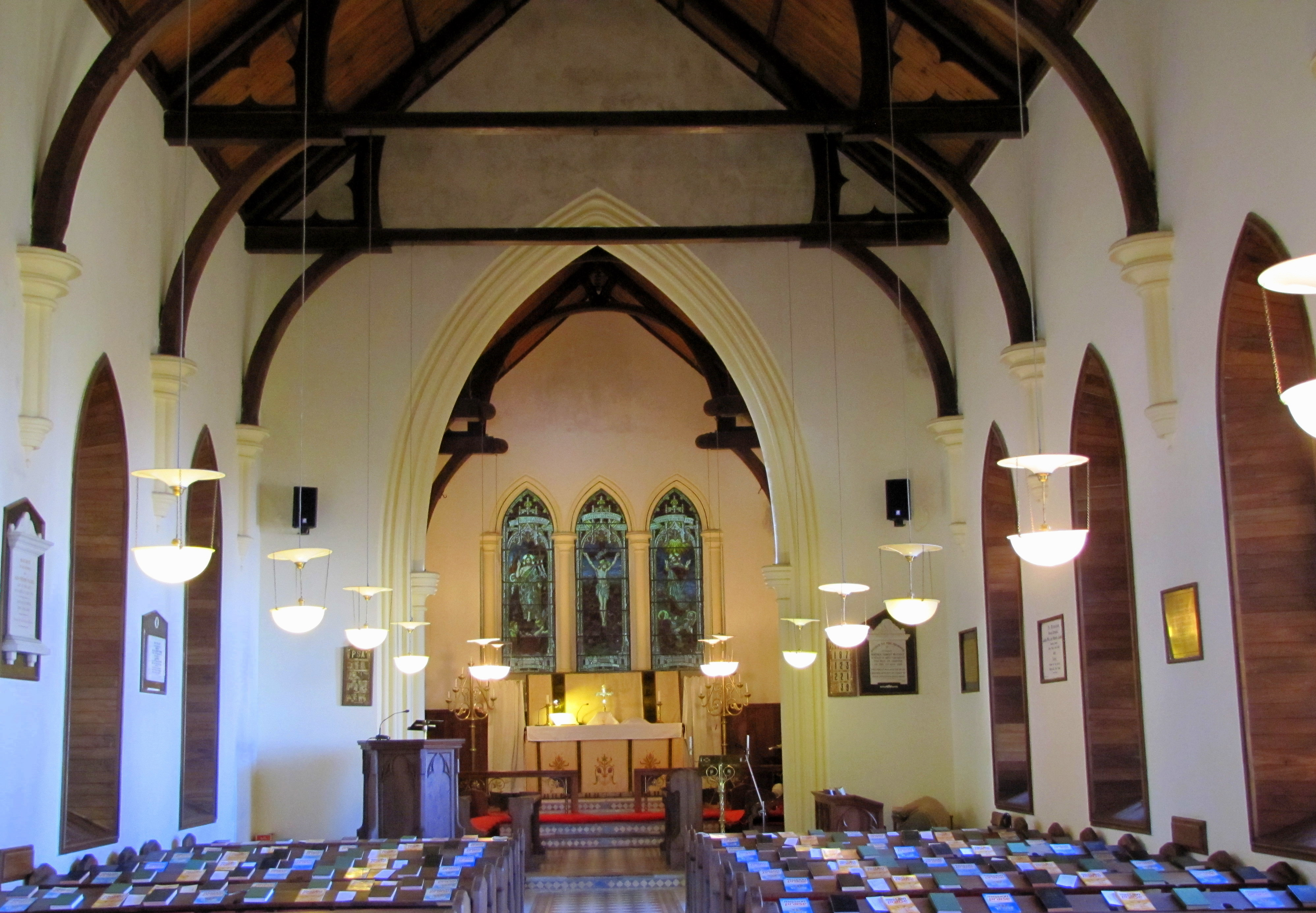
Interior of the newly restored church, 2010

== Present day ==
In 2005, the Pastorate Committee proposed the restoration of the church roof, due to leaking. Some money to fund the repairs was raised by the congregation but it was not enough to pay for the restoration work. At this point, Sanjay Narang alumni of Woodstock School - Class of '81 stepped forward to fund the complete restoration of the building. The works were completed in November 2008.
