= Timli State =

- Flag
- Capital: Timli
- Recognised regional languages: Gojri Hindi
- Government: Zamindari Estate
  - Rao: Phoda Singh Chokkar
  - Rao: Laal Karan Singh Chokkar
- Establishment: Around 1548
- Today part of: India

Timli State was founded in the mid 16th century by Rao Phoda Singh Chokkar and Rao Laal Karan Singh Chokkar members of the Chokkar clan of the Gurjara community. The state remained under the rule of the Chokkar Dynasty until its eventual annexation. Its former territory is now part of the Dehradun district in the Indian state of Uttrakhand.

== History ==
Ram Bhawan Palace served as the seat and residence of the Chokkar Dynasty of Timli.

Around 1548, two Gurjar Chieftains, Rao Phoda Singh and Rao Laal Karan Singh, originating from the Titron region of Sahranpur, crossed the Shivalik hills and established their rule over the Vikasnagar region of Dehradun and established a town named Timli. Honorary Magistrate Chaudhary Rao Bhagwan Singh Rahis, was the distinguished ruler of Timli Estate. He held the esteemed office of Magistrate and was entrusted with the responsibility of regulating and fixing the prices of the agricultural commodities across North India.

Chaudhary Rao Bhagwan Singh Rahis of Timli Riyaasat.

Rao Bhagwan Singh ji of Timli had only one daughter, Kunwarani Savetri Devi, who was married to Kunwar Dhau Harban Singh Khatana of the Khatana Dhau family of Dhau Jagir, Bharatpur. In 1940, following the conclusion of Rao Bhagwan Singh's reign, Kunwar Harban Singh Khatana ji succeeded him as the ruler of Timli State.

Land Revenue Receipt of Timli State.

== List of Rulers ==
The rulers of Timli held the titles of Rao and Chaudhary/Choudhari. The list of Rulers is as follows:

Dhau Bakshi Rao Harban Singh Khatana, the last official ruler of Timli State. He belonged to the Khatana Dhau Family of Bharatpur.

1. Rao Phoda Singh Chokkar
2. Rao Laal Karan Singh Chokkar
3. Dharma-Murti Shrimant Chaudhary Rao Fateh Singh ji Chokkar
4. Shrimant Chaudhary Rao Khushi Ram Chokkar
5. Chaudhari Rao Ram Singh Rahis
6. Honorary Magistrate Chaudhary Rao Bhagwan Singh ji Rahis
7. Dhau Bakshi Rao Harban Singh Khatana
8. Rani Savetri Devi
9. Chaudhary Rao Narayan Singh
10. Shrimant Chaudhary Dillip Singh (Current)

== Chhattaris of Timli State ==
The Chhattaris (cenotaphs), of Timli are two historic memorial structures associated with the erstwhile Gurjar rulers of Timli. Located near the town of Timli, these structures are notable examples of Mughal influenced architecture and reflects the historical legacy of the state's ruling family.

Chhattri of Dharam-Murti Shrimant Chaudhary Rao Fateh Singh ji Chokkar

The First Chhattari is an octagonal structure with a domed roof, while the 2nd is a taller octaganol structure, featuring an inner chamber, eight arched openings and an elaborate roof design.

Chhattari of Dharma-Murti Shrimant Chaudhary Rao Fateh Singh ji Chokkar

According to an inscription in Devanagari script, the Chhattaris were constructed by Shrimant Chaudhary Rao Khushi Ram in memory of his elder brother, Dharmamurti Chaudhary Rao Fateh Singh ji, the ruler of Timli State who died in 1886. The inscription was engraved in 1934, by his grandson, Rao Bhagwan Singh Rahis ji.

== See also ==
- Landhaura
- Gurjars
- Dehradun district
- Samthar State
- Manglaur
