= Landour =

Landour Landaur
- town
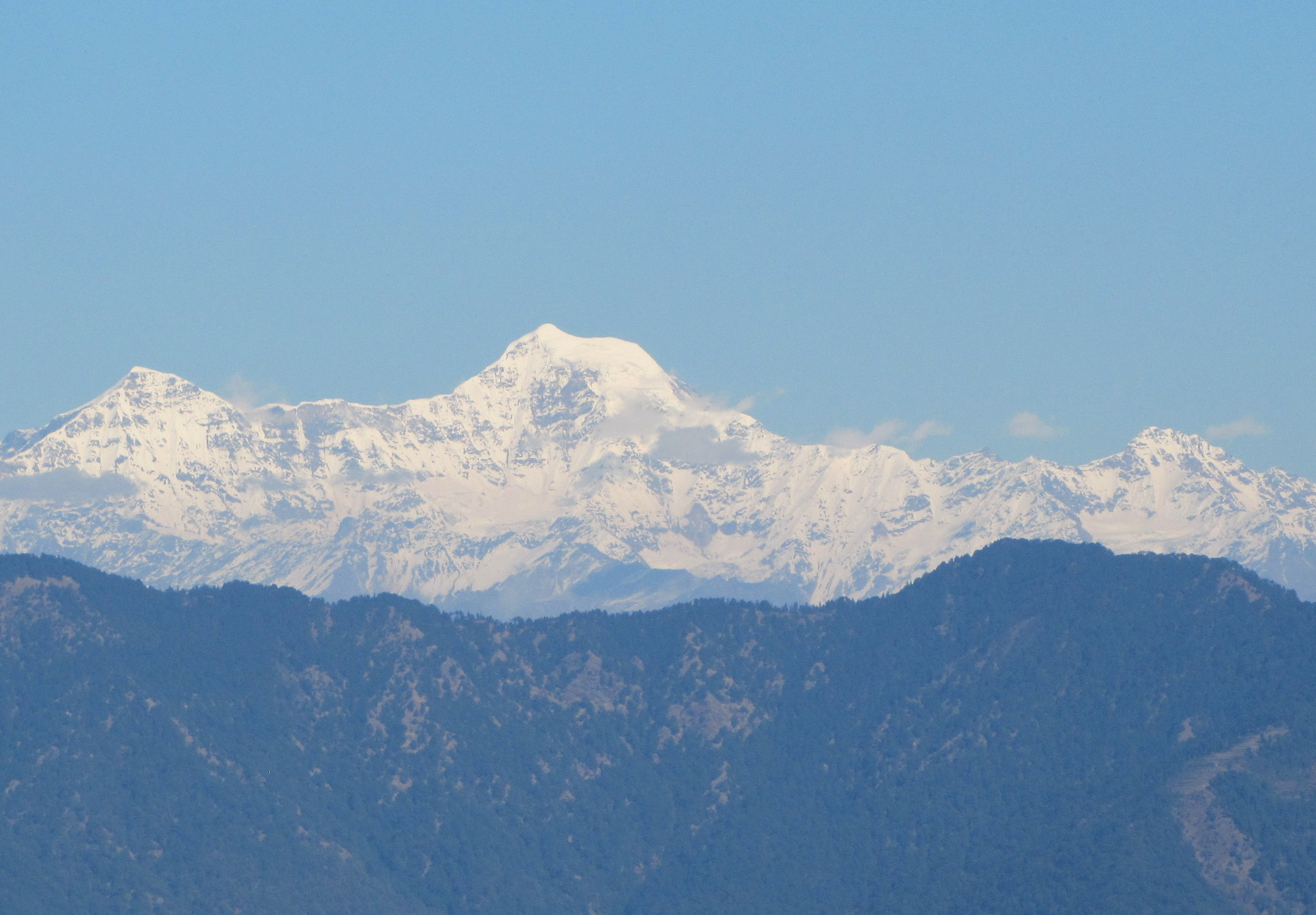
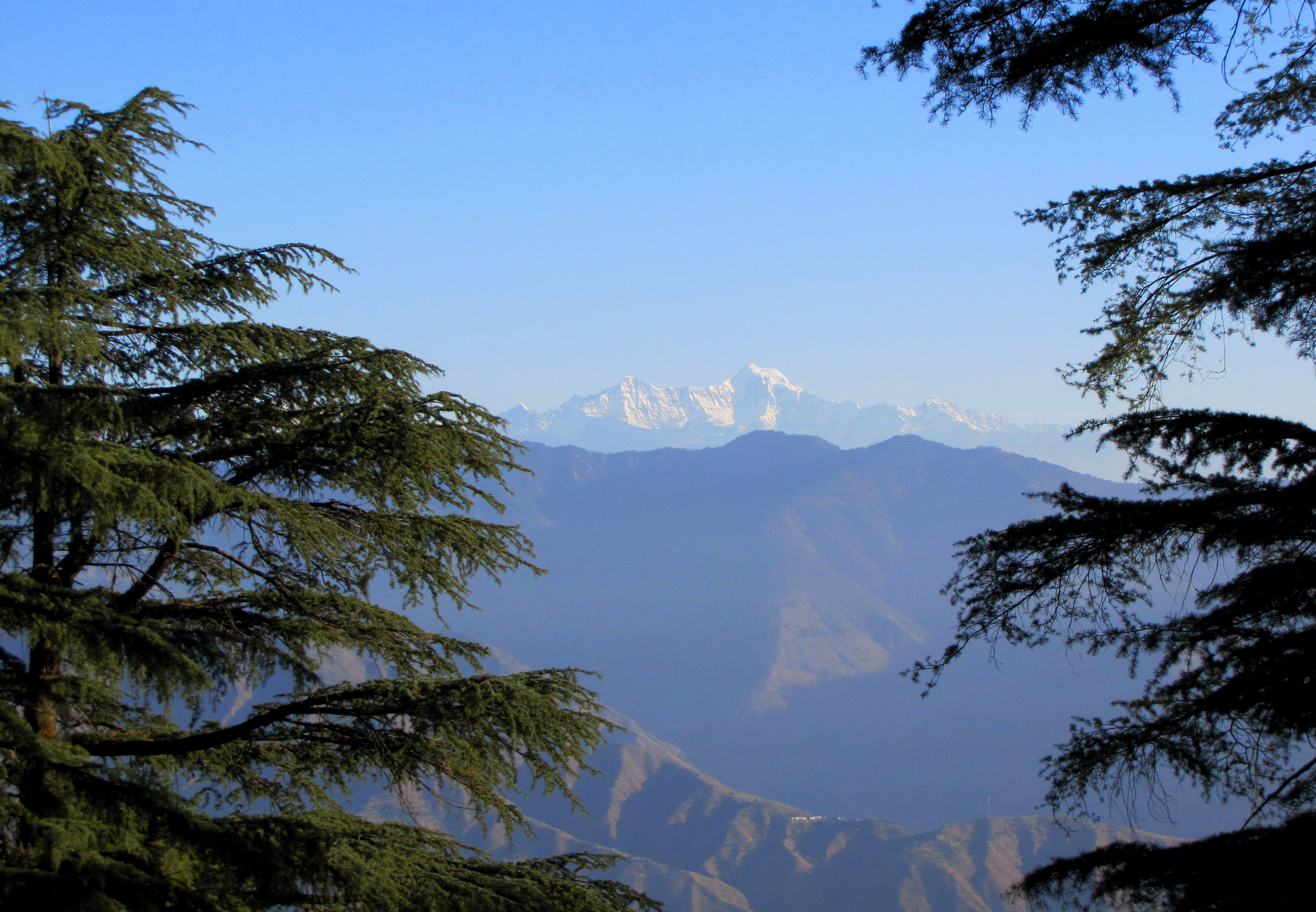
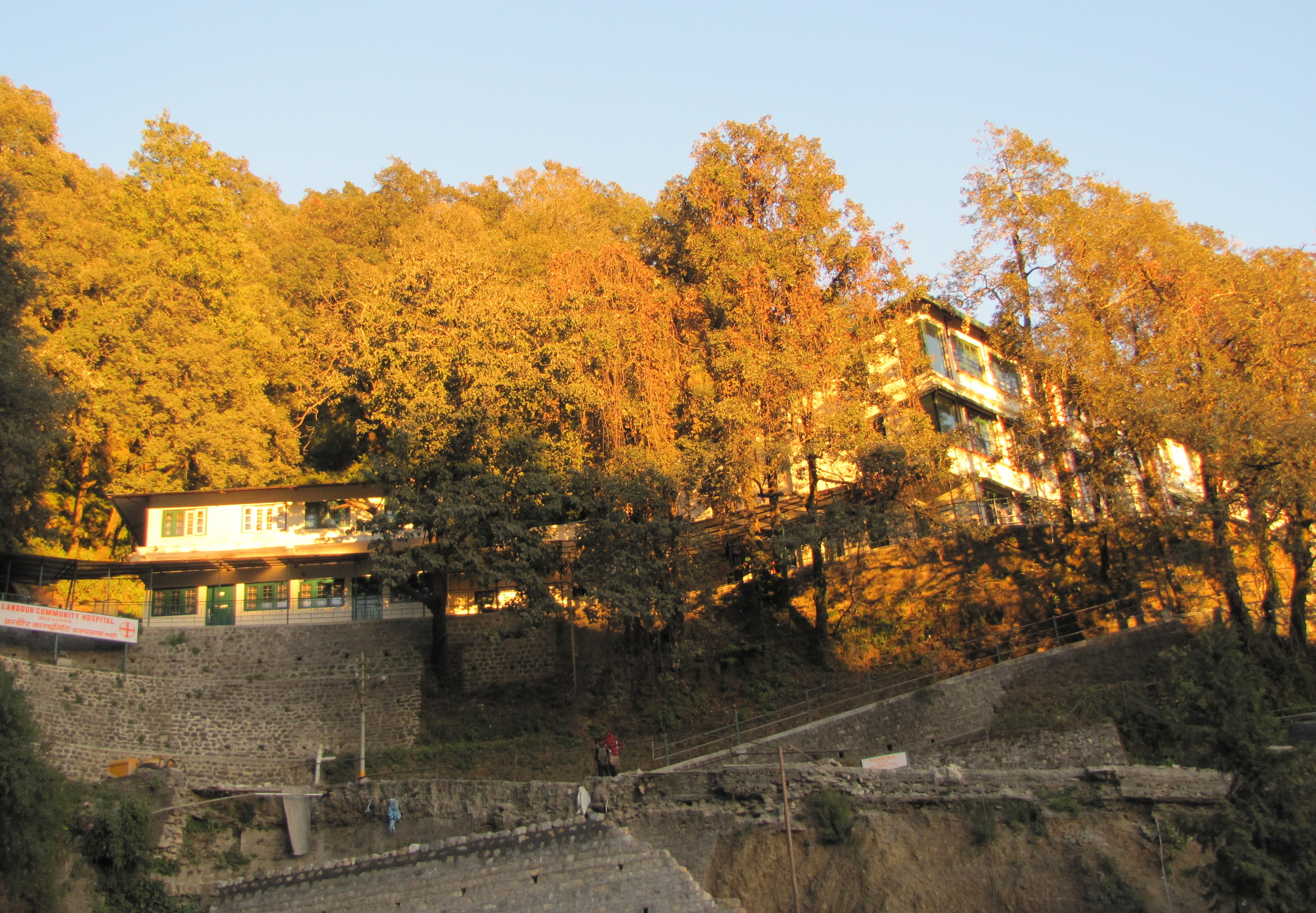
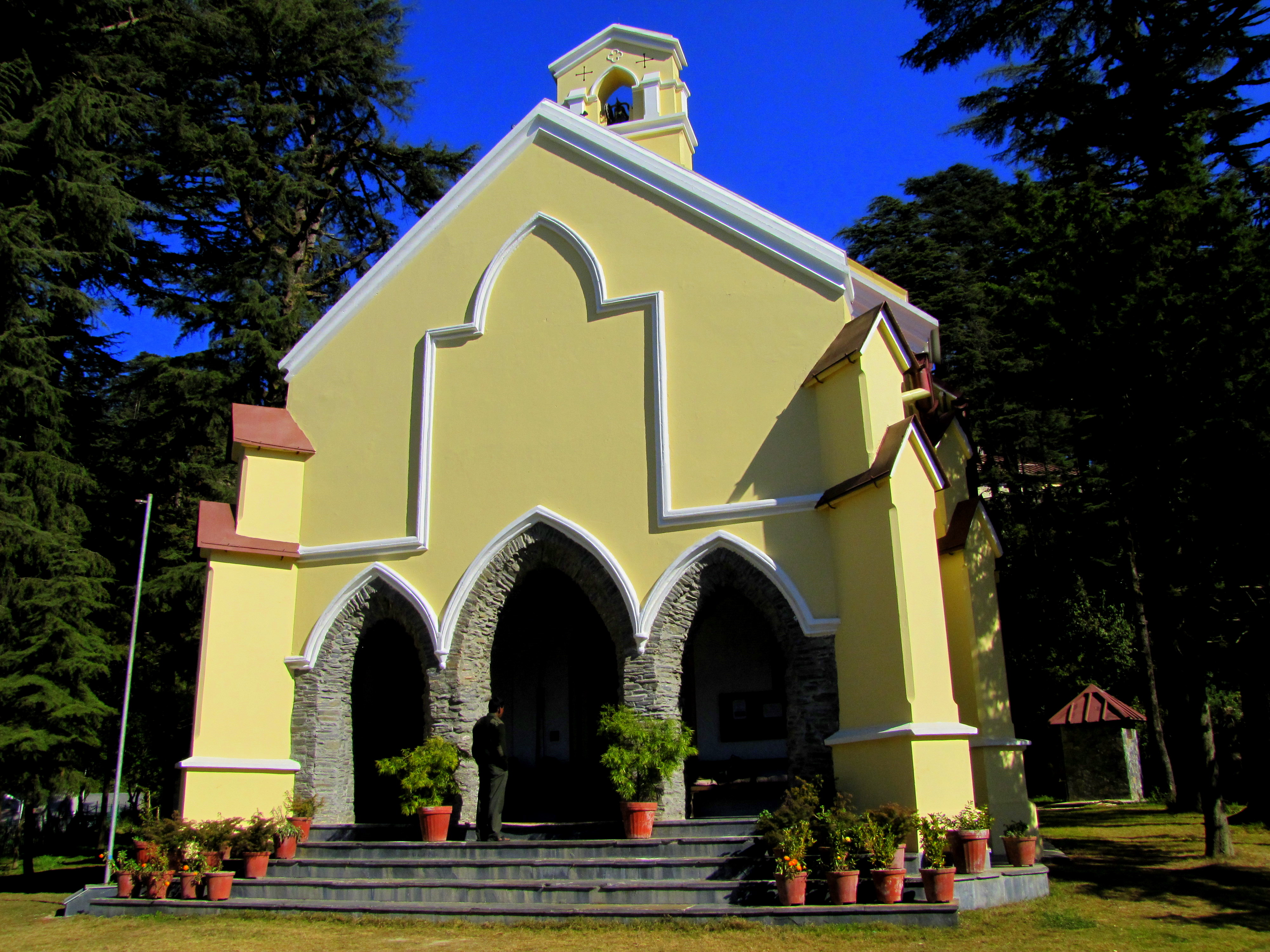
- From top, left to right: Bandarpunch from Landour; Landour Himalayan View; Landour Community Hospital; St. Paul's Church, Landour

- Location in Uttarakhand, India Landour (India)
- Coordinates: 30.47°N 78.10°E
- Country: India
- State: Uttarakhand
- District: Dehradun

Population (2001)
  - Total: 3,500

Languages
  - Official: Hindi
  - Regional: Jaunpuri; Jaunsari
- Time zone: UTC+5:30 (IST)
- PIN: 248179
- Vehicle registration: UK
- Website: uk.gov.in

Landour, a small cantonment town contiguous with Mussoorie, is about 35 km (22 mi) from the city of Dehradun in Dehradun district in the northern state of Uttarakhand in India. The twin towns of Mussoorie and Landour, together, are a well-known British Raj-era hill station in northern India. Mussoorie-Landour was widely known as the "Queen of the Hills". The name Landour is drawn from Llanddowror, a village in Carmarthenshire in southwest Wales. During the Raj, it was common to give nostalgic English, Scottish, Welsh or Irish names to one's home (or even to British-founded towns), reflecting one's ethnicity. Names drawn from literary works were also common, as from those by Robert Burns, Sir Walter Scott, Thomas Hardy, Robert Louis Stevenson and many others.

== History ==
=== Origin as British sanatorium ===
Landour is within Dehradun District of the former United Provinces. The United Provinces themselves were carved out of the former Northwest Province of the vast Bengal Presidency, which stretched from Burma to the Khyber Pass; accordingly, early accounts show Landour as part of "Bengal", which was technically true though the description was incomplete.

Landour was initially built by and for the British Indian Army. From 1827 when a sanatorium was built in Landour, the town was a convalescent station for the military, and hence much of Landour is a Cantonment. The original sanatorium is now occupied by the Institute of Technology Management ("ITM") of the DRDO; it is at the eastern end of the Landour ridge. In the early 20th century, a full British Military Hospital (BMH) was opened, with a medical staff that specialized in tropical diseases; the hospital closed soon after 1947. Also within the ITM premises is the former Soldiers' Furlough Home, a holiday home for British and Irish soldiers and JCOs in Indian regiments who lacked the means to return to Europe regularly. Or, the holidaying soldiers were serving in British regiments on rotation in India, their tours of duty lasting anywhere from 6 to 48 months. In terms of area, Landour Cantonment comprises about two-thirds of Landour; the remainder includes Landour Bazaar, which stretches along the spur that connects to Mussoorie.

The first permanent building in all of Mussoorie-Landour was also built in Landour in 1825. The house was built by Captain Frederick Young, the "discoverer" of Mussoorie, who was also the Commandant of the first Gurkha (or Gorkha) battalion raised by the British after prevailing in the Gurkha War. Young's house, Mullingar (hinting at his Irish blood), was the family home during the hot summers in the plains. Young's Dehradun-based battalion, then called the Sirmour (or Sirmoor) Rifles, was initially raised in a Gurkha POW camp in Paonta Sahib in Sirmour District – hence the name. The huge L-shaped building, with an outsized courtyard inside the bend of the "L", sits prominently atop Mullingar Hill in Landour Cantonment.

Among distinguished house guests at Mullingar in the early decades were Emily Eden (see below). Mullingar was expanded, changed hands several times and by the early 20th century had become the Mullingar Estate Hotel. During World War II, Mullingar was leased by the army to house the overflow of convalescing soldiers from the sanatorium, given the huge increase in war-related injuries. The hotel was bursting at the seams, as a number of British civilian evacuees from Burma, the Andamans, Manipur and Nagaland, which were occupied by Japanese forces, were also housed in Mullingar before being shipped out elsewhere. Mullingar finally fell into disuse after 1947 when Britons began to leave India, with the army already having vacated it after the postwar demobilization of 1945–46. The building soon fell into disrepair, occupied largely if not entirely by squatters (see below). A number of the families now living in Mullingar are Tibetan. Prayer flags flutter in the wind every day, and Losar celebrations are held in the courtyard every year.

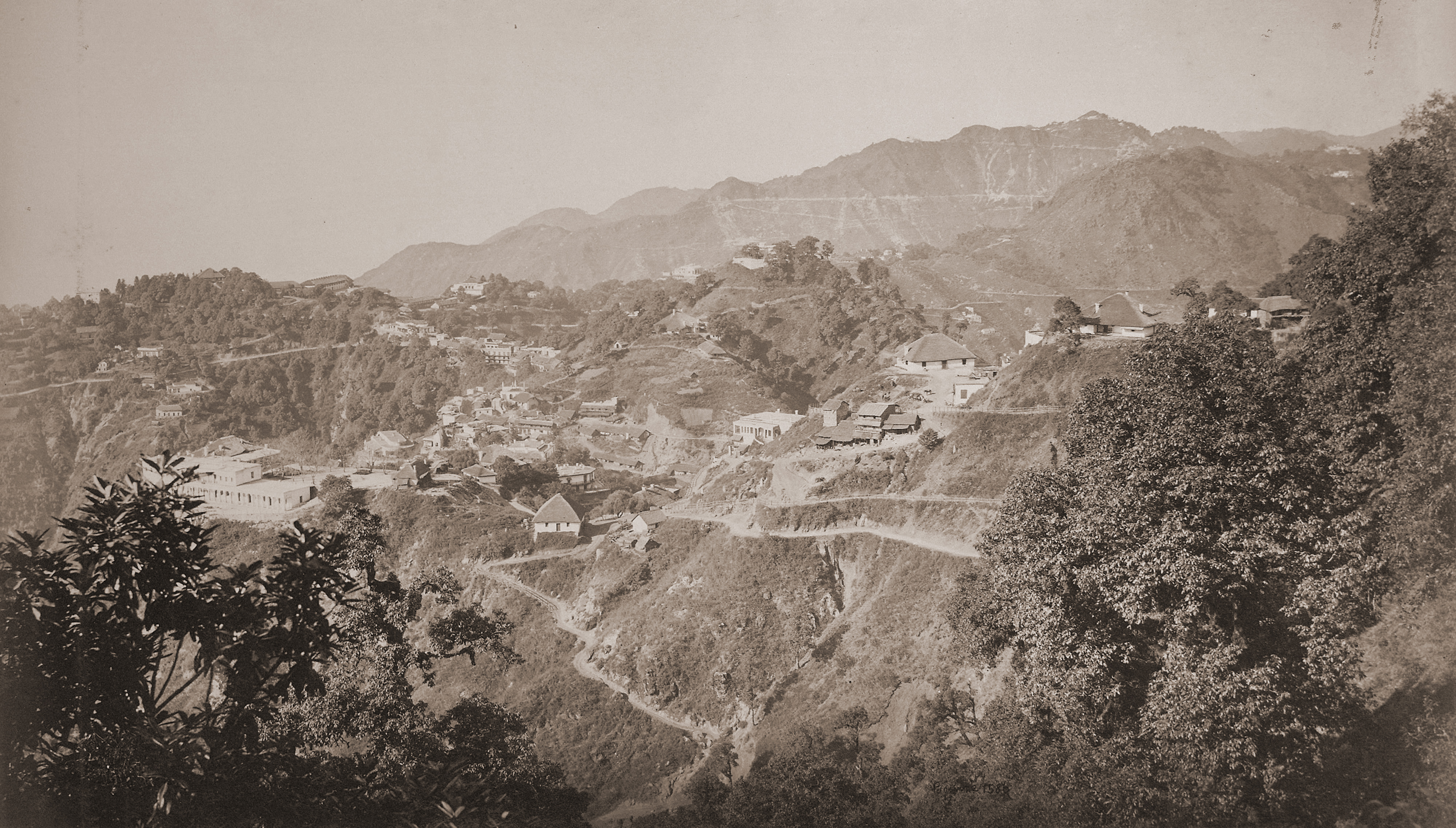
Mussoorie and Landour in 1860s.

The legal distinction between Mussoorie and Landour did not arise until the 1860s, when after the historic events of 1857 cantonments were properly surveyed and formalized. In particular, control of the ridge-lines and water sources was crucial, given rising British anxieties over their grip on India. The defensibility of garrisons was critical, especially in hill stations with large European populations. The Cantonments Act of 1924 further clarified the rights of the property owners; new construction of any kind, especially of private homes, was virtually banned. Conservation was also a key goal, given the excesses of the 19th century (see below); the Act clearly states that title to all trees remains with the army, hence there has been no logging in Landour since in over a century. By definition, all non-military and non-governmental buildings built after 1924 are illegal. Therefore, there are few modern homes in Landour, though renovations and reconstruction of pre-existing houses are permitted. Due to the 1924 Act, Landour Cantonment is—unlike Landour Bazaar—largely free of the commercialization that can be seen in much of Mussoorie proper, especially along the main drag of Mall Road, where tourists throng in the summer.

=== European legacy ===
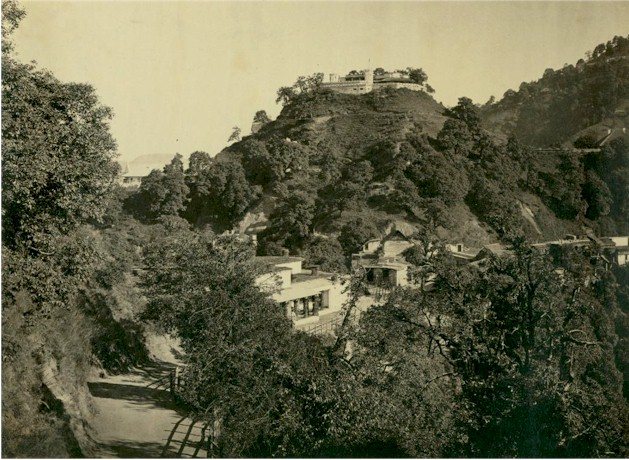
Castle Hill and The Castle, Landour by Samuel Bourne in 1865.

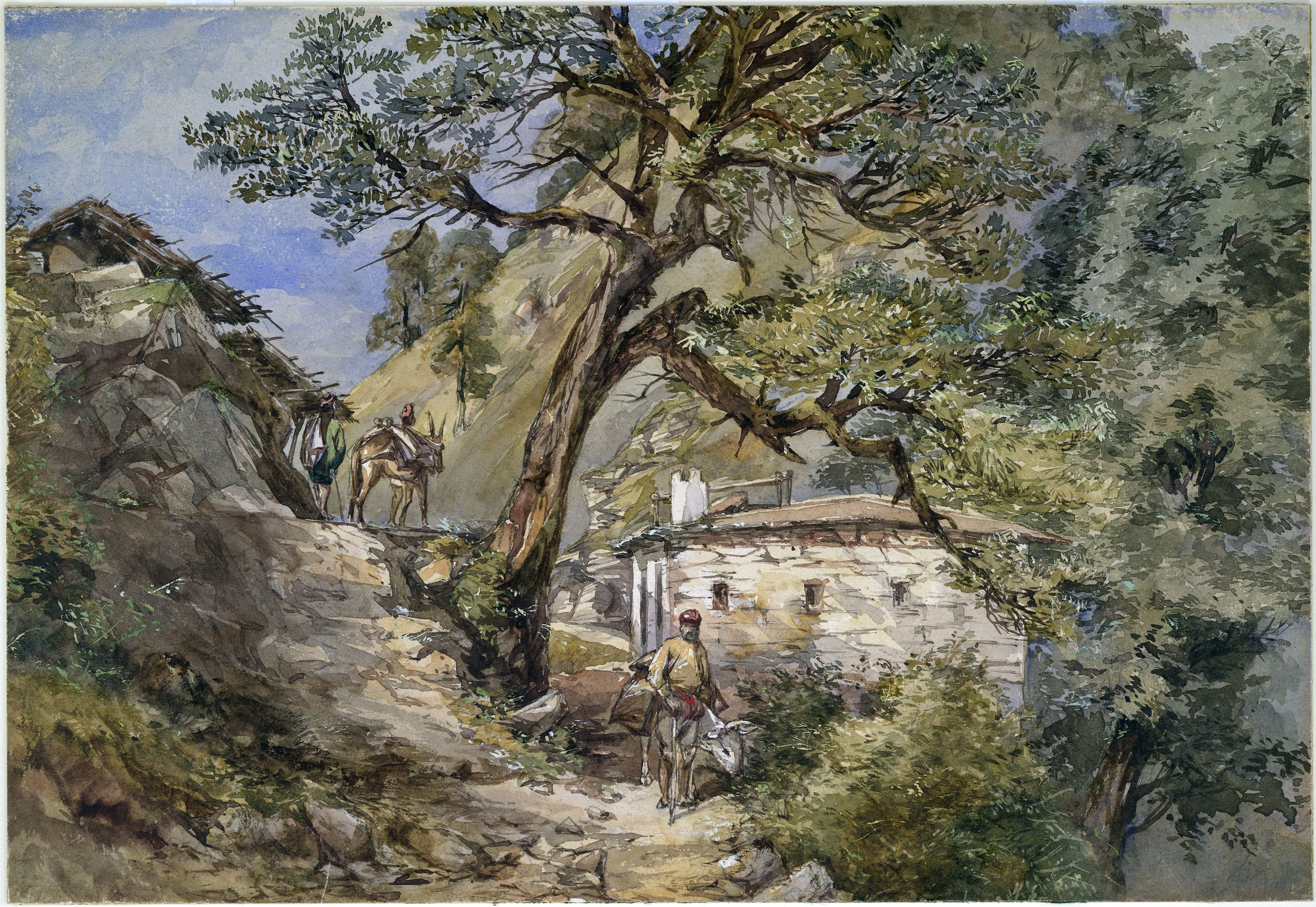
Landour in 1869.

Racially, Landour was distinctly and intentionally more European than Mussoorie. First, the army presence (albeit non-regimental) offered an excuse to keep out Indians. Second, Maharajas were encouraged to build grand summer homes, but were directed towards Mussoorie. Among them were the ruling families of Kapurthala, Nabha, Alwar, Jind, Baroda, Kasmanda, Katesar, Kuchesar and other princely states. And this despite Maharajas being hand-in-glove with the Raj in terms of ruling the Indian masses; the former, who remained nominally autonomous, legitimized the rule of the latter. No princely residences were ever built in Landour, with the exception of The Castle, built by the British as a quasi-prison. Even the ruling family of Tehri-Garhwal (from whom the region was seized by the British) had no residence in Landour, though the family later did acquire some properties from Britons who sold out. These racial barriers, while quite real, were more informal than formal; they began to weaken after World War I as the Indian freedom movement gained steam. The author Emily Eden, sister of the Governor-General Lord Auckland, wrote incisively about the biting racism of Britons towards all Indians (except Maharajas, whose over-the-top hospitality they craved), after spending much time in Landour, Shimla and Ooty in the late 1830s. Many Anglo-Indian families also put down roots in Landour, and in Barlowganj just below Mussoorie, in the 19th century. They were attracted in part by the schools, and by the sense of otherness versus quotidian India. A handful remain, most having emigrated after 1947.

The events of 1857 led to a spurt in the European population of Mussoorie-Landour, with many families leaving the exposed towns of the Gangetic Plain. Among the Britons who thus moved to Landour were the parents of Jim Corbett. Both had lost their spouses, and would meet and remarry in Landour (see below). His mother had moved from Meerut, where her first husband had been killed in action in 1857. Thousands of Europeans, mostly Britons, are buried in the twin towns. The Cantonment has adjacent Protestant and Catholic cemeteries, though due to overcrowding in the former, the latter has of late become non-denominational – they are managed by the same committee. In 1901, the town had a population of 1720, which climbed up to 3700 in the summers, when the heat of the Indian plains became unbearable.

=== Americans in the Himalaya ===
Aside from its British legacy, Landour has a thick vein of Americana too, with American missionaries having had a strong footing in the town since the 1830s, when the policy changes introduced by the English administrator Lord Macaulay prompted the rapid growth of American missions across India, particularly those of the Presbyterian and Baptist churches. Generations of American missionary children (third culture kids) were educated at Woodstock School and/or born in Landour (see John Birch, below). Of late, their descendants have been deeming a dekko{a look} worthwhile. Nowadays, many young Americans on gap years or on exchange programs spend time learning Hindi at the popular Landour Language School, which was founded in the late 19th century to teach newly arrived missionaries. Another durable reminder of the American connection is the ubiquitous Landour Community Cookbook (1st formal edition: 1938; informal stencil copies since c. 1900), though the Landour Community Centre—once the locus of Anglo-American community life—is itself moribund. A half-dozen bakers in Landour still offer various breads, cookies or biscuits and cakes from 'The Cookbook'. Landour was also one of the first places in India where an American classic such as peanut butter was made commercially. A number of houses in Landour have American (rather than British) names, among them Aloha, Hollywood and Roanoke.

== Geography ==
=== Topology ===
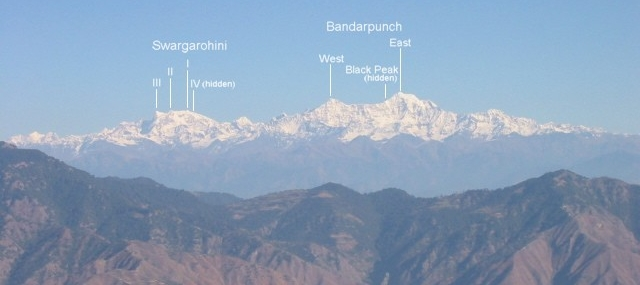
Swargarohini and Bandarpunch in the Himalaya, from Landour.

Landour is located in the Lower Western Himalaya, in the Mussoorie Range, the second of the five parallel folds of the Himalaya. On average, Landour is about 300 m (984 ft) above Mussoorie, which itself is mostly at an altitude of 2,073 to 2,377 m (6,800 to 7,798 ft).

Landour offers striking views of the Garhwal Himalaya, with a wide vista of up to 200 km (120 mi) visible on a clear day. The visible massifs and peaks include (West to East) Swargarohini, Bandarpunch, Yamunotri, Jaonli, Gangotri, Srikanta, Kedarnath, Satopanth, Chaukhamba (Badrinath) and even Nanda Devi. At its closest point, Tibet is about 110 kilometres (70 mi) away as the crow flies; it is through Landour that Heinrich Harrer escaped to Tibet during World War II after breaking out of a British internment camp in Dehradun.

If one travels the 290 km (180 mi) to Landour from New Delhi by train or bus, a switch at Dehradun is needed. Buses, taxis, and shared taxis are easily available. There are also direct buses from New Delhi, and taxis are available at any of New Delhi's railway stations or at the Delhi airport. There are 40-minute flights from Delhi to Jolly Grant Airport east of Dehradun; to Landour from the airport is a further 90-minute drive.

East of Landour lie the small hamlet of Dhanaulti and the Surkhanda Devi temple; further east are Kanatal, Tehri (now submerged by the Tehri dam) and Chamba (not to be confused with the town and district of the same name in Himachal Pradesh). And to the West lie Kempty Falls, the military town of Chakrata and the region of Jaunsar bordering Himachal Pradesh.

=== Climate ===
Landour during rains.

The town lies largely on an east–west ridge, with a prominent southerly spur connecting its western end to Mussoorie. The altitude differential, aided by Landour being partly Tibet-facing, has a marked effect on the temperature, which can be 2–3 °C (36–37 °F) lower than in Mussoorie. During the monsoon, Landour receives almost daily rainfall, often heavy. Additionally, pre- and post-monsoon showers mean a rainy season that can run from May to September, though it can be shorter. Before the rains arrive, April–May is the warmest period, with the temperatures rising to over 30 °C (86 °F) on hotter days. December to February is particularly cold, especially if one there is a lack of enough direct sunlight, as on the northern slopes. It can snow anywhere between 3 and 15 times in the winter, at times heavily. In a given year Landour receives perhaps twice the snow that Mussoorie does; it also takes longer to melt especially on the north-facing slopes.

Climate data for Landour, Mussoorie (1971–2000, extremes 1901–1987)
Month	Jan	Feb	Mar	Apr	May	Jun	Jul	Aug	Sep	Oct	Nov	Dec	Year
Record high °C (°F)	21.1 (70.0)	23.3 (73.9)	26.1 (79.0)	29.1 (84.4)	34.4 (93.9)	31.7 (89.1)	29.4 (84.9)	25.6 (78.1)	27.2 (81.0)	28.1 (82.6)	25.0 (77.0)	23.3 (73.9)	34.4 (93.9)
Mean daily maximum °C (°F)	10.3 (50.5)	11.2 (52.2)	15.7 (60.3)	20.6 (69.1)	23.0 (73.4)	23.2 (73.8)	20.9 (69.6)	20.5 (68.9)	19.8 (67.6)	18.6 (65.5)	15.5 (59.9)	12.7 (54.9)	17.6 (63.7)
Mean daily minimum °C (°F)	2.8 (37.0)	3.4 (38.1)	7.1 (44.8)	11.5 (52.7)	14.3 (57.7)	15.6 (60.1)	15.0 (59.0)	14.8 (58.6)	13.6 (56.5)	11.1 (52.0)	7.6 (45.7)	4.5 (40.1)	10.0 (50.0)
Record low °C (°F)	−5.0 (23.0)	−6.7 (19.9)	−2.5 (27.5)	−1.5 (29.3)	3.7 (38.7)	4.1 (39.4)	11.7 (53.1)	7.4 (45.3)	1.3 (34.3)	2.6 (36.7)	−2.1 (28.2)	−3.9 (25.0)	−6.7 (19.9)
Average rainfall mm (inches)	49.9 (1.96)	65.2 (2.57)	73.1 (2.88)	56.2 (2.21)	69.0 (2.72)	200.9 (7.91)	629.6 (24.79)	548.0 (21.57)	264.5 (10.41)	55.5 (2.19)	14.9 (0.59)	10.1 (0.40)	2,036.8 (80.19)
Average rainy days	4.1	5.0	5.1	3.8	5.0	9.5	22.4	21.3	11.6	2.7	0.9	1.3	92.7
Average relative humidity (%) (at 17:30 IST)	78	75	66	56	58	70	85	87	85	78	75	75	74

== Ecology ==
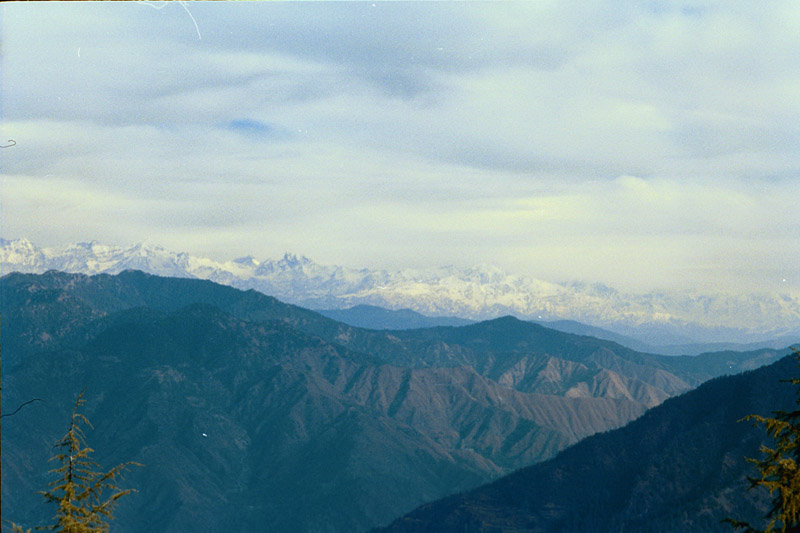
The view of forested Himalayas from near Char Dukan in Landour, upper Mussoorie

=== Flora ===
Landour is for the most part (unlike largely deforested Mussoorie) carpeted by old-growth forests of deodar cedar, Himalayan oak, chir pine, blue pine, West Himalayan fir, Himalayan maple, rhododendron, Himalayan manna ash and other tree species. Landour's north-facing slopes have more deodar and fir than other species; the south-facing slopes have more oak than other species. Pines are at lower elevations than deodar and fir. Among introduced species, the adaptable Platycladus (Hindi: morpankhi) does well, and Oriental plane (Hindi: chinar) too are seen. A logging ban has long been in place in the reserved forests around Landour, and the ban is reasonably well enforced.

=== Fauna ===
Birdlife is outstanding in its breadth of species; over 350 species may comfortably be seen at various elevations over the course of the year, including both endemic species and migratory species from Tibet, Central Asia and Siberia. Quite a few endemic species of pheasants and raptors are among the more charismatic species that can be easily seen. As for wild mammals, leopards transit the area from time to time; their prey are mainly dogs, including strays from Landour-Mussoorie and the neighboring villages. Also present are some jackals, barking deer (muntjac), goral (goat-antelope) and the secretive sloth bear. Among smaller mammals, yellow-throated martens, civets, jungle cats, and Himalayan weasels are seen, and the occasional flying squirrel. Rhesus macaques and Hanuman langurs are as present in Landour as anywhere. Poaching has severely reduced the numbers of the larger wild mammals, though the habitat itself could support larger populations. Most charismatic megafauna had already been wiped out by the British in the 19th century; the area's history includes Captain Young's "discovery" of Mussoorie on a shooting expedition from his garrison in Dehradun. The ecology of the area clearly shows that tiger, Himalayan black bear, striped hyena, sambar, serow, Himalayan tahr, gaur and other species (all are now locally extinct) were well represented in Mussoorie-Landour before British colonization; 19th-century writings by British hunters boast of the countless trophies they collected in the area.

== Demographics ==
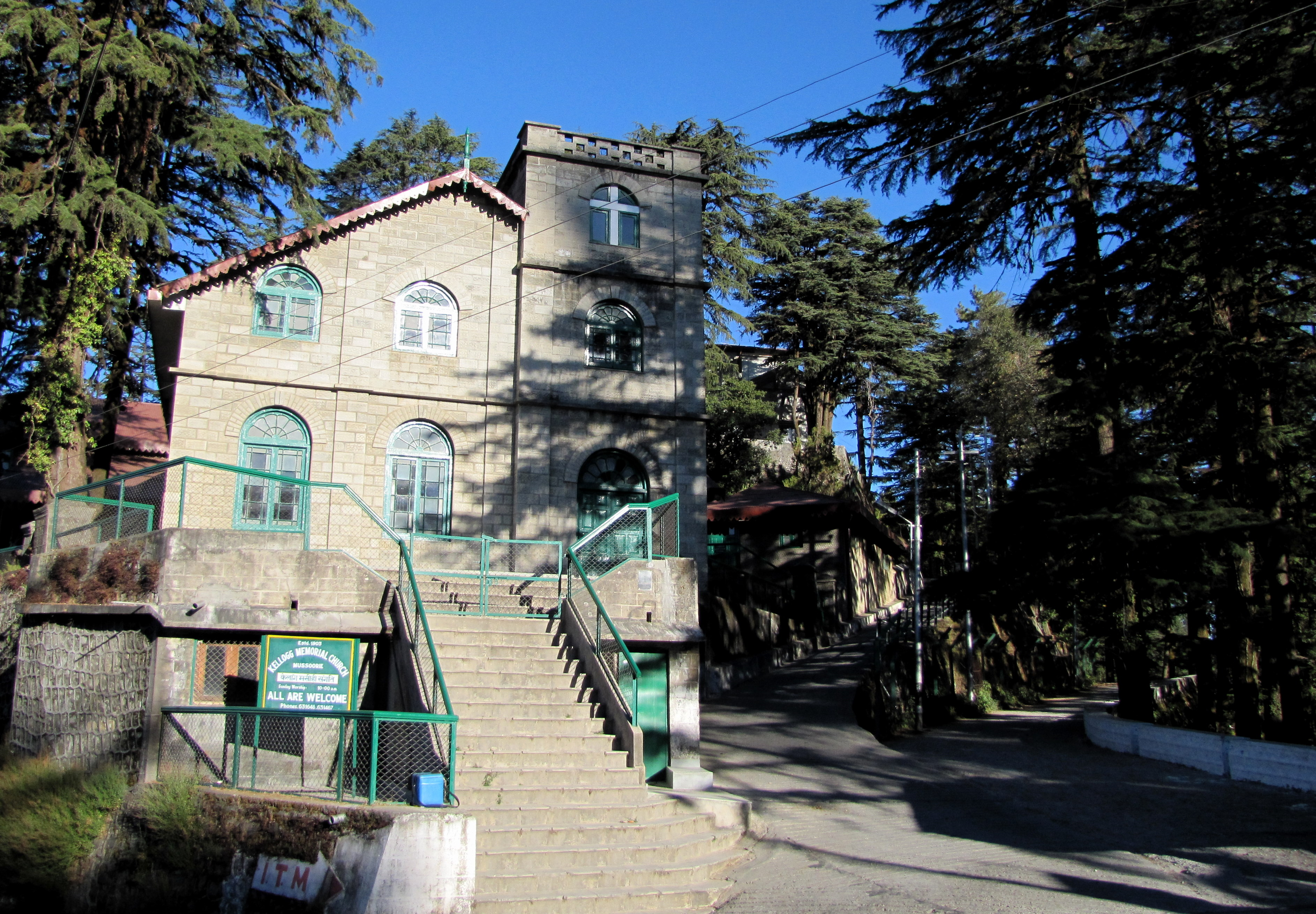
Kellogg Memorial Church, Landour, built 1903.

=== Census ===
According to the 2001 India census, Landour had an official population of roughly 3,500. Males constitute 55% of the population and females 45%. Landour has an average literacy rate of 78%, higher than the national average of 59.5%: male literacy is 85%, and female literacy is 70%. In Landour, 8% of the population is under 6 years of age. However, these statistics do not account for the transient population of the Cantonment, which includes military personnel on study tours, or the "second home" crowd that owns many of the properties in Landour Cantonment. Nor does it account for the student population at Woodstock or the language school.

The year-round population of the Cantonment is under 1,200, and if including Landour Bazaar it is under 4,000. The summertime population of Mussoorie triples to perhaps 90,000 with the influx of budget tourists (and hotel staff, shopkeepers, tradesmen etc. to service them), but the population of Landour Bazaar only goes up by perhaps 1,000, given the paucity of hotels. But the summertime population of the Cantonment goes up by only 500, if that; there is no place for outsiders to stay. The weekend population of Mussoorie proper too now spurts—year-round—to near-summertime levels, given the improvements in India's highways and the ever-rising numbers of private cars.

=== Ethnic mix ===
The ethnic mix of Landour has changed dramatically since 1947, and since the 1970s and 1980s due to the departure of most missionaries, and also via the recent Indian economic boom. Many of the shopkeepers and small-business owners of Landour Bazaar and the Cantonment are descended from bania merchants who came from far afield in the 19th century—as far away as Gujarat and Bombay—to service the then-growing Anglo-American community.

=== Notable residents ===
Landour also has an outsized presence on the cultural map of India, its most famous resident being the Anglo-Indian author Ruskin Bond. Bond lives in Ivy Cottage in Landour, which is right next to a Tibetan cafe called Doma's Inn. The cafe is a popular spot that is also sometimes visited by Bond himself. Another thespian, Tom Alter, himself Landour-raised and a Woodstock School graduate, was a part-year resident, spending the remainder of his time in Bollywood. His cousin Stephen Alter, also a Woodstock alum and an "Indo-nostalgic" author, is often in town for long stretches. Stephen's father Bob Alter, a reverend, had been principal of Woodstock in the 1970s and 1980s. The media moguls Prannoy Roy and Radhika Roy, founders of NDTV, also maintain a second home in Landour. The Hindi film director Vishal Bhardwaj has a house in Landour and is the next door neighbour to Ruskin Bond. Another famous resident of the town is the Indian actor Victor Banerjee.

Landour was home in the 1850s and 1860s to Australian novelist and lawyer John Lang, seen as the "first Australian novelist". Lang's 1864 grave was rediscovered by Ruskin Bond in Camel's Back Cemetery in Mussoorie and was restored by the Australian High Commission in Delhi (which also has a bolthole nearby).

Other bohemians who call Mussoorie (but not Landour) home are the writer Bill Aitken, the husband-wife travel-writing team of Hugh and Colleen Gantzer, and Allan Sealy (writer of The Trotter-Nama), down in the valley in Dehradun. Finally, Landour was the birthplace in 1918 of John Birch, in whose name the controversial arch-conservative John Birch Society would be founded in America, after his murder in China at the hand of Communists. Landour has, in large part, survived untouched due to the military presence and to its small size.

== Administration ==
=== Civic administration ===
Since Landour is a cantonment town, it is administered by the cantonment board which is under the control of the Ministry of Defence. The Station Commander of the Cantonment is the ex-officio president of the board, and an officer of the IDES or Defence Estates Organisation is the chief executive officer who is also the member-secretary of the board. The President of Landour Cantonment Board is Brig. SN Singh while the CEO is Smt Ankita Singh, IDES. Councillors, or representatives of citizens, are elected from six wards in Landour.

=== Cantonment ===
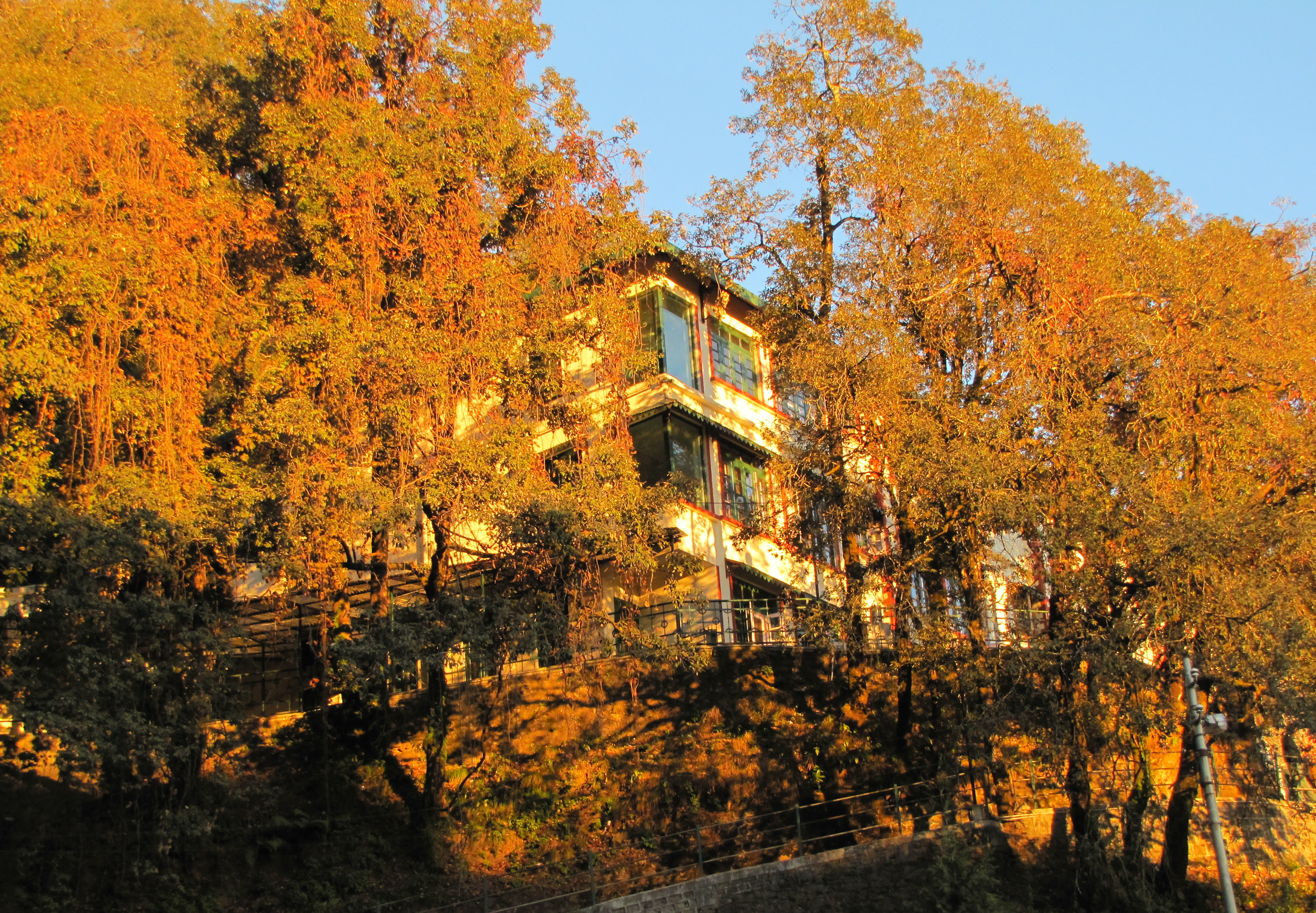
Landour Community Hospital, originally established 1931.

There are under 100 detached private homes in the Cantonment, and under 200 buildings overall. The non-residential buildings belong to either the military, or to the state-owned broadcasters Doordarshan and All India Radio, who have repeater stations atop Lal Tibba hill, at over 7,700 ft. the highest point in all of Mussoorie-Landour. The transmitters are mounted on an Eiffel-inspired orange-and-white tower that is the most recognizable feature in all of Landour. Lal Tibba was also known as Depot Hill, referring to the convalescent depot. Nearby Sisters Bazaar likewise referred to the nurses' dormitory at the location; nurses are still addressed as 'Sister' in the Subcontinent, from a time in the 19th century when most nurses were Anglican, Methodist or Catholic nuns. The Cantonment is also home to the well-known Landour Community Hospital, founded by American missionaries. At the time of its founding in 1931 it was one of the first good non-military hospitals in the region. It has been run by the Emmanuel Hospital Association, an indigenous Christian health and development agency, since 1981, and continues to provide affordable (or free) medical care to the people of Landour and the surrounding hills.

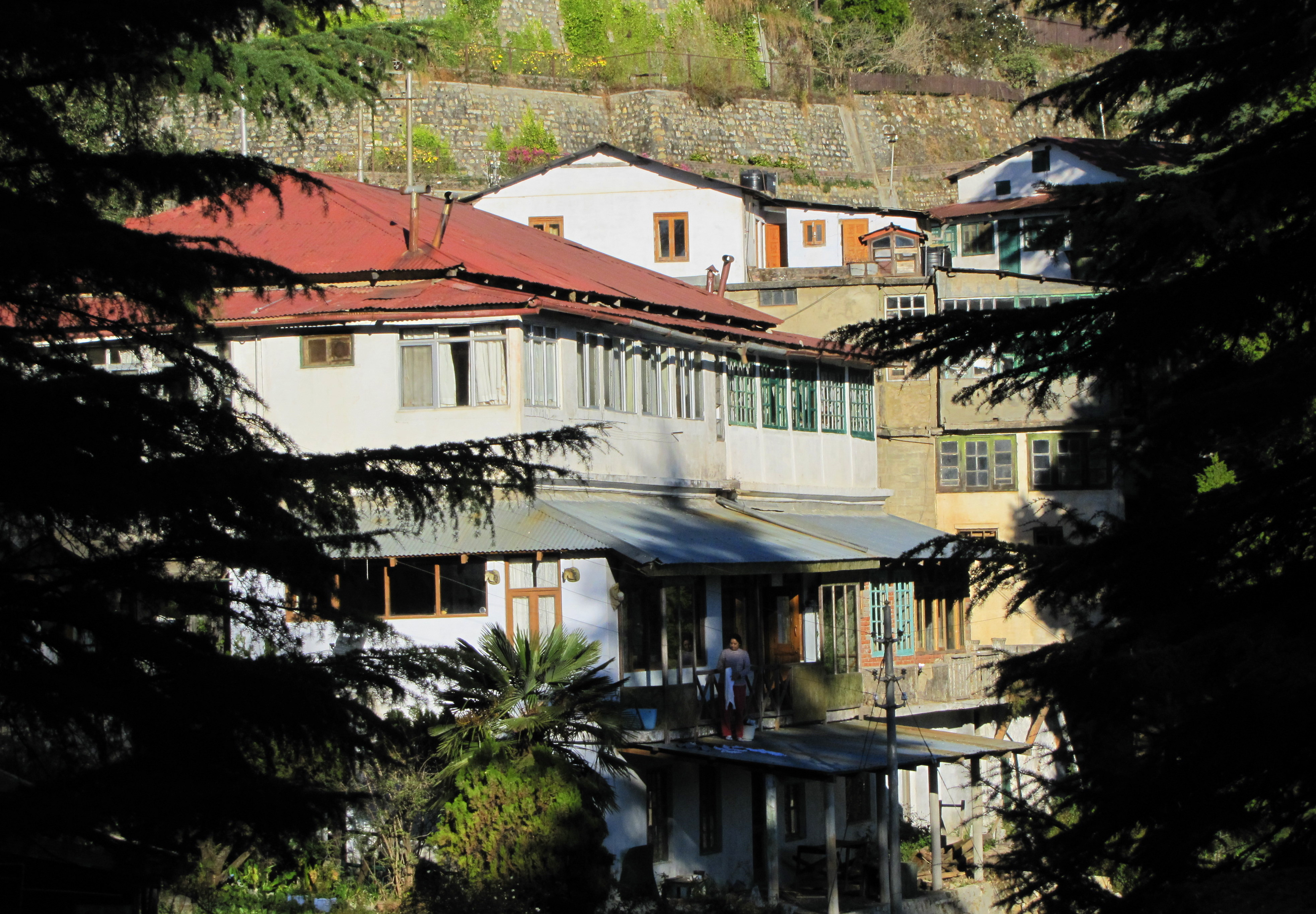
Sisters Bazaar

Among natural features in the area, the local peaks are the most prominent. (Tibba is a local word for hill/peak). Other than "Old" Lal Tibba and Landour hill themselves (which lie within the Cantonment), there is the hunched, heavily forested Pari Tibba (also called Fairy Hill or Witches' Hill), lurking due south of Woodstock School and due east of Wynberg-Allen School. Once a private hunting estate of the ruling family of Tehri-Garhwal, it was not deforested for that very reason. It is also called Burnt Hill, referring to the unusual number of lightning strikes it has taken over the years, which has given rise to local superstitions and also helped keep it free of humans. The hill remains a popular hiking spot for the local boarding schools, but not having motorable roads is blessedly free of "tourism". Due north of Landour, 16 km (9.9 mi) away as the crow flies is Nag Tibba ('Serpent's Peak'), at 3,022 m (9,915 ft) the highest peak in the local region. It lends its name to the Nag Tibba Range, itself the next-northerly of the five folds of the Himalaya. To the east of Landour are Tope Tibba and the oddly shaped Pepperpot mountain; both are hiking destinations.

There are no commercial hotels in Landour Cantonment, and only a handful of rudimentary, quasi-legal guest houses. Landour Bazaar has fewer than 10 basic hotels. Mussoorie proper, however, has over a hundred hotels at various price points. There were never any entertainments in Landour – all the Raj-era theaters, cinemas, dance halls, skating rinks and public gardens were in Mussoorie.

== Economy ==
=== Education ===
Like Mussoorie and Dehradun, Landour has long been a centre of secondary education. The towns have had several schools and so-called orphanages for both European and mixed-race Anglo-Indian children since the mid-19th century. The term orphanage was often a Raj-era euphemism for a school for illegitimate mixed-race children. Also, there were many missionary-run schools, of which the most well-known was, and remains, Woodstock School, founded in 1854 for the children of American missionaries. Practically all of the other prominent schools including Wynberg Allen School, St. George's School, Mussoorie Public School, Waverley Convent (now CJM) and Vincent Hill (now Guru Nanak 5th Centenary School) are in Mussoorie,. The Indian Army also runs a primary school in Landour Cantonment.

=== Tourism ===
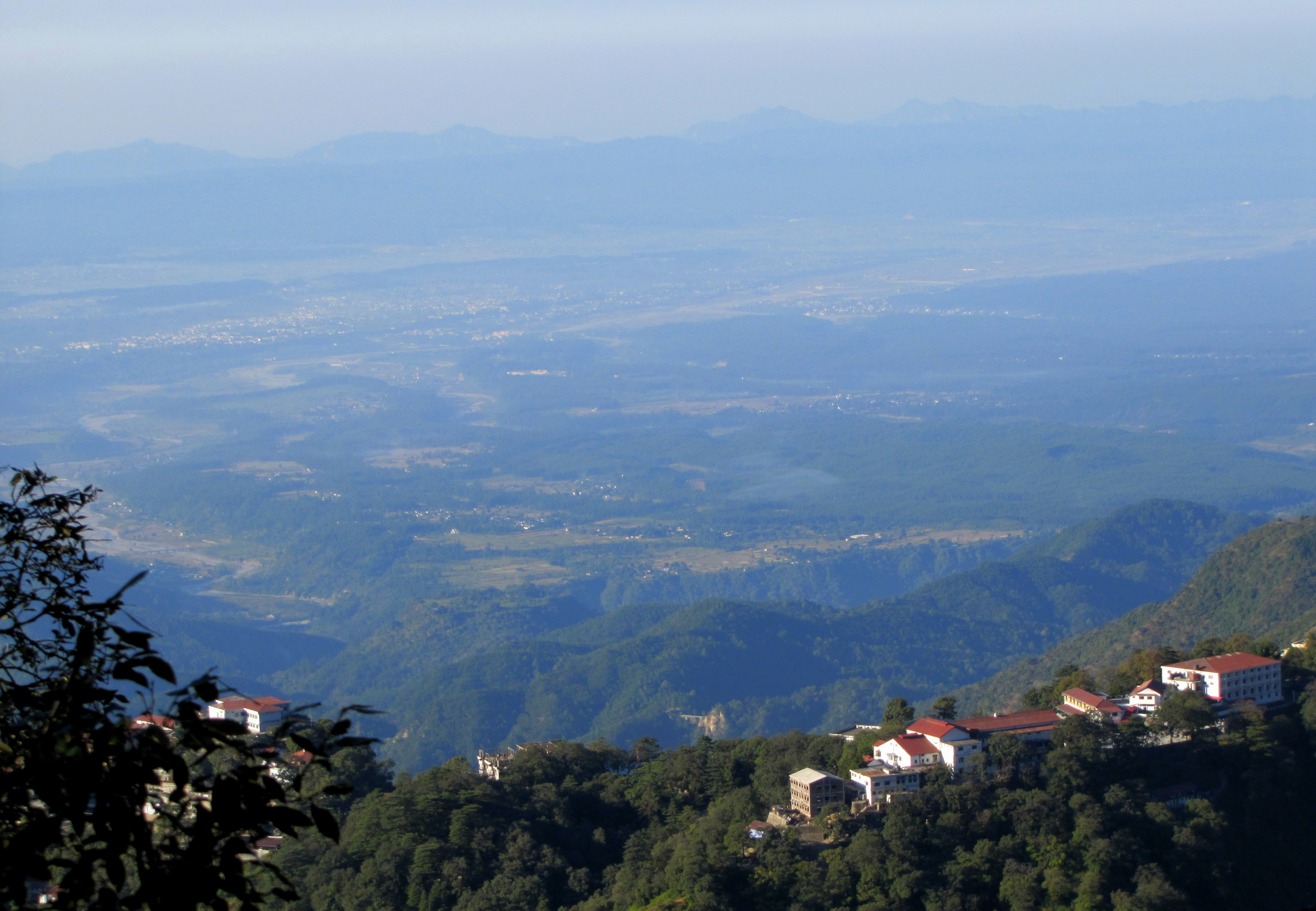
A view of the valley from Landour, Uttarakhand.

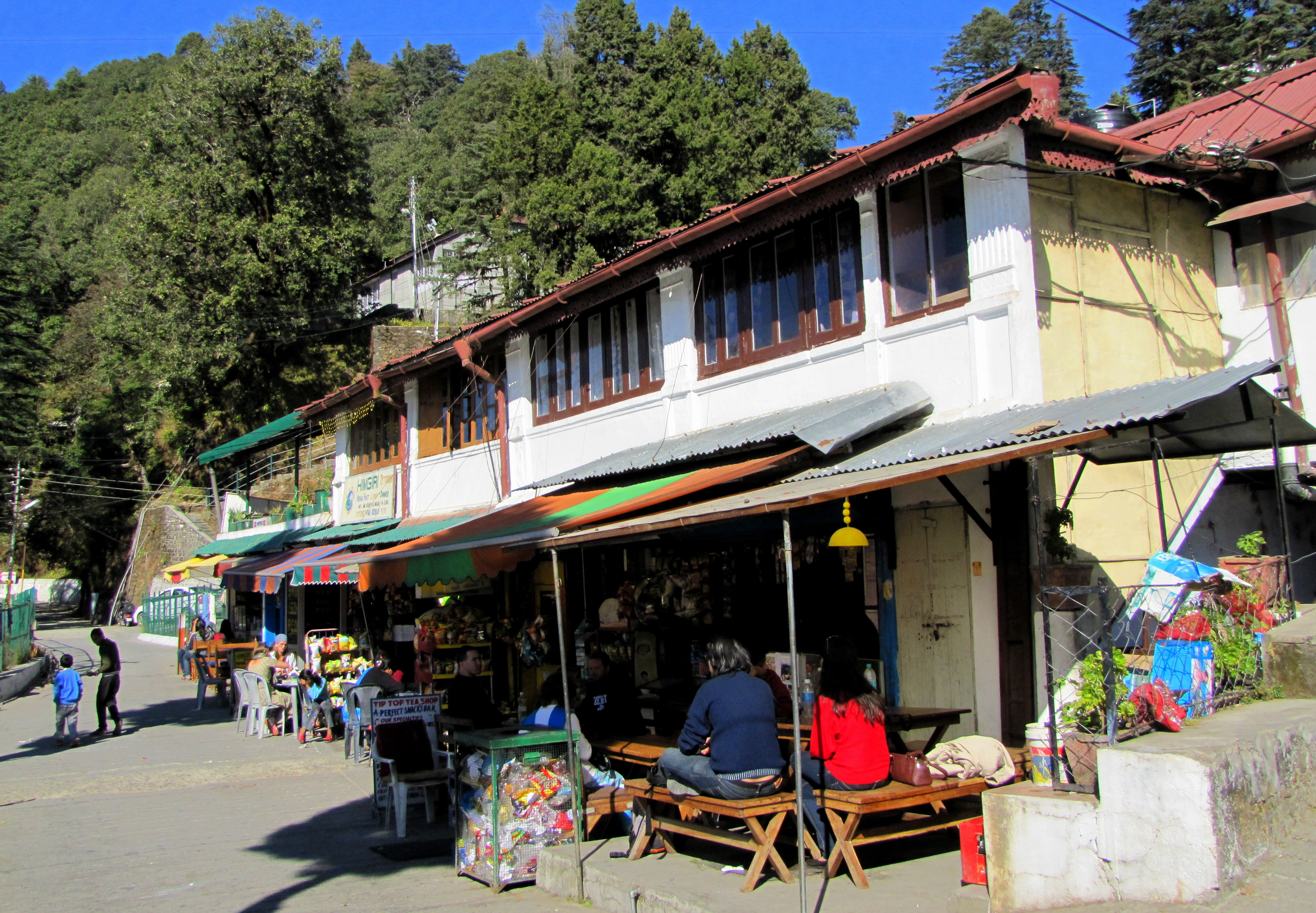
Char Dukan literally Four Shops, Landour

Architecturally speaking, Landour is akin to other Raj-era hill stations of Northern India. Since Mussoorie-Landour never rivalled Shimla in administrative, political or military terms, there are few grand official buildings. The private homes are largely the common Raj-era pastiches, with pitched roofs (often painted a dull red) and large verandahs, important given the heavy monsoons. Most houses contain architectural echoes both of Home Counties England and of the resort towns of the Scottish Highlands. Many have well-kept gardens.

About the only architecturally significant building was The Castle on the aptly named Castle Hill, now part of Survey of India, where the deposed boy-king Duleep Singh of Punjab, the son of the iconic Maharaja Ranjit Singh, was often kept for convalescent purposes between 1849 and 1853. (The Castle was heavily modified in an ad hoc manner over the decades, rendering it unrecognizable as compared to early photographs). The Amir of Afghanistan too was in the town in quasi-exile at various times in the early 20th century as Raj officials engaged in their customary machinations of map-drawing and re-drawing across the Subcontinent.

A prominent local landmark was the Clock Tower at the start of Landour Bazaar. It was of little architectural merit, but informally marked the boundary between Landour and Mussoorie (others say it is the former Picture Palace movie theater a bit lower down). Demolished in 2011, the tower is expected to be rebuilt sometime in the future, having been delayed by local political wrangling.

Landour has four Raj-era churches, two of them distinctly Indo-Gothic in style. Of the four, two remain very much in use: Kellogg Church (built 1903, once American Presbyterian, now non-denominational, and also home to the Landour Language School) and the St. Paul's Church (built 1840, once Anglican, now non-denominational) in Char Dukan, where Jim Corbett's parents, Christopher and Mary Corbett, married on 13 October 1859. A third Methodist church in Landour Bazaar fell into disuse after the Raj ended and was eventually seized by squatters for commercial purposes by way of kabza. The fourth church is the once-Anglican St. Peter's Church, latterly Catholic; it is located atop Landour hill and is now in disuse.

== Issues ==
=== Deforestation ===
Deforestation itself dates from British times. Clear-felling was used, except in the Cantonment due to the 1924 Act. Many reforestation initiatives began in various hill stations in the late 19th century at the initiative of various Raj administrators, but not in Mussoorie. Of late, the Indian Army has done yeoman service via its Eco-Battalions in terms of re-forestation.

=== Non-biodegradable refuse ===
Non-biodegradable refuse, dumped down hillsides and eaten by langurs, macaques, civets, stray dogs and other animals, is a challenge in the area; there have been some steps by the citizenry to combat it. Woodstock School, which remains the largest landowner in Landour behind the Indian Army, has collected used plastics from across Landour, but its efforts are more effective within and around their campus than elsewhere in Landour.

== In popular media ==
- Landour Days: A Writer's Journal by Ruskin Bond. Penguin, 2002. ISBN 0-670-91170-4.
- Resorts of the Raj, by Vikram Bhatt (1998).
- Hill Stations of India, by Gillian Wright (1991).
- Mussoorie: Jewel of the Hills, by Ruskin Bond (1996).
- Mussoorie & Landour: Days of Wine and Roses, by Ruskin Bond (1992).
- Birding in the Doon Valley, by Nikhil Devasar, S.B. Dutta & Santanu Sarkar [Editor] (2012).
- Plain Tales from the Raj, by Charles Allen (1975).
- Magic Mountains: Hill Stations and the British Raj (1996).
- All the Way to Heaven: An American Boyhood in the Himalaya, by Stephen Alter (1998).
- Raj: The Making and Unmaking of British India, by Lawrence James (2000).
- Memsahibs: The Women of Victorian India, by Pat Barr (1976).
- Footloose in the Himalayas, by Bill Aitken (2003).
- Touching Upon the Himalaya, by Bill Aitken & Geeta Kapadia (2004).
- Stones of Empire, by Jan Morris (1995).
- India Unveiled, by Bob Arnett (2006).
- Knowing Dil Das, by Joe Alter (1999).
- The Great Hill Stations of Asia, by Barbara Crossette (1999).
- Hill Resorts of the U.P. Himalaya, by Nutan Tyagi (1991).
- Farewell the Winterline, by Stan Brush (2002).
