= Doiwala =

- Municipality, Block and tehsil
- Location in Uttarakhand, India Doiwala (India)
- Coordinates: 30°10′33″N 78°07′27″E
- Country: INDIA-IN
- State: Uttarakhand-UK
- District: Dehradun
- Tehsil / Sub Division: Doiwala
- Founder: Named after numerous objects made by wood sticks (Doi)

Government
  - Type: Municipality(Urban) & Block(Rural)
  - Body: Doiwala Nagar Palika Parishad & Vikas Khand Doiwala
  - Chairman: Narendra Negi [BJP]
  - Block Pramukh: Gaurav Singh "Ginni" [INC]
  - MLA: Brij Bhushan Gairola [BJP]
- Elevation: 485 m (1,591 ft)

Population (2025)
  - Total: ~12,500

Languages
  - Official: Hindi
  - Native: Garhwali, Khariboli
- Time zone: UTC+5:30 (IST)
- PIN: 248140
- Telephone code: 0135
- Vehicle registration: UK07 (Dehradun RTO)
- Website: http://nppdoiwala.com/

Doiwala is a nagar palika and a tehsil (sub-division) of Dehradun district in the state of Uttarakhand, India. It is situated nearly 20 km from the district headquarters, Dehradun.

== History ==
During the rule of the Garhwal kings, Doiwala was a village. However, with the arrival of the railway line, Doiwala transformed into a market town. During the time of the Gorkha and Garhwal kings, Doiwala was a small village located in the Dehradun region. When the British gained control of Doiwala in 1821, agricultural activities began on the land surrounding the area, and these areas developed in the form of grants. This is why there are several grants located in the Doiwala area. These include Markham Grant, Majri Grant, Jolly Grant, Simlas Grant, Rainapur Grant which are prominent. Train services on the Haridwar-Dehradun railway line began on March 1, 1900. On this day, Doiwala railway station came into existence. Gradually, the areas around Grant began to develop, and Doiwala became a small market town. The first school in Doiwala opened in 1901. The first hospital was also established there that same year. In 1933, the Janaki Sugar Mill was established near the railway station. It was founded jointly by the rulers of the Jabbal Estate and the local Haveliya family. Jollygrant Airport in Doiwala was constructed in the year 1974. Doiwala is also the birthplace of brave freedom fighters like the late Durga Mal and Colonel Pritam Singh Sandhu. A major achievement for Doiwala in the past decade has been the establishment of the Himalayan Institute Hospital near Jolly Grant Airport. It was founded by Swami Rama in 1994.

== Geography ==
Doiwala is located at 30.18°N 78.12°E. It has an average elevation of 485 metres (1,591 feet) above sea level. The place comes under Doon Valley's Terai region. Doiwala is a lush-green town surrounded by four forest ranges namely Ramgarh Forest Range, Lacchiwala Forest Range, Barkot Forest Range & Thano Forest Range. Doiwala has a large area of agricultural & farm lands with massive agricultural activities. Two seasonal rivers mainly song river & suswa river flow through Doiwala. It is notable for its location near the centre of the triangle formed by the three important famous and cultural regions of Uttarakhand - Dehradun, Haridwar and Rishikesh, all three regions being within an hour's drive of the town. Doiwala lies on NH07 between Dehradun & Haridwar. It has a railway station named "Doiwala" which lies on Dehradun-Delhi Rail. There are daily trains from Doiwala to major destinations like Delhi, Amritsar, Ludhiana, Chandigarh, Bareilly, Ghaziabad, Moradabad, Saharanpur, Roorkee, Haridwar, Varanasi & Lucknow. It also has an airport named Jollygrant Airport, 5 km from main town with domestic flights bound to major important cities like Delhi, Mumbai, Bengaluru, Hyderabad, Ahmedabad, Kolkata, Ranchi, Patna, Lucknow, Jaipur.

== Demographics ==
Doiwala had a population of around 12,500 approx. in 2025, its administrative reach being the 1791 houses in the region. Males constitute 53.5% of the population and females 46.5%, giving the town a sex ratio of 869, significantly below the national average. Doiwala has an average literacy rate of 90.1%, higher than the national average of 74.4%: male literacy is 93.8% and female literacy is 85.8%. In Doiwala, 10.8% of the population is under 6 years of age.

== Government and politics ==
Doiwala is an urban town which is administered by a Nagar Palika Parishad at the local level headed by a chairman. It is divided into 20 wards, each of which has a locally elected councillor. Doiwala is also a constituency of Uttarakhand Legislative Assembly as 23- Doiwala. Doiwala constituency comes under Haridwar Lok Sabha constituency.

Doiwala also has a Kshetra Panchayat (Block) headed by Block Pramukh under Zila Panchayat Dehradun. Doiwala Kshetra Panchayat (Block) has a total of 38 Gram Panchayats in it which are headed by respective Gram Pradhans.

== Police and administration ==
It has a local police station as "Kotwali Doiwala" headed by Inspector rank police official. The general administration of Doiwala is headed by a Sub Divisional Magistrate (SDM) Doiwala. Revenue administration is headed by Tehsildar Doiwala with jurisdiction over 65 revenue villages under Doiwala Tehsil. It also has a Junior division civil court which is under jurisdiction of Dehradun District court.

== Health care ==
The area has a major speciality hospital as Jolly Grant Hospital 3 km from Doiwala. Other hospitals include Aryan Hospital and Government Hospital (CHC Doiwala). Uttaranchal Dental & Medical Research Institute (UDMRI) is located at Majri Grant 3 km from Doiwala Town.

== Schools and colleges ==
=== Schools ===
1. Renaissance Dron School(CBSE New Delhi)
2. Nancy International School(CBSE New Delhi)
3. The Presidency International School (ICSE New Delhi)
4. Radiant Public School, kudkawala (CBSE New Delhi)
5. Dehradun Hills Academy, Dudhli Road (CBSE, New Delhi est. 1990)
6. Mount Lietra Zee School (CBSE New Delhi)
7. Doon Public School
8. The Horizon School (CBSE New Delhi)
9. Holy Angel Sen. Sec. School (CBSE New Delhi)
10. DRL Memorial Academy, Kudkawala (est. 2008)
11. Ahilya Bai Holker Smriti Vidhyalaya, Kudkawala (est. 1997)
12. Public inter college (Govt-aid Management school), Doiwala

=== Colleges ===
1. Swami Rama Himalayan University
2. CIPET : Centre for Skilling and Technical Support (CSTS), Doiwala (est. 2018)
3. Shaheed Durgamall Govt PG Degree College, Doiwala (est. 2001)
4. Doon Ghati College, Premnagar Bazaar

== Religious composition of population ==
Hindus make up 80.2% of the population, followed by Muslims at 10.1% and Sikhs at 9.1%. Being a part of Dehradun district, Garhwali population is widespread in the nearby town Bhaniyawala, where many of the residents of the old Tehri city were relocated to. Nearby villages like Nunawala, Sherghar, Jhabrawala, Kheri, Bulawala, Chandmari follow mostly Sikhism. Major Indian festivals like Diwali, Eid, Republic and Independence Day, Holi, Vijaydashmi, Gurpurab are celebrated with delight in the region. Other local festivals include the famous Jhanda Mela, Lohri, Guru Gobind Jayanti, Baisakhi, Guru Arjan Sahib ji Shaheedi Divas, Guru Granth Sahib ji first Parkash Purab Divas and Chotey Sahibzade Shaheedi Divas. Popular Western celebrations like Christmas, Valentine's Day, New Year's Eve etc. have also found acceptance in the area and are celebrated with glee. Ravidassis are also spread throughout the town.

== Climate ==
The climate of Doiwala is generally temperate, although it varies from tropical in summers to severely cold, depending upon the season and the altitude of the specific location. Doiwala is rarely known to fall below 0 °C(32 °F). Summer temperatures can reach as high as 43 °C(109.4 °F) whereas winter temperatures can fall as low as −0.5 °C(31.5 °F). During the monsoon season, there is often heavy and protracted rainfall. Doiwala and other plains areas of Uttarakhand see almost as much rainfall as Coastal Maharashtra and Assam.

== Languages ==
Hindi, Khariboli, Punjabi and Garhwali are the major spoken and native languages in Doiwala and nearby villages. Urdu and English are also quite prevalent. Administratively, English and Hindi are the two most common languages.

== Notable locations ==
1. Rajaji National Park
2. Nature Park, Lachhiwala
3. Gurdwara Guru Nanak Langar Hall, on NH 72, Near Song River Bridge
4. Jolly Grant Airport, 5 km from Doiwala
5. Doiwala Railway Station
6. Sugar Mill Factory
7. Lal Tappar industrial area
8. Fakhruddin Ali Ahmed Satellite Earth Station
9. Rambagh, Chandmari
