= Winterline =

False horizon from mountains at dusk

Winterline or winter line is the term used to describe the false horizon formed at dusk and is visible from certain mountainous parts of the world. The reason for its formation is not clear, but it has been reported that "experts" believe it occurs due to refraction of light when the dust particles, moisture, and smog, rising from the plains below, meet the cooler mountain air, and a 'second horizon' is formed. It is visible from many places throughout the Himalayas and is very prominent from Mizoram, Shimla and Mussoorie and from hilly regions of Himachal Pradesh and Uttarakhand in India between October and February, and the local Mussoorie Winterline Carnival is named after the phenomenon. Apart from India, winterline occurs in the Swiss Alps.

== Gallery ==
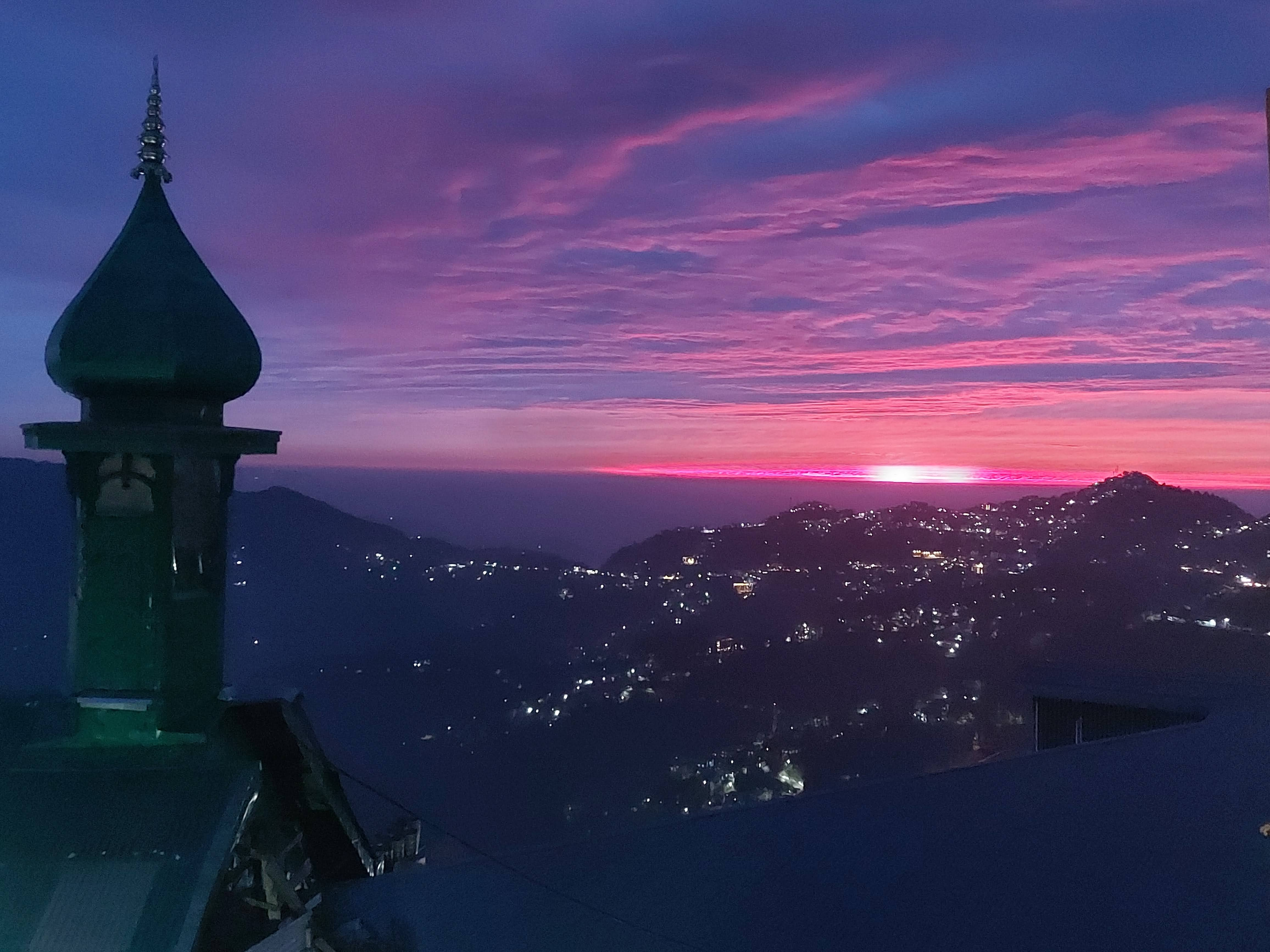
Winterline view from Shimla Mall Road

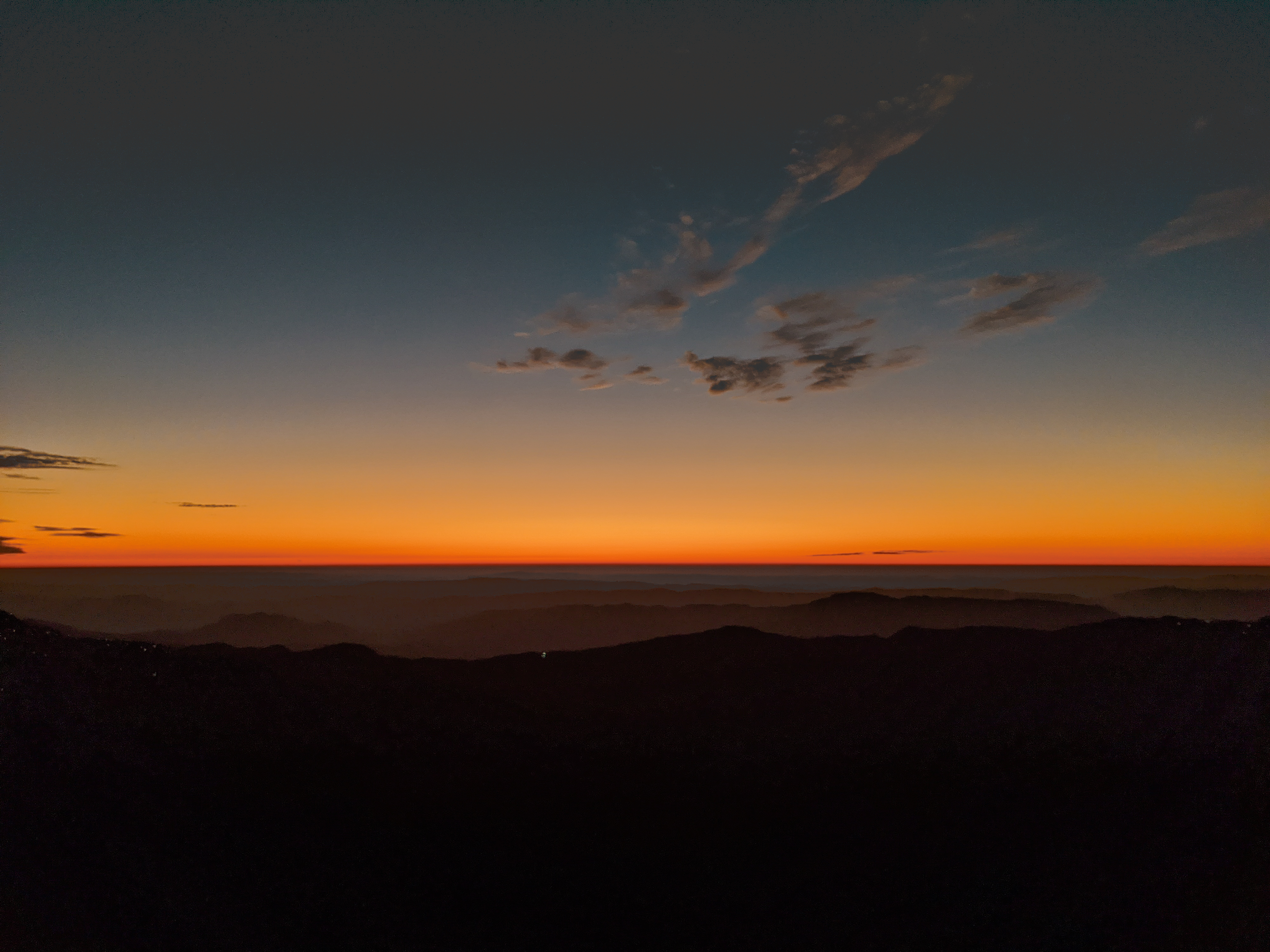
Winterline as visible from Mizoram

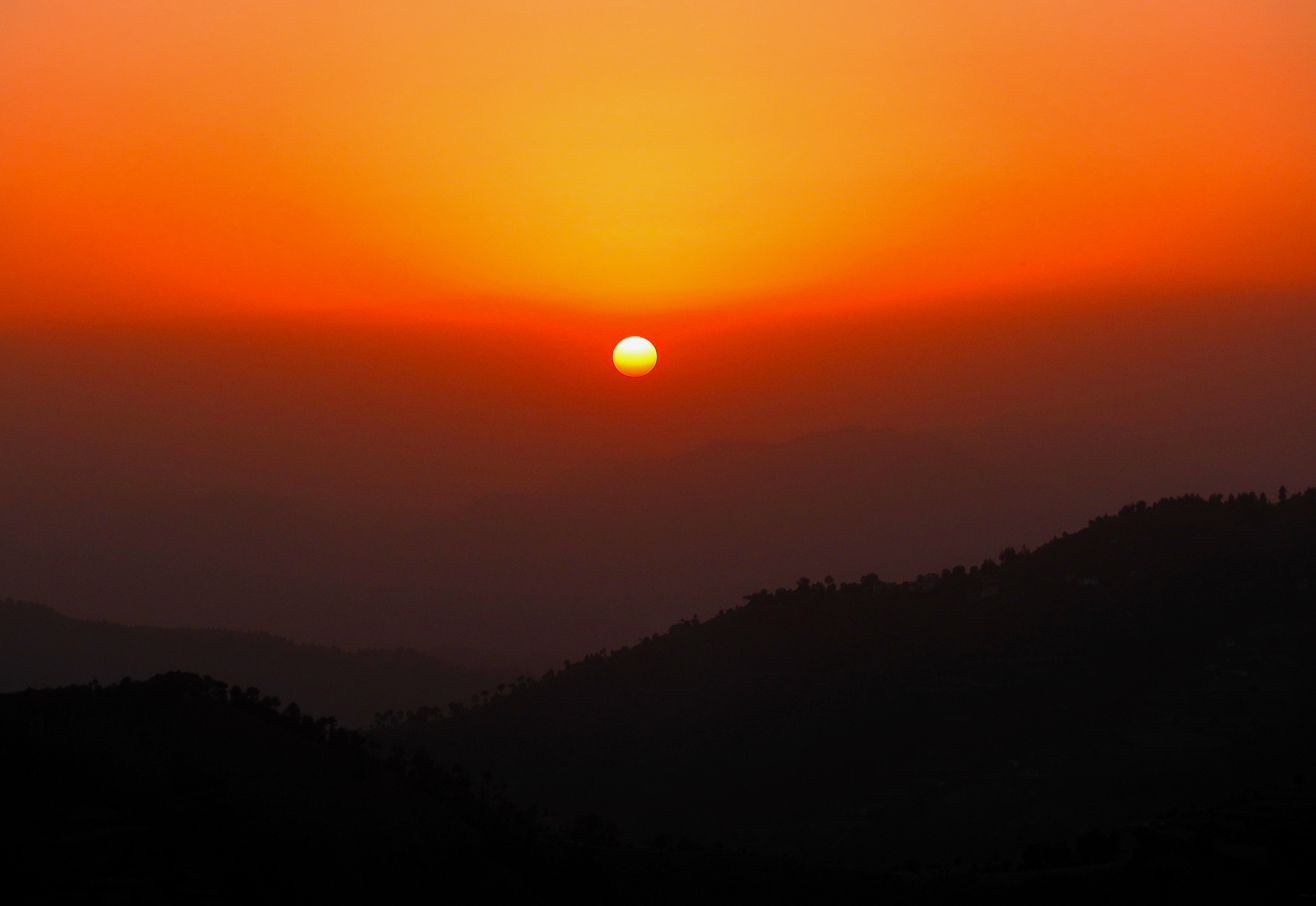
Winterline view from Kufri in Shimla

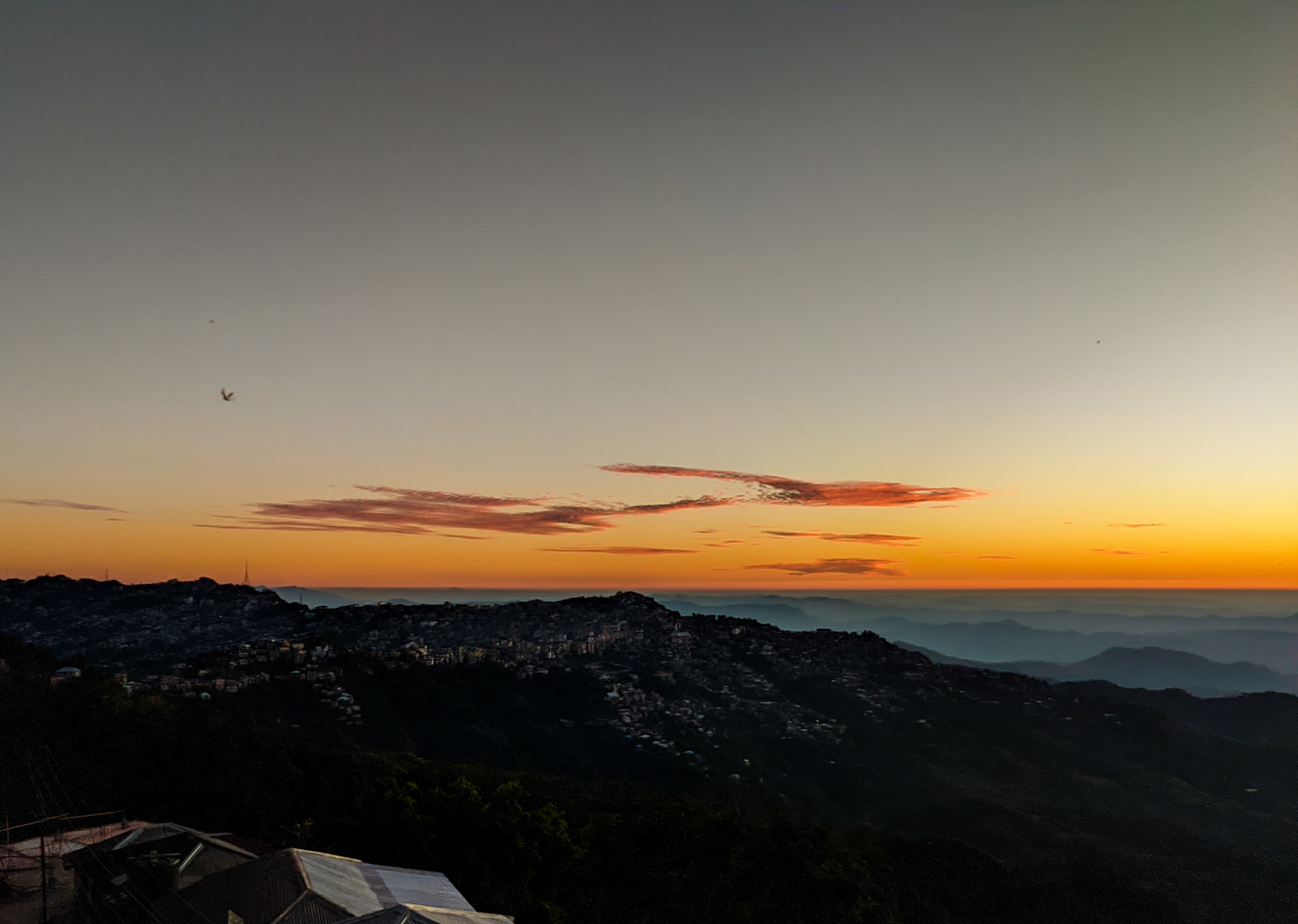
Winterline view with Lunglei in frame.

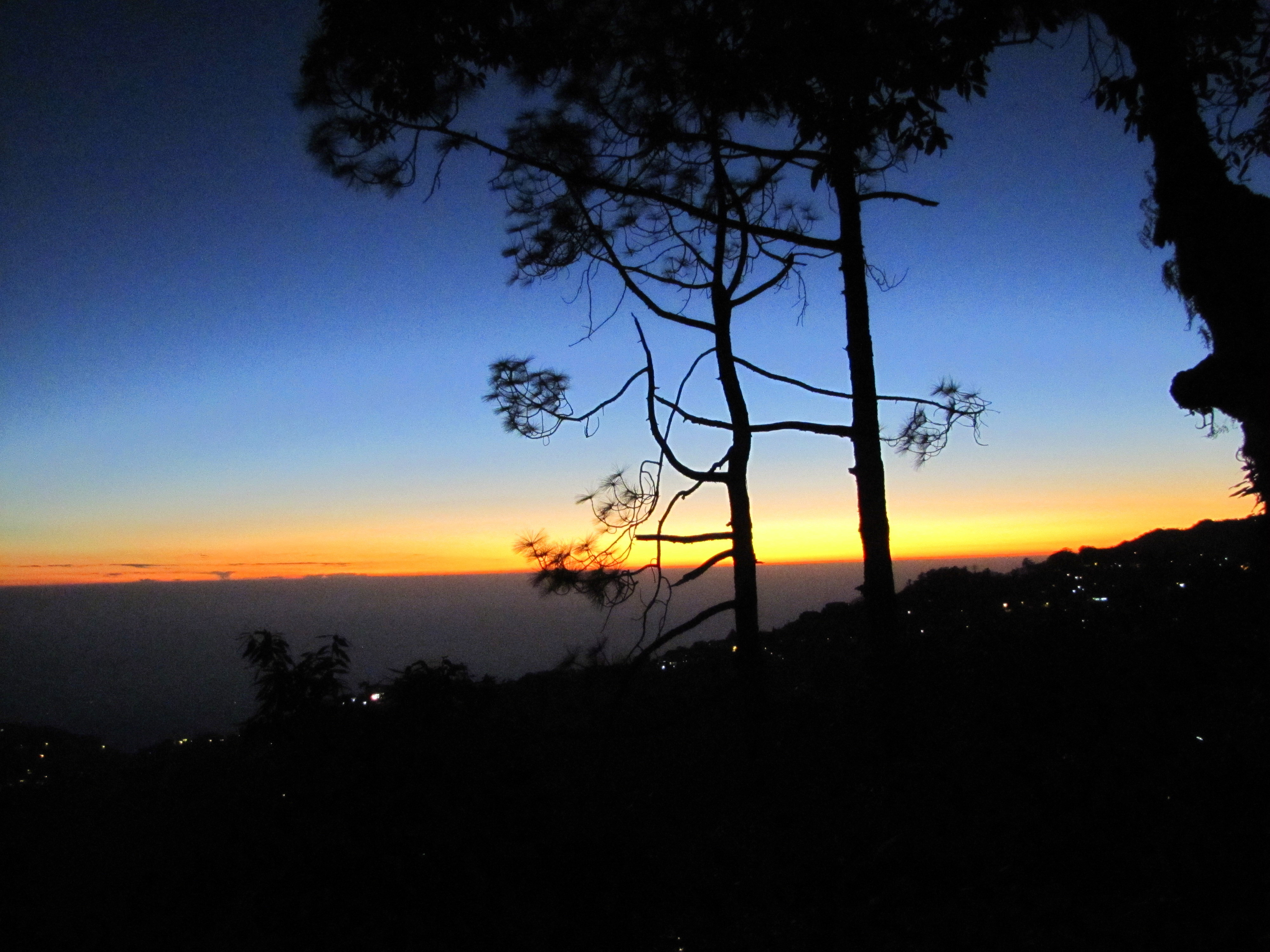
Winterline as visible from Mussoorie

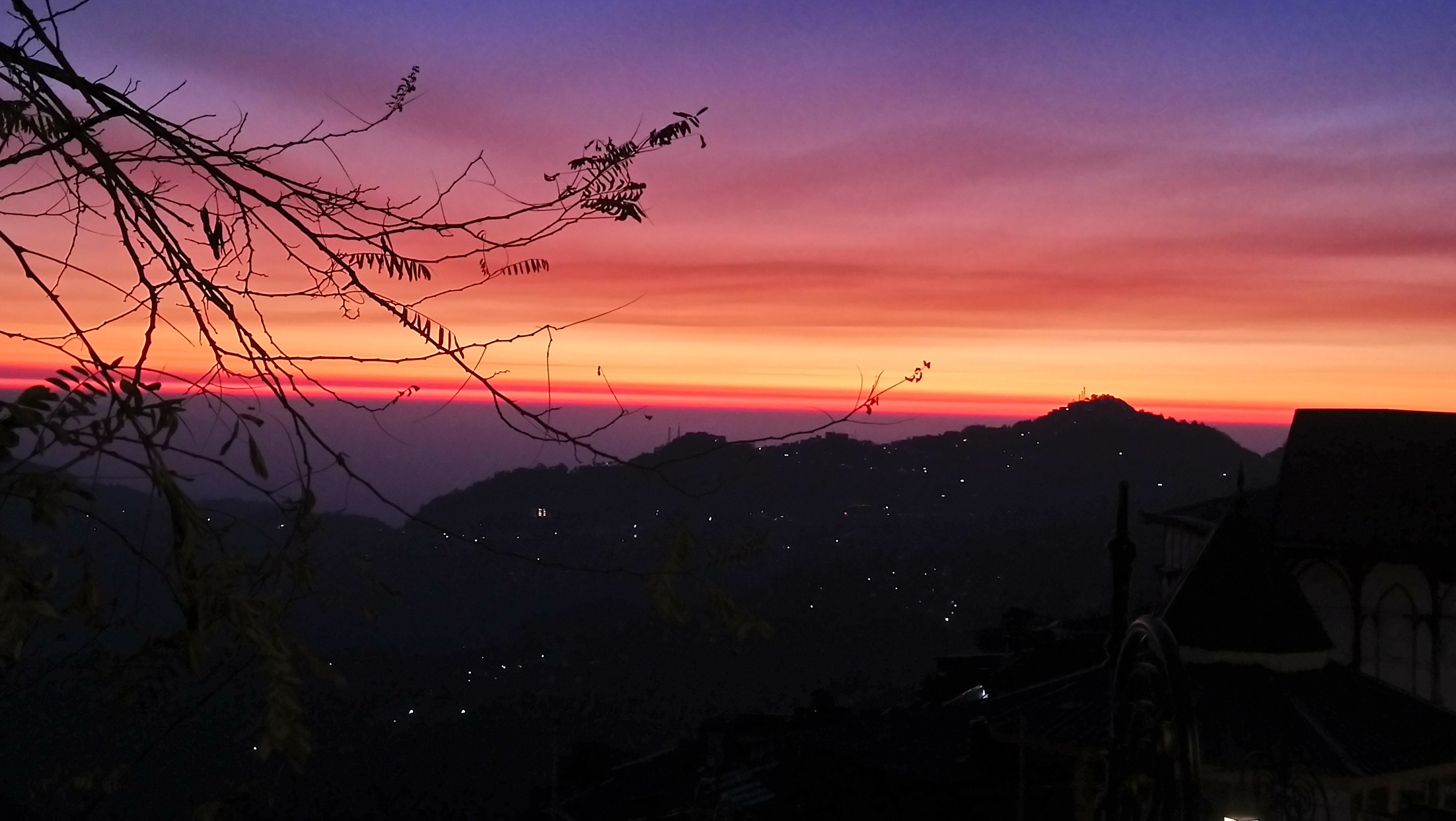
Winterline view from Shimla
