= Titron =

- Town
- Nickname: Triton
- Location in Uttar Pradesh, India Titron (India)
- Coordinates: 29.668°N 77.323°E
- Country: India
- State: Uttar Pradesh
- District: Saharanpur
- Established: Town Declared 1951
- Elevation: 267 m (876 ft)

Population (2011)
  - Total: 10,898

Languages
  - Official: Hindi, Urdu, English
- Time zone: UTC+5:30 (IST)
- Website: up.gov.in

Titron, also known as Durraj Pur, is a town and a nagar panchayat in Saharanpur district in the Indian state of Uttar Pradesh.

== Geography ==
It has an average elevation of 267 metres (954 feet).

== Fame ==
Due to fertile land Titron is famous for mango production. It consists of a large green belt under mango trees.

== Origin of Titron ==
There is no conformed History for Titron. But according to some resources the Qazi of the Mughal Emperor had a huge castle build and remains are still there .

Many Treasures have been found although not in perfect form.

== Demographics ==
As of 2011 India census, Titron had a population of 10898. Males constitute 52.13% of the population and females 47.86%. Titron has an average literacy rate of 67.69%, lower than the national average of 74.04%: male literacy is 77.14%, and female literacy is 57.41%. In Titron, 12% of the population is under 6 years of age. Most of the population is based in the agricultural industry. The telephone STD code for Titron is 01331 The Postal PIN for Titron is 247343.
