= Dehradun district =

- District
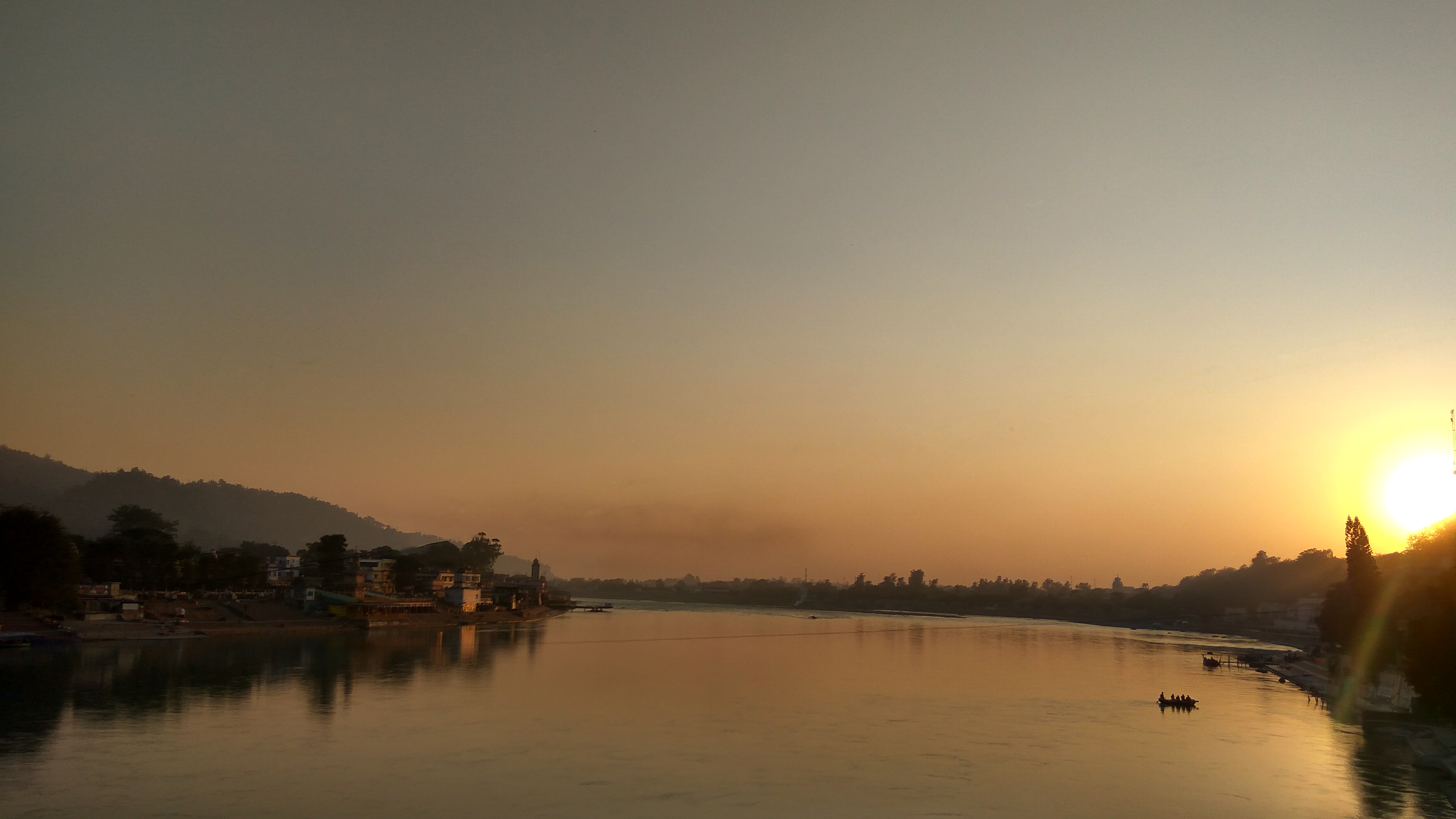
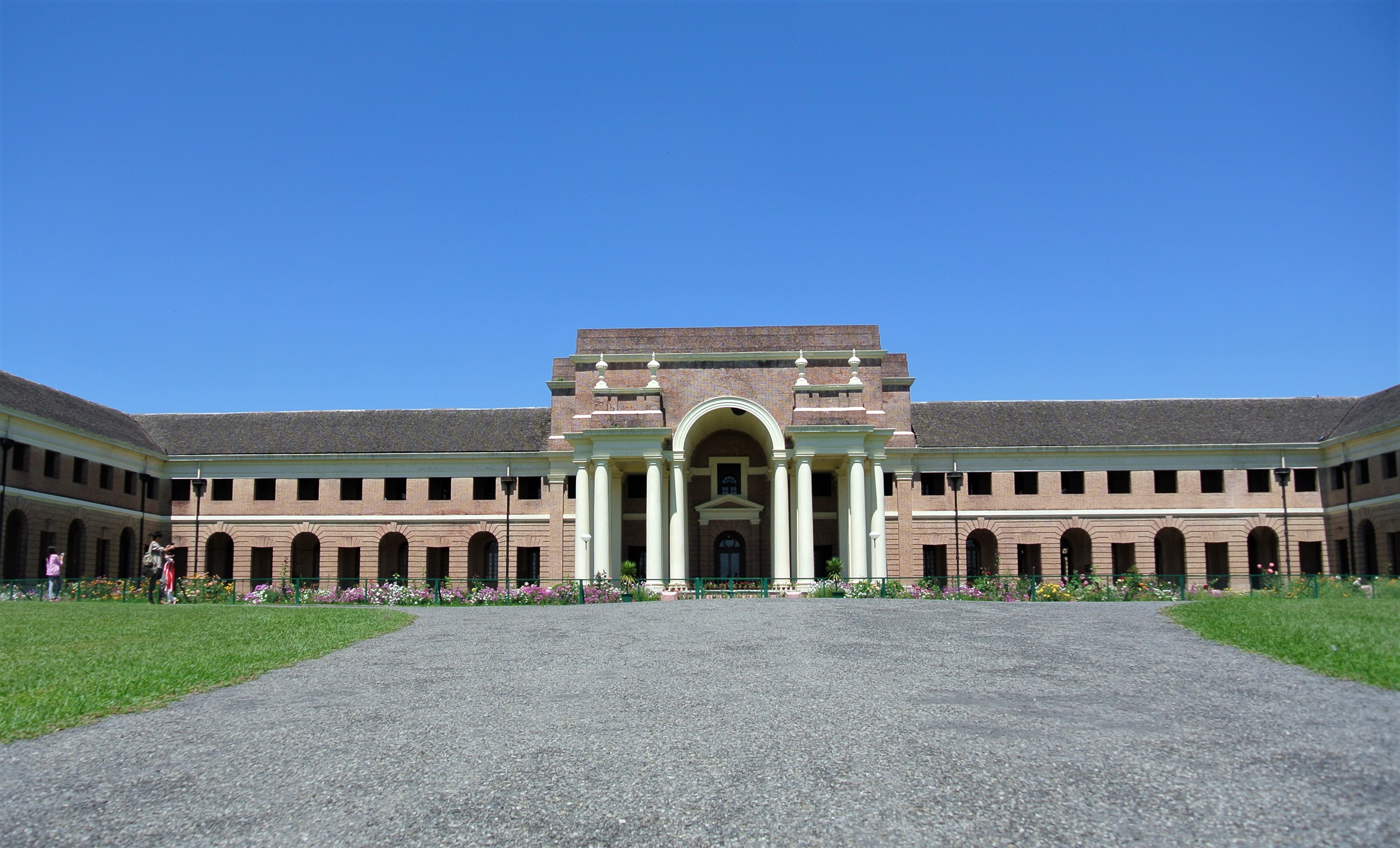
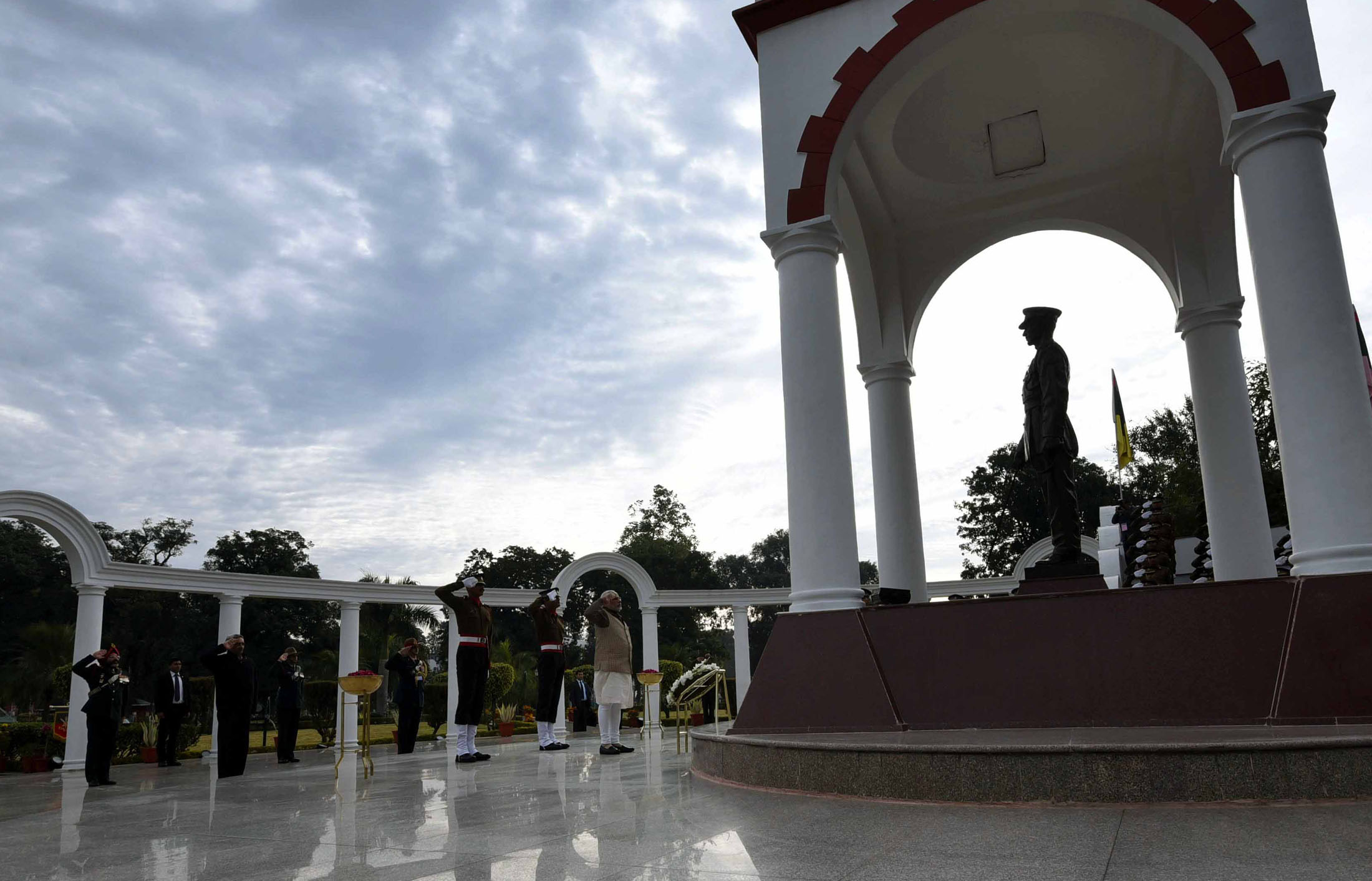
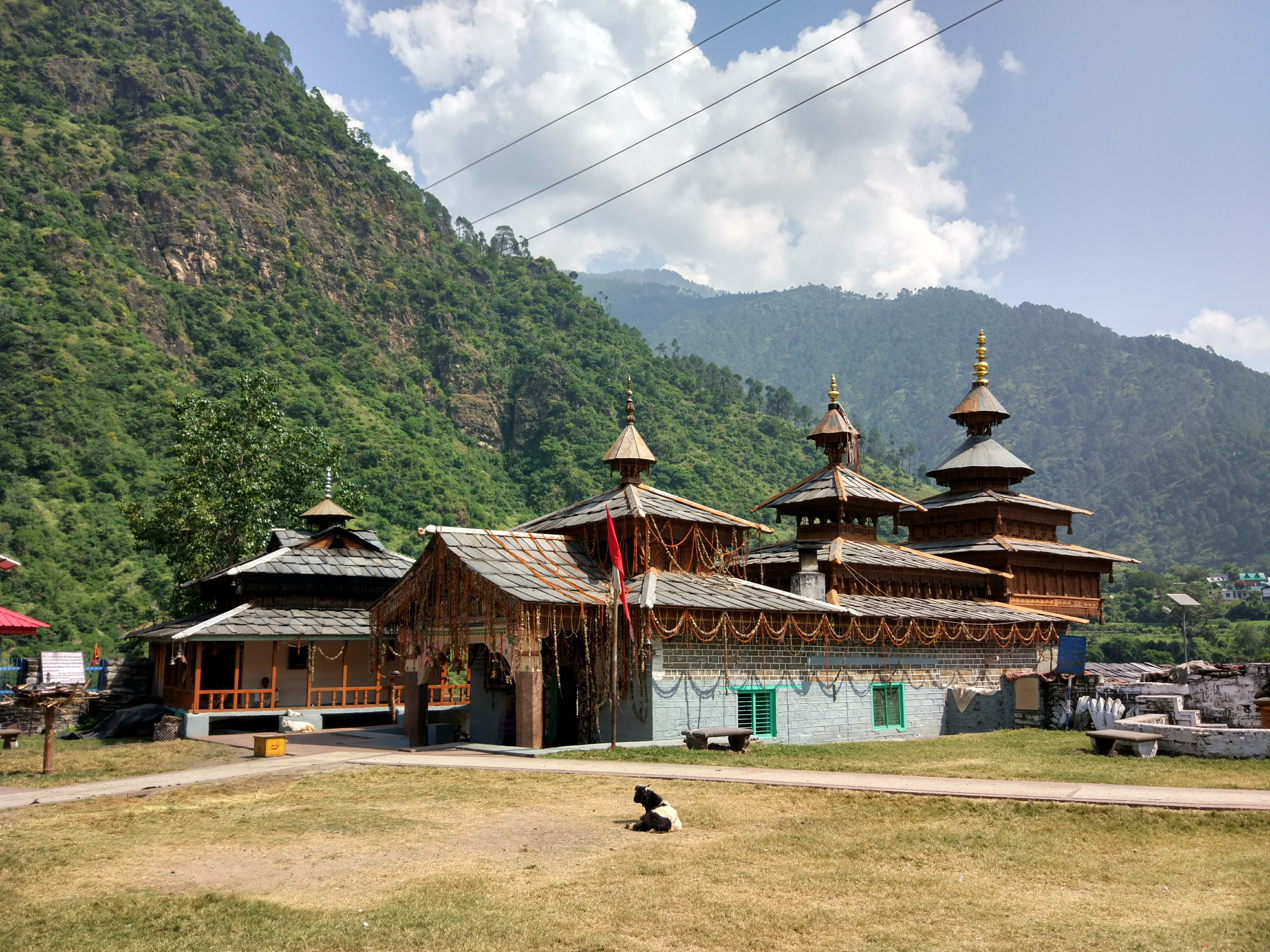
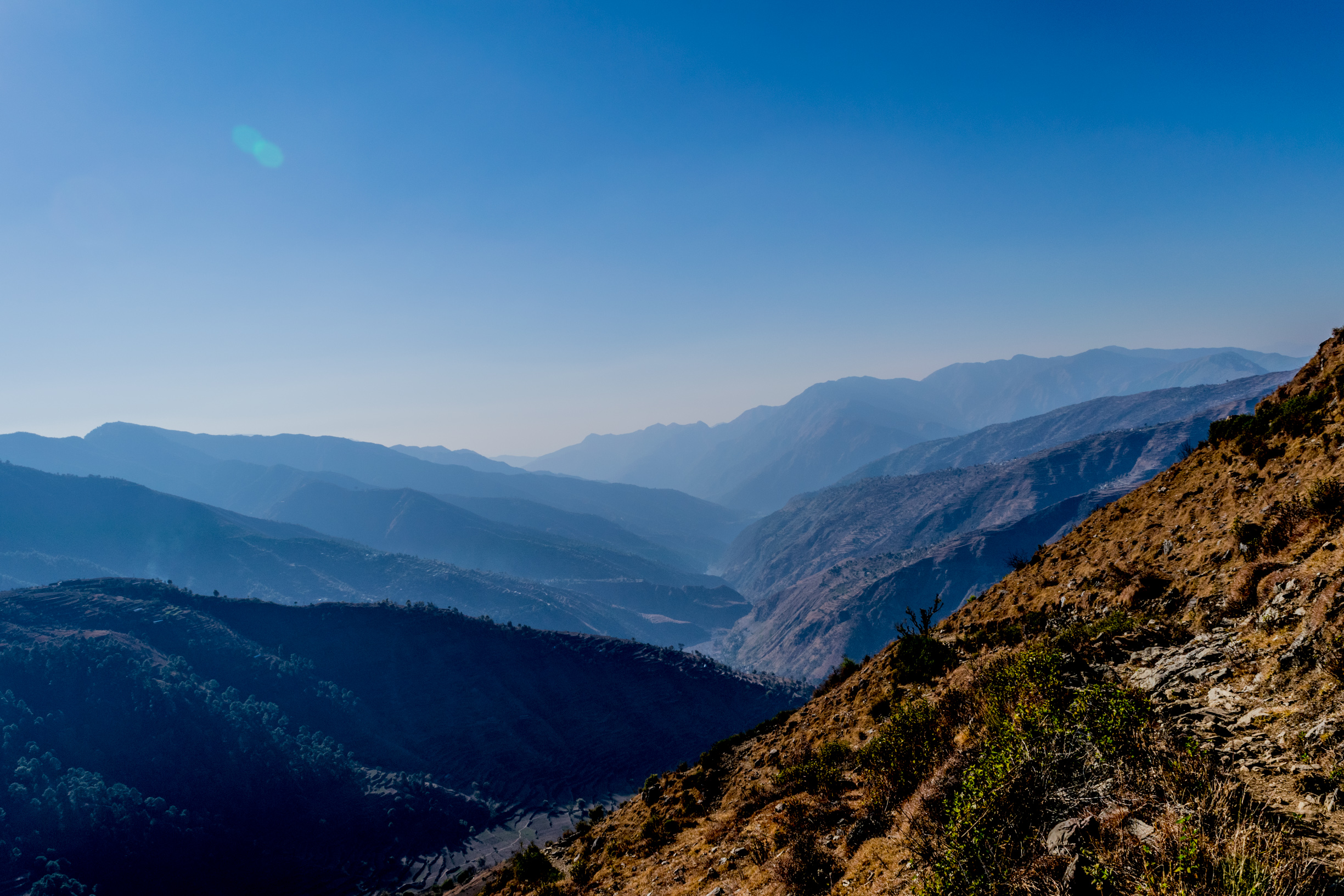
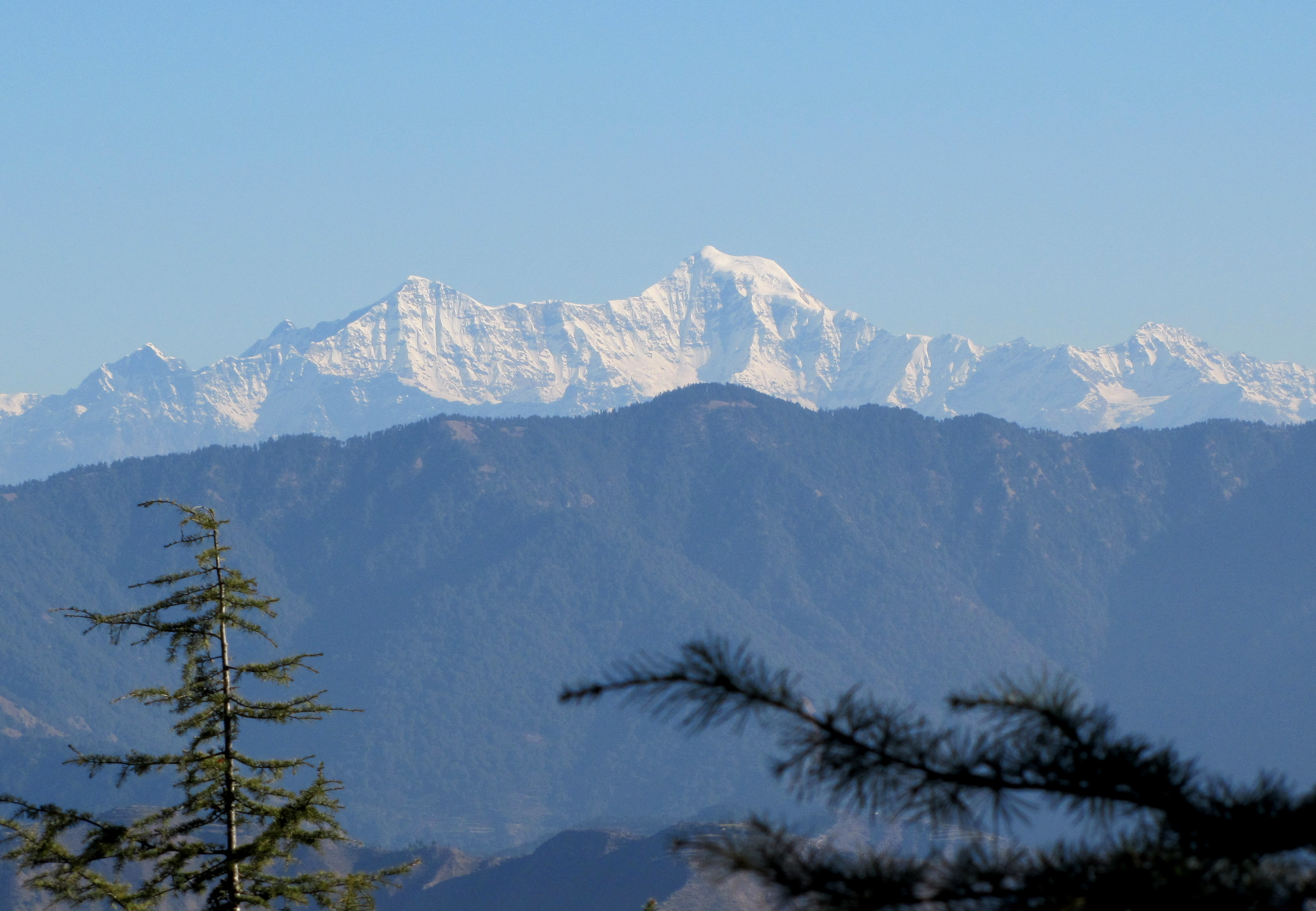
- Clockwise from top: Ganga in Rishikesh, War memorial in Indian Military Academy, Valley near Nag Tibba, Bandarpunch from Lal Tibba, Mahasu Devta Temple in Hanol, Forest Research Institute
- Interactive map of Dehradun district
- Coordinates: 30.38°N 77.97°E
- Country: India
- State: Uttarakhand
- Division: Garhwal
- Established: 11 July 1871
- Headquarters: Dehradun

Government
  - District Magistrate: Dr. R. Rajesh Kumar, IAS
  - SSP: Ajay Singh, IPS

Area
  - Total: 3,088 km^{2} (1,192 sq mi)

Population (2011)
  - Total: 1,696,694
  - Density: 549.4/km^{2} (1,423/sq mi)

Languages
  - Official: Hindi
  - Native: Jaunsari; Jaunpuri
- Time zone: UTC+5:30 (IST)
- Vehicle registration: UK 07
- Website: dehradun.nic.in

Dehradun district (Hindi: [d̪eːɦɾaːd̪uːn]) is a district in Garhwal division which is a part of Uttarakhand state in northern India. The district headquarters is Dehradun, which has also served as the winter capital of Uttarakhand. The district has 6 tehsils, 6 community development blocks, 17 towns, 764 inhabited villages, and 18 unpopulated villages. The district stretches from the Ganges river in the east to the Yamuna river in the west, and from the Terai and Shivaliks in the south and southeast to the Great Himalaya in the northwest. During the British Raj, the official name of the district was Dehra Dun. In 1842, Dun was attached to Saharanpur district and placed under an officer subordinate to the Collector of the district but since 1871 has been administered as a separate district.

Dehradun is located 230 km from the national capital, Delhi. The National Oil and Natural Gas Corporation, Survey of India, and many educational institutions like Doon University, Uttrakhand Technical Institute, Indian Institute of Petroleum, Uttaranchal University, Forest Research Institute, Wildlife Institute of India, Rashtriya Indian Military College and Indian Military Academy are situated here. Basmati rice, tea and litchi orchards are some of the major agricultural crops.

The British seized the region as a war spoil from the Maharaja of Tehri-Garhwal as a consequence of the Gurkha War of 1814–16, and attached it administratively to Saharanpur District to its immediate south, which was already in British hands.

== Timli State ==
Timli State was founded in the mid-16th century by Raja Phoda Singh Chokkar and Raja Lal Karan Singh Chokkar, members of the Gurjar Chokkar family of Hindus, the state remained under the rule of the Chokkar Dynasty until its eventual annexation. In 1548, two prominent Gurjar chieftains, Raja Phoda Singh Chokkar and Raja Lal Karan Chokkar, from the Titron region in Saharanpur district, crossed the Sivalik Hills, conquered the entire Dehradun area, and established the Timli state. They also founded a town named Timli. Rao BhagwanSingh Rahis was the majestic king of the Chhokar family of Timli. He had the status of a magistrate and he used to fix the prices of agricultural products of north india. When the British Raj entered this area under the Arazi-i-Bandobasti land settlement, they took control of the area around Dehradun, while the rest of the state remained under local rule. By 1830, Raja Bhagwan Singh was the king of Timli state. His only descendant, a daughter named Satyaditi, became the ruler after him. The Current Head of the family is Chaudhary Rao Dillip Singh .

Maharaja Ranjit Singh Khatana of Samthar state, was married at a young age to a princess from the Chhokar family, which ruled Timli state in Dehradun.

== Demographics ==
Historical population
Year	Pop.	±% p.a.
1901	177,465	—
1911	204,534	+1.43%
1921	211,877	+0.35%
1931	229,850	+0.82%
1941	265,786	+1.46%
1951	361,689	+3.13%
1961	429,014	+1.72%
1971	577,306	+3.01%
1981	761,668	+2.81%
1991	1,025,679	+3.02%
2001	1,282,143	+2.26%
2011	1,696,694	+2.84%

Religions in Dehradun district (2011)
Religion	Percent
Hinduism	83.98%
Islam	11.91%
Sikhism	2.15%
Christianity	0.79%
Buddhism	0.69%
Other or not stated	0.48%
Distribution of religions

As of the 2011 Census of India, Dehradun district has highest population (1,698,560) in Uttarakhand. The Decadal growth rate has jumped up from 25% (1991–2001) to 32.48% (2001–2011). This is the third highest in Uttarakhand after Haridwar (33.16%) and Udham Singh Nagar (33.40%). The district has a gender ratio of 902 as against a state average of 963. This has however improved from 887 in the 2001 census. The population density is 550, again the 3rd highest after Haridwar(817) and Udham Singh Nagar (648). The state average is 189. The literacy rate is the highest in the state at 85.24% (90.32 for males, 79.61 for females).

According to the 2011 census Dehradun district has a population of 1,698,560, roughly equal to the nation of Guinea-Bissau or the US state of Idaho. This gives it a ranking of 290th in India (out of a total of 640). The district has a population density of 550 inhabitants per square kilometre (1,400/sq mi). Its population growth rate over the decade 2001-2011 was 32.48%. Dehradun has a sex ratio of 902 females for every 1000 males, and a literacy rate of 85.24%. Scheduled Castes and Scheduled Tribes make up 13.48% and 6.57% of the population respectively.

Languages of Dehradun district (2011)
1. Hindi (59.8%)
2. Garhwali (16.8%)
3. Jaunsari (7.43%)
4. Urdu (3.82%)
5. Punjabi (3.36%)
6. Nepali (3.32%)
7. Kumaoni (1.10%)
8. Others (4.36%)

At the 2011 census, 60% of the district's population identified their first language as Hindi, 17% reported being speakers of Garhwali, 7.4% opted for Jaunsari, 3.8% chose Urdu, 3.4% – Punjabi, 3.3% – Nepali, 1.1% – Kumaoni, 0.87% – Bhojpuri, 0.58% – Tibetan, and 0.55% – Bengali.

Dehradun district: mother-tongue of population, according to the 2011 Indian Census.
Mother tongue code	Mother tongue	People	Percentage
002007	Bengali	9,258	0.5%
004001	Dogri	1,549	0.1%
005018	Gujarati	1,481	0.1%
006102	Bhojpuri	14,805	0.9%
006195	Garhwali	285,563	16.8%
006240	Hindi	1,014,363	59.8%
006265	Jaunsari	126,098	7.4%
006340	Kumauni	18,597	1.1%
006439	Pahari	5,199	0.3%
006489	Rajasthani	1,113	0.1%
010008	Maithili	1,804	0.1%
010011	Purbi Maithili	988	0.1%
011016	Malayalam	1,217	0.1%
013071	Marathi	2,747	0.2%
014011	Nepali	56,281	3.3%
015043	Odia	1,313	0.1%
016038	Punjabi	56,927	3.4%
020027	Tamil	1,062	0.1%
021046	Telugu	1,230	0.1%
022015	Urdu	64,762	3.8%
029002	Balti	1,168	0.1%
115008	Tibetan	9,892	0.6%
–	Others	19,277	1.1%
Total		1,696,694	100.0%

== Assembly constituencies ==
1. Chakrata
2. Vikasnagar
3. Sahaspur
4. Dharampur
5. Raipur
6. Rajpur Road
7. Dehradun Cantonment
8. Mussoorie
9. Doiwala
10. Rishikesh

== Climate ==
Dehradun

Climate chart (precipitation, max. and min. temperature)
J	F	M	A	M	J	J	A	S	O	N	D
47 19 5	55 22 9	52 26 13	21 32 17	54 35 20	230 34 22	631 30 22	627 30 22	261 30 20	32 28 13	11 24 10	3 21 6
- █ Average max. and min. temperatures in °C
- █ Precipitation totals in mm
- Source: Climate of Dehradun District
Imperial conversion
J	F	M	A	M	J	J	A	S	O	N	D
1.9 66 41	2.2 72 48	2 79 55	0.8 90 63	2.1 95 68	9.1 93 72	25 86 72	25 86 72	10 86 68	1.3 82 55	0.4 75 50	0.1 70 43
- █ Average max. and min. temperatures in °F
- █ Precipitation totals in inches

== Cities and Towns ==
=== Cities ===
1. Dehradun

2. Rishikesh

3. Vikasnagar

4. Mussoorie

=== Towns ===
1. Doiwala

2. Selakui

3. Chakrata

4. Herbertpur

5. Dakpathar

6. Sahaspur

7. Harrawala

== Culture ==
Dehradun district is a part of Garhwal division, but more than half of the district is culturally part of the Mahasu region which mainly includes Jaunsar-Bawar areas, therefore local culture has been dominant in the district. Apart from Jaunsari other languages that are spoken in the district are Jaunpuri (transitional dialect of Jaunsari and Garhwali) in Mussoorie, Landour and nearby areas and Khariboli (a dialect of Hindi or Hindustani) in plain parts of the district, which also includes the district headquarters.

== See also ==
- Jaunsar-Bawar
- Timli State
- Chakrata
- Rishikesh
