= Mahasu =

Mahasu may refer to:

- Shiva, a Hindu deity

== Geography ==
- Mahasu (region)
- Mahasu district, the old name of Shimla district and Solan district in Himachal Pradesh, India
- Mahasu Peak, the highest peak in Kufri, India

== Government ==
- Mahasu constituency seats in the Lok Sabha

== Language ==
- Mahasu Pahari, a dialect of the Himachali language

== Religion ==
- Mahasu Devta Temple, Uttarakhand, India

== See also ==
- Mahadev (disambiguation)
