= Mahasu (region) =

Geographical and cultural region in Northern India

Mahasu Mahasudesh Mahadesh
- Geographical region
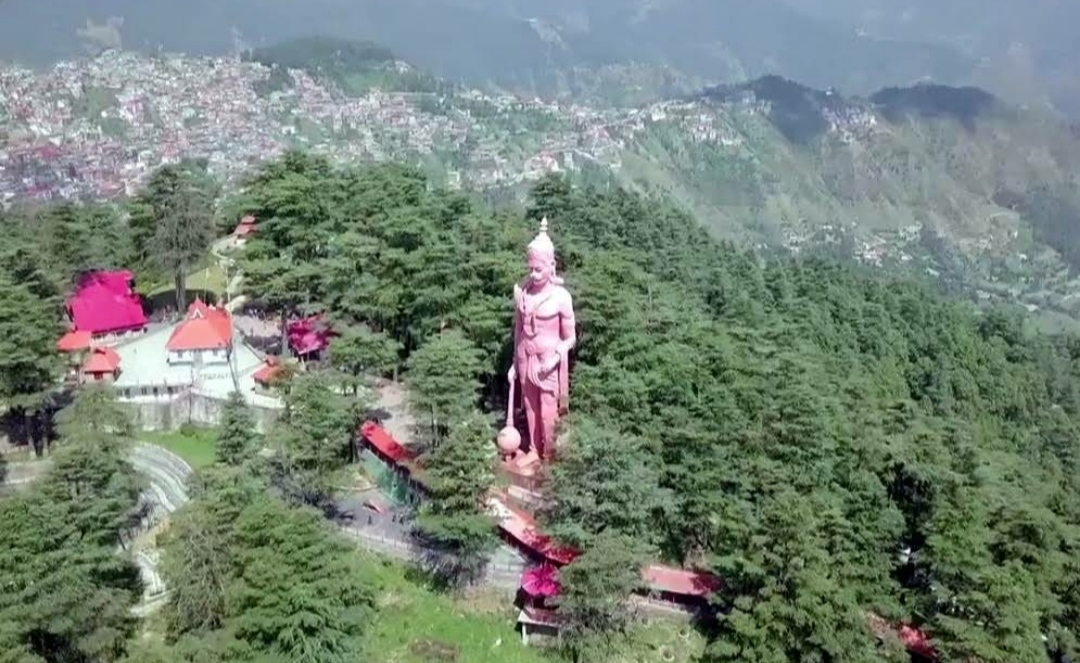
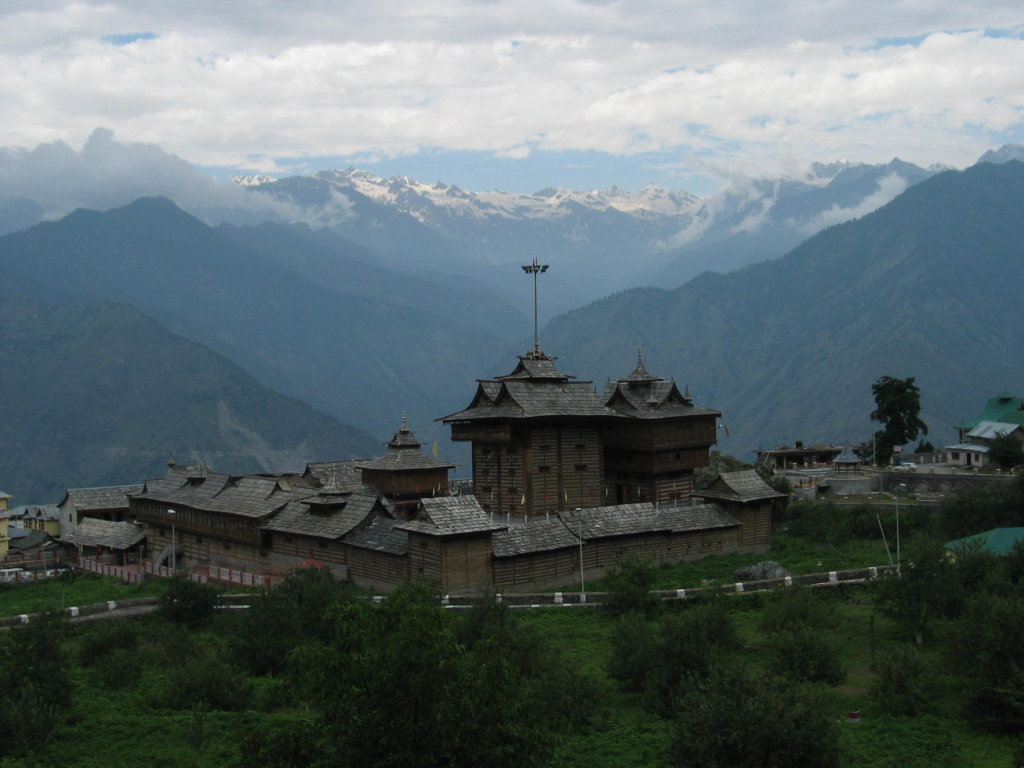
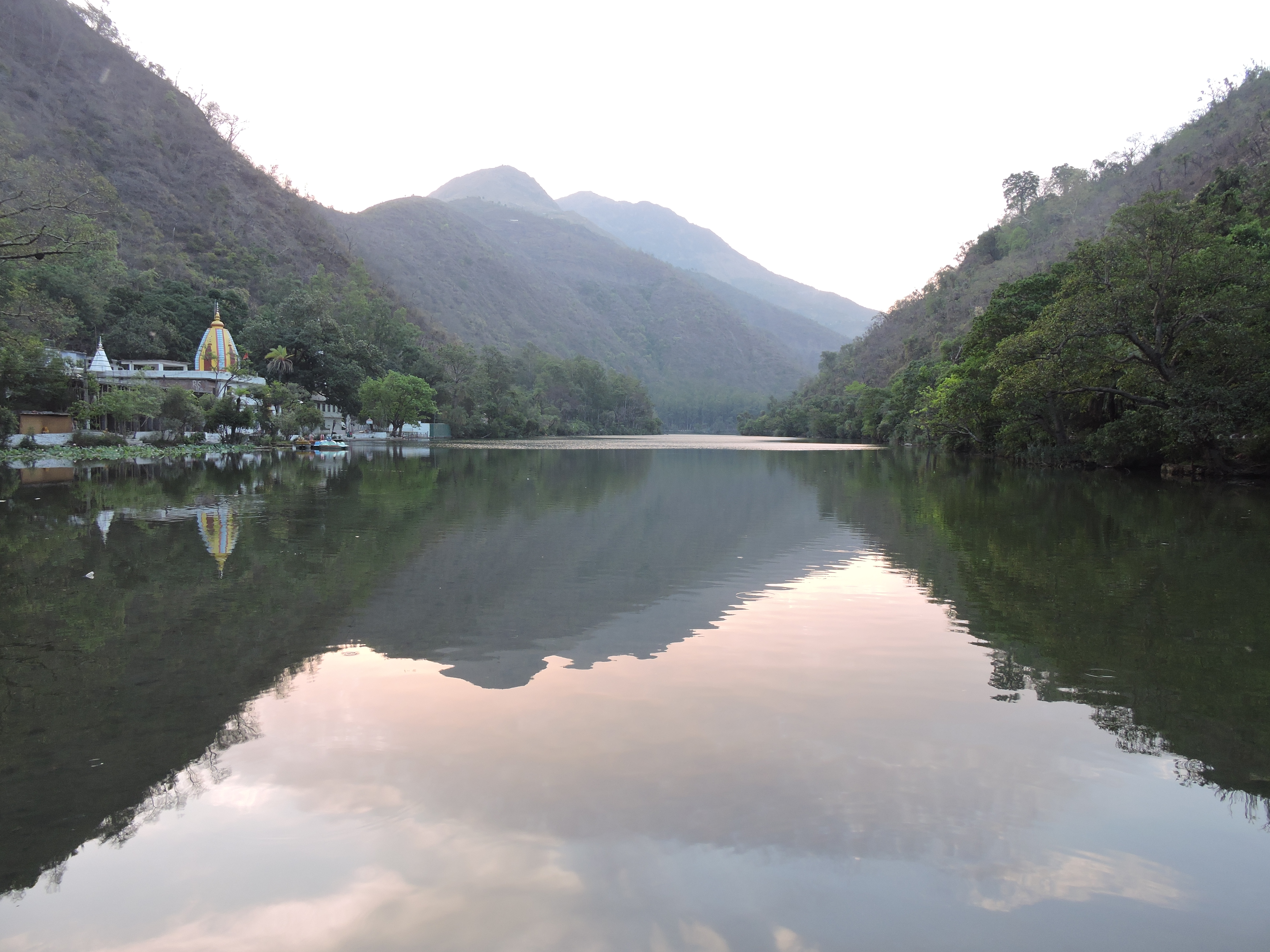
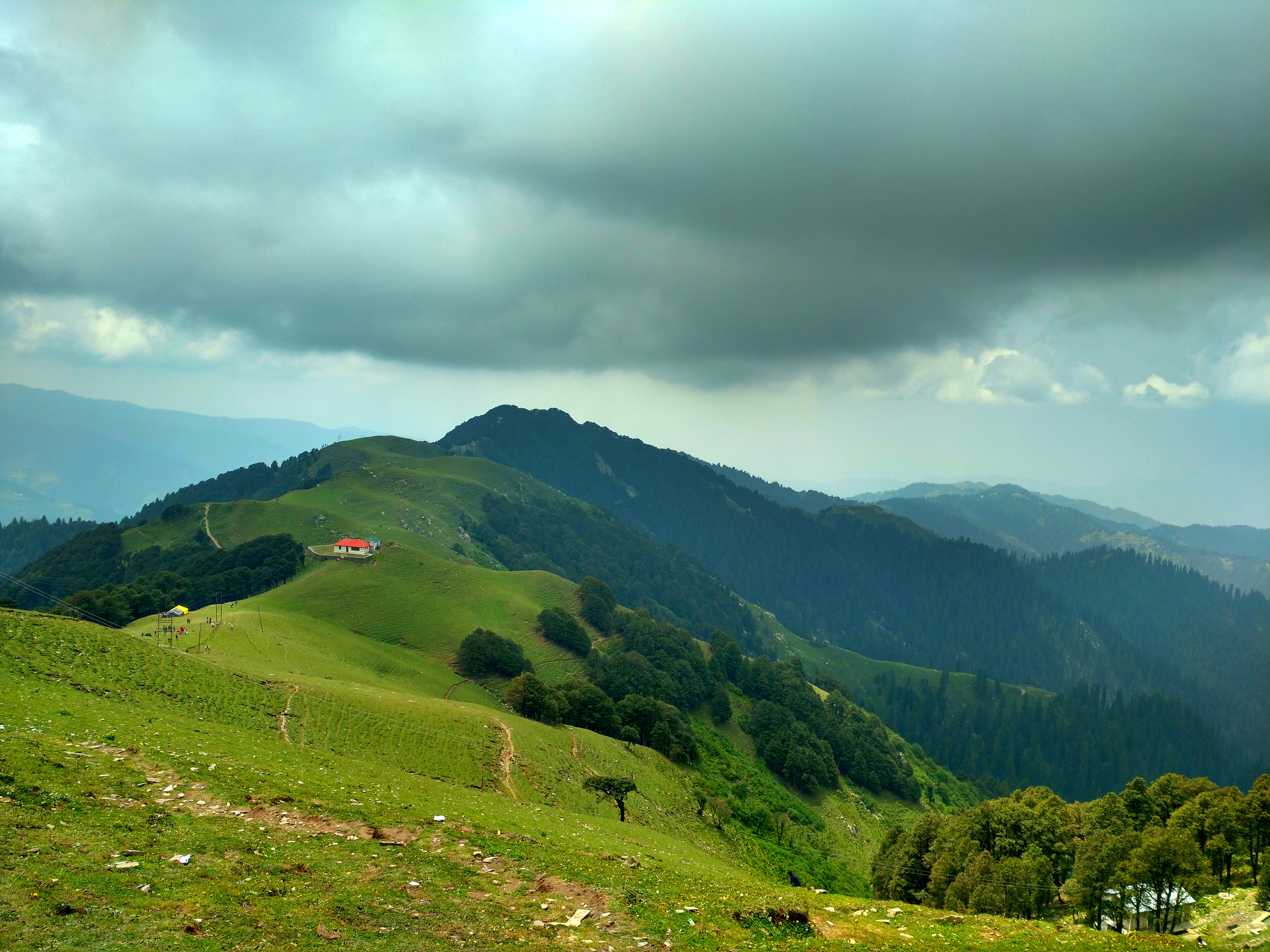
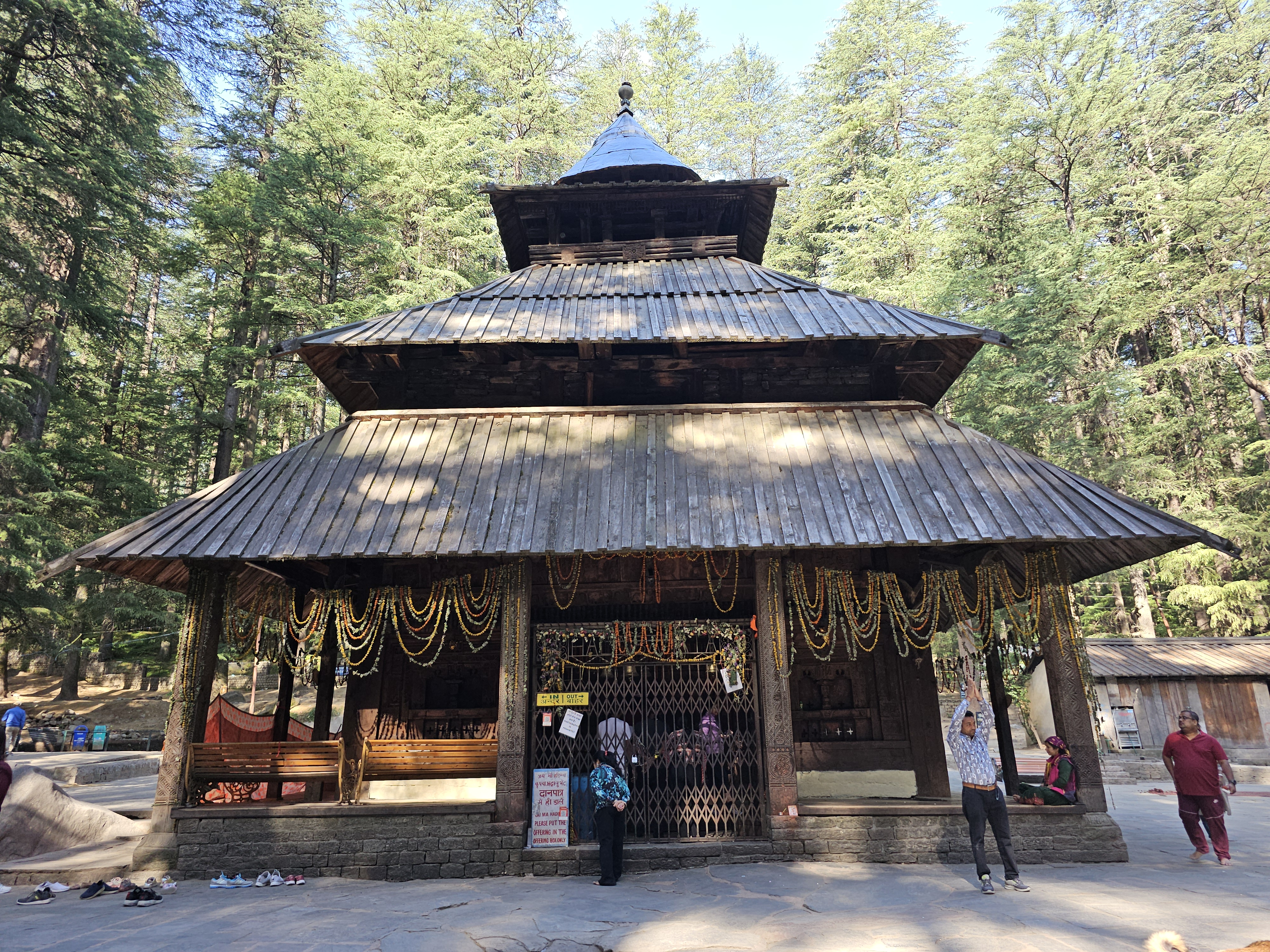
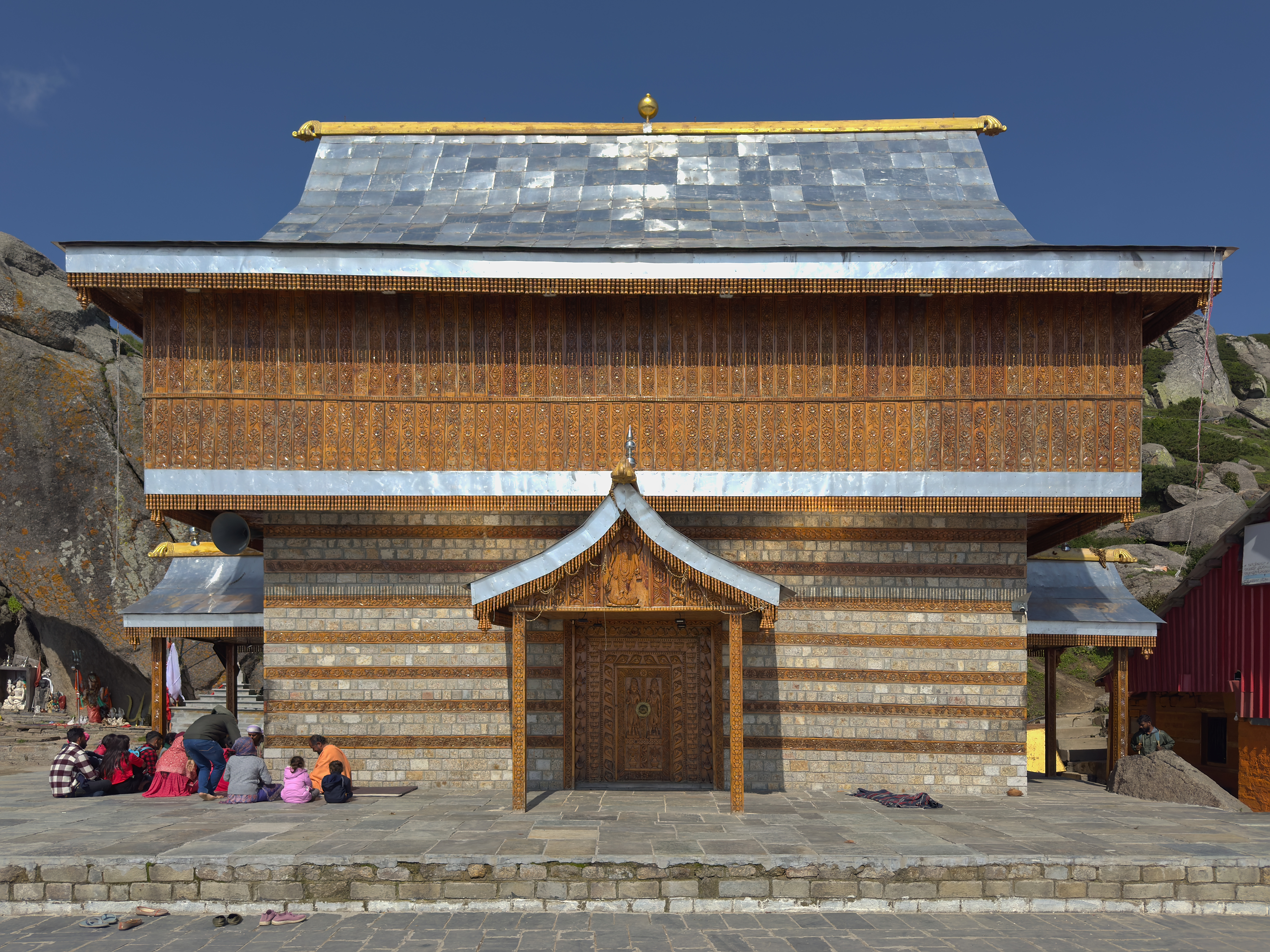
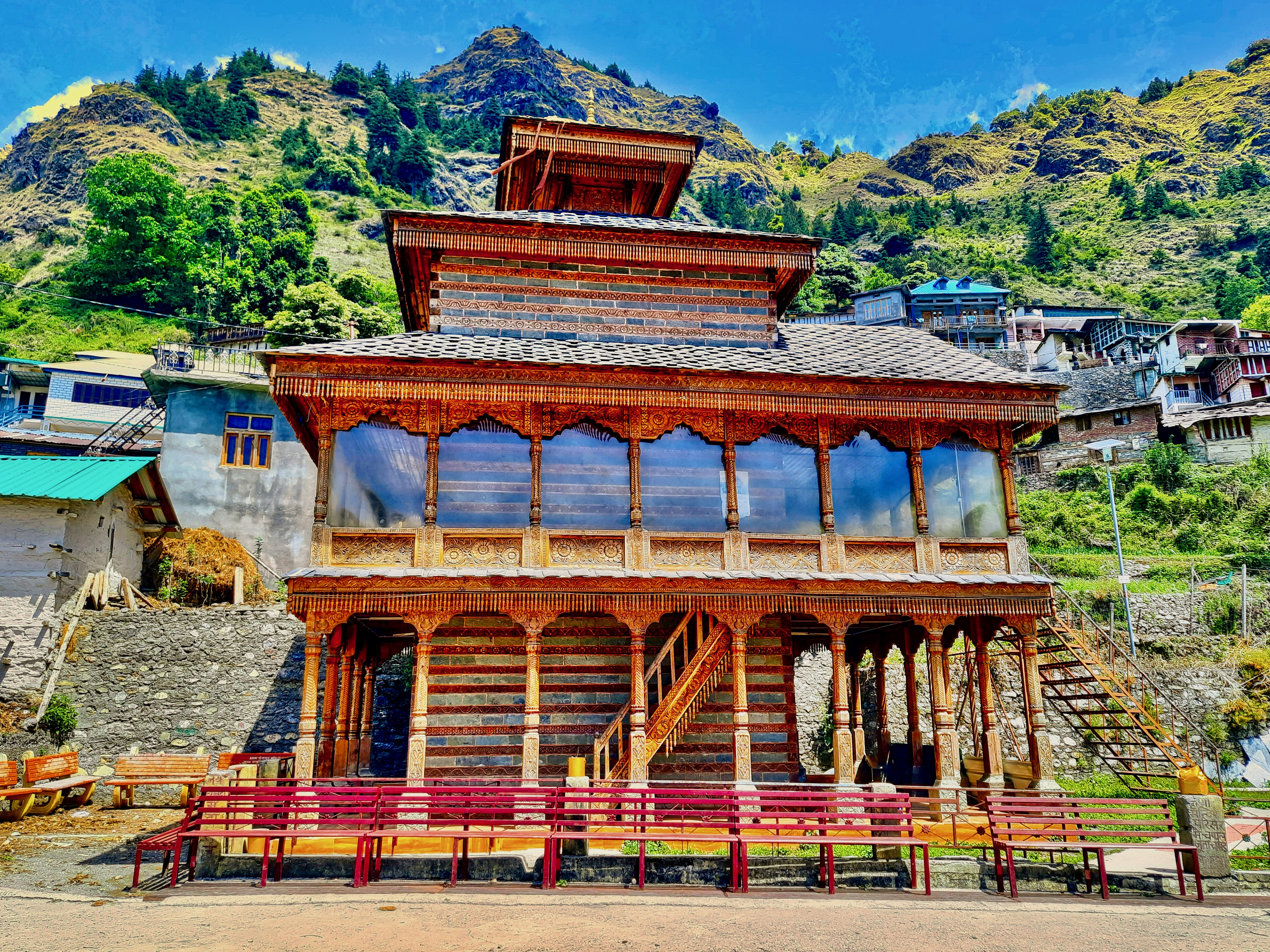
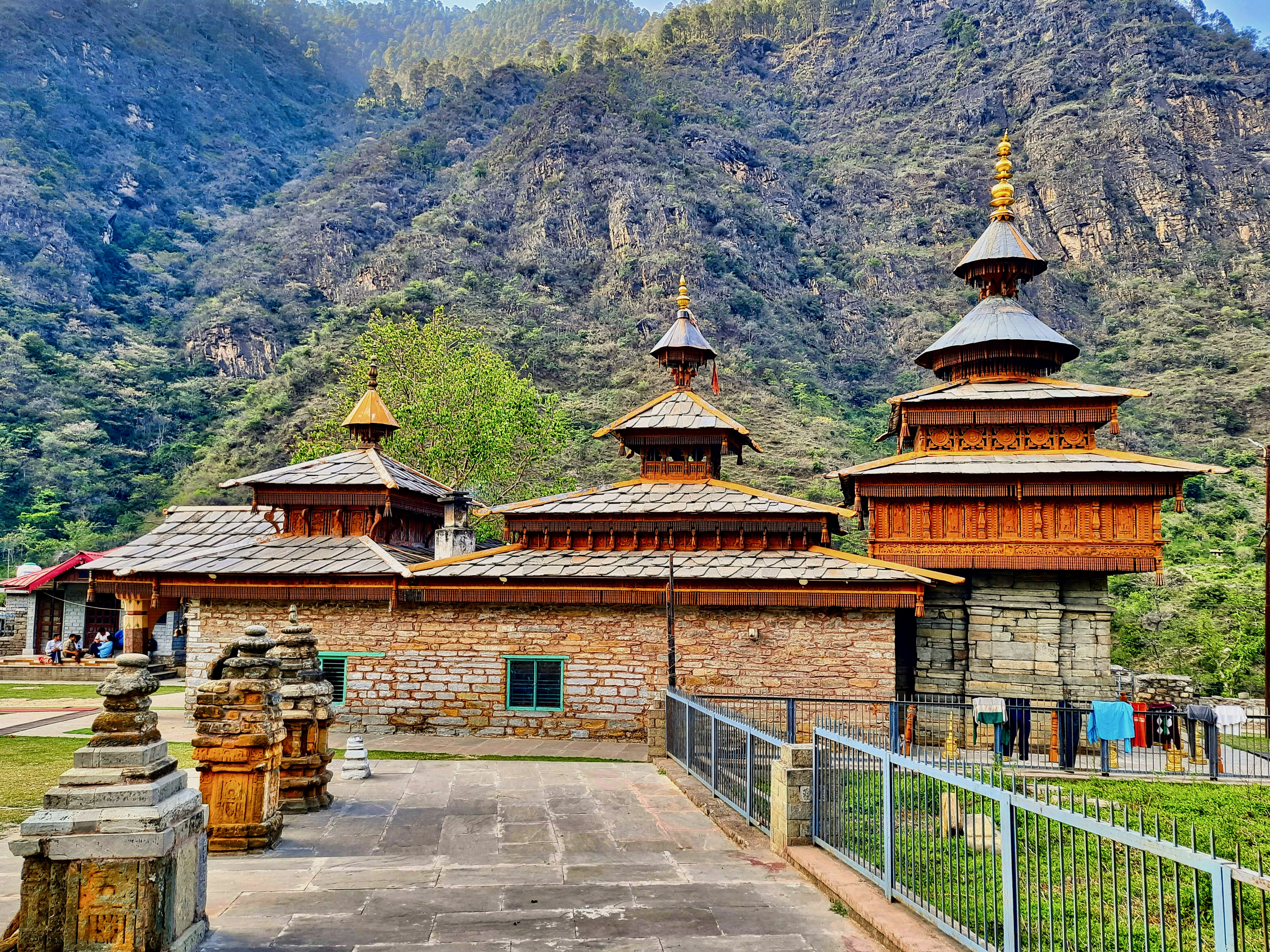
- Clockwise from top: Jakhu Mandir in Shimla, Renuka Ji Mandir and lake in Sirmaur, Hidimba Devi Mandir in Manali, Chalda Mahasu Mandir in Mohna village,Chakrata, Mahasu Devta Mandir in Jaunsar-Bawar, Shirgul Maharaj Mandir in Sirmaur, View from Shikari Devi Mandir in Mandi district, Bhimakali Mandir in Sarahan
- Nickname: Devbhoomi
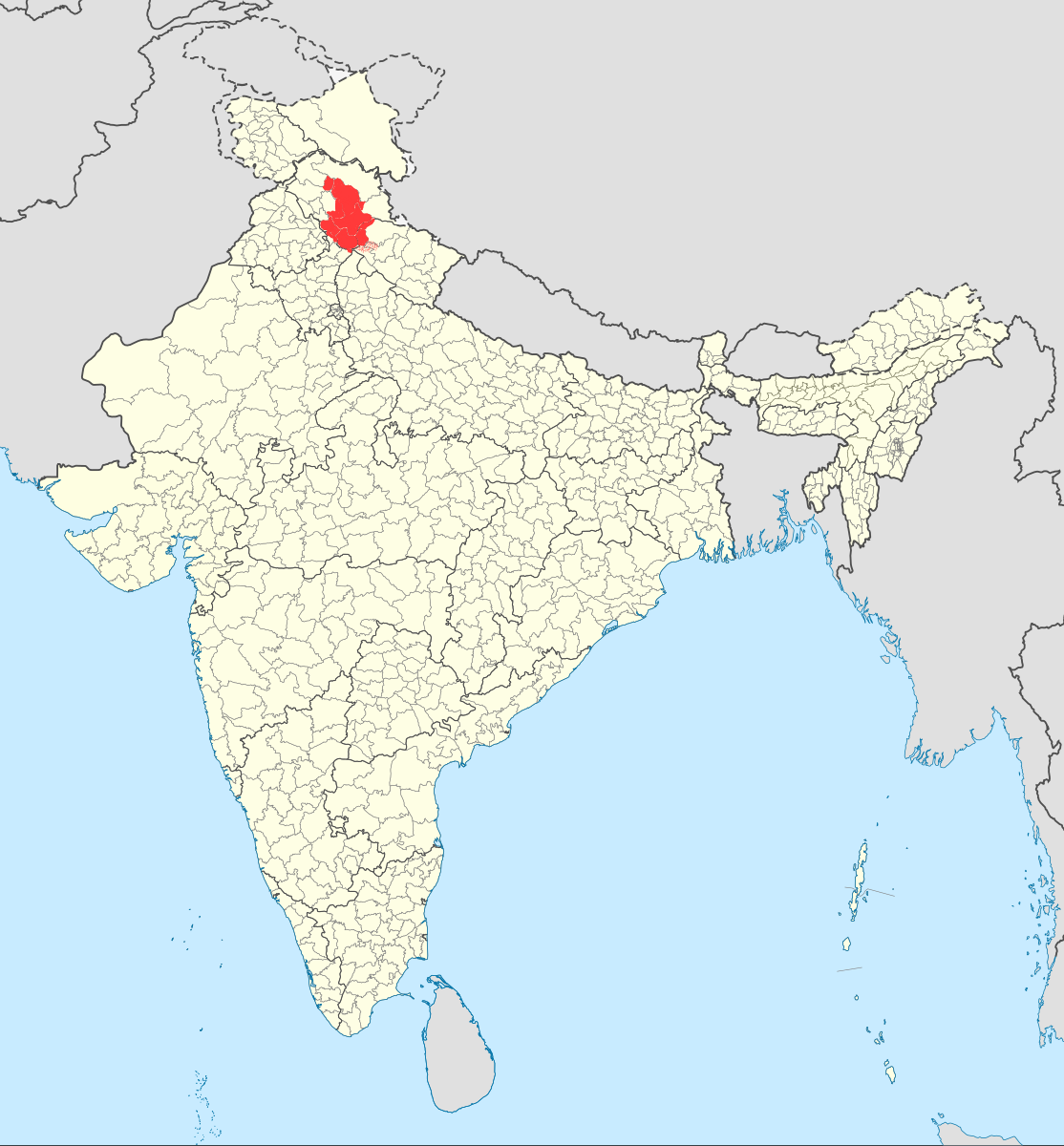
- Location in India
- Country: India
- States: Himachal Pradesh; Uttarakhand; Haryana
- District(s): Himachal Pradesh: Shimla; Solan; Kullu; Sirmaur; Southern and South-Eastern Mandi; South-Western parts of Kinnaur; Bara Bhangal of Kangra; Uttarakhand: Jaunsar-Bawar of Dehradun; Western parts of Uttarkashi; Haryana: Kalka, Pinjore and Morni Hills of Panchkula; Kalesar of Yamunanagar
- Largest city: Shimla

Area
  - Total: 20,867–21,983 km^{2} (8,057–8,488 sq mi)
- Demonym: Mahasui

Languages
  - Official: Hindi
  - Regional: Mahasu Pahari; Kullui; Sirmauri; Jaunsari; Pahari Kinnauri; and their dialects
  - Regional script: Takri; Pabuchi
- Time zone: Indian Standard Time

Mahasu also known as Mahasudesh or Mahadesh, is a term used to refer to the historical and cultural homeland of the Mahasui people primarily covering the upper part of the Northern Indian state of Himachal Pradesh, western parts of the state of Uttarakhand and hilly parts of the state of Haryana. In Himachal Pradesh it covers the districts of Shimla, Solan, Sirmaur, Kullu, upper parts of Mandi, some south-western parts of Kinnaur and Bara Bhangal area of Kangra, in Uttarakhand it covers Jaunsar-Bawar of Dehradun district and Bangan, Parvat, Rawain, etc. parts of Uttarkashi district and in Haryana it covers Kalka, Pinjore and Morni hills of Panchkula district and Kalesar of Yamunanagar district.

== Etymology ==
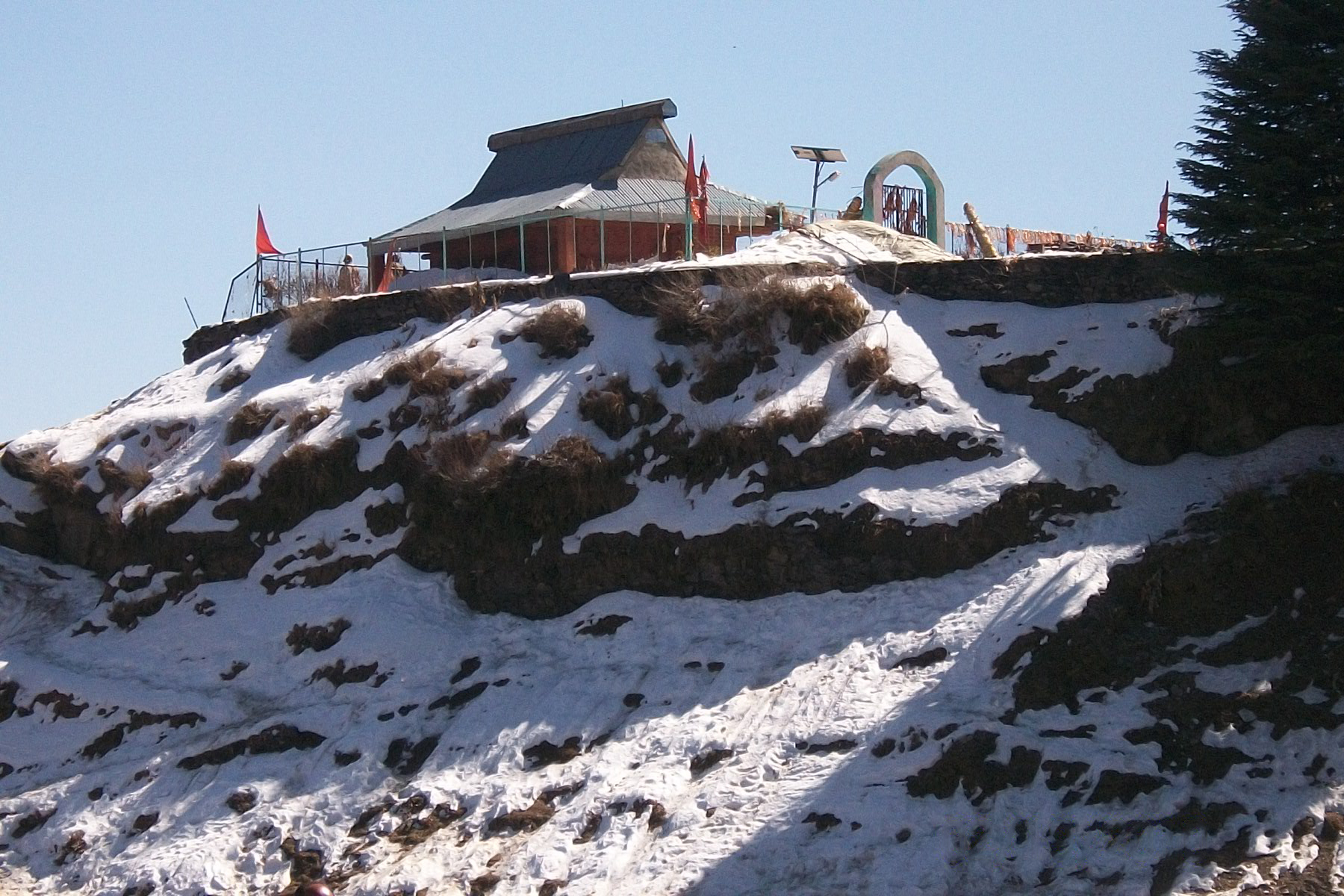
Mahasu Nag Devta Mandir atop of Mahasu peak, Kufri, Shimla

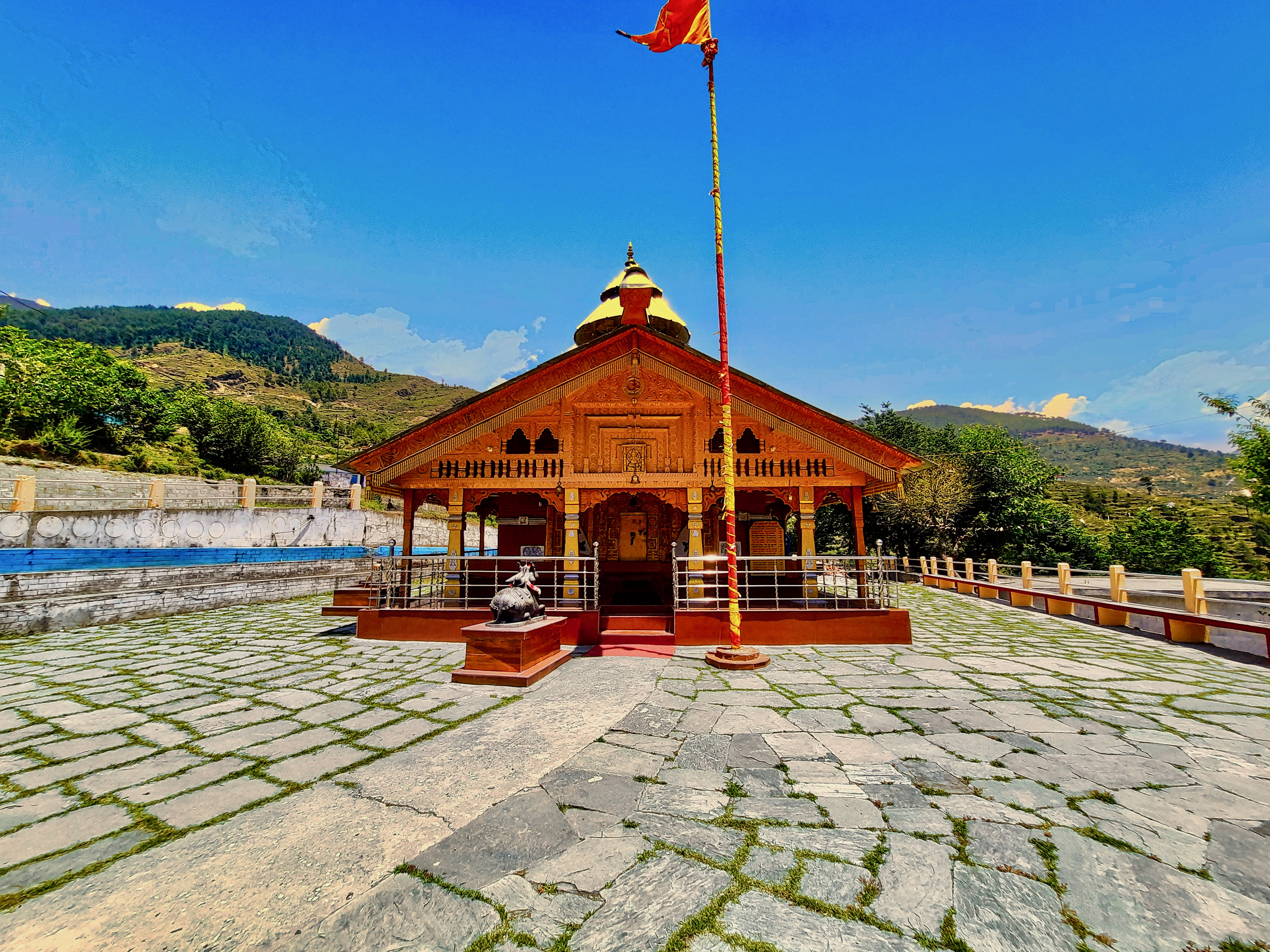
Mahasu Devta Mandir in Pujeli Banal, Uttarkashi district

Mahasu region got its name from Mahasu Devta (believed to be a form of Lord Shiva). As the cultural region as well as the language of half of the region (Mahasu Pahari) have got its name from Mahasu Devta, but in whole of the region, many other sub-groups also worship other deities and their own family deities (Kul-Devtas) apart from Mahasu Devta. As many sources said that Mahasu Devta (four brothers) had born in different places of the region like in Hanol in Jaunsar, another legend says Mahasu Peak in Kufri in Shimla, one legend says in Sirmaur district. As Mahasu Devta and many forms of different other Devis and Devtas such as Naag Devta and Shirgul Maharaj, etc. are worshipped in the region that is why the region is also known as "Devbhoomi".

== History ==
=== Early and ancient period ===
The Mahasu region forms a part of Western Himalayan cultural belt which is inhabited since prehistoric times by agrarian communities which were adapted to cold and mountainous terrain. Archaeological and folkloric evidences tells the continuity of settlements were based on terrace farming, seasonal migration and social organisation. Since early historic times the region laid on the Shaivite traditions, local deities traditions and Hindu belief. The area did not had a single kingdom but consisted of various small hill chiefdoms.

=== Early medieval period (7th-13th centuries) ===
During this era the Mahasu region remained politically fragmented. The local rulers used to govern small territories which often has forts, temples or river valleys. The region from the early times till even today (in some villages) governed by the local deities for justice delivery, even king's order at that time was not supreme but the Devta's orders were. It is believed that during this era Mahasu Devta cult gained prominence perhaps. The deity emerged as one of the supreme Lords of the region across multiple valleys and rivers.

=== Late medieval period and hill states ===
- Beja
- Baghal
- Baghat
- Bhajji
- Bushahr
- Darkoti
- Dhami
- Theog
- Jubbal
- Mangal
- Keonthal
- Sirmaur (Jaunsar was part of it)

These states were politically divided and independent but culturally they were interconnected. They shared language, religious practices and Devtas' authority even above kings and rulers of these states.

=== British colonial period ===
After the Anglo-Gurkha War (1814–1816), many parts of the region came under the control of Britishers. They overtook many kingdoms. They did not abolished the hill states but reorganised through indirect rule, they made the Punjab Hill States and Simla Hill States which also included areas of Mahasu region. Britishers gave the idea of Mahasu district at that time which they named after the primary deity and language of the region.

=== Post-independence reorganisation ===
After Indian independence in 1947, princely states of the region were merged into the Indian Union like other states of India. In 1948 Mahasu district was officially formed (which included today's Shimla, Solan and Kinnaur districts) after the 1948 integration of various Simla Hill States. On 1 May 1960, Kinnaur district was carved out from Mahasu's Chini tehsil and parts of Rampur. On 1 September 1972, Mahasu district was reorganised and dissolved, with its areas forming the new Shimla and Solan districts as today.

== Geography ==
=== Expansion ===
The Mahasu region today is divided into three states, its main region lies in Himachal Pradesh, western parts of Uttarakhand and some parts of Northern Haryana. In Himachal Pradesh the region lies in the following districts: Shimla, Solan, Sirmaur, Kullu, southern and south-eastern parts of Mandi, Bara Bhangal area of Kangra and some parts of south-western Kinnaur district. In Uttarakhand's three districts have the region's parts, these are Uttarkashi's western region of Bangan, Parvat and Ravain (transitional zone), etc. areas and Dehradun district's Jaunsar-Bawar area. In Tehri Garhwal district's Jaunpur block, adjoining Jaunsar-Bawar is a transitional zone, as Mahasu and Garhwal regions intermingle here, which also includes upper parts of Mussoorie and Landour. In Haryana, Mahasu region includes Panchkula district's Kalka, Pinjore and Morni Hills, and in Yamunanagar district it includes Kalesar hill regions which also is home to Kalesar National Park.

=== Rivers ===
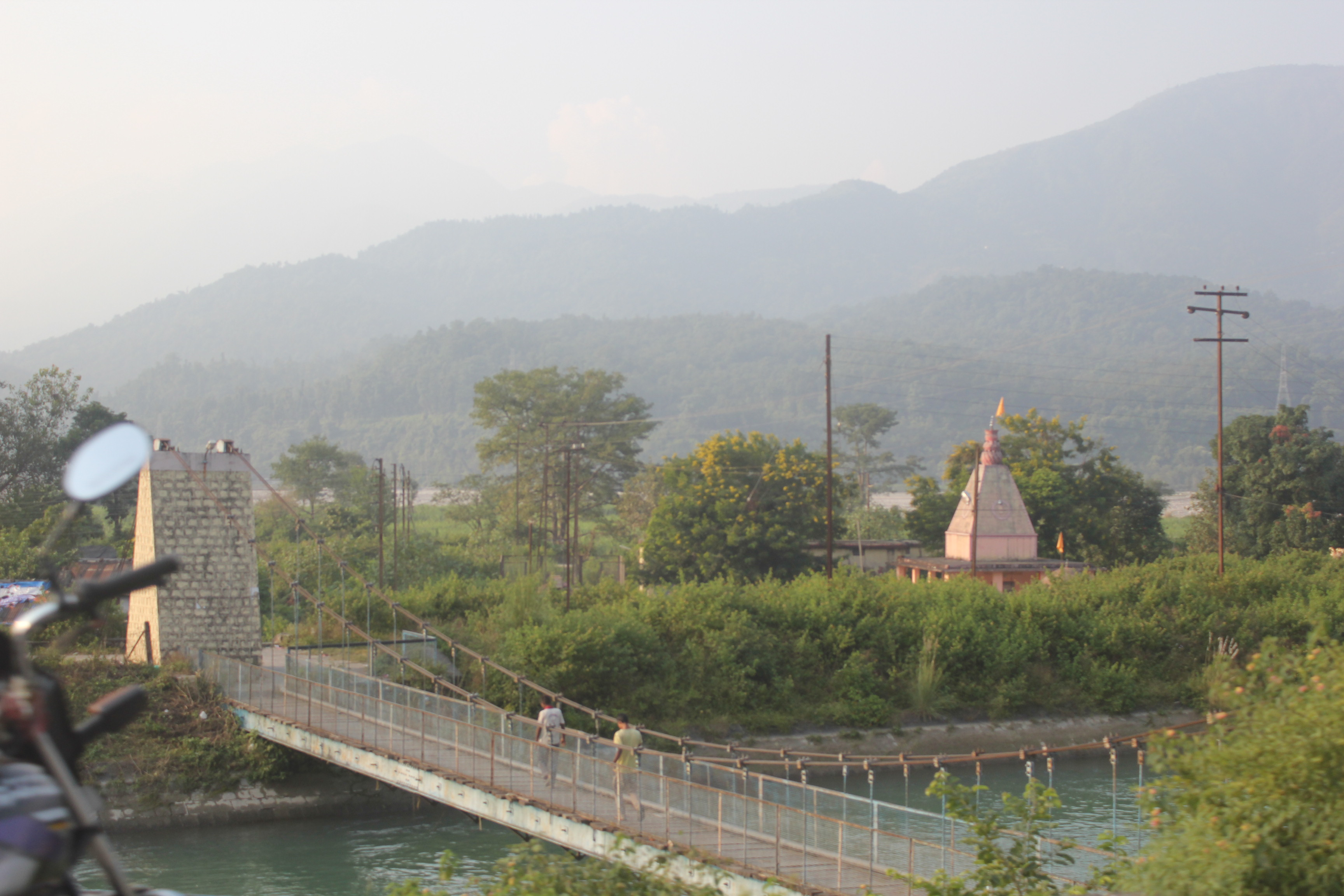
Yamuna river in Dakpathar, a town in Mahasu region

The Mahasu region has four major rivers which flows through it, these are Yamuna, Satluj, Beas and Ravi (originates from Bara Banghal), and these are very important to the people of the region culturally and religiously as well as for their livelihood. Major tributaries of Yamuna which also play important role in the lives of the people of the region. Notable tributaries of Yamuna river in the region are, Pabbar which divides Himachal's Rohru and Uttarakhand's Jaunsar, Giri river which divides the Sirmaur district into two parts Giriwaar (Dharti) and Giripaar, Tons river which separates Sirmaur district and Jaunsar-Bawar. Other major tributaries are also there of Satluj and Beas which are also very important to the people of the region.

=== Peaks ===
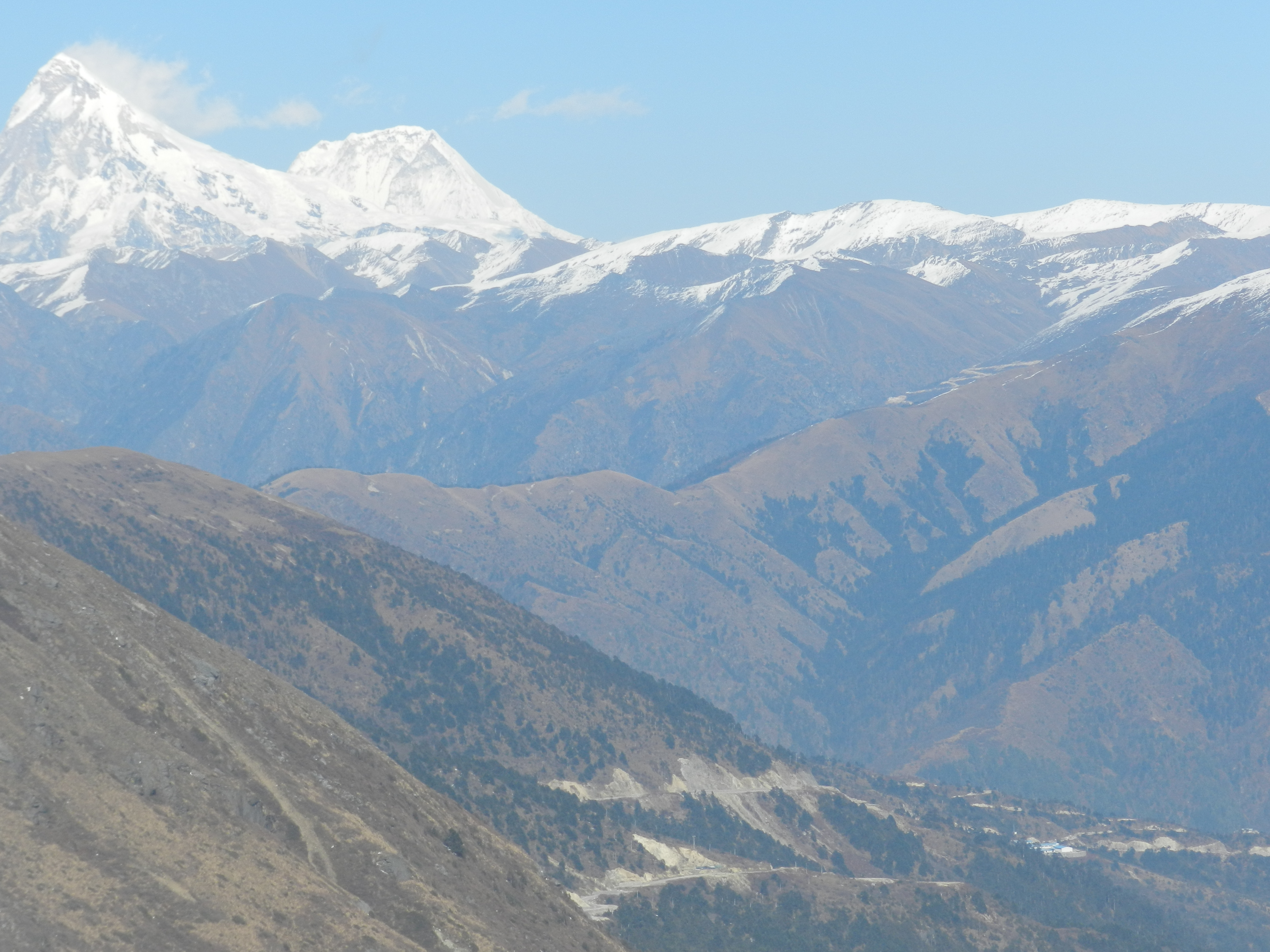
View of Indrasan and Deo Tibba peaks

Mahasu region has Himachal Pradesh's many of the highest mountain peaks, highest peak of the region is Parvati Parvat 6,633 metres (21,762 ft) others are Dibibokri Pyramid 6,408 metres (21,024 ft), Indrasan 6,220 metres (20,410 ft), Deo Tibba 6,001 metres (19,688 ft), Solang peak 5,975 metres (19,603 ft), Maiwa Kadinu 5,944 metres (19,501 ft), Umashila 5,294 metres (17,369 ft), Shintidhar 5,290 metres (17,360 ft), Shrikhand Mahadev 5,182 metres (17,001 ft), Inder Killa 4,940 metres (16,210 ft), Patalsu 4,470 metres (14,670 ft), Shacha Peak 3,540 metres (11,610 ft) all lies in Kullu district. Hanuman Tibba 5,895.48 metres (19,342.1 ft) at the border of Kullu and Bara Banghal area of Kangra district. Pishu 5,672 metres (18,609 ft), Gushu 5,607 metres (18,396 ft) both lies at the border of Kinnaur and Shimla districts, Chanshal Peak 4,520 metres (14,830 ft), Hatu Peak 3,400 metres (11,200 ft), Kuppar Peak 3,200 metres (10,500 ft), Kamlodi Mata Top 3,115 metres (10,220 ft), Shali Tibba 2,870 metres (9,420 ft), Chhichad Tibba 2,995 metres (9,826 ft) Dlondar Peak 2,854 metres (9,364 ft), Nag Tikkar 2,780 metres (9,120 ft) all lies in Shimla district. Nagru 4,020 metres (13,190 ft), Shikari Devi 3,359 metres (11,020 ft) Kamrunag 3,065 metres (10,056 ft), Tunga Mata Top 3,000 metres (9,800 ft), Shetadhar 2,990 metres (9,810 ft), Propt Dhar 2,900 metres (9,500 ft), Devidarh 2,872 metres (9,423 ft), Prashar 2,730 metres (8,960 ft), Winch Camp 2,700 metres (8,900 ft) all lies in Mandi district.The highest peak of whole Shivalik Range, Churdhar 3,647 metres (11,965 ft) at the border of Shimla and Sirmaur district.

== Culture ==
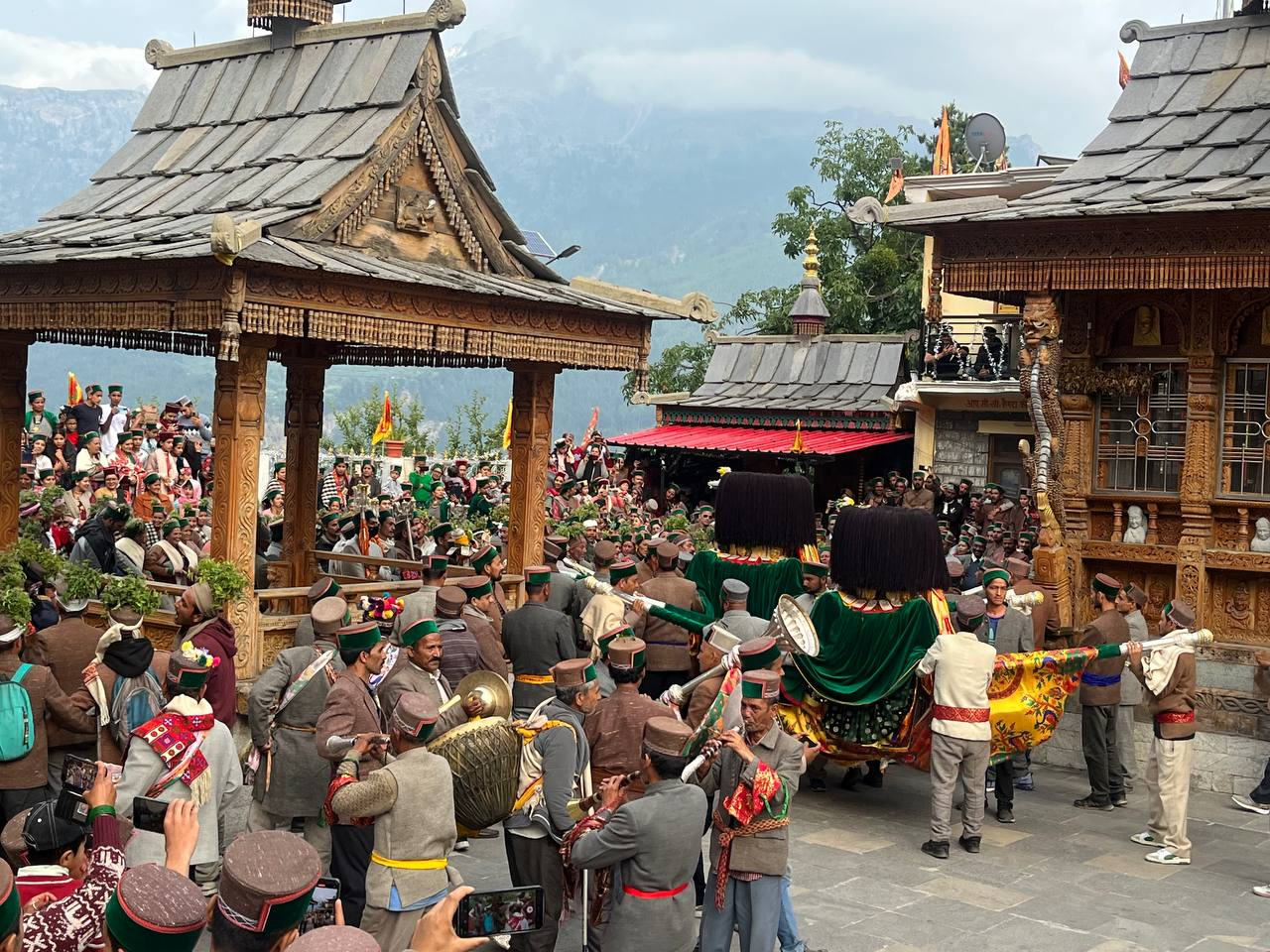
Dakhrain festival being celebrated in Kinnaur

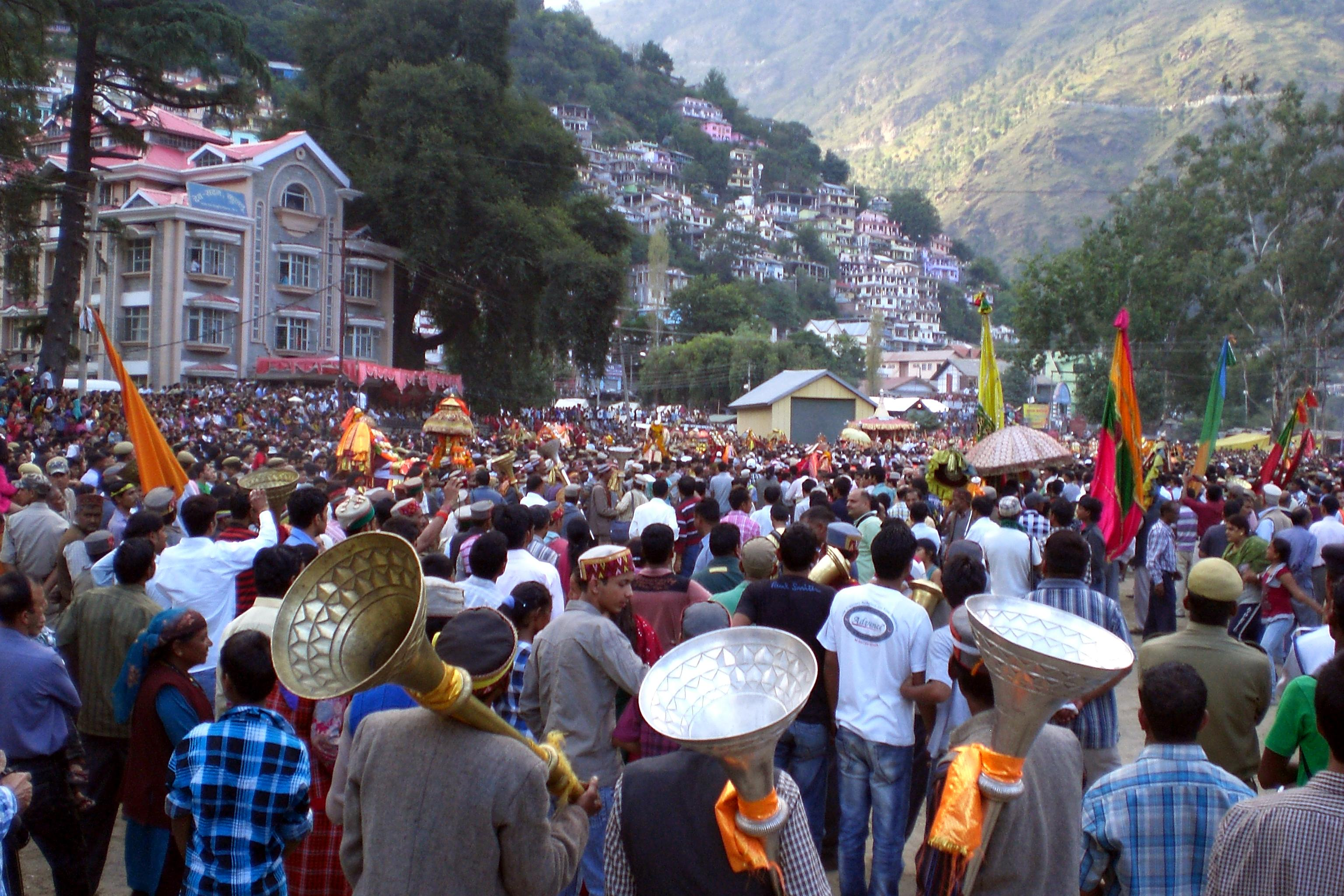
Kullu Dussehra

The culture of Mahasu region is deeply rooted in the folk Hindu traditions. The Mahasu region culturally and linguistically distincts from its mountainous cultural neighbour regions that of Garhwal region and Lower Himachal region (Trigarta region). Mahasu region primarily follows Dev Parampara. The region has many temples dedicated to particular Devta or Devi. People of the region has their own Kuldevta and Kuldevi (also known as Kulja in Mahasui). Mahasu Devta is one of the primary deity of the region represented by four brothers and known as Mahasu Devta collectively. Shri Raghunath Mandir in Kullu dedicated to Shri Rama is also one of the most worshipped and prominent deity of the region especially in Kullu and adjoining areas, as Shri Raghunath is another form of Shri Rama and worshipped as God not as Devta. The people of the region mainly believes in the authority of Devtas of the region or their Kul Devta and Kul Devi (family deity) or Gram Devta (village deity).

=== Temples ===
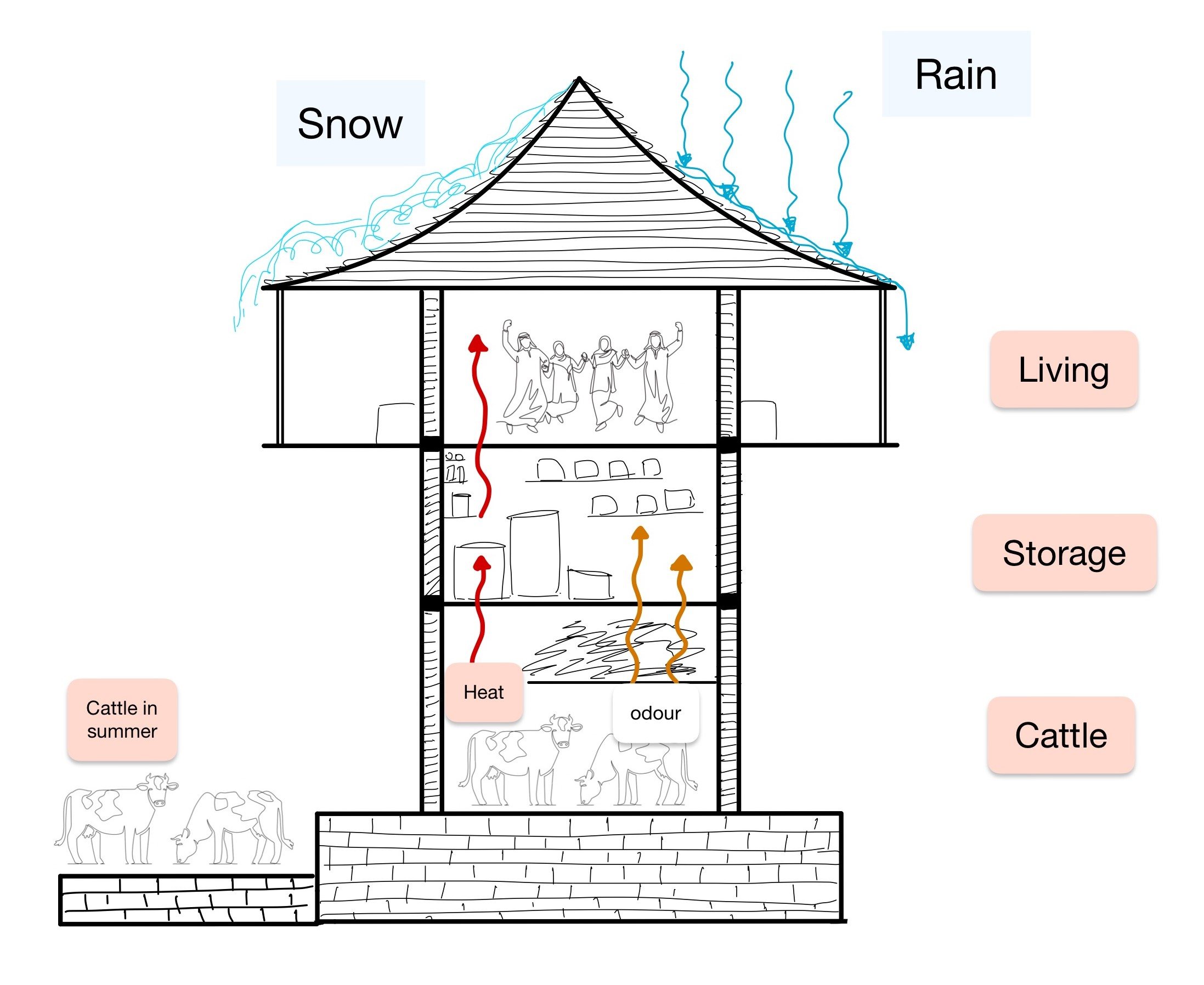
Kath Kuni architecture design

The building structures especially temples and some of the housings of the region mainly follows Kath Kuni and Nagara architectural styles in which the structures are made up with woods and stone materials, which is beneficial in winters as in snowfall and in heavy monsoons which is required in such mountainous terrain. Temples in the region are usually located on the hilltop.

==== Mahasu Devta Temple ====
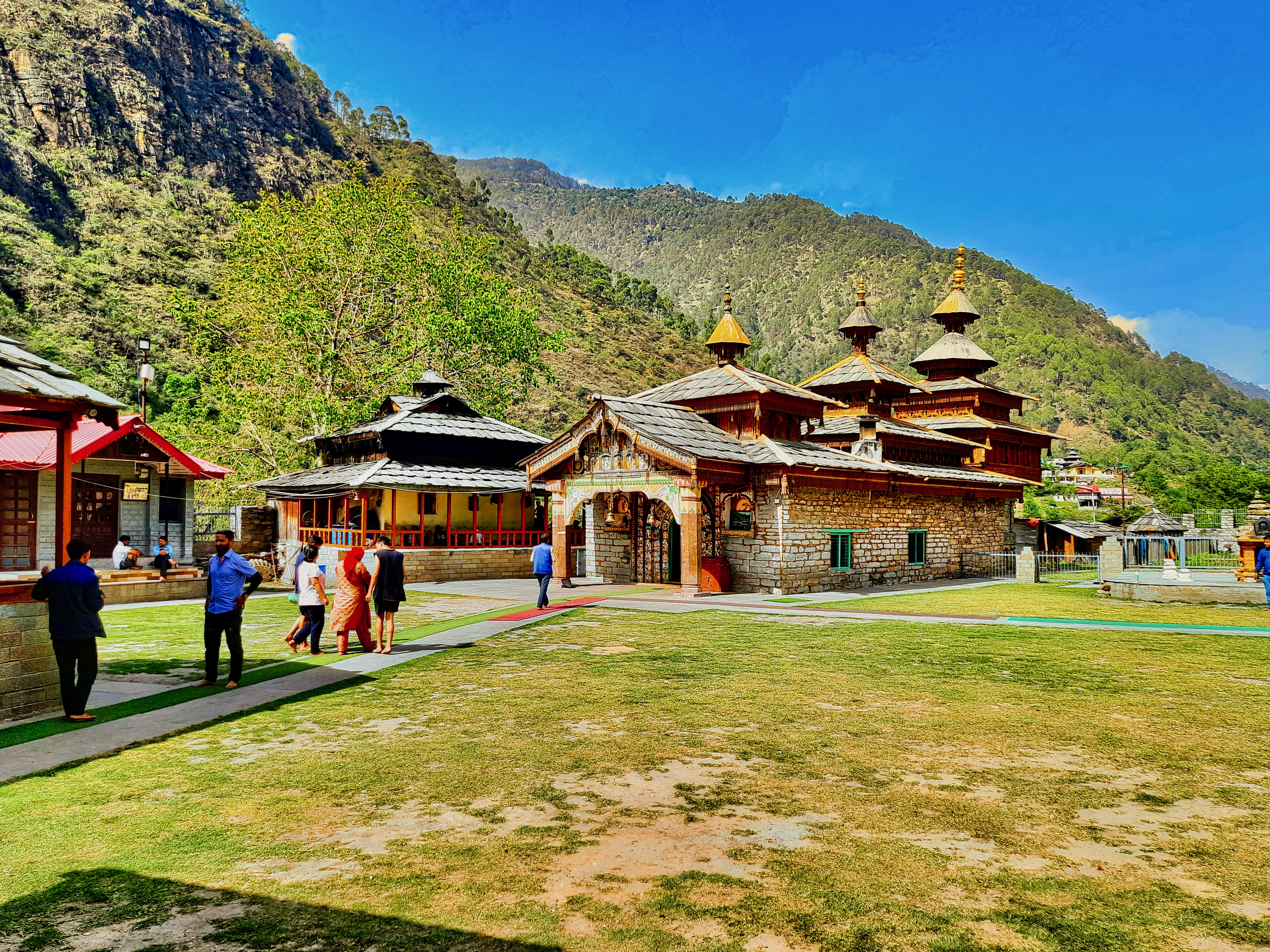
Mahasu Devta Mandir at Hanol, Jaunsar

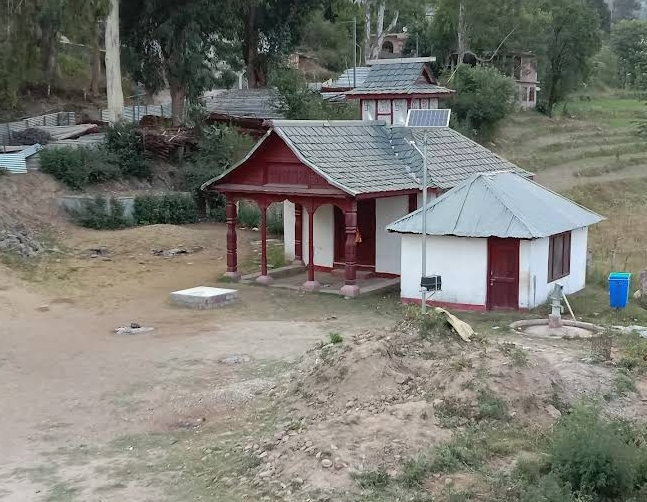
Dev Mahasu Mandir in Karsog, Mandi district

The primary temple of the region is Mahasu Devta Temple located in Hanol, Jaunsar. The temple is dedicated to the primary Devta of the region, Mahasu Devta. There are many temples dedicated to Mahasu Devta in whole of the region, as one is in Renuka Ji Tehsil in Sirmaur district. Mahasu Devta Jatar (Mahasu Devta Fair) is orgainsed in Shimla's Kotkhai area every year in the third Tuesday of Baisakh. Mahasu Devta is one of the primary deities of the region.

==== Shirgul Maharaj Temple ====
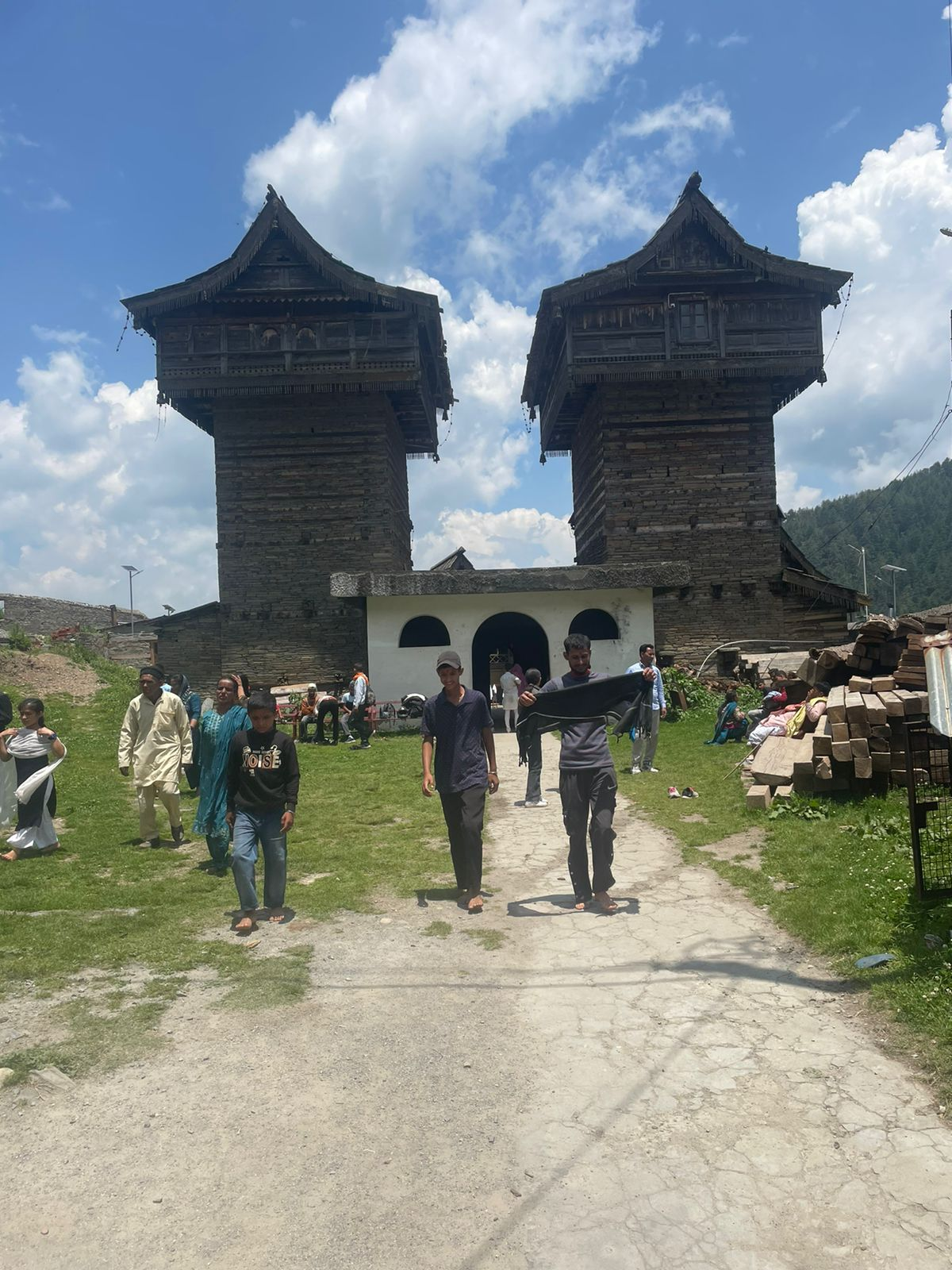
Shirgul Maharaj Mandir in Chaupal, Shimla

Shirgul Maharaj Devta is also one of the primary deities of the region. His main temple is located on Churdhar peak Sirmaur district. There are various temples dedicated to Shirgul Maharaj in whole of the Mahasu region as in Chaupal in Shimla district and in many other places of the region.

==== Naag Devta Temples ====
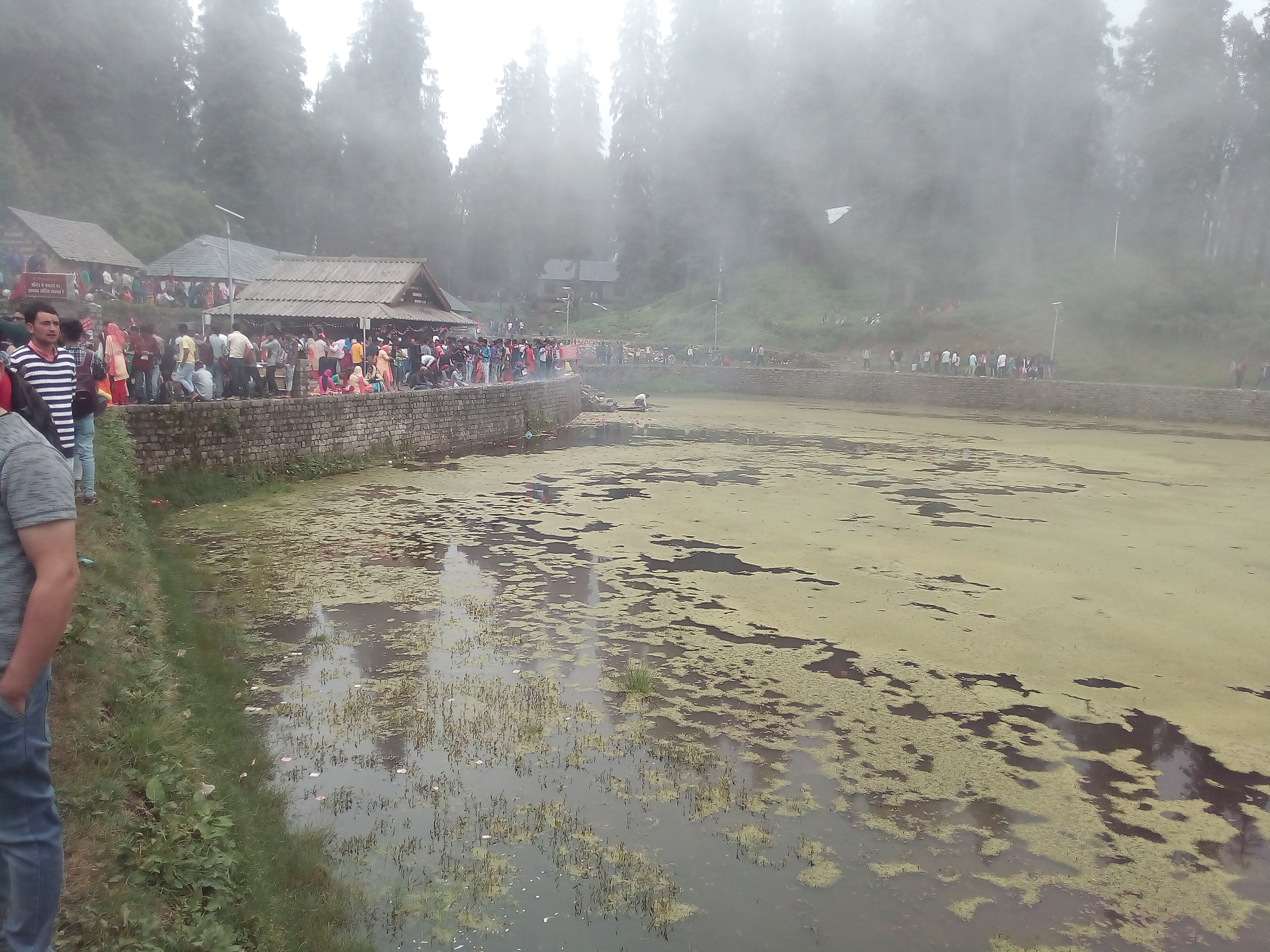
Kamrunag Temple and lake

The region has many temples dedicated to Naag Devta. Naag Devta (Serpent God) is also one the primary Devtas of the region. People believe that he saves them from all evils and problems. In maximum villages of the region there is at least one temple dedicated to Naag Devta. Major Naag Devta temples in the region are Mul Mahunag in Karsog in Mandi district, Mahunag Mandir Shagin in Shoghi, Shimla, Kamrunag in Mandi district, etc.

==== Ancestoral spirits ====
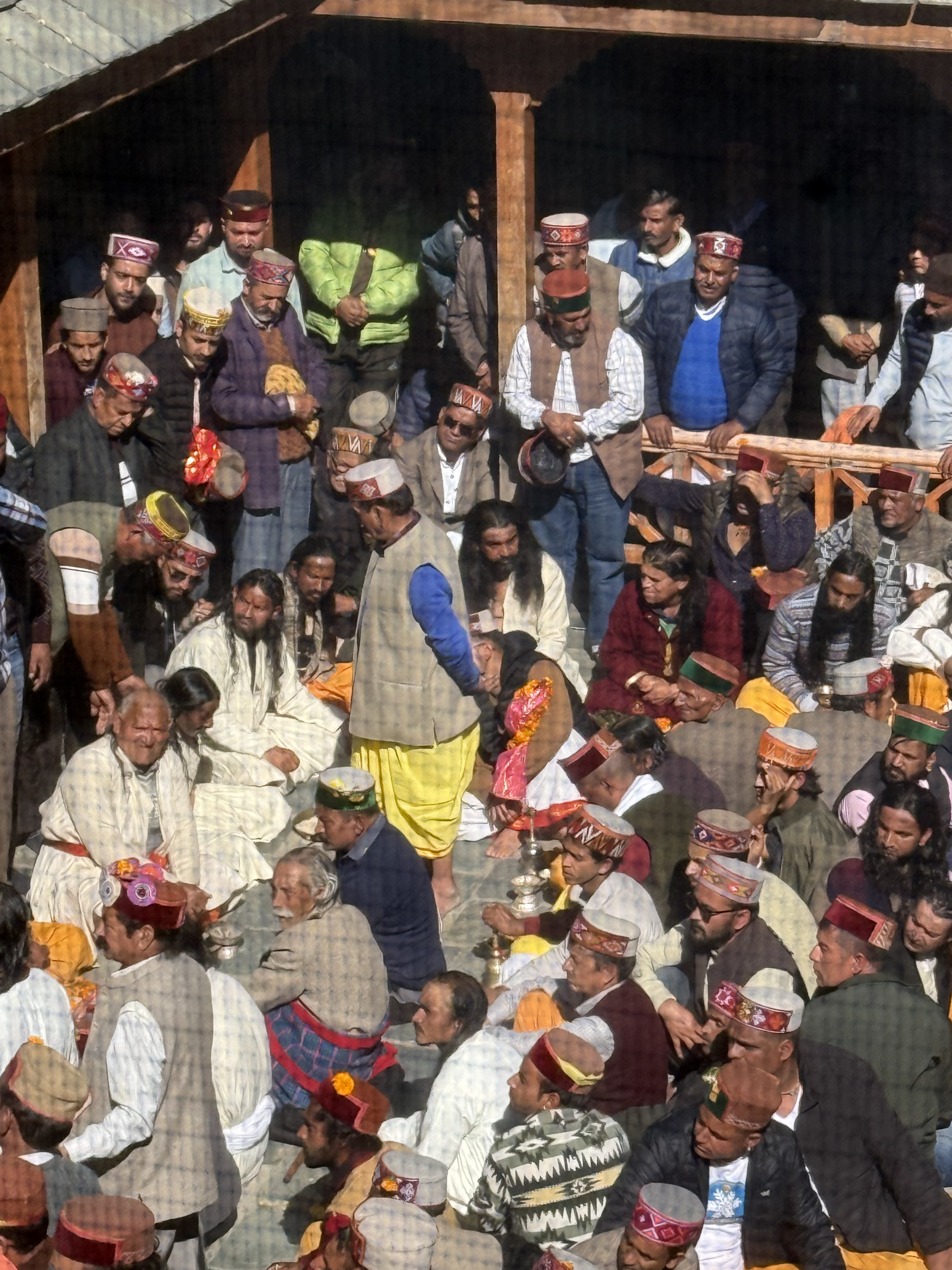
Gurs (Shamans) of Devta are sitting in opened long hair in the temple to perform the rituals

The people of the region also worship their spirits of their ancestors in the form of Devta or Kuldevta. There are temples dedicated to them and these Devtas connect and communicate to the people in the form of Gur (Shaman) also known as Deenva, Maali, etc. in various dialects of Mahasu Pahari and other languages of the region of the larger Mahasuic group.

=== Clothing and attire ===
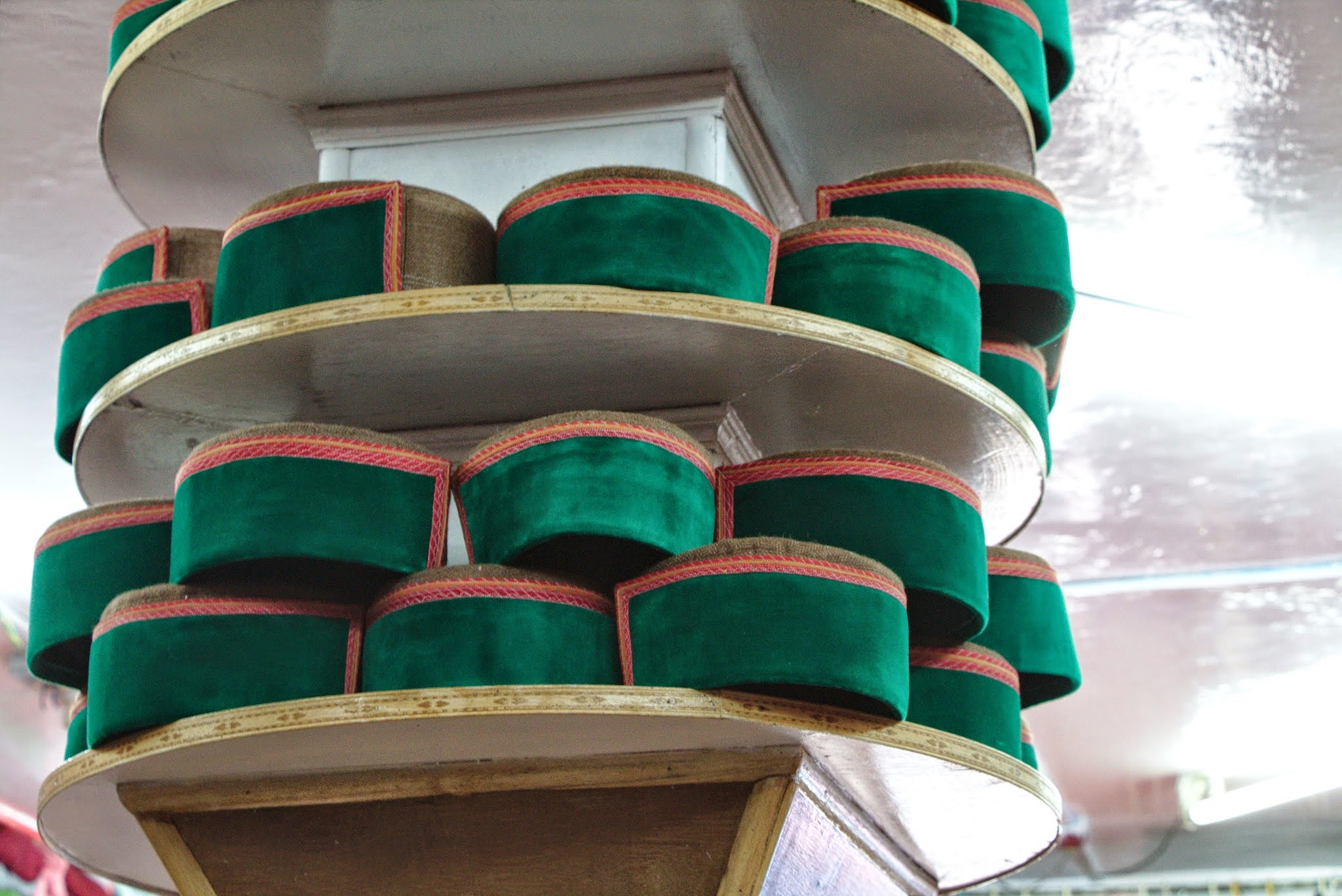
Himachali caps kept in a shop

The region's traditional attire reflects the cold mountainous environment. People wear Himachali cap as the main headwear worn by both men and women, Dhatu is also a headwear worn by the women of the region. Pattu mainly worn by men and Shawls and Chola by women. Rejta is also a long frock styled attire worn by women of the region. People also wear many handcrafted ornaments and handwoven attires.

=== Music and dance ===
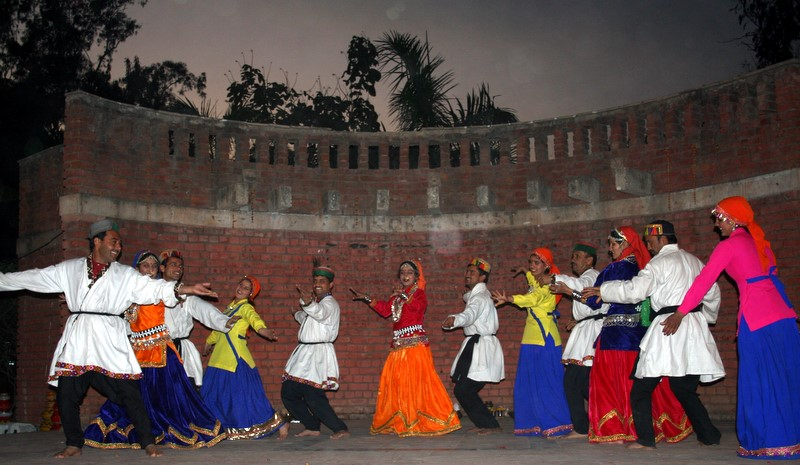
Nati, a dance form of the region

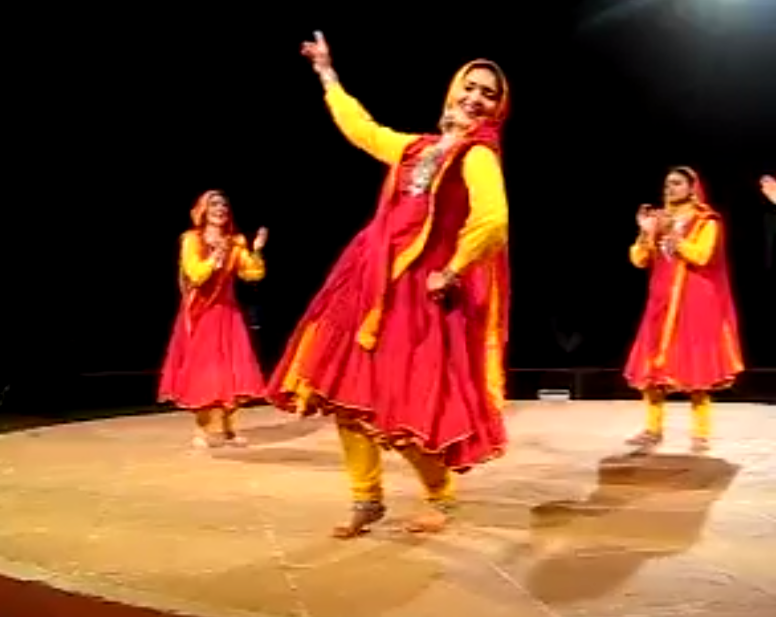
Women performing Pahari Giddha (Parhaun), mainly performed in Solan district and Keonthal area of Shimla district in the region

The people of the Mahasu region has their traditional dance and music form Nati. Nati has different styles in the region in many areas such as Kulluvi Nati, Baradi Nati in Jaunsar, Jaunpur (Tehri Garhwal) and Mussoorie in Uttarakhand. Many other dance forms apart from Nati are also followed by people such as, in Sirmaur and Jaunsar areas, Hathi, Harul and Thandi dance forms are performed by people on festivals and celebratory occasions. In Keonthal area of Shimla and in Solan Pahari Giddha is also performed in marriages and festivities, as well as Gangi (Pahari form of Tappa) are performed by the women of the families.

Jhoori is another type of music form which celebrates romance, the word Jhoori means lover and is accompanied by female dance called Jhoomar. Laman form of music is from Kullu are another type music form that celebrates romance.

=== Fairs, festivals and ritual calendars ===
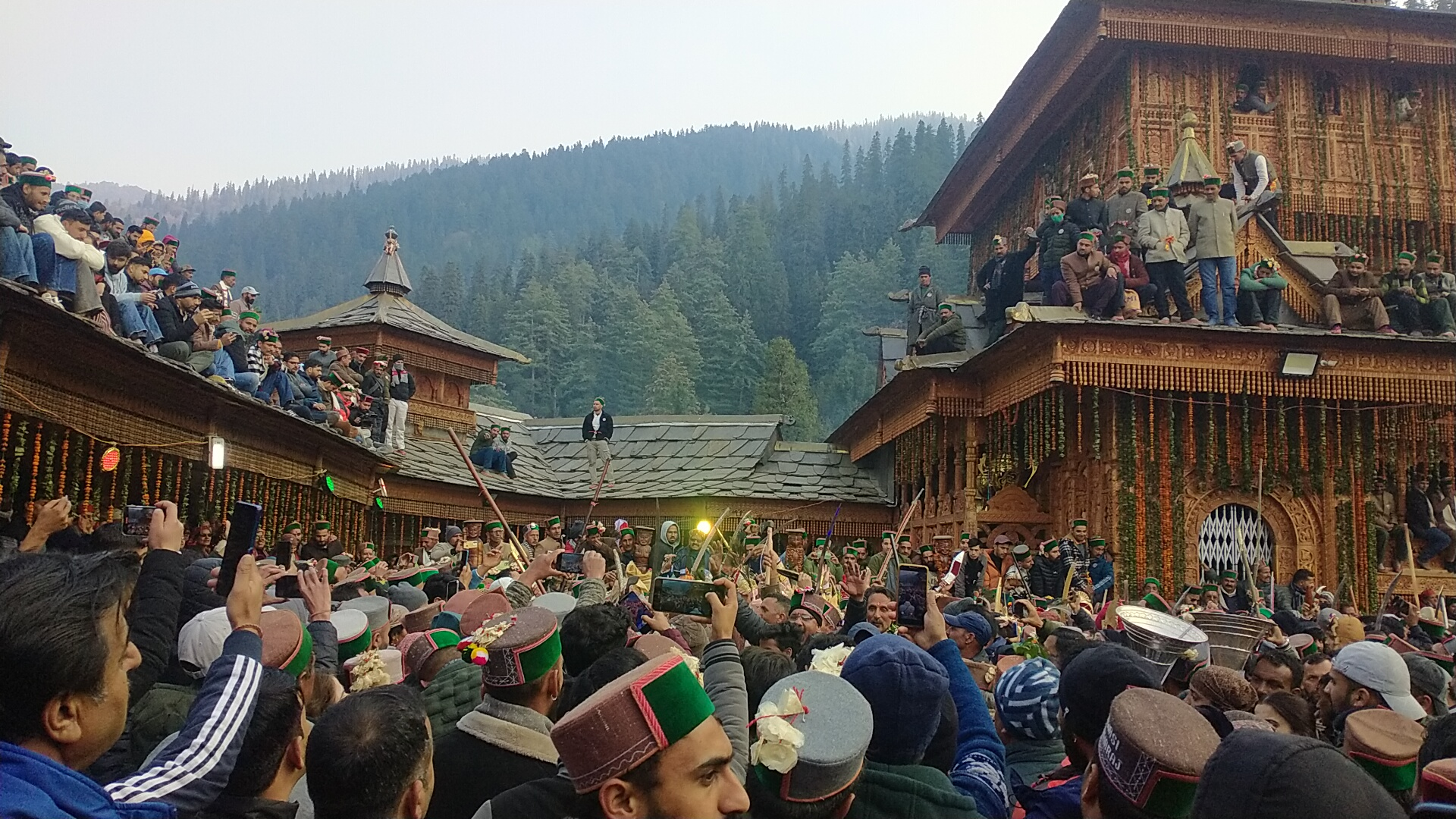
Shant Mahayagya Gwas in Rohru, Shimla

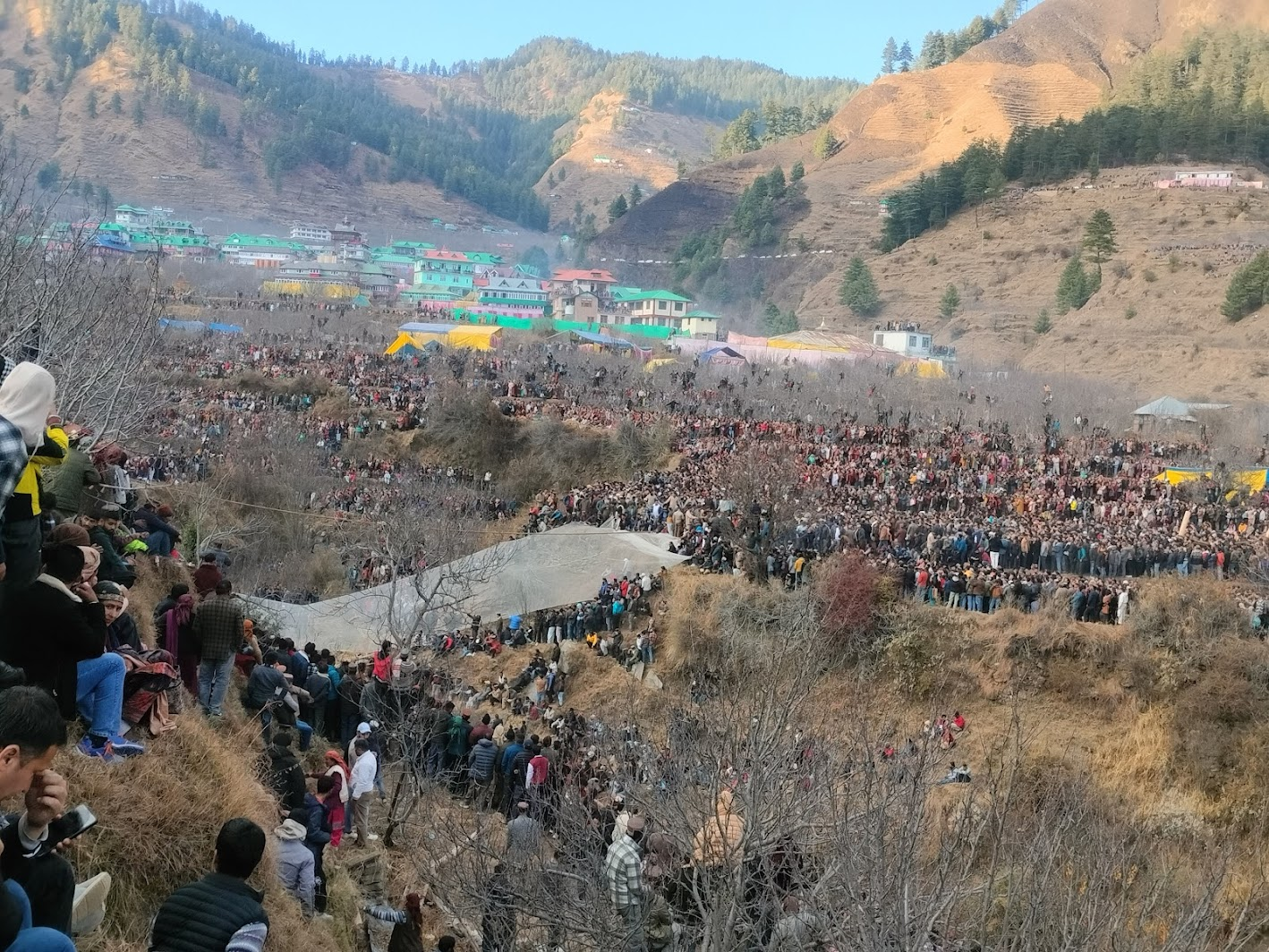
Bhunda festival in Rohru, in this festival a man slides by rope from uphill to downhill

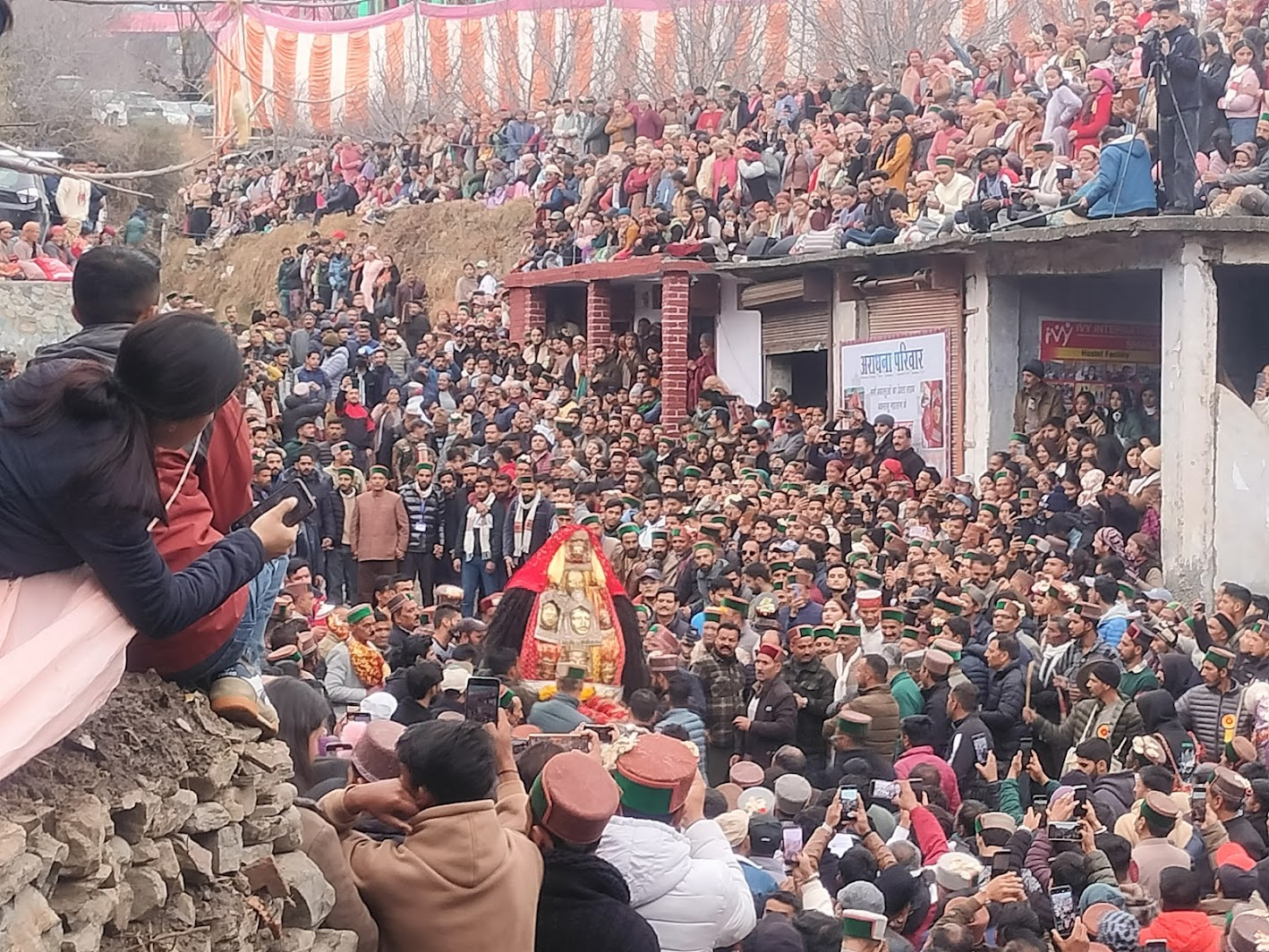
Procession of Bakralu Devta

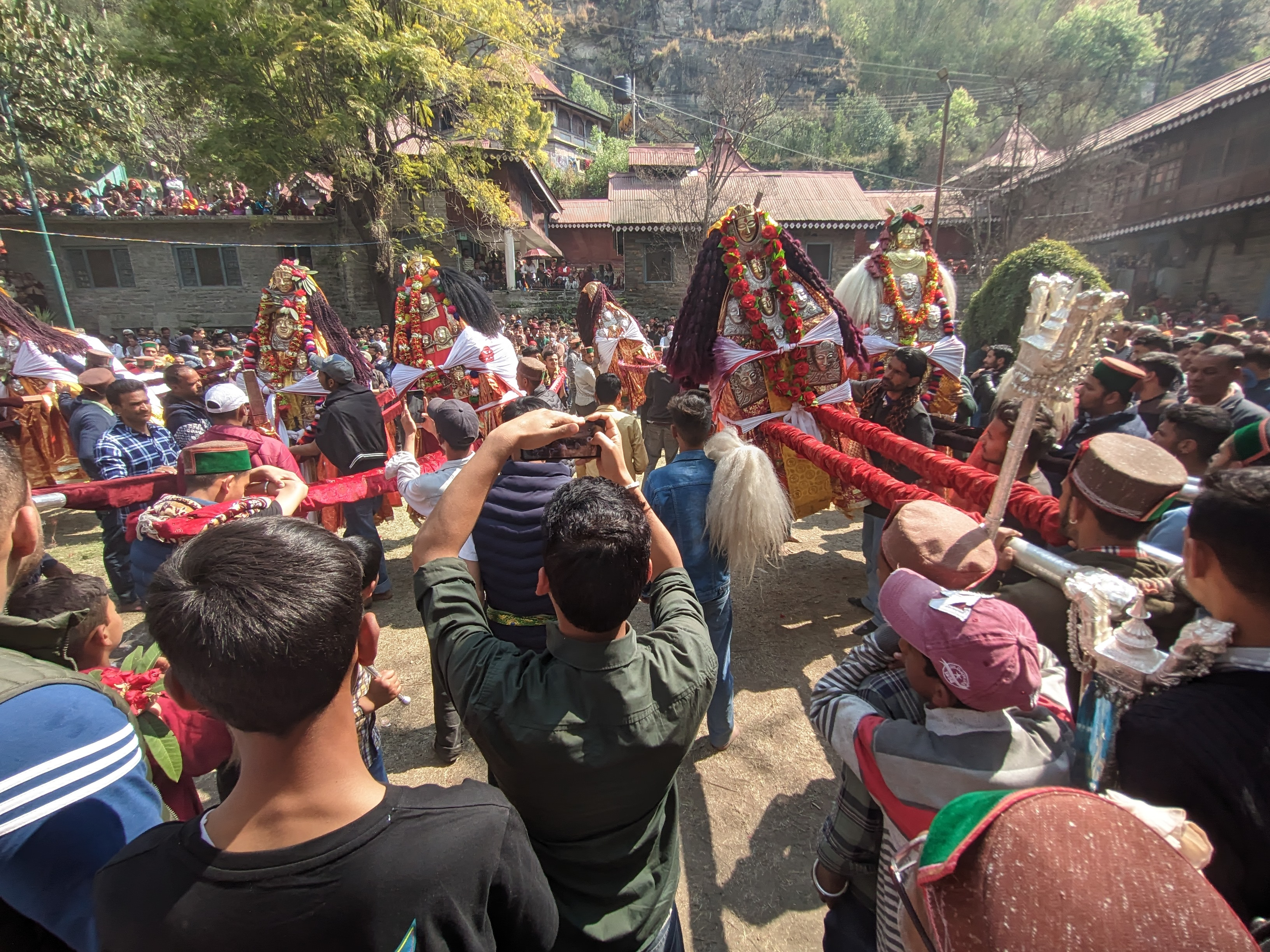
A local festival in Rampur Bushahr where Devta palanquin (Ratha) can be seen

As per the people of the region mainly follows Hinduism, all the festivals relation to the region are celebrated with pure joy and enthusiasm like any other region of the country but the different forms of festivals which the people of the region celebrate are as the society of the region mainly involves agrarian community, they have their own ritual calendar of the festivals, such major festivals include Bishu which is spring harvest celebration, Mahasu Devta Jatar (Fair) is organised in Shimla district's Kotkhai area every year on the third Tuesday of the Baisakh is per Hindu Calendar, natives perform Nati and Rasa (another form of traditional dance of the region) in the fair. Fagli which is winter festival involving masked performances. Local deities fairs where the village deities are ceremonially in palanquins (rathas) like Bakralu Devta Bhunda festival, Shaant Mahayagya Jharag which was the largest event of centuries old tradition and much smaller in Gwas in Rohru and adjoining areas and alike other such feastivals and fairs. Lavi fair is the largest celebrated fair of the region which happens in Rampur Bushahr. Budhi Diwali is also one of the prominent region celebrated in whole of the region like Shimla, Kullu but especially celebrated by the Hattee sub-community in the region, in Sirmaur and Jaunsar, after the actual Diwali for a month.

== Languages ==
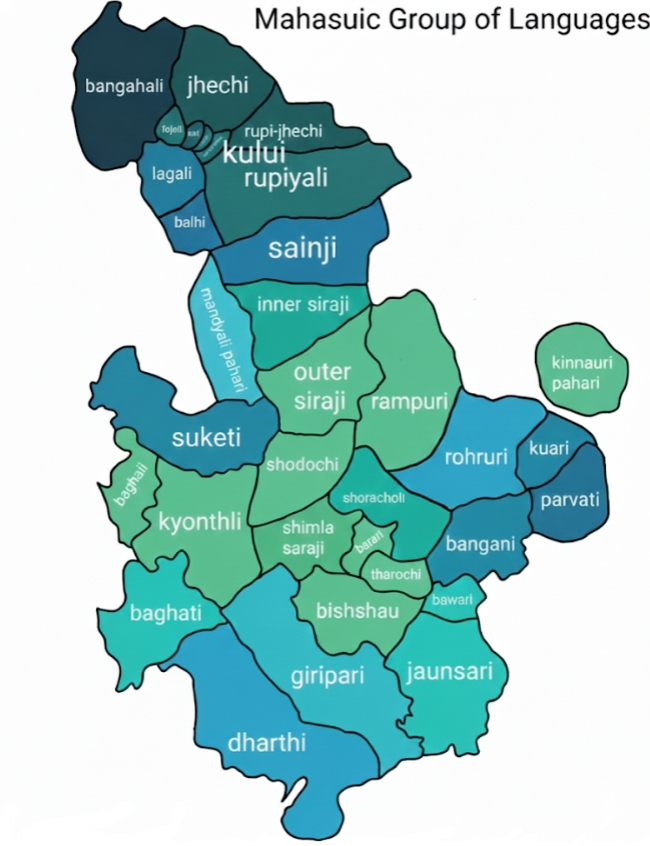
G.A. Grierson's map of Mahasuic group of languages

Rohruri dialect of Mahasu Pahari, one of the primary languages of the region

There are many languages spoken in the region and all the languages are closely related to each other and all are grouped under Nuclear Himachali and Mahasuic linguistic group of Western Pahari. The primary regional language of the region is Mahasui or Mahasu Pahari. It is spoken in whole of the Shimla district, Solan district and south-western parts of Uttarkashi district. The language has many dialects such as Kochi, Sudochi, Bishashau, etc in upper Shimla district and Keonthali, etc in lower Shimla district. In Solan district Baghati, Baghliani and Hinduri dialects of Mahasui are spoken. In Kalka, Pinjore of Panchkula district in Haryana Baghati dialect is spoken. In Uttarkashi district's Ravain, Buari, Bangan, Parvat, etc. regions Bangani and Parvati are the primary dialects of Mahasui. Sirmauri is spoken in the Sirmaur district, it has two dialects, Giripari and Giriwari (Dharti). Giriwari is spoken in the North of Giri river and Giripari (Dharti) in southern Sirmaur district that is on the southern side of Giri river, as well as in the hilly parts of Kalesar in Yamunanagar district in Haryana. In Dehradun district's Jaunsar-Bawar area, Jaunsari and its dialects like Bawari, etc are spoken, it is closely related to Sirmauri language. In Kullu district, the Kullui language is spoken, it has also many dialects under it such as Inner Siraji, Outer Siraji, Rupiyali, Jheechi, etc. In Kangra district's Bara Bhangal (remotest area in Himachal Pradesh), Bangahali dialect of Kullui is spoken. In upper parts of Mandi district some dialects of Kullui and Mahasu Pahari are spoken such as Suketi, Mandyali Pahari, Balhi, etc, which differs from the standard Mandeali language spoken in lower Mandi district. These are the languages and some of the notable dialects of Mahasu Pahari and other languages which are closely related to each other in the region but there are many sub-dialects of the dialects of these languages also, which change within some distance.

== See also ==
- List of Hindu deities
- Cultural Zones of India
