= Suppiramaniam =

Suppiramaniam is a masculine given name in Sri Lanka. Notable people with this name include:

- Suppiramaniam Vithiananthan (1924 – 1989), a Sri Lankan writer and academic
- Suppiramaniam Mahadeva (born 1893 – fl. until 1945), a Sri Lankan civil engineer
