= Mahadeva =

Mahadeva may refer to:

== Religion ==
- Mahadeva, a title of the Hindu god Shiva
  - Parashiva, a form of Shiva
  - Parameshwara (god), a form of Shiva
- Para Brahman, a Hindu deity
- Adi-Buddha, in Buddhism, the "First Buddha" or the "Primordial Buddha"
- Mahadeva (Buddhism), founder of the Caitika school of Indian Buddhism or a literary figure associated with 5 points of contention in some Theravada works
- Taidi, in Chinese folk religion

== People with the name ==
- Mahadeva (Buddhism), founder of the Caitika school of Indian Buddhism or a literary figure associated with 5 points of contention in some Theravada works
- Mahadeva (Kakatiya dynasty), 12th-century ruler of India
- Mahadeva of Devagiri, a 13th-century ruler of the Yadava dynasty of India
- Mahadeva (undertaker), a recipient of the Chief Minister's gold medal from the city of Bangalore, India
- Mahadeva Iyer Ganapati (1903–1976), Indian engineer
- Arunachalam Mahadeva (1885–1969), Ceylon Tamil lawyer, politician and diplomat
- Baku Mahadeva (1921–2013), Sri Lankan Tamil civil servant
- Devanur Mahadeva (born 1948), Indian writer and public intellectual
- Kumar Mahadeva, Sri Lankan American businessman
- S. Mahadeva (1893–?), Ceylon Tamil civil engineer
- Mahadeva Subramania Mani (1908–2003), Indian entomologist

== Places ==
- Mahadeva, Barabanki, Nepal
- Mahadeva, Kosi, Nepal
- Mahadeva, Sagarmatha, Nepal

== See also ==
- Mahadev (disambiguation)
- Mahadevan (disambiguation)
- Mahadevi, Hindu goddess
- Mahadevi (film), 1957 Indian film by Sundar Rao Nadkarni
- Bolton v Mahadeva, an English contract law case
