= Shikari Devi Temple =

- शिकारी देवी मन्दिर
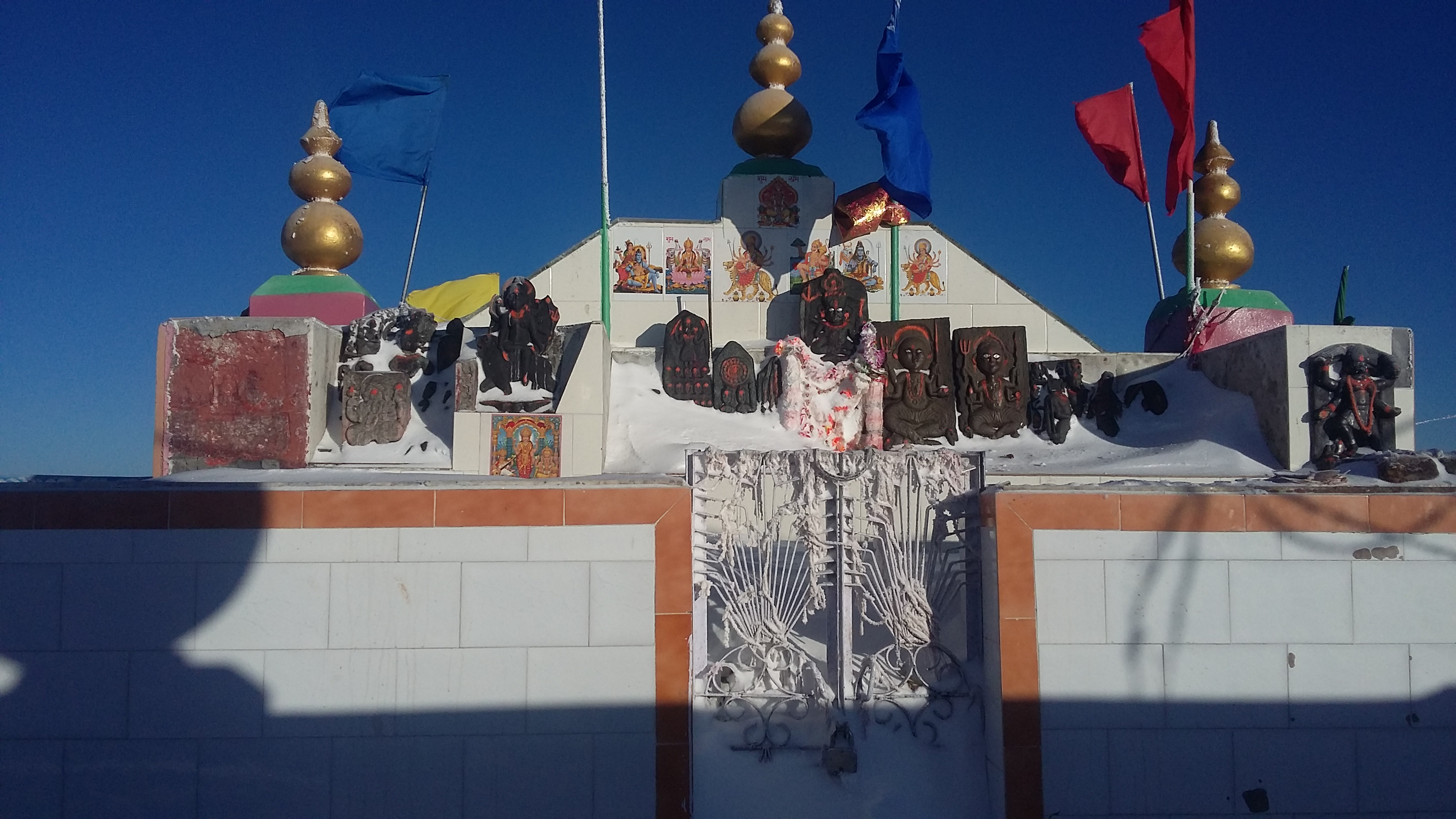
- Shikari Devi Temple

- Location in Himachal Pradesh Shikari Devi Temple (India)

Religion
- Affiliation: Hinduism
- District: Mandi
- Deity: Durga
- Festival: Navratri

Location
- Location: Shikari Devi Sanctuary, Shikari Peak, Janjheli, Karsog
- State: Himachal Pradesh
- Country: India
- Coordinates: 31.478716°N 77.165572°E

Architecture
- Creator: Pandavas on their exile during Mahabharata
- Established: original structure: Ancient (unknown)

Specifications
- Elevation: 3,332.6 m (10,934 ft)

Shikari Devi Temple is a popular Hindu temple dedicated to goddess Durga in the form of Hunter's Goddess (in Hindi: Shikari Devi). The temple is located 18 kilometres (11 mi) from Sanarli in Karsog valley and at the same distance from Janjheli which is on the other side of the hill, through steep road to the temple in Mandi district of the North Indian state of Himachal Pradesh. It is believed that the temple was established by the Pandavas during their exile at the time of Mahabharata.

== History and legends ==
=== Origin ===
It is believed that the temple dates to the time of Mahabharata, when the Pandavas during their exile visited many places in Himalayas as this was one of them, and according to tradition they started worshiping Shikari Devi here and constructed the shrine.

=== Connection with sages ===
It is also believed that Rishi Markendeya meditated here for many years. Goddess Durga was pleased by his devotion and appeared to him, instructing him to build the shrine.

=== Divine visions leading to temple ===
According to another legend, the Pandavas once during their hunt came across a mystical deer that disappeared into the forest. As they approached the deer, they realised that this deer is the goddess herself and had come in the form of a deer to guide them. Therefore, as per her guidance they meditated here and subsequently built the temple.

=== Worship by hunters ===
Historically, the local hunters used to worship the Shikari Devi for their success in their hunts, hence the epithet, "Shikari Devi" (in English: the goddess of hunters). The goddess was invoked for protection against dangers by wild animals during their hunting. This reflects how nature, faith and livelihood merged in this region.

== Architecture and unique features ==
=== Roofless shrine ===
The temple differs from other temples in that it is roofless. Local traditions hold that many people, have tried to build a roof over it for many years, but none of the roofs have stayed intact. The former Chief Minister of Himachal Pradesh, Virbhadra Singh, also tried to build roof over the temple many times but none was a success. It is believed that the goddess prefers the sky as her canopy, not any roof.

=== Snowfree premises ===
Another reported phenomena associated with the temple is that, during snowfall, the entire region is buried in several feet of snow but the temple's premises especially the interior, are said to remain free of snow. The reason for this has not been established till now. According to local belief, this is attributed to the power of the goddess Shikari Devi.

== Belief ==
It is believed that whatever is prayed here by true self, it manifests reality. It is also believed that who often come here with any sort of problems in one's life, the goddess removes all and gives whatever is asked.

=== Navratri pilgrimages ===
The temple receives a large influx of devotees during the festival of Navratri, both in spring and autumn. People come here to seek the blessings of the goddess Shikari Devi.

=== Traditional offerings ===
As per local custom, devotees bring offerings like ghee lamps, coconuts and Dhvajas (traditional in Hinduism). Many people whose wishes got fulfilled by the blessings of the goddess come to the shrine bare feet, and present offerings to the temple such as cash, Chattra, or any form of offerings the pilgrims like and as then Pandit of the temple describes them. In earlier times, animals were offered in sacrifice as a practice tied to older hunter traditions, though by the time, it was increasingly viewed with disapproval by many in older times.

== Geography ==
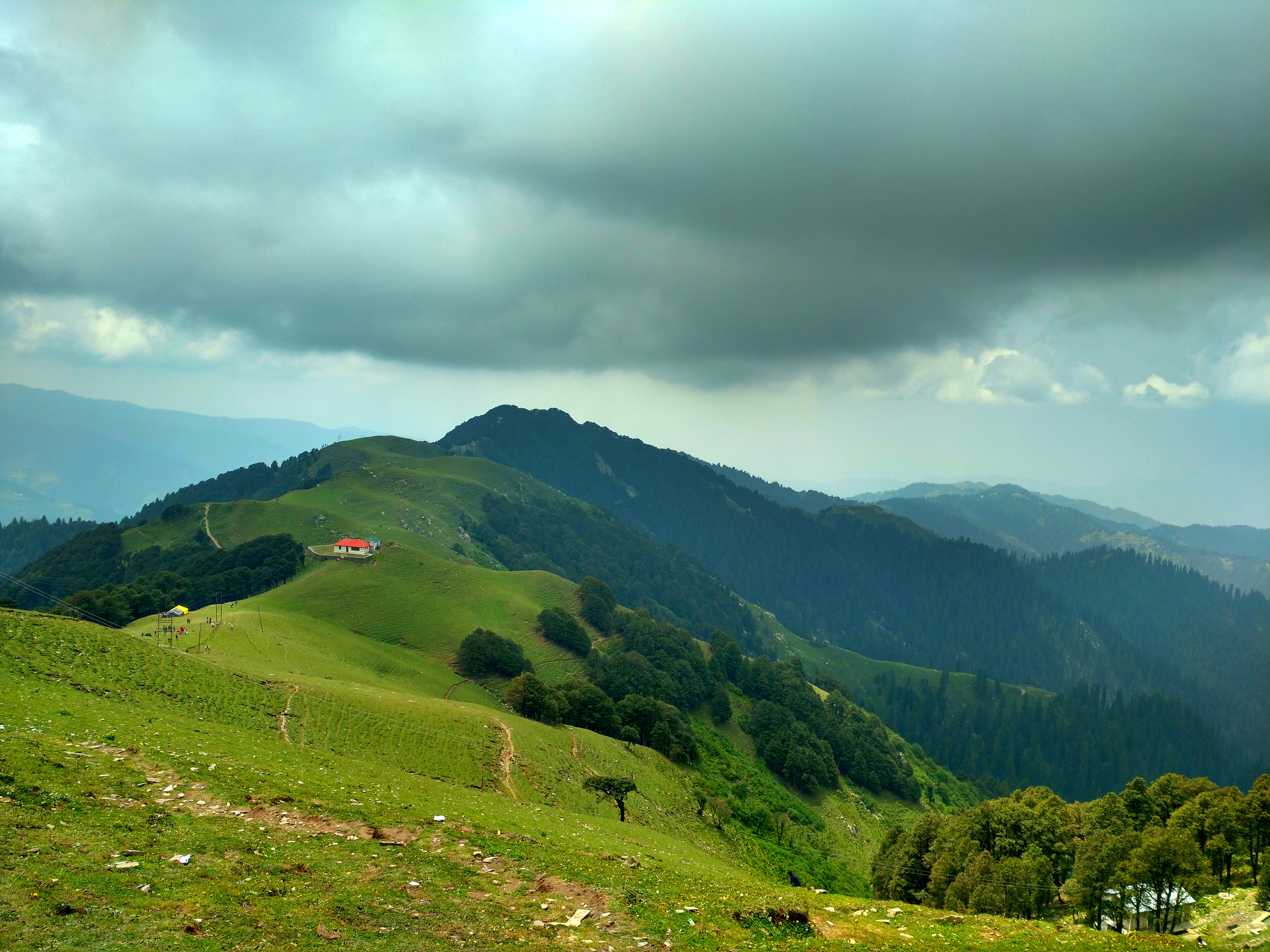
Scenic views from Shikari Devi Temple

The temple stands atop the Shikari Devi peak, the highest peak in Mandi district. The region around the temple is a natural sanctuary region called as Shikari Devi Sanctuary. Often it is called the 'Crown of Mandi'. The temple attracts the tourists through its miracles as well as through the scenic views of nature. From the temple many other peaks, valleys and places can be seen, as it is situated at the top of Shikari Devi peak and it is one of the highest peaks in Himachal Pradesh. Shimla, Kasauli, Solan, and Rewalsar can be seen from the temple. In valleys Kangra valley, Kullu valley, Satluj valley, Solang valley, Balh valley in Mandi, etc. can be seen. The peaks which can be seen from the temple are Mul Mahunaag, Kamrunaag, Dhauladhars, Parvati Parvat, Mulkila, Indrasan, Shrikhand Mahadev in Himachal Pradesh and Yamunotri, Kalanag, and many peaks of Uttarkashi in Uttarakhand can also be seen from the temple. In plains, Punjab plains can be seen when the weather is clear.

== Accessibility ==
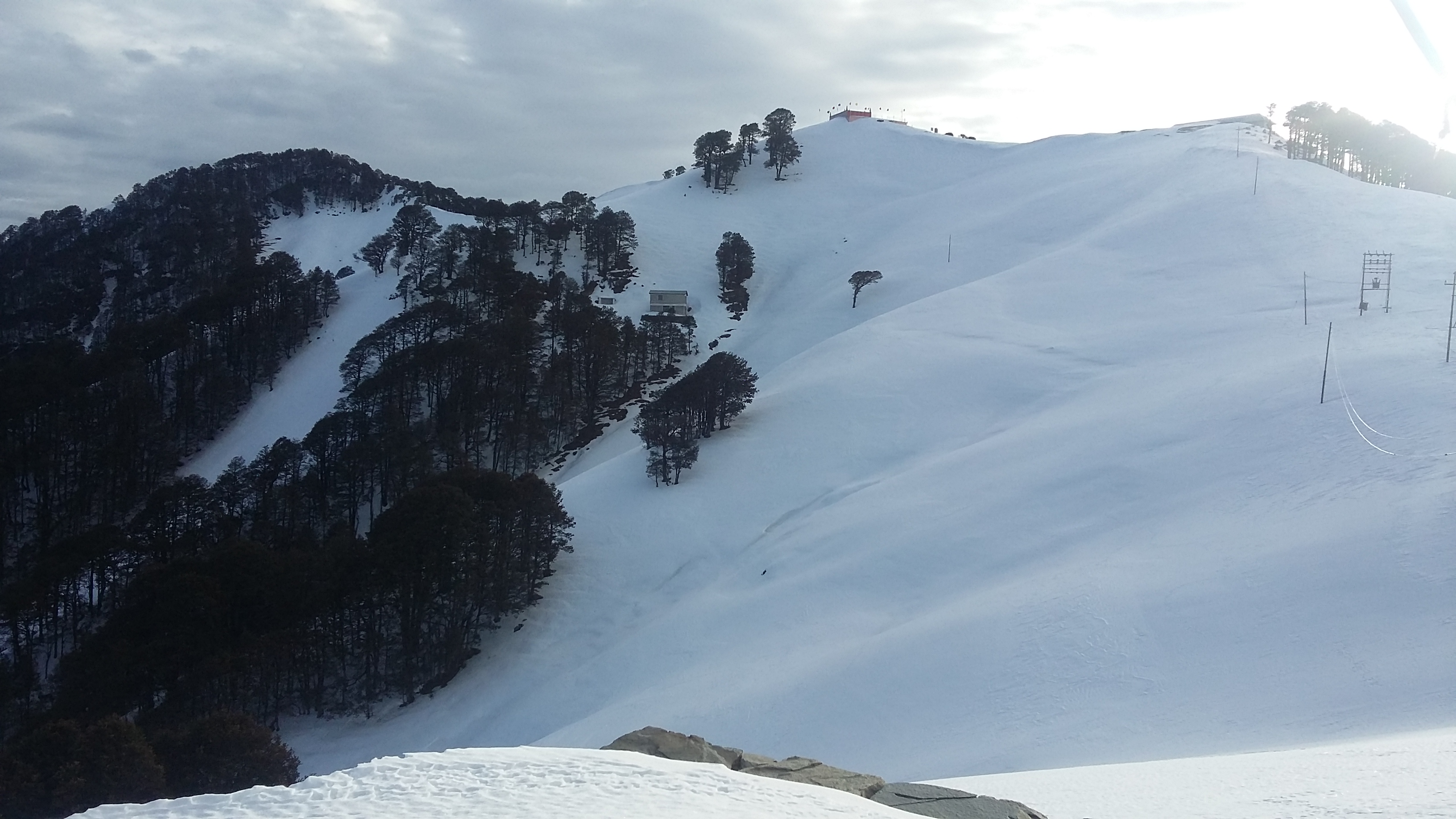
Views from temple in winters during snowfall

The temple is situated at the top of the Shikari peak. It is about 31 kilometres (19 mi) from Thunag. It is accessible through two major roads which are from Janjheli and another from Snarli in Karsog valley, both are 18 kilometres (11 mi) ride to the temple and both roads have forested terrain and steep roads which lead to the temple. The temple is also accessible by a trek from Karsog valley, as it is steep trek so many prefer the journey by road. Below the temple, the parking is allotted and from there 600-700 stairs are there to the temple.

From the temple, the panoramic views of surrounding Himalayan ranges, dense oak and conifer forests, vast meadows, and sometimes snow-laden landscapes can be seen.

== Religious and cultural significance today ==
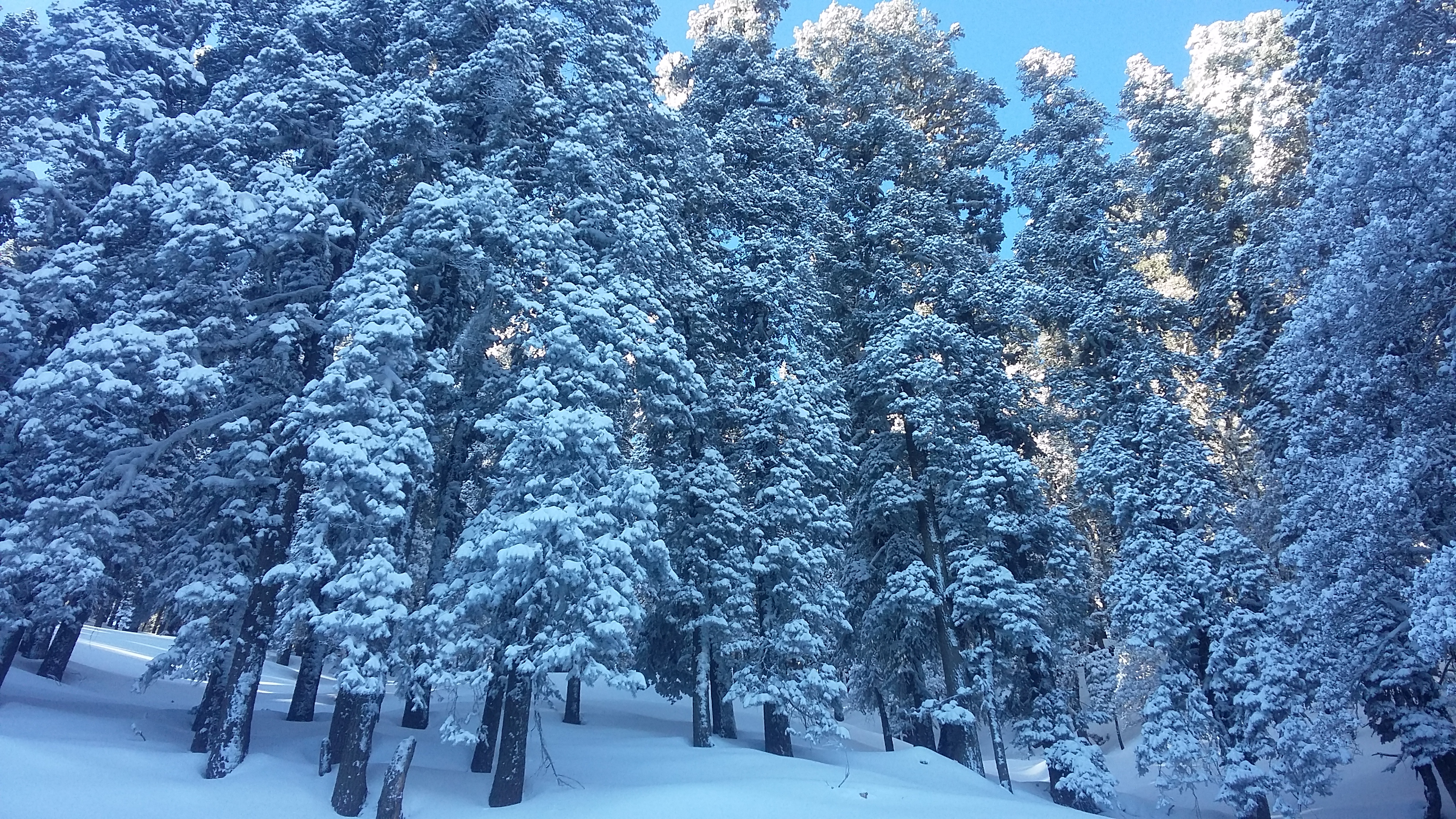
Shikari Devi wildlife sanctuary during snowfall

Shikari Devi Sanctuary, surrounding the temple, is itself a protected forest and wildlife area. The sanctity given to the temple and the deity encourages local ecological balance. The forest is revered, the wildlife respected, reflecting a traditional harmony between spirituality and nature.

For many devotees in Himachal Pradesh and beyond, Shikari Devi is regarded as a guardian of the forests, wildlife, and mountain travellers. The site's religious significance, natural surroundings attracts pilgrims, trekkers and nature lovers.
