= Mahadevan =

Mahadevan may refer to:

== People ==
- Anand Mahadevan (born 1979), Indian-Canadian writer
- Anant Mahadevan, actor and director of Marathi and Hindi films and television serials in India
- Iravatham Mahadevan (1930–2018), Indian epigraphist, specializing on the Indus script and Early Tamil epigraphy
- K. V. Mahadevan (1918–2001), south Indian music composer
- Kumar Mahadevan (born 1959), Indian chef, restaurateur, and media personality
- Lakshminarayanan Mahadevan, Indian-American mathematician and scientist at Harvard University
- Mahadevan (actor) (born 1961), Indian actor who made his debut in Pithamagan (2003)
- Mahadevan Sathasivam (1915–1977), Sri Lankan cricketer
- Mahesh Mahadevan (1955–2002), Indian film composer in the 1990s
- Nithyasree Mahadevan (born 1973), Carnatic musician and playback singer
- Rajan Mahadevan (born 1957), numerically gifted memorist born in Madras, India
- Raman Mahadevan (born 1978), Indian playback singer, known for his Bollywood songs
- S. Mahadevan (1904–1957), Ceylon Tamil businessman
- Shankar Mahadevan (born 1967), Indian music composer and singer
- Siddharth Mahadevan, Indian film composer
- T.M.P. Mahadevan (1911–1983)
- TS Mahadevan (born 1957), Indian Kerala state cricketer

=== Characters ===
- Major Mahadevan, protagonist in the Major Mahadevan film series

== Films ==
- C. I. Mahadevan 5 Adi 4 Inchu, 2004 Malayalam comedy thriller film directed by K. K. Haridas
- Sahadevan Mahadevan, Tamil film starring Mohan, released in 1988

== See also ==
- Mahadev (disambiguation)
- Mahadeva (disambiguation)
- Mahadevi
- Mahidevran (1500s–1581)
