= Mahadev =

Mahadev may refer to:

- Shiva, a primary Hindu deity
  - Parashiva, a form of Shiva
  - Parameshwara (god), a form of Shiva
- Para Brahman, a Hindu deity
- Mahadev, Nepal
- Mount Mahadev, a mountain peak in the Kashmir Valley
- Kailashnath Mahadev Statue in Nepal
- Operation Mahadev, 2025 Indian counter-insurgency operation during the insurgency in Jammu and Kashmir

== People ==
- Mahadev Desai (1892–1942), Indian independence activist
- Mahadev Govind Ranade (1842–1901), Indian scholar and social reformer
- Mahadev Saha (born 1944), Bangladeshi poet

== See also ==
- Devon Ke Dev...Mahadev, an Indian TV series which ran 2011-2014
- Mahadeva (disambiguation)
- Mahadevi, Hindu goddess
- Mahadevi (film), 1957 Indian film by Sundar Rao Nadkarni
- Mahadev & Sons, Indian television family drama series
