= Mahadev, Nepal =

Mahadev, Nepal महादेव
- Municipality
- Country: Nepal
- Zone: Karnali Zone
- District: Jumla District

Population (1991)
  - Total: 1,828
- Time zone: UTC+5:45 (Nepal Time)

Mahadev is a village development committee in Jumla District in the Karnali Zone of north-western Nepal. At the time of the 1991 Nepal census it had a population of 1828 persons living in 343 individual households.
