= Indrasan =

Indian mountain

Coordinates: 31°15′N 78°03′E

Mount Indrasan is located at an altitude of 6221 metres above sea level in Kullu district, Himachal Pradesh. Mt. Indrasan is considered as the most difficult mountain to climb in the Pir Panjal range of the Himalayas because of the challenges involved in scaling it. It was first climbed on October 13, 1962, by an expedition organized by Kyoto University Alpine Club, Kyoto, Japan.

It is also believed that whenever Lord Indra arrives on earth he resides here. Indrasan (composed of two words: Indra and Aasana) i.e. the royal seat of the Lord Indra.
