= S. Mahadeva =

S. Mahadeva FICE MIWE FISE MRSanE
- Born: 5 May 1893
- Died: ?
- Occupation: Civil engineer
- Spouse: Meenambi Ammai
- Children: Nadarah

Suppiramaniam Mahadeva (5 May 1893 – ?) was a leading Ceylon Tamil civil engineer and Director of the Public Works Department in Ceylon.

== Early life ==
Mahadeva was born on 5 May 1893. He was the son of Suppiramaniamam, a leading resident from Manipay.

Mahadeva married Meenambi Ammai, daughter of Chelliah Pillai. They had one son - Nadarah.

== Career ==
After leaving school Mahadeva joined the Public Works Department (PWD) in 1910 as a draughtsman. Two years later he moved to the PWD's Technical Services department. In 1920, after gaining suitable qualifications, he was promoted to an Inspector. Successive promotions saw him being appointed District Engineer in 1924, Engineering Assistant to the Director in 1930 and Chief Engineer (Designs) also in 1930. He was involved in many of the significant engineering projects of the period. He was also placed in charge of the newly created Water Works Branch of the PWD.

Mahadeva was appointed Assistant Director of the PWD in 1944. In 1945 he was appointed Director, a post he held until retirement.
