= Kamrunag Lake =

Lake in Himachal Pradesh, India

Coordinates: 31°28′23″N 77°03′00″E

Kamrunag Lake is located in the Mandi district of Himachal Pradesh, India. It is situated at 3,334 m (10,938 ft) above sea level in D.P.F. Kamrunag which is between the Mandi State and the Suket State . To reach the lake there is an on-foot route from Rohanda to Kamrunag which takes about 3–4 hours and is about 6 km (3.7 mi) on steep mountain terrain and there is one other way via Chail-Chowk which takes about 2-3 hours from Mandi.

In July 2020, The Himachal Pradesh State Biodiversity Board announced that the lake and the surrounding area would be recognized as a Biodiversity Heritage Site. There are many medicinal plants, special trees and exotic animal and plant species in the area around the lake which will be protected once it has been declared a Biodiversity Heritage Site.

== Etymology ==
The lake has its name because of a story from Mahabharata. It is said that Barbarika, the son of Ghatotkacha and Ahilawati, wanted to fight in the war and asked for permission from his mother. His mother then told him to fight for the side which was losing the war. Lord Krishna, after hearing about this, went to Barbarika to test him, as he already knew that the Kaurava side was going to lose the war in the end. Krishna took the form of a Brahman and challenged him to pierce all the leaves of a nearby Peepal tree. As Barbarika took out an arrow to shoot, Lord Krishna stepped on a leaf and kept it under his foot. After the arrow pierced all the leaves on the tree, it turned to pierce the last one which was under Lord Krishna's foot. He quickly stepped away from it and the arrow pierced the leaf. After this, Lord Krishna devised a plan: he asked for alms from Barbarika and made him promise to give anything he asked for. After he made the promise, Lord Krishna returned to his original form and asked Barbarika his head. Barbarika agreed to this and asked Lord Krishna for one request, which was to let him watch the Mahabharata. Lord Krishna took his head to the battlefield and let him watch the battle. After the battle was over Lord Krishna blessed him that he will be worshipped as Khatu Shyam and his body will be worshipped as Kamru.
