= Himachali =

Himachali may refer to:

- the people and culture of the Indian state of Himachal Pradesh
  - Himachali arts and crafts
    - Himachali cap
  - Himachali music
  - Himachali traditional dances
  - Himachali Muslims, an ethnocultural group of Muslims primarily in Sirmaur and Chamba districts
- Himachali languages, the Indo-Aryan languages spoken in the state
  - Mandeali, also known as Himachali, spoken in the Mandi district of the state
