= Himachali cap =

Traditional headdress

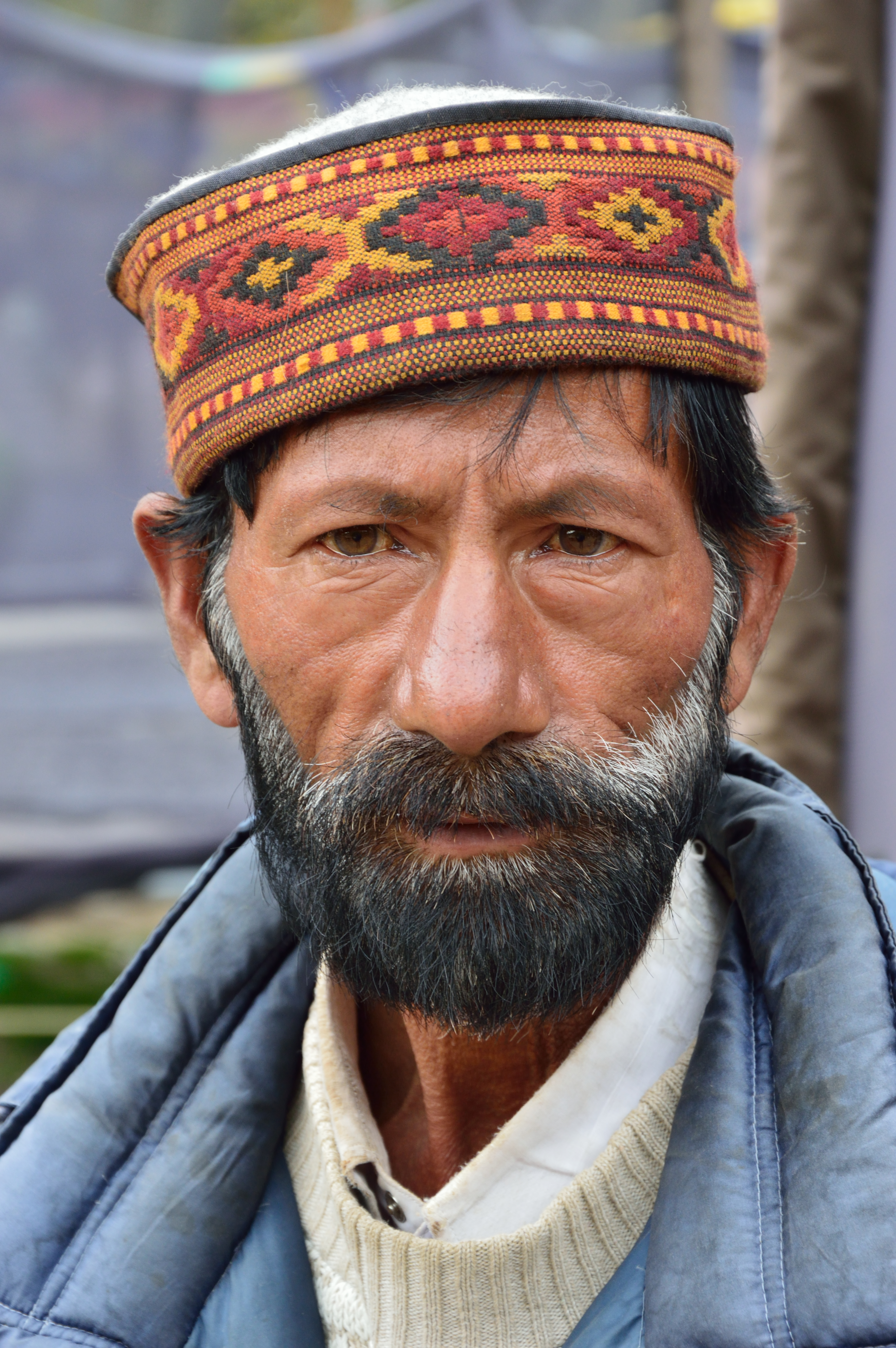
A man in Kullu, wearing a traditional Himachali cap.

Himachali cap (Bushehri topi, Pahari topi, Kinnauri topi) is a distinctive headdress associated with Himachal Pradesh's culture. It is a part of the traditional dress of many Pahari inhabitants.

== History ==
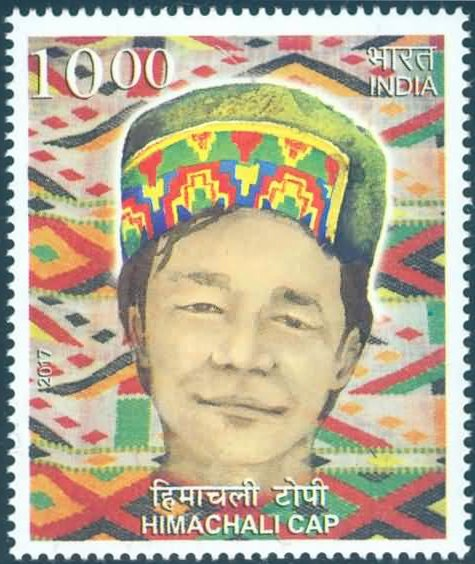
2017 Indian stamp depicting the cap

The Himachali cap is historically related to Kinnaur that was formerly part of the Bushahr Kingdom. It reached other parts of Himachal Pradesh via the princely state of Bushahr and Kullu, since Bushahr kingdom traded with many neighboring regions Including Tibet. The weaving style and materials used for these caps differ from each other. Kinnaur's traditional cap also called Thepang, feature two distinct velvet variations: Maroon and green.

== Material and Shape ==
Himachali caps are one of the popular arts and crafts of Himachal Pradesh. The Himachali cap is usually made of wool, and the shape is typically round or boat shape.

== Traditional wear ==
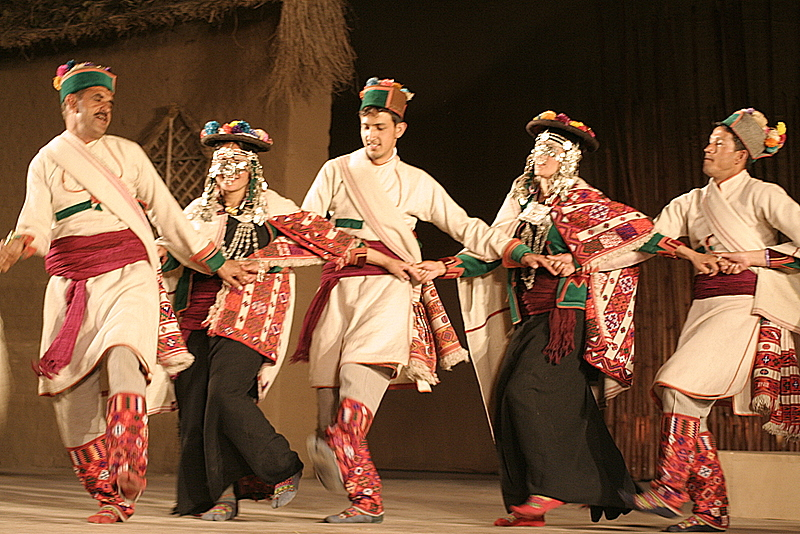
Nati dance being performed with traditional Kinnauri attire

The Himachali cap is an ingrained part of daily wear in Himachal, and it is commonly worn during local festivities, religious functions and marriages. Himachali caps are a representation of cultural identity. People in Himachal consider the cap as a point of pride, like a turban for Sikhs in Punjab. This topi (Hindi for cap) is a representation of HP’s cultural identity and is considered a symbol of pride for the Himachalis.

=== Political identity ===
I would like to thank Narendra Modi ji for using Himachal’s cap as a crown in Israel

— Prem Kumar Dhumal tweeted for Narendra Modi when he dressed in Himachali cap with a maroon band during his visit to Israel.

The colour of the Himachali caps has been an indicator of political loyalties in the hill state for a long period of time with Congress party leaders like Virbhadra Singh donning caps with green band and the rival BJP leader Prem Kumar Dhumal wearing a cap with maroon band.

== Gallery ==
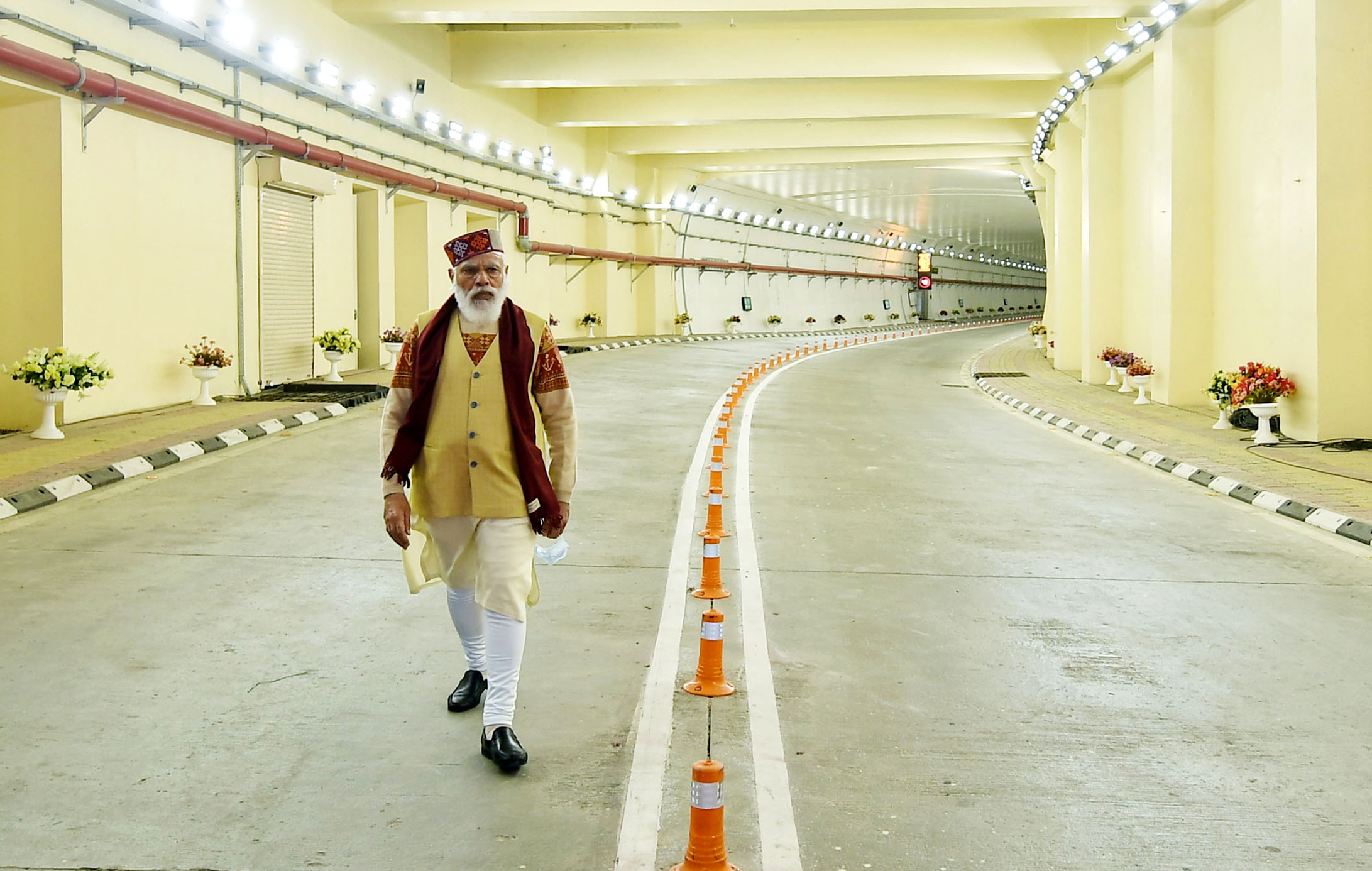
Narendra Modi in Himachali cap

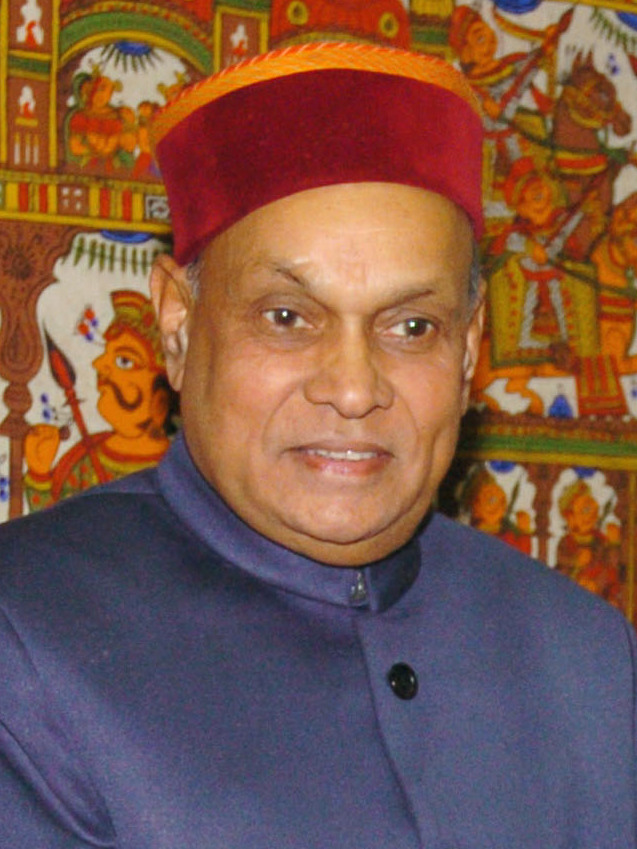
Prem Kumar Dhumal in Himachali cap.

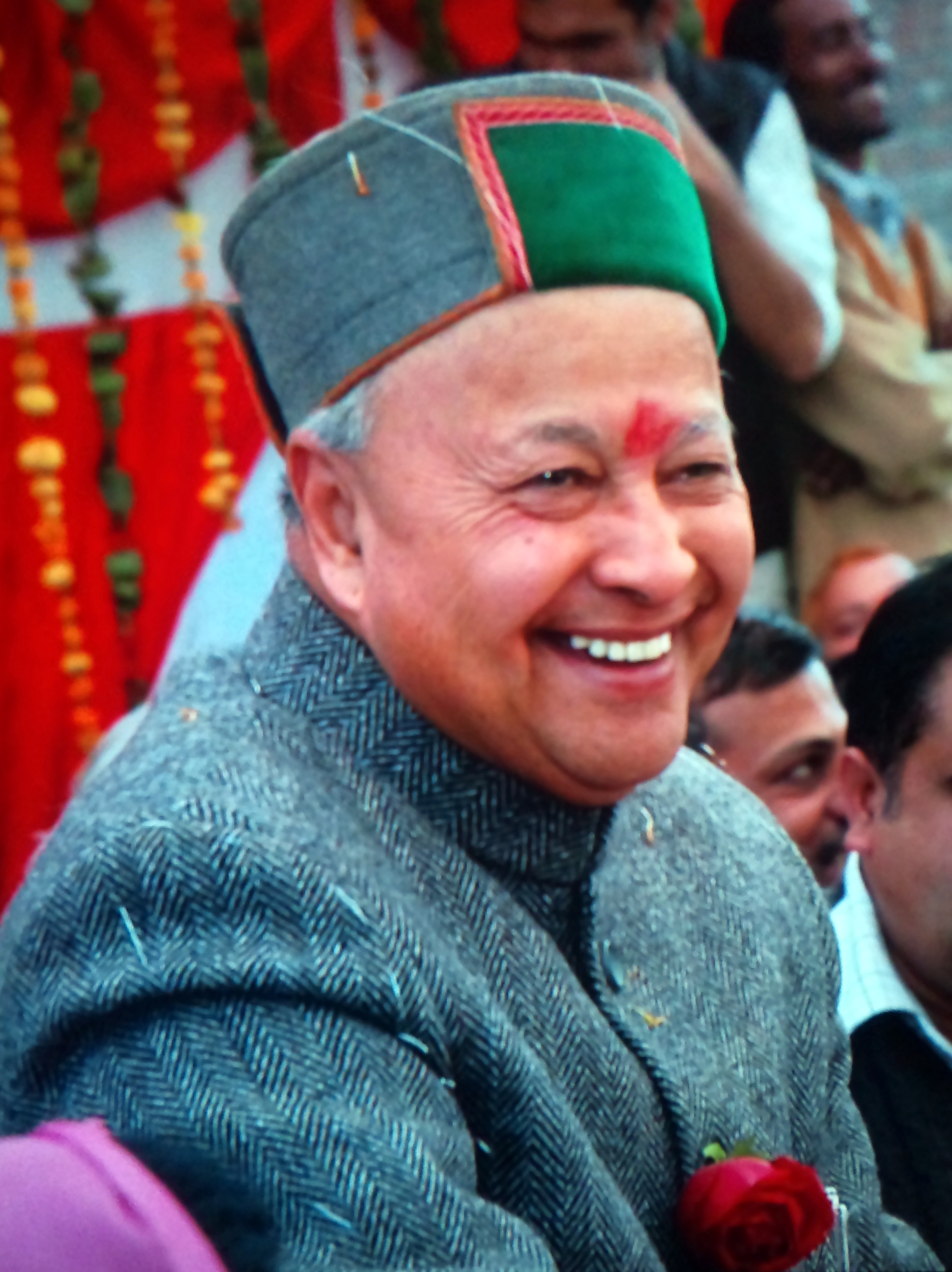
Virbhadra Singh in Himachali cap.

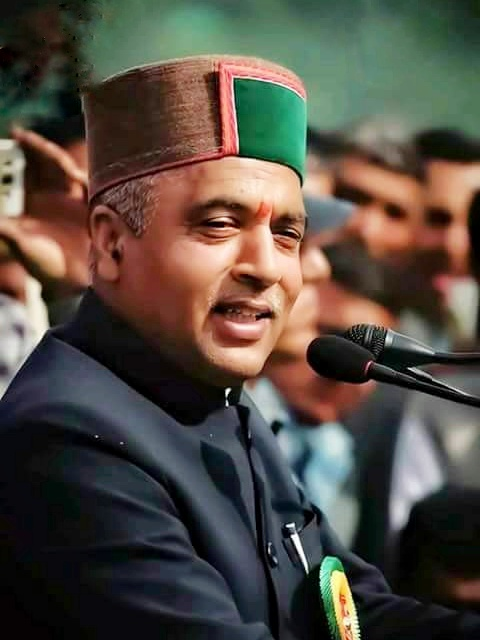
Jai Ram Thakur in Himachali cap.

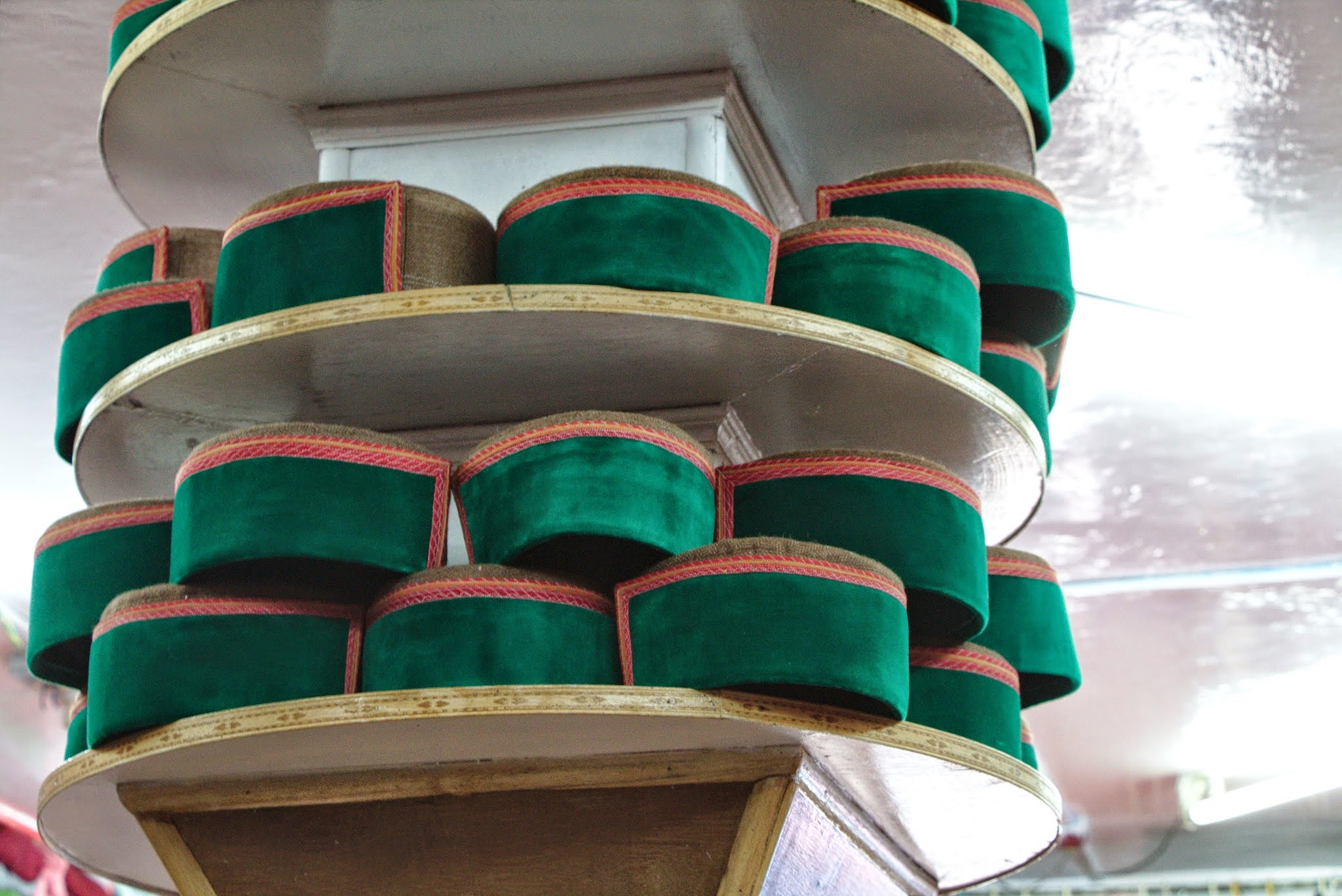
Himachali Caps

== See also ==
- List of hat styles
- Himachal Pradesh
- Rampur chaddar
