= No Means No Movement =

No Means No Movement may refer to:

- "No means no", a slogan used to raise awareness of issues concerning sexual consent
- No Means No Movement (Kinnaur), an environmental movement in India to stop the building of dams

== See also ==
- No Means No (disambiguation)
