= No Means No Movement (Kinnaur) =

Environmental protest in India

The No Means No Movement is a grassroots environmental protest movement in Kinnaur, Himachal Pradesh, India that began in 2021. Local tribal communities are at the forefront of opposition to the increasing number of hydroelectric power projects in the area. This movement stems from a series of recent landslides and growing concern about environmental degradation and geologic instability in the Sutlej River watershed.

== Background ==
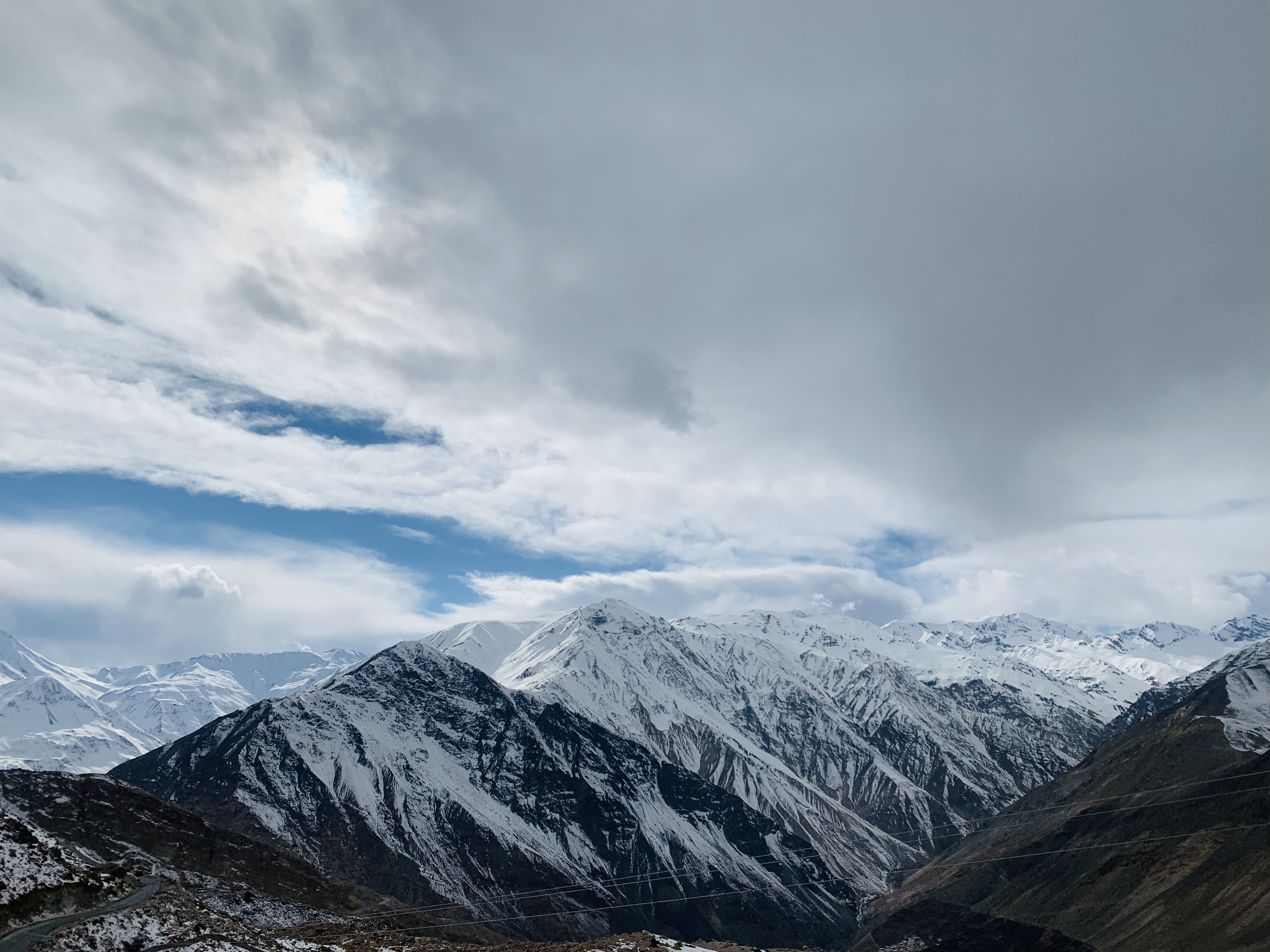
Kinnaur

Kinnaur, a tribal district in Himachal Pradesh, is situated in the Western Himalayan belt. Its economy is largely dependent on agriculture, horticulture, and forest-based livelihoods, as well as on the growing environmental impacts of increased hydropower development in the Sutlej River basin since 2001. Studies have identified factors contributing to increased ecological pressure, including landslides and soil erosion driven by both natural factors and infrastructure-related activities, such as tunneling and road construction.

=== Immediate cause ===
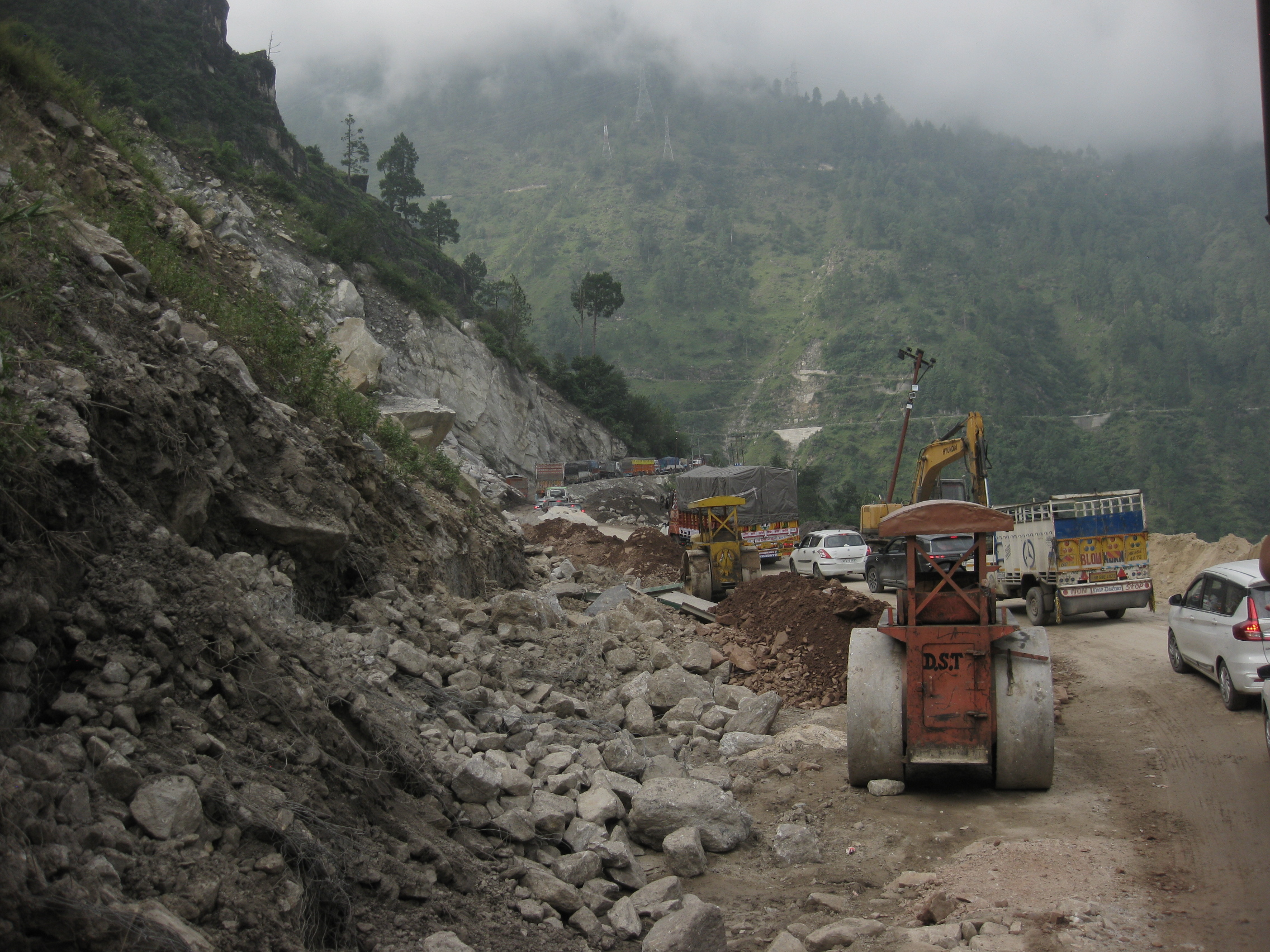

The immediate cause of this social movement is two landslides that occurred in 2021. These include the Batseri landslide on July 21, 2021, and the Nigulsari landslide on August 11, 2021. As a result of the Batseri landslide, fatalities occurred when rockfalls struck a road, and 9 people died, and 2 were injured. The Nigulsari landslide also included 28 or more fatalities, where the boulders hit the Government bus of Himachal, and another 8 people were found dead in an SUV, further disrupting activities in the area by adding to concerns among tribal communities regarding geologic instability in this area.

== Movement ==
Following the landslides that occurred in Kinnaur in 2021, residents organized protests and awareness campaigns against the current (and planned) Jangi-Thopan Powari Hydro Electric Power Plant in the region. The movement is described as a transition from collective trauma resulting from past disaster events to collective action in the form of organized resistance. Studies have also illustrated how, for many Kinnaur tribal people, their everyday experiences of environmental change and frequent interruptions to their daily lives were major factors in the emergence of such collective action. The movement involved Kinnaur tribal communities who supported the environment and their livelihoods and participated in decision-making about local developments that affect them as members. The group's slogan, "No Means No", expressed its refusal to allow any further hydroelectric power projects.

== Activities ==
Kinnaur youth involvement in the movement led to the use of informal, volunteer-based platforms to voice their opinions through graffiti, visual messages, and locally based initiatives like Kyang, which provide an outlet for artwork, stories, and information on regional environmental issues. As well as providing a platform for the voice of Kinnauri youth, the movement also served as a basis for political action during the 2022 election of members of parliament for Himachal Pradesh. In this election, local tribal groups asked political candidates for guarantees that they would oppose the construction of new hydropower schemes, while hydropower was one of several key issues in some areas of Kinnaur that influenced voting decisions.

== Impact ==
Due to local resistance in Kinnaur, the Jangi Thopan Powari hydro project faced delays and was put on hold in 2021. Further, in 2023, the Himachal Government canceled the project's allotment to SJVN, and the project remains on hold.
