= SJVN =

Indian power generation company

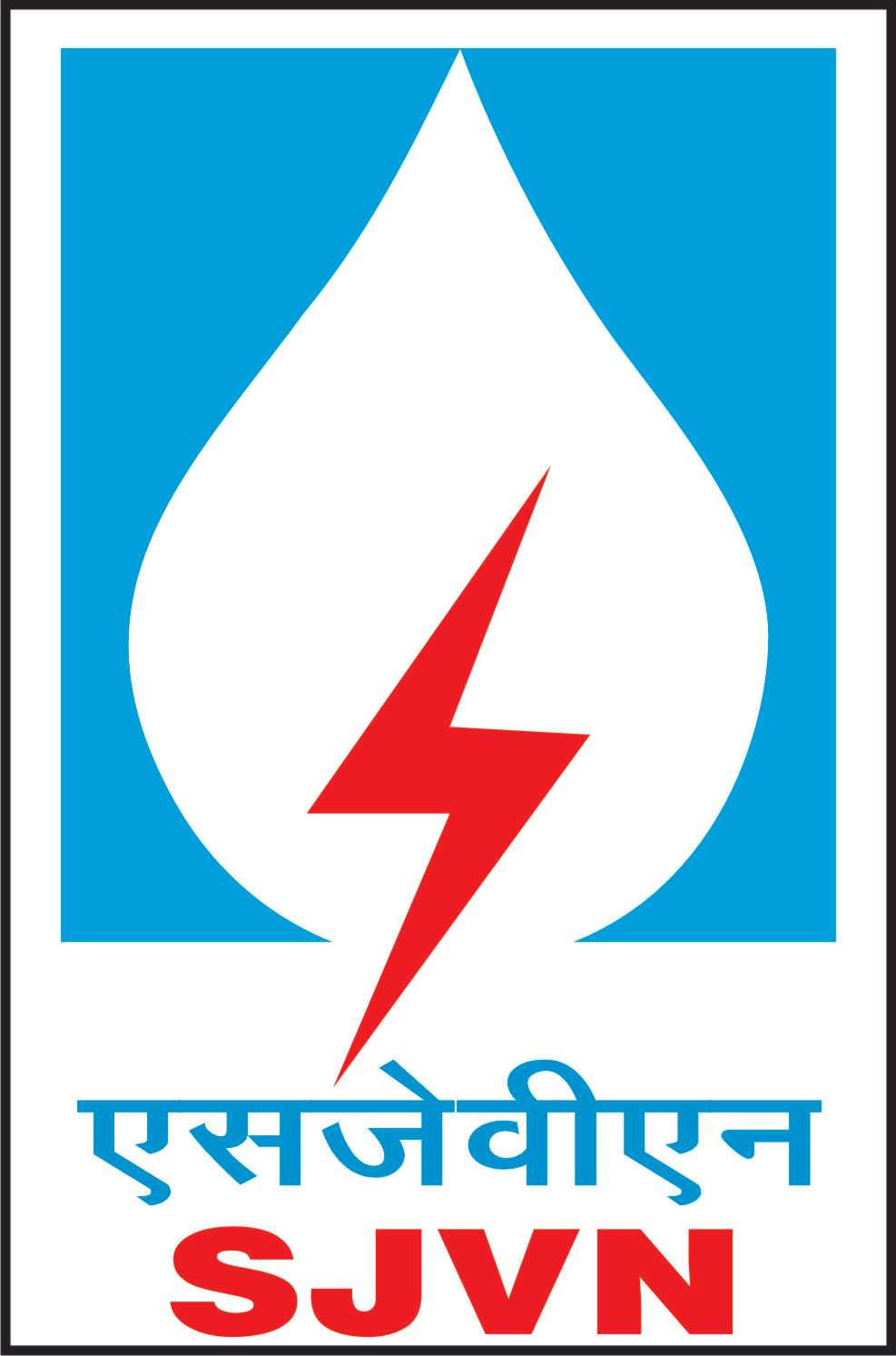
- Type: Public
- Traded as: NSE: SJVN; BSE: 533206
- Industry: Hydroelectric power
- Founded: 1988
- Headquarters: Shimla, Himachal Pradesh, India
- Key people: Bhupendra Gupta (Chairman & MD); Rajendra Prasad Goyal Director (Finance)
- Owner: Government of India (59.92%); Government of Himachal Pradesh (26.85%)
- Website: sjvn.nic.in

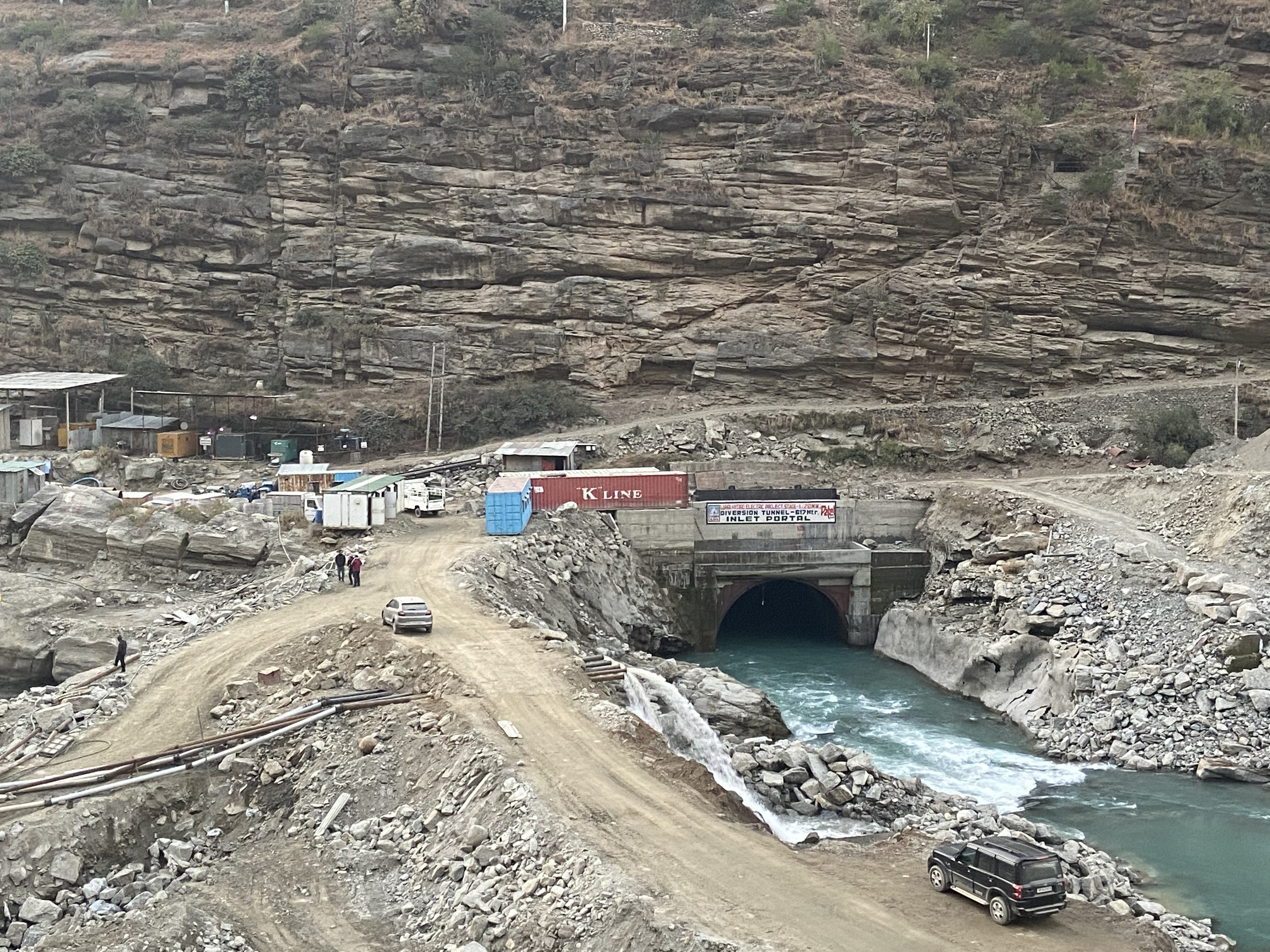

SJVN, formerly known as Satluj Jal Vidyut Nigam, is an Indian public sector undertaking in the Navaratna Category and involved in hydroelectric power generation and transmission. It was incorporated in 1988 as Nathpa Jhakri Power Corporation, a joint venture between the Government of India and the Government of Himachal Pradesh. The company has a total operating hydropower capacity of 1972 MW through its three hydropower plants—Nathpa Jhakri and Rampur and Naitwar Mori. In addition, it has an installed capacity of 97.6 MW of wind power and 396.9 MW of solar power.

Beginning with a single project and single state operation, India’s largest 1500 MW Nathpa Jhakri Hydro Power Station in Himachal Pradesh, the company has commissioned twelve generation projects totaling 2466.5 MW of installed capacity and 86 km 400 KV Transmission Line. SJVN is presently implementing or operating power projects in Himachal Pradesh, Uttarakhand, Bihar, Maharashtra, Uttar Pradesh, Punjab, Gujarat, Arunachal Pradesh, Rajasthan, Assam, Odisha, Mizoram and Madhya Pradesh in India.

Apart from India, SJVN also has under-construction hydroelectric projects in Nepal and Bhutan.

== Subsidiaries ==
1. SJVN Arun-3 Power Development Company Pvt Ltd (SAPDC)
2. SJVN Thermal Private Limited (STPL)
3. SJVN Green Energy Limited (SGEL)

== Joint ventures ==
1. Cross Border Power Transmission Company Limited (CPTC)

== Operations ==
Sr No	Power Projects	State	Capacity (MW)
1	Nathpa Jhakri Hydro Power Station	Himachal Pradesh	1500
2	Rampur Hydro Power Station	Himachal Pradesh	412
3	Parasan Solar Power Project	Uttar Pradesh	75
4	Charanka Solar Power Project	Gujarat	5.6
5	Sadla Wind Power Project	Gujarat	50
6	Khirvire Wind Power Project	Maharashtra	47.6
7	Solar Power Plant at Nathpa Jhakri	Himachal Pradesh	1.310
8	Naitwar Mori Hydro Power Station	Uttarkashi Uttarakhand	60
9	Dhaulasidh Hydro Electric Project	Hamirpur, Himachal Pradesh	66

== See also ==
- NHPC
- Hydroelectric power in Himachal Pradesh
