= Lavi Fair =

Fair in Himachal Pradesh, India

International Lavi Fair Lavi Mela
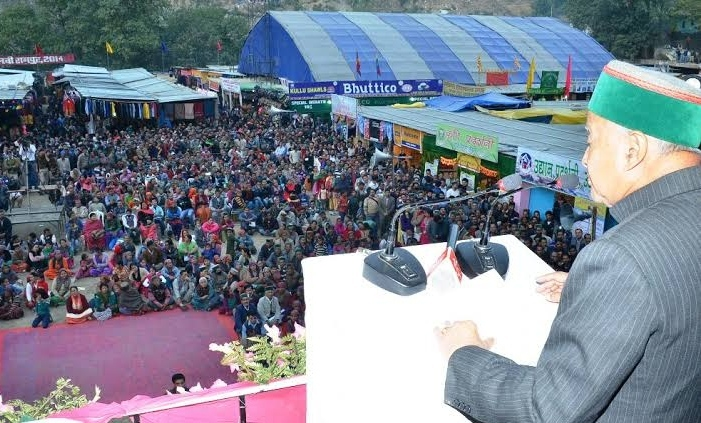
- CM Virbhadra Singh's address at Paat Bungalow during Lavi Mela

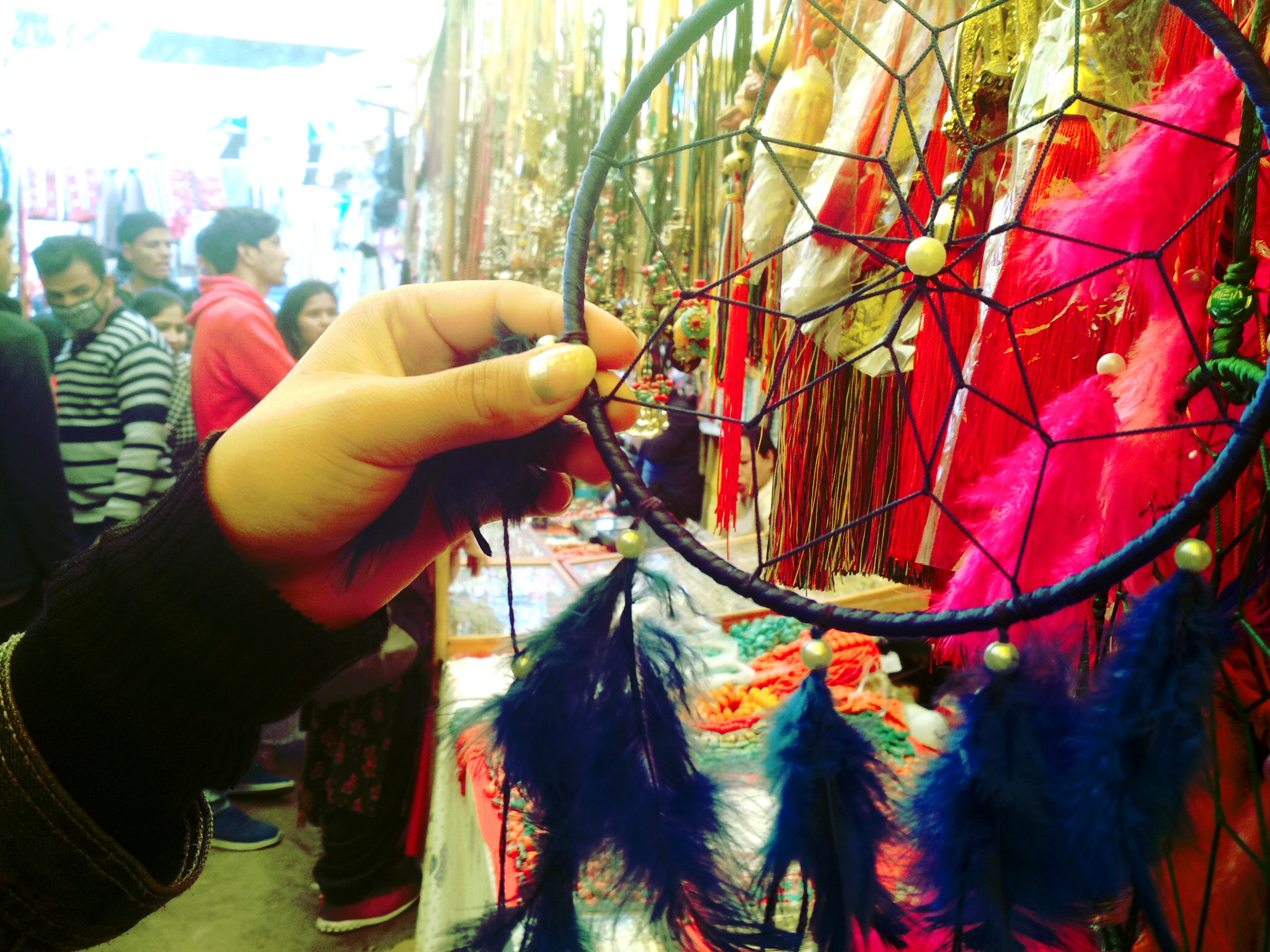
- A Kinnauri Market view from Lavi Fair
- Status: Active
- Genre: Trade Fair, Night Functions
- Begins: 11 November
- Ends: 14 November
- Frequency: Annually
- Venue: PGSS Boys' School, Rampur Bushahr (Night Function); Part Bungalow, Rampur Bushahr (Main Traders); Alongside NH 05 (Small Traders)
- Location: Rampur Bushahr
- Coordinates: 31°27′0″N 77°37′59″E
- Country: India
- Years active: 17th Century Onwards
- Founders: Trade treaty between Bushahr and Tibet
- Previous event: 11 November 2025
- Next event: 11 November 2026
- Participants: Tourist, Traders, Sellers, Shoppers, Local people
- Attendance: From all over the globe
- Organiser: International Lavi Fair Organising Committee
- Member: Chairperson (DC, Shimla); Vice-Chairperson (SDM, Rampur Bushahr)
- Sponsor: Government of Himachal Pradesh

The Lavi Fair or Lavi Mela, officially known as International Lavi Fair, is fundamentally a trade fair held at Rampur Bushahr in Shimla district of Himachal Pradesh. The main attraction is the cultural night function starts from 11 to 14 November in PGSS Boys' School. While the trade fair runs throughout November in Part Bungalow. This fair is the outcome of signing of the trade treaty between the erstwhile Bushahr state and Tibet in the end of the 17th century (1679-1684).

Historically, it is an important commercial fair and is attended by tourists from all over the world. It is the most significant trade and commercial fair (Mela) of Shimla as well as of Himachal Pradesh.

== Etymology ==
The word Lavi is derived from the word Loe which means "a sheet of woolen cloth". Another meaning of Lavi is "shearing of the sheep". These word meaning clearly indicates the trade of something woolen or sheep.

== History ==
Lavi once served as a major trading centre and the stopover point on the old trade routes that led to Kinnaur, Tibet, Ladakh and Afghanistan. The fair that takes place there also finds a mention in the records of the erstwhile state of Bushahr.

The Lavi fair started after trading treaty between the Hindu Raja of Bushahr, Kehri Singh (1639-1696), and the government of (Tibet) Lhasa (dGa' ldan pho brang) headed by Bio bzang rgya mtsho, the Fifth Dalai Lama (1617-1682). Historical ties between Tibet and Bushahr go back to at least the 17th century, when the princely ruler of Bushahr, Kehri Singh, sided in 1679 with the Mongol commander dGa' ldan tshe dbang on a Tibetan-Mongol punitive expedition against the Kingdom of Ladakh. The result of their mutual cooperation during the war was a sworn agreement stipulating that no taxes be levied on Bushahri and Tibetan merchants when trading on each others' territories, an official delegation from Bushahr should be sent tri-annually to the towns of Tsaparang, Purang, Dawa, Ruthog and Gartok in western Tibet.

For the small Himalayan state of Bushahr, the Tibet-Bashahr treaty of 1679-1684 was undoubtedly of great economic importance. Historical documents, testify that tax-free commerce between Tibetans and Bushaharis should be observed in perpetuity. Similarly, the Kinnauri oral tradition preserves the formulaic expression that the treaty was meant to last until the "Sutlej goes dry, crows become white, horses get horns, and stones - stated to be at the borders of both the States and on which the treaty was written - produce hair or wool".

Concerning the origins of Lavi Fair of Rampur Bushahr, the Census of India (1961) reports:

About three hundred years ago during the regime of Raja Kehar Singh of Bushahr, a trade treaty was signed between the Bushahr State and Tibet ... Horses from Tibet and swords from Bushahr were exchanged in token of this friendship. It was written in the treaty that their friendly relations would continue till this time ... Since then, it is presumed that trade relations increased and eventually [The] Lavi fair was held.

— Census of India (1961)

In earlier time, traders from Tibet, Afghanistan and Uzbekistan used to do business at the International Lavi Fair. They used to come here especially with horses including dry fruit, wool, pashmin and sheep. In return, traders used to take salt, jaggery and other rations from Rampur. This salt was brought from Gumma in Mandi district. Chaumukhi (also called Chamurthy) horses were also traded at the Lavi Fair.
