= Govt. PG College Rampur Bushahr =

Government College in Himachal Pradesh, India

Coordinates: 31.4550436°N 77.6409424°E

G. B. Pant Memorial Government PG College
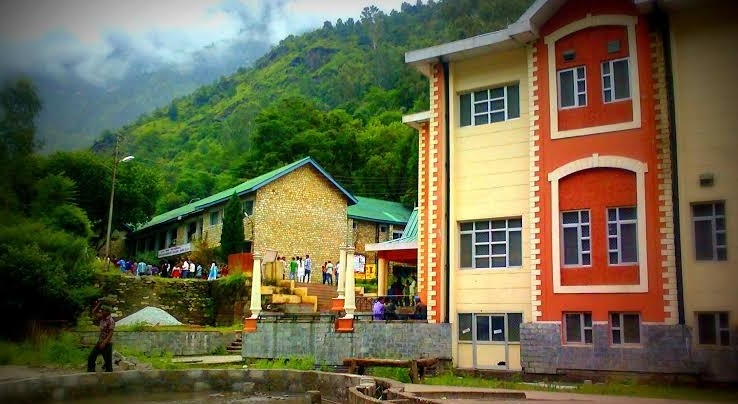
- Auditorium view
- Other names: GDC Rampur Bushahr; GB Pant Memorial Govt. Degree College Rampur Bushahr
- Motto: सा विद्या या विमुक्तये
- Motto in English: Knowledge is one that liberates
- Type: Public
- Established: 11 November 1959; 66 years ago
- Affiliations: UGC, NAAC
- Academic affiliations: Himachal Pradesh University
- Principal: Dr. Pankaj Basotia
- Faculty: 46
- Students: 4993
- Location: Rampur Bushahr, Himachal Pradesh, India
- Campus: Urban
- Website: gcrampur.nic.in
- Accredited with 'A' grade by NAAC in 2016.

Govt. PG College Rampur Bushahr known as Govind Ballabh Pant Memorial Government PG College Rampur Bushahr is a government degree college at Part Bungalow in the town Rampur Bushahr. College is affiliated with HPU. It is established in 1959. It is situated at shore of Satluj river near NH 05 alongside of town. This college is the center for students of 4 districts.
