= Rampur chaddar =

Kind of handspun shawl

A Rampur chaddar (Rampur chadar) was a kind of handspun woolen shawl that originated in the town of Rampur in Himachal Pradesh, India, during the 19th century. They were later manufactured in cities of the Punjab such as Ludhiana and Amritsar, and also imported from outside India.

== Name ==
चद्दर, चादर, Chaddar, Chadar is a Hindi word that means sheet (a rectangular piece of cloth). Rampur chaddar was named after the Rampur Bushahr.

== Material ==
There were at one time 2000 shawl weavers and 500 wool manufacturers in Rampur. They used to obtain the wool from Bushahr.

=== Texture ===
The texture was fine yet warm. Rampur chaddars were made with wool or wool warp and silk or cotton in the weft. Though the quality was fine, soft, and durable, it was not equal to Pashmina.

==== Use ====
Rampur chaddars were liked as wrap or shawl and were sold throughout India. They became popular in the late 19th century as a result of the import of power-loom woven examples sold as being of Indian manufacture.

== See also ==
- Puttoo
