= Rampur Bushahr =

Town in Himachal Pradesh, India

- Town
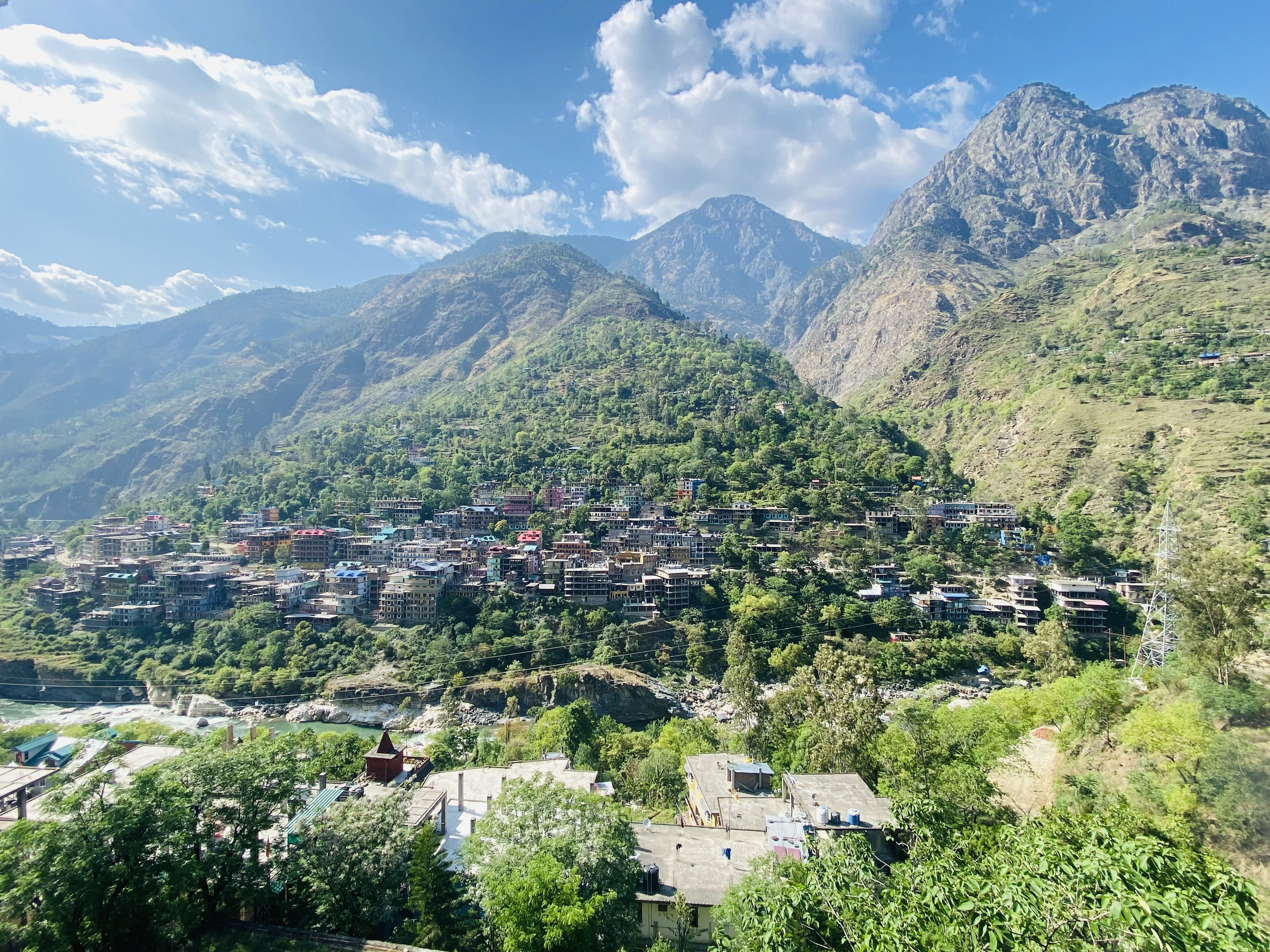
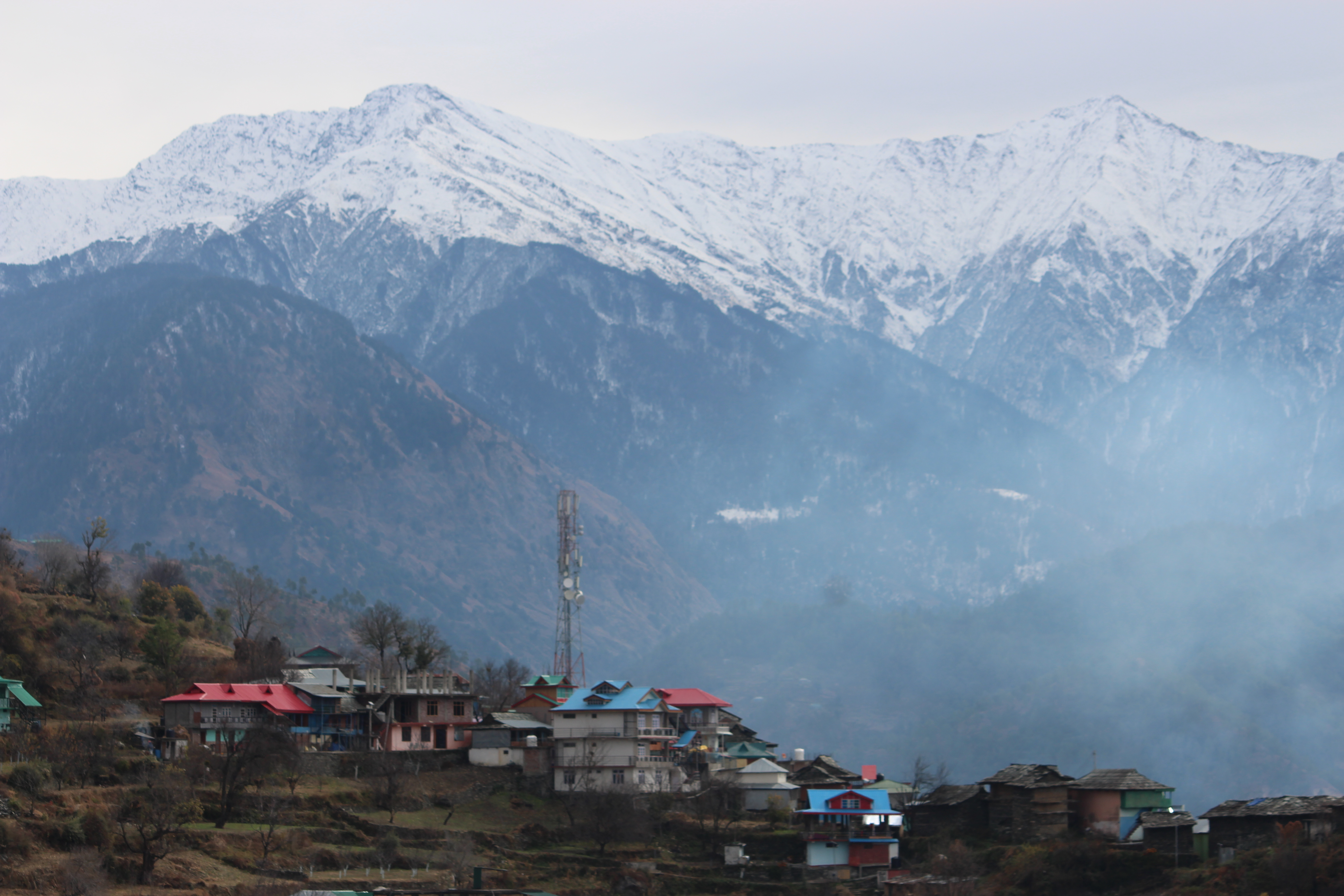
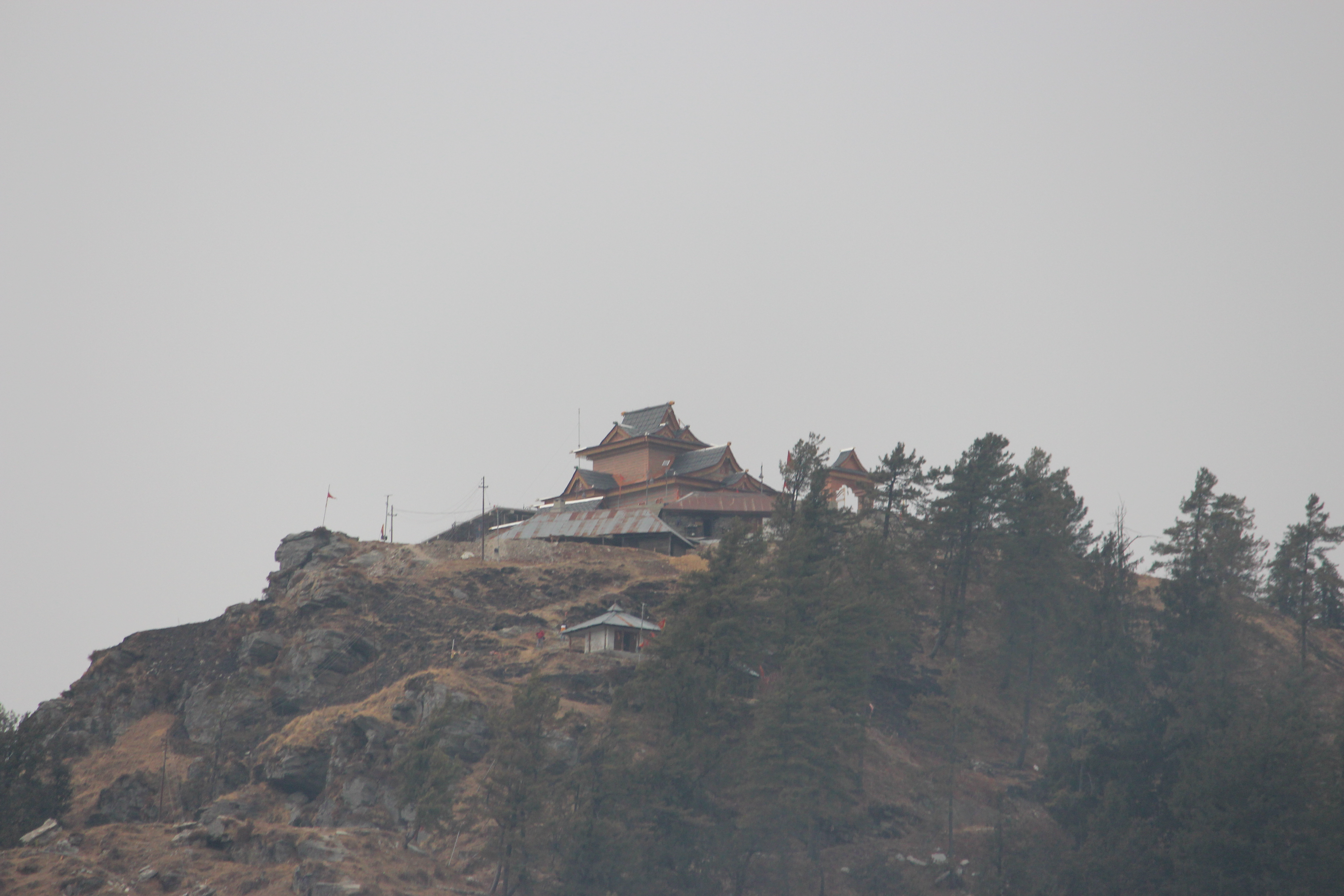
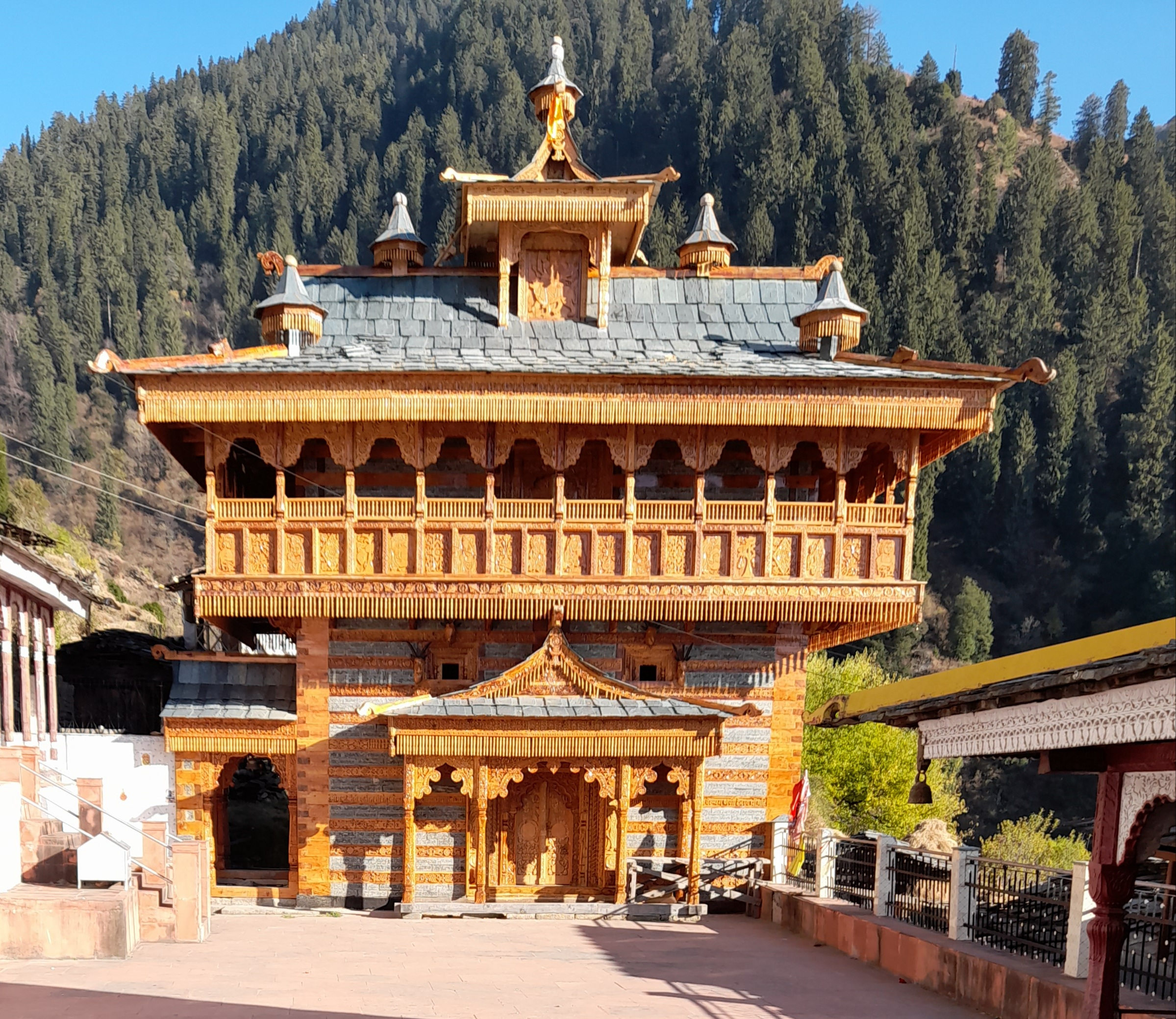
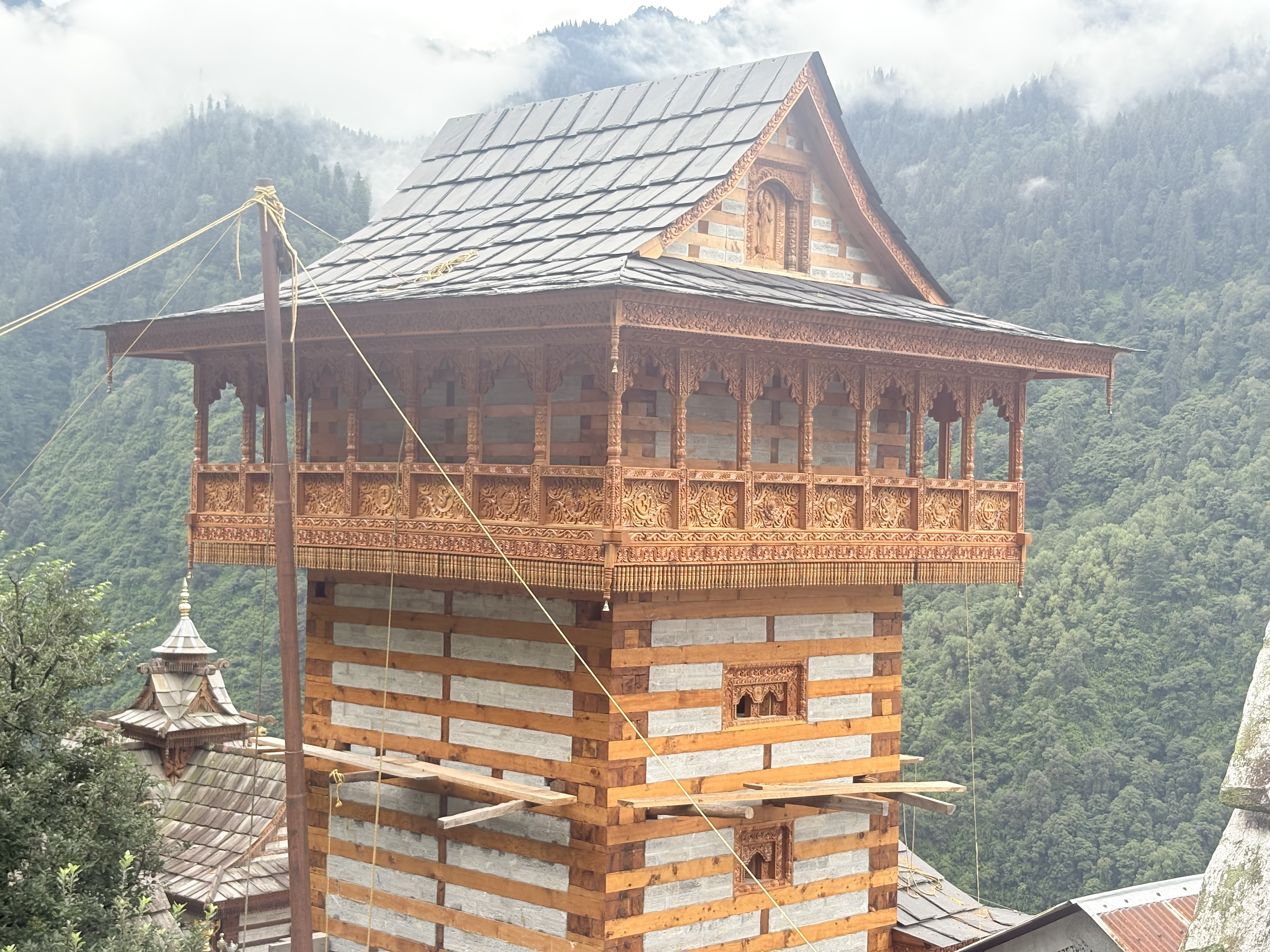
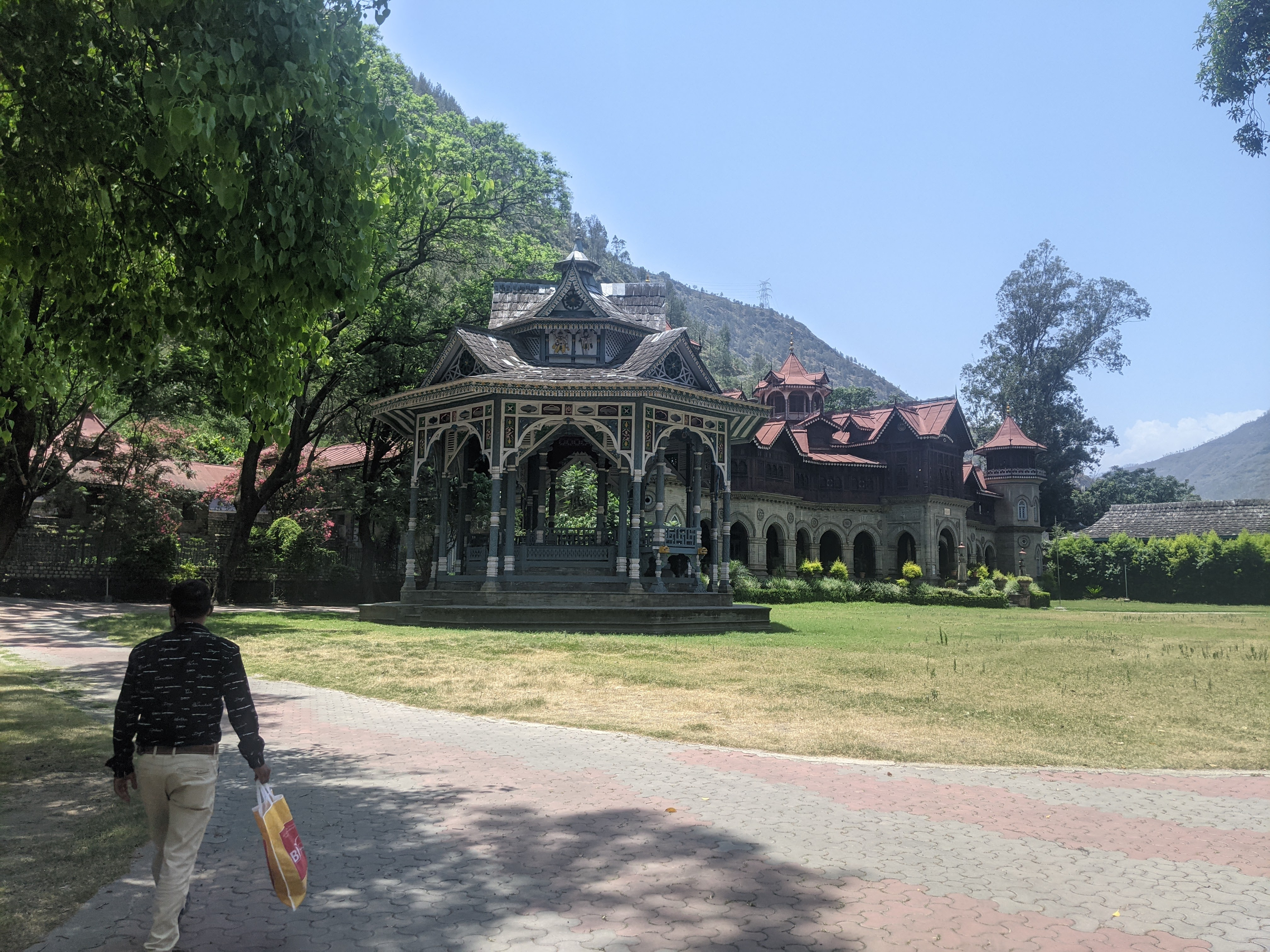
- From top, left to right: Rampur Bushahr town on the bank of Satluj river, View of Lalsa village, Shraikoti Temple on uphill, Devta Sahib Paanchveer Temple, Lakshmi Narayan Temple at Kinnu, Padam Palace

- Location in Himachal Pradesh, India Rampur Bushahr (India)
- Coordinates: 31°27′0″N 77°37′59″E
- Country: India
- State: Himachal Pradesh
- District: Shimla

Government
  - SDM: Nishant Tomar, HAS
- Elevation: 1,021 m (3,350 ft)

Population (2011)
  - Total: 5,655
  - Density: 2,719/km^{2} (7,040/sq mi)

Languages
  - Official: Hindi
  - Additional official: Sanskrit
  - Regional: Mahasui (Kochi)
- Time zone: UTC+5:30 (IST)
- PIN: 172001
- Vehicle registration: HP-06, HP-92

Rampur Bushahr is a town and a municipal council in Shimla district in the Indian state of Himachal Pradesh. It is situated on the bank of Satluj river. It is about 128 km from Shimla and is well connected with NH 5 which passes through Theog, Narkanda and Kumarsain.

== History ==
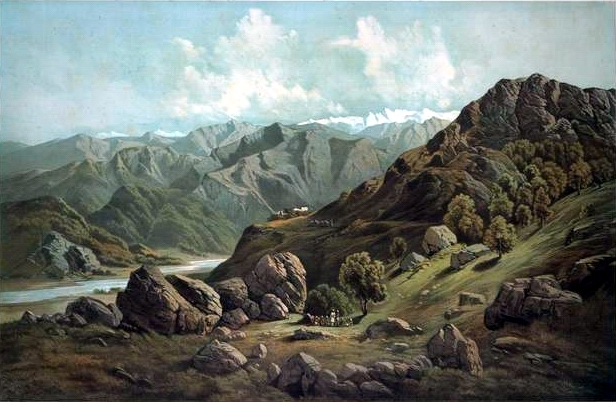
Satluj Valley from Rampur ca. 1857

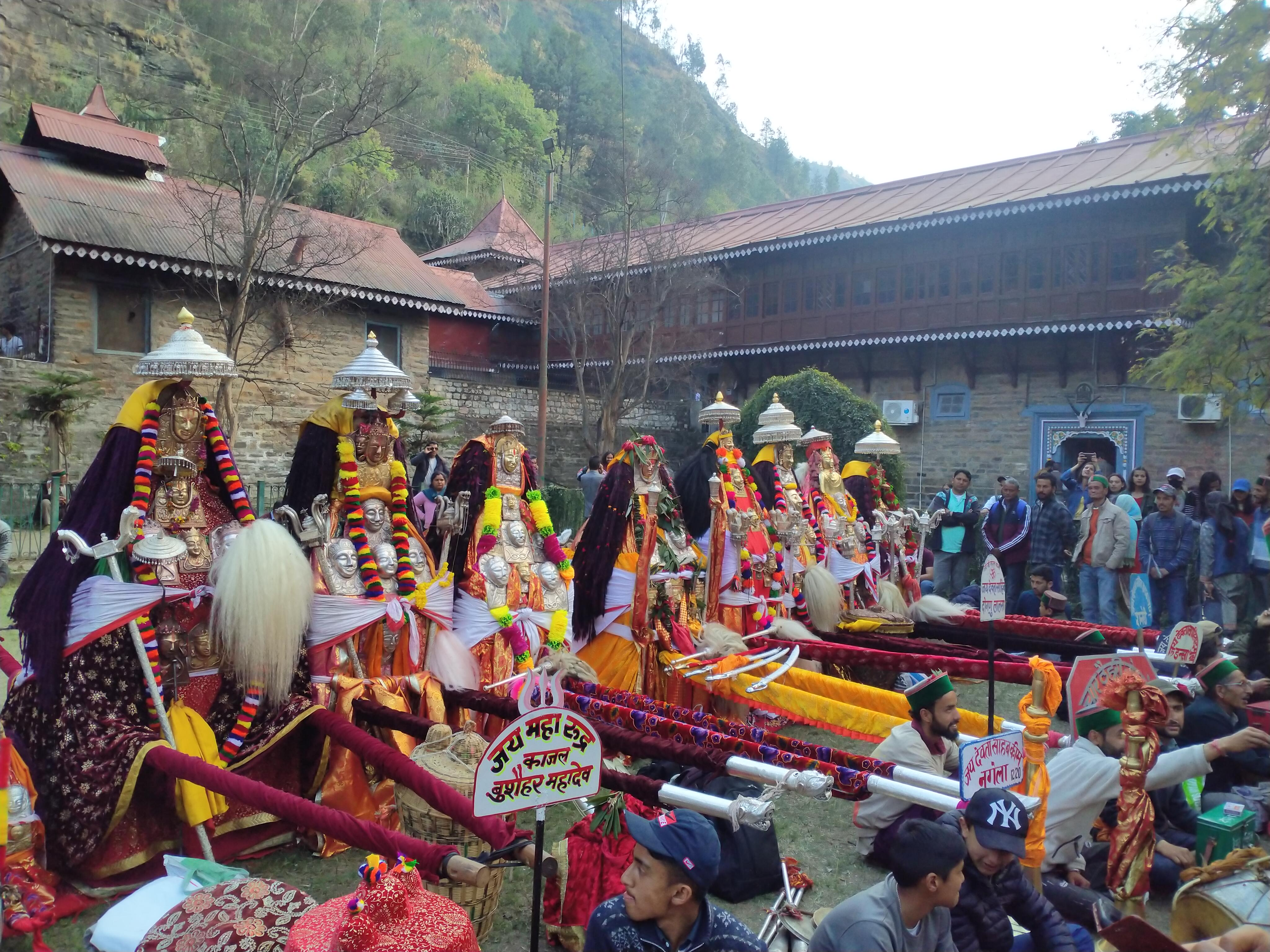
Faag Mela Rampur

The principality of Bushahr (also known as Bashahar, Bushahar, Bashahr) was once among the largest of the twenty-eight Shimla Hill States keen to invest on regional and transcontinental trade and exploit Himalayan resources. Caught in one of the British imperial enterprise, it was subjected to political-cum-economic vicissitudes, acceding to the Indian Union in 1947. On 8 March 1948, along with twenty other princely hill States of Punjab and Shimla, Bushahr signed an agreement which resulted in its inclusion in the Indian State of Himachal Pradesh.

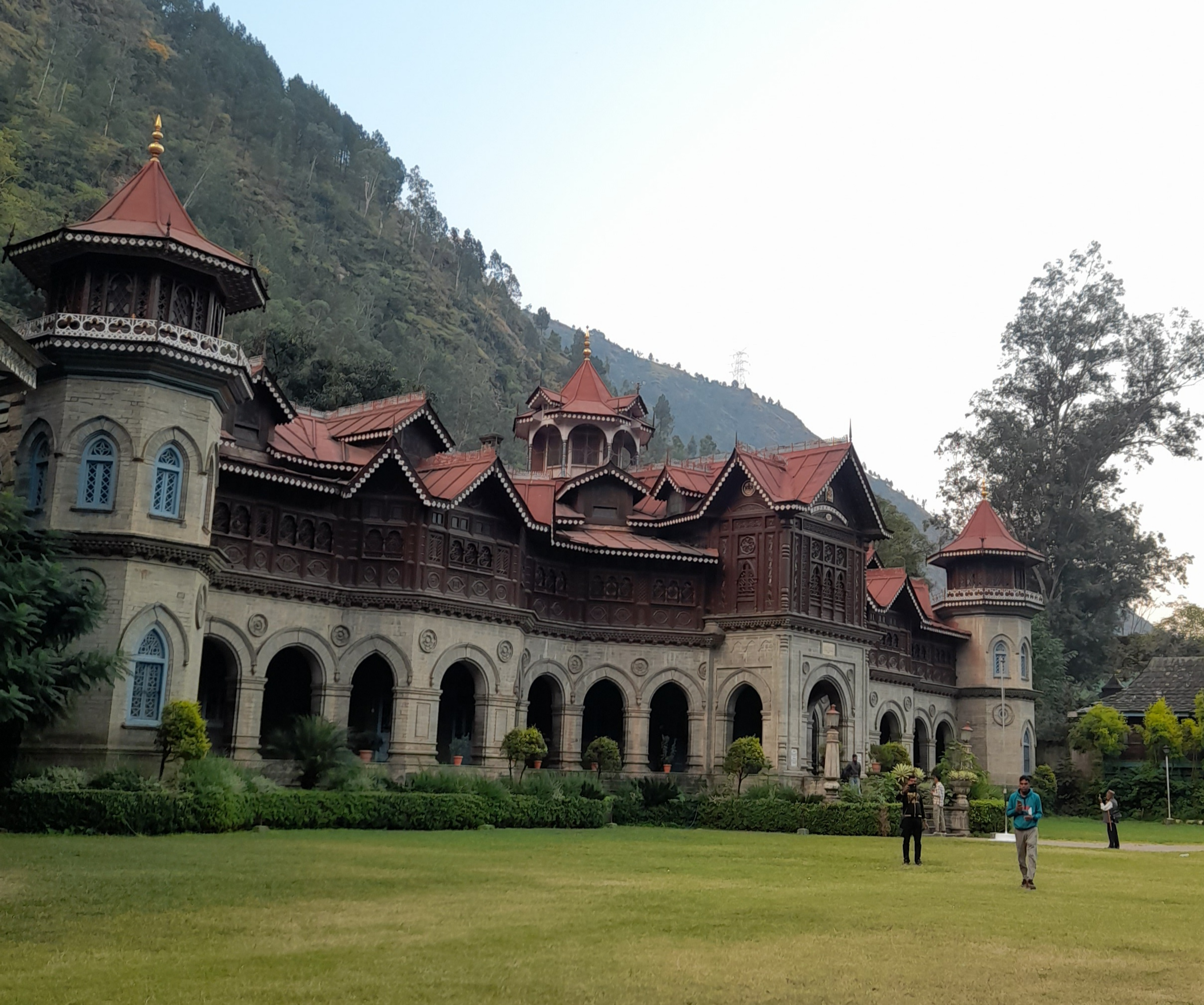
Padam Palace Rampur Bushahr

Rampur, a small township situated at 1,005 meters on the left bank of the Sutlej, served as Bushahar's winter capital. Being well connected with major trading routes that joined Indian markets with Central Asia and Tibet, it buzzed with mercantile activity, especially in November during the Lavi fair, the largest trading event in the north Himalayas attracting traders from Kashmir, Ladakh, Yarkant County, and the Indian mainland. Concerning the origins of the Rampuri fair, the 1951 census of India reports:

"About three hundred years ago during the regime of Raja Kehar Singh of Bushahr, a trade treaty was signed between the Bushahr State and Tibet…Horses from Tibet and swords from Bushahr were exchanged in token of this friendship. It was written in the treaty that their friendly relations would continue till this time…Since then, it is presumed that trade relations increased and eventually [the] Lavi fair was held."

Bushahr, located within this valley, became a crucial waypoint on the route to Tibet and Ladakh, The Bushahr rulers took advantage of organizing the seasonal Lavi fair to increase trade in their province. Significantly, Rampur became a major trading hub for Ti-betan wool and Indian items. It is believed by the locals that this fair was started in AD 1681 after the treaty between the Bushahr state and Tibet during the reign of Raja Kehri Singh of Bushahr. This fair not only reinforced the economic linkages between the interregional traders but also established Bushahr as a leading business hub in the region.

Rampur was also located along pilgrimage routes to sacred sites in western Tibet shared by Hindus, Bön and Buddhists alike, i.e., Mount Kailash and Lake Mansarovar. Missionary and pilgrimage activities, intensified by trading possibilities, created the conditions for Tibetan Buddhism to take a firm stronghold in these borderland regions. 22 km from the village of Namgya in upper Kinnaur, laid the Shipki La pass which linked caravan routes to and from western Tibet. This treacherous transcontinental passage must have been in use from ancient times, for among the ruined castles reported by Francke at Shipki La village, there were no living memories of the origins of mKar gog, the oldest of them built above the village in cyclopean style. Rampur also has Hydro Power Stations namely, Nathpa Jhakri Power Station (1500 MW) and Rampur Hydro Power Station (412 MW) by SJVN Ltd. A second castle, known as Seng ge mkhar, is said to have received its crooked ground plan “through a race round its base executed in opposite directions by a poisonous snake and a scorpion,” and was built, in all probability, during the Ladakhi occupation of mNga’ ris by orders of King Sengge Namgyal (1570–1642) and called after him.

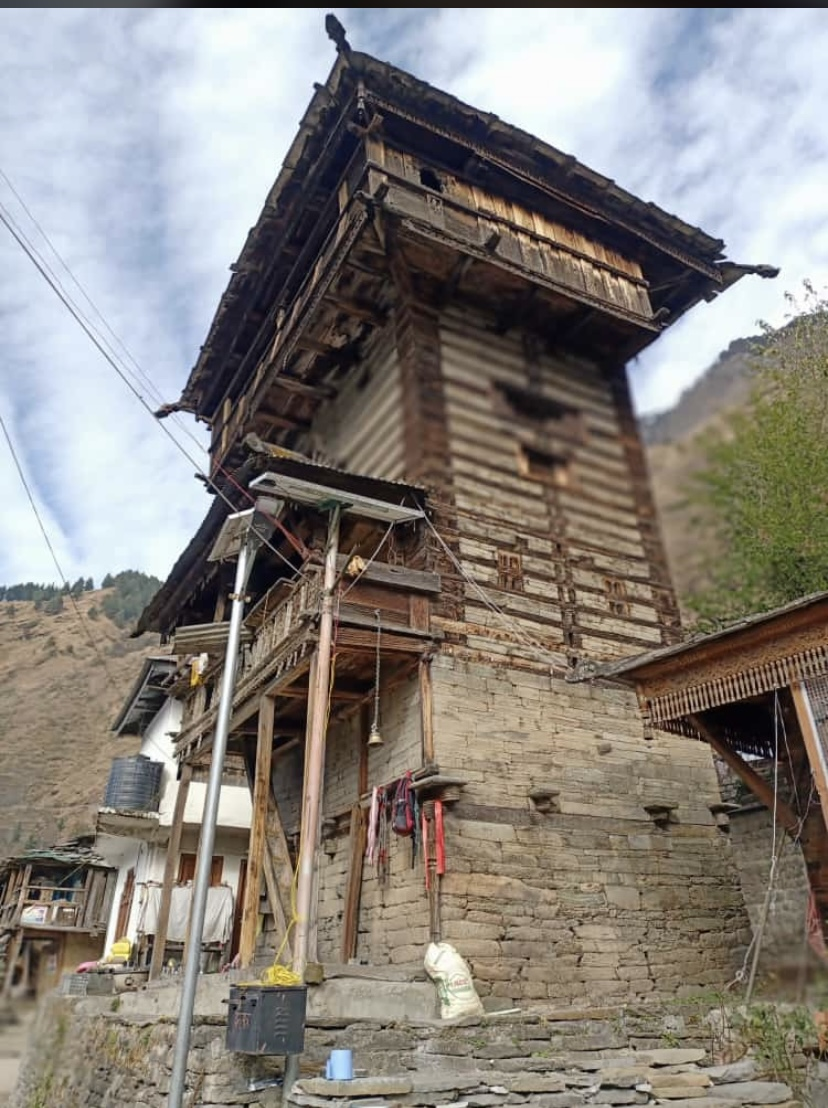
Old Temple of Laxmi Narayan Temple, Kinnu ( Old Kothi)

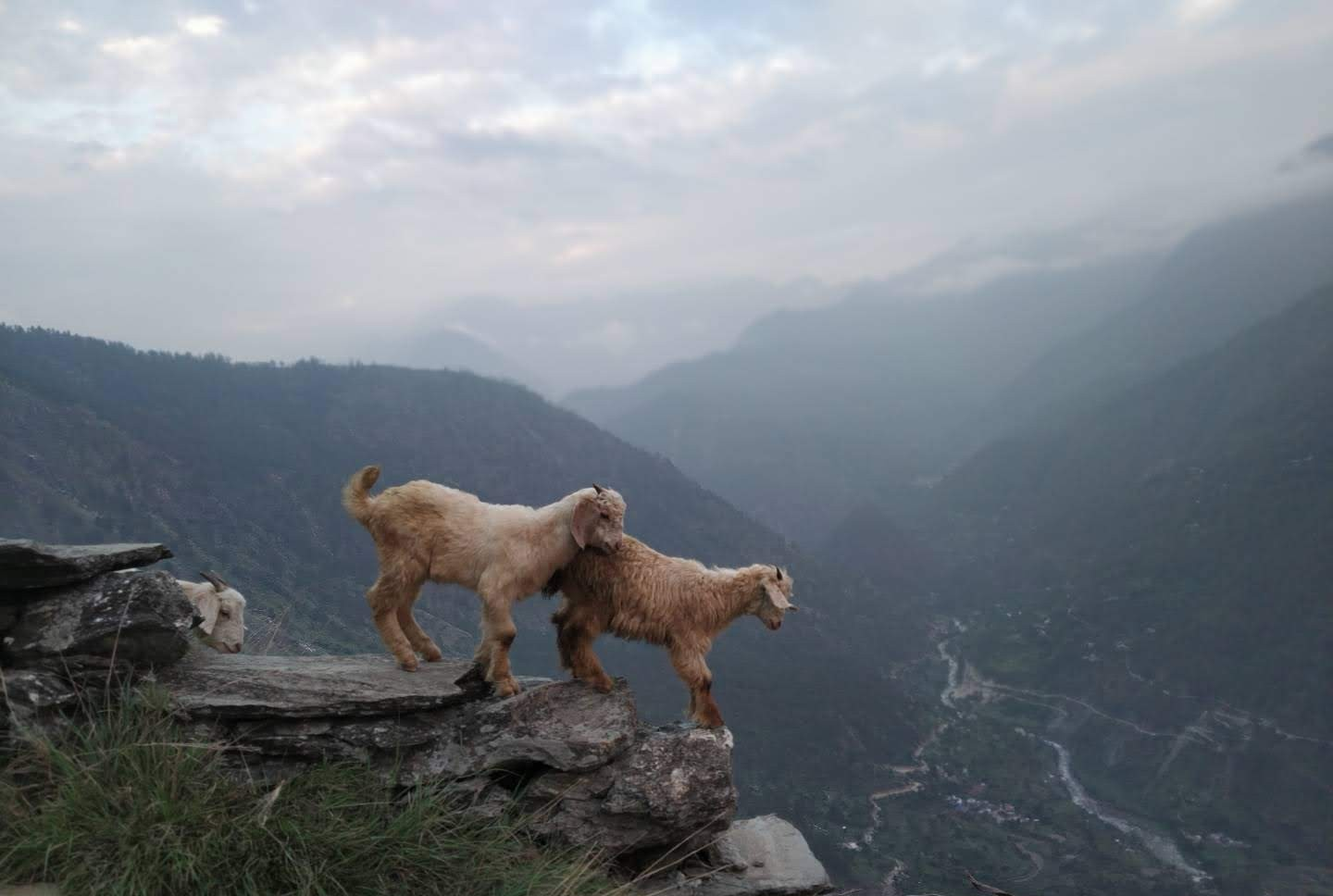
Goats in Village Lalsa of Rampur Bushahr

== Geography ==
Rampur is located at 31.45°N 77.63°E. It has an average elevation of 1021 metres (4429 feet). It is situated at the bank of the Satluj river. It borders on the north with Nirmand, on the west with Kumarsain and Anni, on the east with Kinnaur and on the south with Rohru.

== Places of interest ==
The city is nearby to popular places like Jhakri, Sarahan Bushahr, Bhimakali Temple, Green valley Bara Bish (12/20) and Shraikoti Temple to name a few.

== See also ==
- Rampur chaddar
- Lavi Fair
- Govt. PG College Rampur Bushahr
- Bushahr
