= Hydroelectric power in Himachal Pradesh =

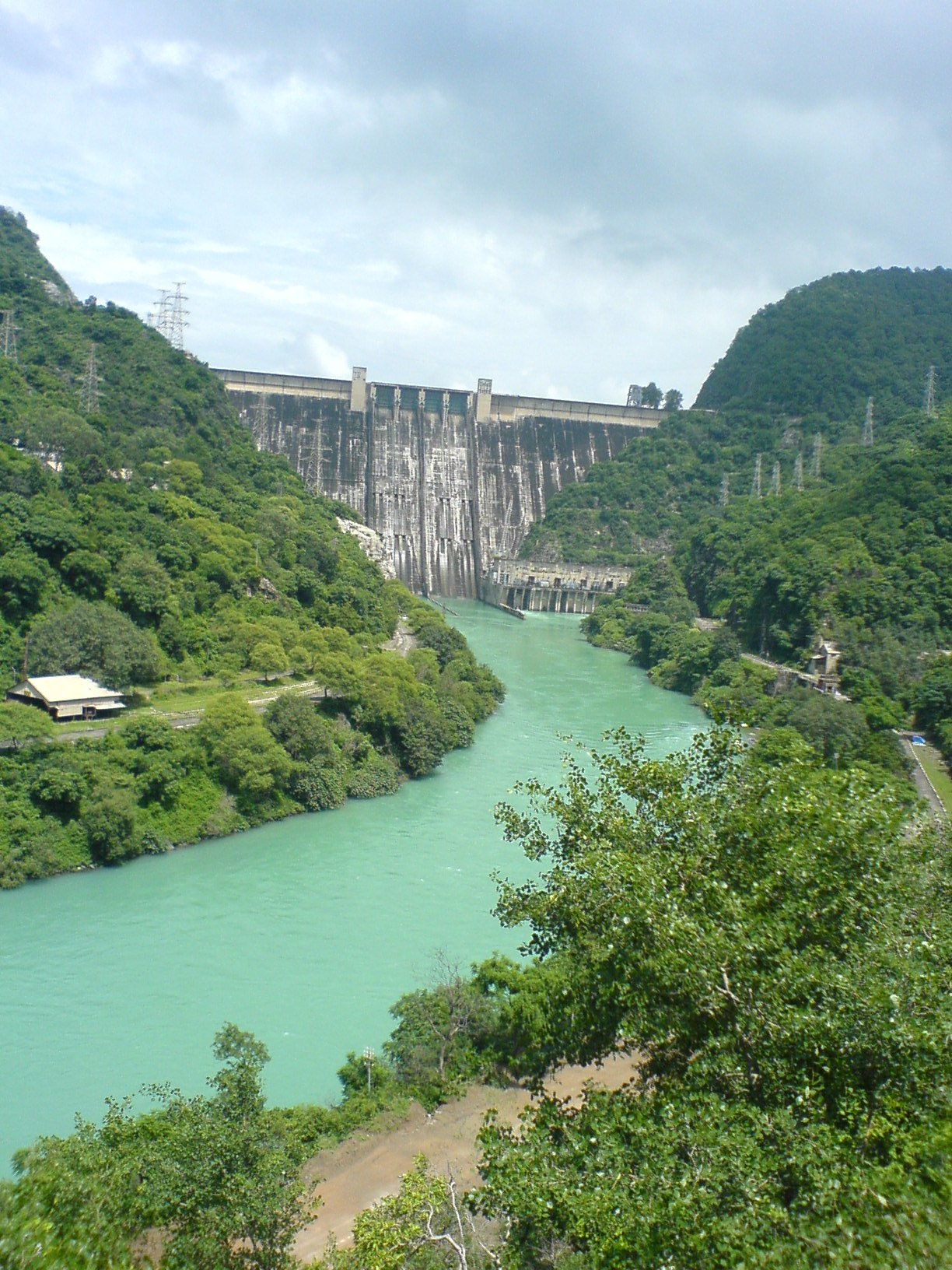
Bhakra Dam Hydroelectric Project

The Indian state Himachal Pradesh has a large number hydroelectricity resources, about twenty five percent of the national potential. About 27,436 MW of hydroelectric power can be generated in the state by the construction of various hydroelectric projects on the five perennial river basins. Out of total hydroelectric potential of the state, 10,519 MW is harnessed so far, out of which 7.6% is under the control of Himachal Pradesh Government while the rest is exploited by the Central Government. The state government has been giving the highest priority for its development, since hydroelectric generation can meet the growing need of power for industry, agriculture and rural electrification. It is also the biggest source of income to the state as it provides electricity to other states.

Although Himachal has enough resources to generate surplus power, in winter less flow of water in rivers and increase in lighting and heating load can result in power shortages that overshoot ten lakh units per day. Due to increased industrialization and rural electrification this figure is expected to rise even further.

== Completed projects ==
=== Girinagar Hydel Project ===
Situated on the river Giriganga of the Sirmour District, Girinagar Hydel project has an installed capacity of 60 MW, with 2 units of 30 MW each. This project, which is run-off-the-river scheme comes under HPSEB and is operational for 29 years.

This project was completed in 1966 by the state government.

=== Binwa Hydel Project ===
The project has an installed capacity of 6 MW comprising 2 units of 3 MW each. It is located near Baijnath in District Kangra. The project is situated 25 km from Palampur and 14 km from Baijnath and is constructed at an elevation of 1515 meters above sea level. This project constitutes a 62-meter-long tunnel that connects trench weirs in Banu Khad and Prahal Khud.

=== Sanjay Vidyut Pariyojna ===
Located in the Kinnaur district on the river Bhaba, it is a completely underground project with an installed capacity of 120 MW, comprising 3 units each of 40 MW. The uniqueness of this project lies in its underground switchyard, a feature that no other hydel project in Asia can brag about. Completed in 1989-90, the estimated cost was about 167 crore rupees. The total length of tunnels including those secured in after completing the project is 12 km.

=== Bassi Hydroelectric Project ===
Bassi project (66 MW) is an extension of Beas Power House (Mandi District) constituting 4 units of 16.5 MW each. It utilizes the tail water of Shannon Power House of Joginder Nagar project.

=== Larji Hydroelectric Project ===
Larji hydroelectric project is on river Beas in Kullu district with an installed capacity of 126 MW. In 2014, 14 students died when water was released from the reservoir. The project was completed in September 2007.

=== Andhra Hydel Project ===
Commissioned during the year 1987-88, this project has 3 units of 5.5 MW thus making 16.5 MW of installed capacity. It is located in Rohru tehsil of Shimla district. The cost of the project was estimated to be around 9.74 crores, transmitting to the state grid via the Nogli power house near Rampur.

=== Rongtong Hydel Project. ===
Rongtong is a 2 MW project that is located in the Lahaul-Spiti district on Rongtong Nullaha, a tributary of Spiti river. Located at an elevation of 3,600 metres in a snow adhered region, it was the first hydel project executed for the socio-economic upliftment of the tribals of this area. It is one of the highest in the world. The snow fed water runnel tapped at an elevation of 3,788 m is diverted through 2,825 m long channel and 259 m long tunnel into an open reservoir with a capacity of 14,000 cubic m. Renovated by APE Power Pvt. Ltd., APE Power also renovate RUKTI (4 × 375 KW) Hydro Electric project.

=== Baner and Neugal Project ===
With a combined installed capacity of 12 MW these projects are situated on Baner and Neugal streams respectively in Kangra District. Both of the streams emerge from Dhauladhar and join Beas in the form of tributaries in south.

=== Nathpa Jhakri Project ===
One of the major project on the Sutlej river is the Nathpa Jhakri Dam which generates nearly 1500 MW of electricity. The project is funded by the World Bank. Its construction cost is around 8000 crores. It is in 2 districts; the powerhouse is in Shimla and the dam is in Nathpa which is in Kinnaur district

=== Sainj Hydroelectric Project ===
It has an installed Capacity 100 MW. (2×50 MW). It is situated in Kullu district.

=== Bhakra Dam ===
The Bhakra Dam is the first dam to have come up on the Satluj river, it is one of the highest gravity dams in the world and has an installed capacity of 1325 MW. The dam holds excess waters during the monsoon and provides a regulated release during the year. It also prevents damage due to monsoon floods. The dam provides irrigation to 10 million acres (40,000 km²) of fields in Punjab, Haryana, and Rajasthan. Bhakra Dam is established in 1954.
