= Nathpa Jhakri Dam =

- Location within India Location within Himachal Pradesh
- Location: Rampur Bushahr, Shimla district, Himachal Pradesh; India
- Coordinates: 31°33′50″N 77°58′49″E
- Construction began: 1993
- Opening date: May 2004
- Construction cost: ₹8187 crores
- Owner: SJVN

Dam and spillways
- Type of dam: Concrete gravity
- Impounds: Satluj River
- Height: 67.5 m (221 ft)
- Length: 185 m (607 ft)
- Dam volume: 200,000 m^{3} (261,590 cu yd)
- Spillway capacity: 5,660 m^{3}/s (199,881 cu ft/s)

Reservoir
- Total capacity: 3,430,000 m^{3} (2,781 acre⋅ft)
- Active capacity: 3,030,000 m^{3} (2,456 acre⋅ft)
- Surface area: 234.5 m (769 ft)

Nathpa Jhakri Hydro Power Station
- Coordinates: 31°29′52.5″N 77°42′33″E
- Operator: SJVN
- Commission date: May 2004
- Hydraulic head: 428 m (1,404 ft)
- Turbines: 6 × 250 MW Francis-type
- Installed capacity: 1,500 MW
- Website sjvn.nic.in/businessprojectdetails/28/5/7

The Nathpa Jhakri Dam is a concrete gravity dam on the Sutlej river in Rampur Bushahr, Shimla district, Himachal Pradesh, India. The primary purpose of the dam is hydroelectric power production and it supplies a 1,500 megawatts (2,000,000 hp) underground power station with water. Before reaching the power station, water is diverted through a 27.4 km (17 mi) headrace tunnel. Construction on the project began in 1993 and it was complete in 2004. The last two of the 250 megawatts (340,000 hp) Francis turbine-generators went online in March 2004. It is owned by SJVN.

== Scheduling and generation despatch ==
The scheduling and despatch of the Nathpa Jhakri Hydro Power plant is done by Northern Regional Load Despatch Centre which is the apex body to ensure the integrated operation of the power system grid in the Northern region and comes under Power System Operation Corporation Limited (POSOCO).

Nathpa Jhakri Hydroelectric Plant supplies power to several northern Indian states and union territories apart from Himachal Pradesh in Haryana, Delhi, Chandigarh, Punjab, Jammu & Kashmir, Ladakh, Rajasthan, Uttar Pradesh and Uttarakhand.

On 6 September 2025, after extreme levels of rainfall a massive landslide near the dam blocked the National Highway-5 nearby and caused concern for the dam.

== Sponsors and investors ==
- Sponsor Nathpa Jhakri Power Corporation
- Kvaerner / ABB / Siemens / Sulzer Escher Wyss
- Foundation Continental Construction Corporation
- BHEL
- Jaiprakash Associates Limited

== See also ==
- Karcham Wangtoo Hydroelectric Plant – situated upstream
- List of dams and reservoirs in India
