= No Means No =

No Means No may refer to:

- "No means no", an anti-rape slogan that emphasizes sexual consent

== Film and television ==
- No Means No (film), an upcoming Indo-Polish film
- "No Means No", a 2001 episode of All About Us
- "No Means No", a 2006 episode of Campus Ladies

== Music ==
- Nomeansno, a 1979–2016 Canadian punk rock band
- "No Means No", a 1999 song by Michael Monroe from Life Gets You Dirty
- "No Means No", a 2002 song by Anisha Nicole
- "No Means No", a song by Ricky J

== See also ==
- No Means No Movement (disambiguation)
- Yes Means Yes, a 2008 feminist book
