= Traditional dances of Himachal Pradesh =

Indian dance

The traditional dances of Himachal Pradesh are very complicated. These dances are a vital part of tribal life. It reflects the culture and the tradition of Himachal. Hardly any festivity there is celebrated without dancing. Dance forms such as Nati are performed all over the region.

== Nati ==
Dev Nati is a traditional folk dance practiced in the Western and Central Hills of the Indian subcontinent. It is primarily native to the state of Himachal Pradesh. Nati is the most famous dance of Himachal Pradesh. It is listed in the Guinness World Record Book as the largest folk dance. It mainly originated from [Shimla, Mandi, Solan, Sirmaur, Kinnaur, and Kullu] and became popular across the state and in Chandigarh, where Himachali youth performed this on cultural programmes in colleges and universities. Nati is performed on important occasions such as marriages and is very common during weddings and fairs in HIMACHAL PRADESH (H.P.).

Nati, an intriguing dance form belonging to north India was officially listed as the "largest folk dance in the world" (in terms of the number of dancers performing) in the Guinness Book of World Records in early January 2016. This "traditional dance" essentially derives its roots from the state of Himachal Pradesh, and is also popular in the union territory of Chandigarh. This folk dance is also said to consist of different forms that includes Mahasuvi Nathi, Sirmauri Nathi, Lahauli Nathi, Seraji Nathi, Karsogi Nathi, Chauhari Nathi and Kinnauri Nathi. Furthermore, this folk dance is extremely popular in the "Himachali" region, and is performed frequently at various cultural programmes.

=== History ===
This "Himachali" dance form is said to be similar to the Raas Lila and is considered to have been developed in honour of Krishna and his "Gopis". Furthermore, it also represents the entertaining plays of Chandravali. In addition, this dance form according to tradition is supposed to be performed only by males.

Costumes used in the Nati folk dance:

Although traditionally this dance form is male oriented, these days however it is performed by women as well, and so the costume worn varies as follows:

1. For males:

The attire used mainly includes decorated caps, sashes, churidaars, and swirling tunics called Cholas.

2. For females:

Some regions wear a costume with churidaar pyjamas, ghagra and chola, popularly called Rezta or petticoat, and decorative caps they also wear gold and silver ornaments known as "Chanki and Tunki". In other regions like Kullu, a one-piece drape called Pattu is worn on a shirt and churidaar leggings. Jewellery like the Chandra Haar which is an intricate necklace of silver, and a Bumni and Payal or Jhanjhar are worn by women.

Music involved in the Nati folk dance:

The instruments used in this dance form include Narsingha, Karnal, Shennai, Dhol, and Nagara.

Training availability and dance technique involved in the Nati folk dance:

In this dance form, a group of men/women dressed in their traditional attire arrange themselves in a circle and rhythmically dance to the beats produced by instruments such as the dhol, narsingha etc. As for training centres/schools, there are none available throughout the country, since this folk dance has been developed mainly in the "Kullu" region of Himachal Pradesh, and has been essentially passed on from one generation to another.

== Mala (Garland) ==
Kayang Mala is a dance form in which dancers form a garland-like pattern by weaving each other's arms and becoming beads of the garland. Every performer is well dressed and heavily decorated with jewellery. Before commencing the dance, they are supposed to drink Chhang, which is a local drink. Kayang Mala is one of the most popular traditional dances in Himachal Pradesh

== Demon (Rakshasa) ==
This dance from Kinnaur and nearby areas are redolent of the historic period. The Kinnaur folk are compared to deer. The dance is performed with demon masks. It represents the attack of the demons on the crops and their ritual pursuing away by the forces of good. Chhambha is more or less similar to the Punjabi dance Bhangra. These dance forms are generally organised in areas having dense population. During their local festivals like Chaitol and Bishu, such community dancing can be witnessed. Men and women hold hands and dance together. Also known as Chhambha or the Rakhshasa Dance, the Demon Dance is another form of traditional dance in Himachal Pradesh that reflects its beautiful culture and simple lifestyle. It has a history dating back to thousands of years and is said to have originated in the Kinnaur region of the state. It is performed by men and women wearing demon masks while holding each other's hands. The dance group is guided by a leader called Ghure. The Demon Dance generally represents the situation of demons attacking crops and crops being guarded by gods. You must witness this mesmerising celebration while in Himachal Pradesh.

== Dalshone and Cholamba ==
The Dalshone and Cholamba dance forms belong to the Ropa Valley. The pattern formed by the dancers seems to resemble coiled serpents. Cholamba is generally performed when a tiger is killed. The dead animal's skin is stuffed and a gold ornament is put in

Cholamba Dance: It is one of the oldest-known dance forms in the state. As per locals, it is said to have been in existence for centuries. It is a unique dance form which is performed after the killing of a tiger. During its celebration, the skin of the animal is stuffed and its nose is decorated with gold ornaments.

== Shand and Shabu ==
These are the most popular dances of the Lahaul valley and are generally danced at Buddhist Gompas in the memory of the Buddha.

Shand and Shabu are two popular dance forms in Himachal Pradesh which are generally performed at Buddhist monasteries in the loving memory of Buddha. They are said to have originated in the Lahaul and Spiti district of the state.

== Luddi ==
Ludi is a dance form from the district Mandi of Himachal Pradesh and used to be performed in other areas of the state and adjacent ones in the times of Kings. This is a dance that was specifically performed in royal courts and more recently social gatherings. Luddi is a high-energy dance form that is performed by both men and women. The dance is characterized by quick, circular movements of the feet, accompanied by rhythmic clapping and chanting. The performers wear colourful traditional attire, which adds to the vibrancy of the dance.

== Tribal dances of Himachal Pradesh ==
The kikli dance form is a dance of young girls. The girls hold each other's hand crosswise and rotate swiftly on their toes.
The Bhangra is a male dance which originated in the Punjab and is also performed in some areas of Una.
The dance forms of the trans-Himalayan region differs in content and music. The old tradition of both song and dance in these regions is guarded against urban influence. Kinnaur, Lahaul and Spiti and Tehsils of Pangi and Bharmour of Chamba constitute this zone. Inhabitants are known as Kinnauras, Lahaulas, Spitians, Pangwals and Gaddis. Gujjars and many of these tribes have their own distinct traditions of folk dances, songs, dresses and ornaments.

Many ritual dances are performed by Lamas on festive occasions. One masked dance form mainly features an important event in the history of Himalayan Buddhism when Lamas effectively carried out a plan of executing King Langdarma. A special event for masked dances is the celebration of the birth of Padma Sambhava (who carried the message of Buddhism to Tibet.
