= Bushahr (princely state) =

Princely state during British Raj

Coordinates: 31°31′12″N 77°48′00″E

Bushahr State
- Princely State of British India
- 1412 A.D.–1948
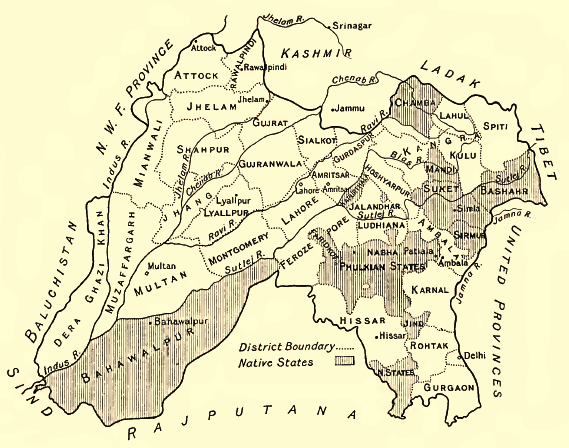
- Bushahr in a map of Punjab, 1911
- Capital: Rampur Bushahr (Last)
- Area
  - 1941: 8,907 km^{2} (3,439 sq mi)
- Population
  - 1941: 115,000
- History
  - Established: 30 August
  - Independence of India: 1948
Succeeded by
India

Bushahr, also spelt as 'Bashahr' and 'Bussahir' or 'Bushair' was a Rajput princely state in India during the British Raj. It was located in the hilly western Himalaya promontory bordering Tibet.

Bushahar was eighty four miles long, sixty two miles wide on eastern side, twelve miles wide on the western with an area of 3,820 square miles including that of Saire. The greater part of Bushahr was lying with in the drainage area of the Satluj, which runs from North-West to South-West. After Kashmir it was one of the oldest of the hill state in the Western Himalayas. According to legend Bushahar Dynasty was found by Pradyumana, the son of Lord Krishna. In order to marry the daughter of Banasur, the local chief of Shonitpur (Sarahan). Pradyumana is said to have come to that place after the death of Banasurin an encounter with him, he became the chief of Bushahar and Kinnaura region, since Bushahar had no male heir. Another legend describes Pradyumna the youngest of two brothers who had come from "Kanchanaapuri" in the south on pilgrimage to the "Bhimakali" temple at Sarahan. Since the throne was vacant at the time of death of last Raja without heir. Pradyumana who happened to enter the place gate first at a specified timeas had been ordained by the goddess "Bhimakali" was declared as their ruler. The elder brother was appointed as the priest of the royal family with a jagir at 'Village Rawain' near Sarahan. According to C.F. Kennedy Bushar State was founded by Danwar Singh, an immigrant Rajput from Deccan in 1412 A.D. The seat of government, was at 'Kamru' and from that place, the founder conquered lower hills. But the earlier historical mentions of Bushahar is found in chronicles of Kullu, when it was over run by Maru Verman at the end of 7th century AD Shitthal Pal, the son of Datesh Pal of Kullu, it is said fled to Bushahar and took refuge. So C.F. Kennedy was proven wrong. The territory of this former state is now part of Kinnaur and Shimla districts of the present Himachal Pradesh state. The erstwhile Bushahr state was traversed by the Sutlej river. It was bordered on the west by the Kulu, Lahaul and Spiti states and by Tehri Garhwal on the east. It had an area of 8,907 km^{2} (3,439 sq mi).

== History ==
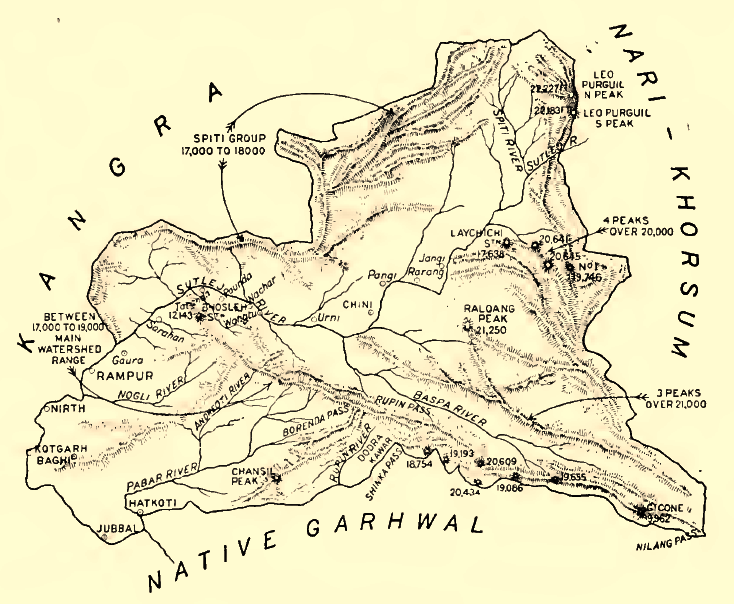
Map of the Bushahr state, 1911

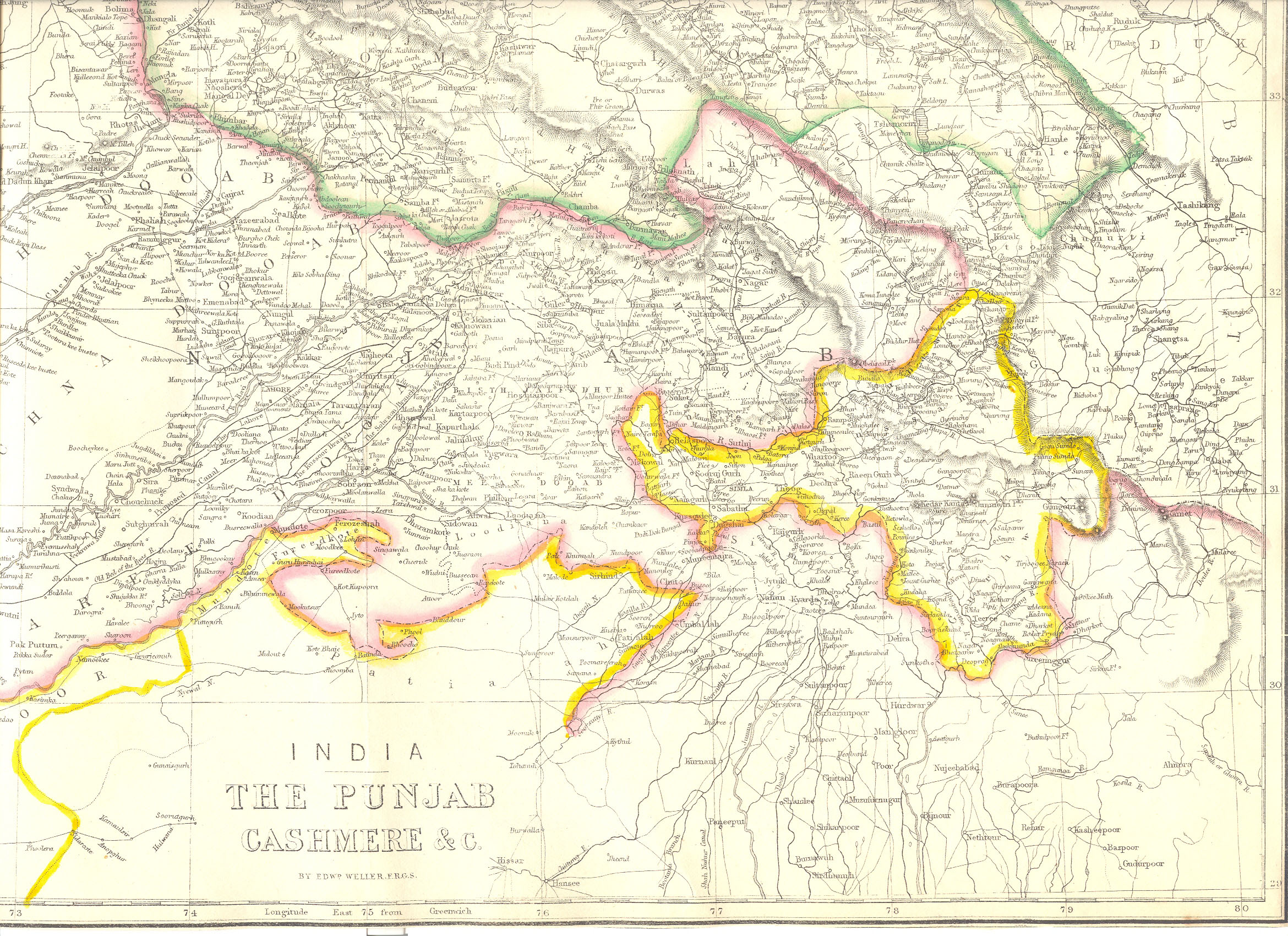
Bushahr and Tehri Garhwal shown in yellow in an 1863 map of Eastern Punjab

Raja Kehri Singh is said to have been one of the strongest Kings of history of late period of Bushahar. He is said to have reduced tributes to Raja of Sirmaur, Garhwal, Mandi and Suket and to have subdued the thakur's of Keonthal, Kothkhai, Kumhar-Sain, Balsan, Theog, Darkoti Rana of Jubbal etc. Raja Kehri Singh was contemporary of 'Grajaydoke' the ruler of Tibbet. During this time, the Raja of Ladakh annexed the territory of Tibbet. A Tibbetans Commander, 'Guldenchhen' started preparation to take back the territory. Kehri Singh learnt about this and concluded a treaty with Tibbet. Raja Kehri Singh also defeated commander Guldenchhen in a battle in the latter half of the 17th century. At the end of the battle, a treaty was signed. The terms of the treaty were such. " Till the black crow doesn't run white, till Mansarovar doesn't go dry, till whole of snow from above the kailash doesn't melt, the kailash will remain boundary line between Kinnaur and Tibbet". The Tibetan-Ladakhi-Mughal war took place in 1681-83 A.D. Kehri Singh aligned with Tibbet in this war against Ladakh. At the time of this war there was an alliance and a brief general agreement about friendly relations and exchange of envoys between Raja Kehri Singh of Bushahar and VI Dalai Lama. Tibbet and Bushahar would remain friends and traders from both sides would enjoy all facilities without payment of any tax. This treaty between Bushahar and Tibbet continue till the borders were sealed in 1962. Raja of Bushahar also received 'Hangrang valley' from Tibbet as a 'Jagir'. After the completion of this treaty the trade festival Lavi Fair was first celebrated in 1683 and is continuously being celebrated every year. Part of erstwhile Bushahr state was separated by the river Satluj was occupied by a Gorkha king from central Nepal from 1803 to 1815. Ranjit Singh, the ruler of the Sikh state in the Punjab, along with aid from hill Rajputs and their Princely States intervened in 1809 and drove the Nepalese army east of the Satluj river. A rivalry between Nepal and the British East India Company over the annexation of minor states bordering Nepal eventually led to the Anglo-Nepalese War (1815–16) or the Gurkha War, in which local hill rulers aided Britishers against Gurkhas. Both parties eventually signed the Treaty of Sugauli, following which the Gurkhas were expelled from Kamru, the capital of Bushahr.

In 1898, Bushahr state was taken over by the British administration, although the Râja remained nominally in charge. After British occupation, the Bushahr state was by far the largest of the 28 Simla Hills States. There was a tax revolt by Bushahr's peasants in 1906.

=== Heads of State ===
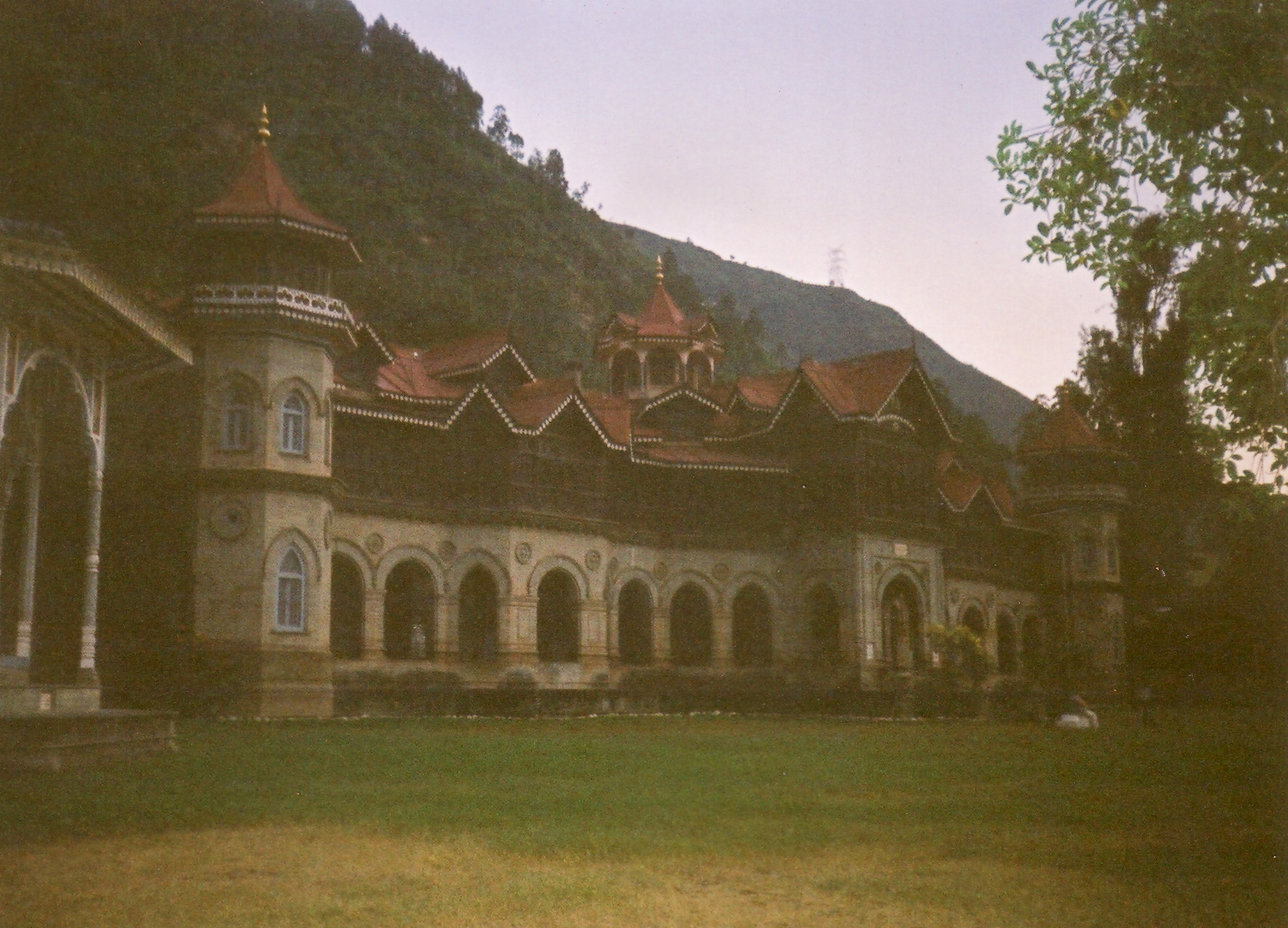
Padam Palace

The original seat of the rulers of the erstwhile Bushahr state was at the Kamru Fort, in the village of Kamru at the banks of the Baspa River at Sangla in Kinnaur. The fort is currently abandoned and houses an idol of Kamakhya Devi (Kamakshi Dev), which is believed to have been brought several centuries ago from Kamakhya temple in Guwahati. The rulers subsequently moved to Sarahan. The Palace of the "Raja of Bushahr state" at Sarahan ("The Srikhand view") was built by the order of Raja Padam Singh for his lodging in September 1917. The current residence of the "Raja of Bushahr state" is at the Padam Palace at Rampur, Shimla district. The town of Rampur may have been founded by Raja Kehri Singh in the 17th century or by Raja Ram Singh in the 18th. The rulers moved down from their traditional seat in Sarahan to the banks of the river Sutlej. Bushair was one of the richest princely states in the hills and was an important center for trade between Tibet, Kinnaur and the lower areas.

With a personal nine-gun salute, the ruler of Bashahr was the only Hills "Raja" amongst India's upper class of princely salute states, but was not entitled to the style of His Highness until independence in 1947.

== Rulers ==
Rulers bore the title of Rana and then Raja.

Ranas

- ???? - 1780 : Kehri Singh
- 1780 - 1799 : Ram Singh
- 1799 - 1803 : Ugar Singh
- 1803 - 1815 : Nepalese occupation

Rajas

- 1816 - 1850 : Mahendra Singh
- 1850 - 1887 : Shamsher Singh
- 1887 - 1898 : Raghunath Singh
- 1898 - 1914 : Shamsher Singh (return to power)
- 1914 - 1947 : Padam Singh
- 1947 - 2021 : Virbhadra Singh (titular)
- 2021 - till date : Vikramaditya Singh (current)

== See also ==
- Simla Hills States
- Political integration of India
