= State Highway 10 (Himachal Pradesh) =

Road in Himachal Pradesh, India

State Highway 10

- Road map of State Highway 10 of Himachal Pradesh highlighted in Yellow color.

Route information
- Maintained by HPPWD
- Length: 80 km (50 mi)

Major junctions
- West end: Theog
- East end: Rohru

Location
- Country: India
- State: Himachal Pradesh
- Districts: Shimla district
- Primary destinations: Theog, Kotkhai, Jubbal, Rohru

Highway system
- Roads in India; Expressways; National; State; Asian; State Highways in Himachal Pradesh

State Highway 10, commonly referred to as HP SH 10 or Theog-Hatkoti road, is a normal state highway that runs through Shimla district in the state of Himachal Pradesh, India. This state highway touches the cities of Theog, Kotkhai, Jubbal, Hatkoti, Rohru. The length of State Highway 10 is 80 km. The road is considered as a lifeline for apple producing areas like Jubbal, Kotkhai and Rohru.

== State Road Project ==
State Highway 10 comes under phase I of Himachal Pradesh State Road Project.

== State Highway 10 overview ==
State Highway 10 travels through following towns:

- Theog
- Chhaila
- Hulli
- Gumma
- Kokunala
- Kotkhai
- Nihari
- Parshal
- Kharapathar
- Paraunthi
- Jubbal
- Hatkoti
- Patsari
- Rohru

== History and development ==
The road was built by Himachal Pradesh State Government in 1965.

=== Widening of the Road ===
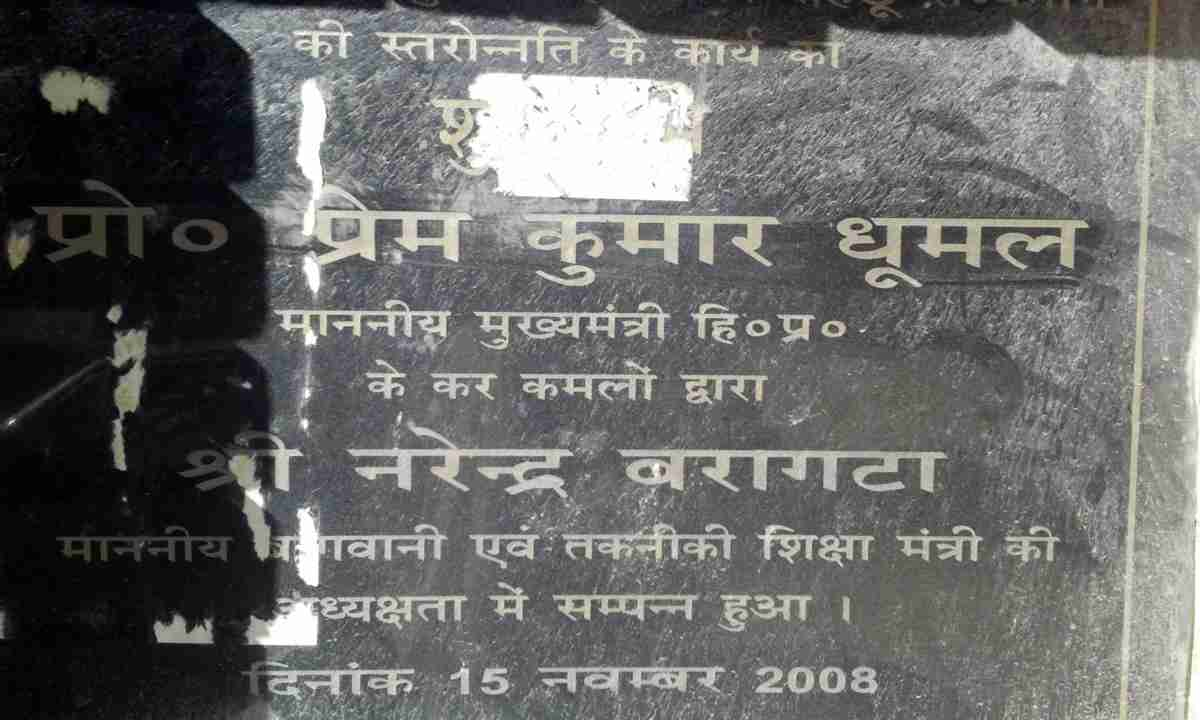
Widening of the Road launched at Hulli village

Specifications
  - Length: 80 kilometers
  - Roadway width: 9 meters
  - Carriageway width: 7 meters
  - Bridges: 14

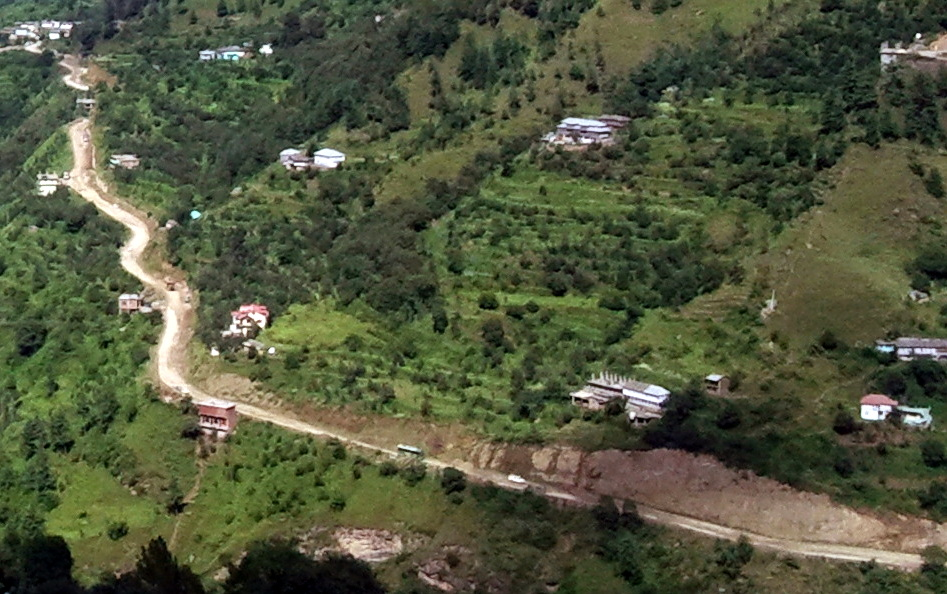
View of HP State Highway 10 near Gumma village

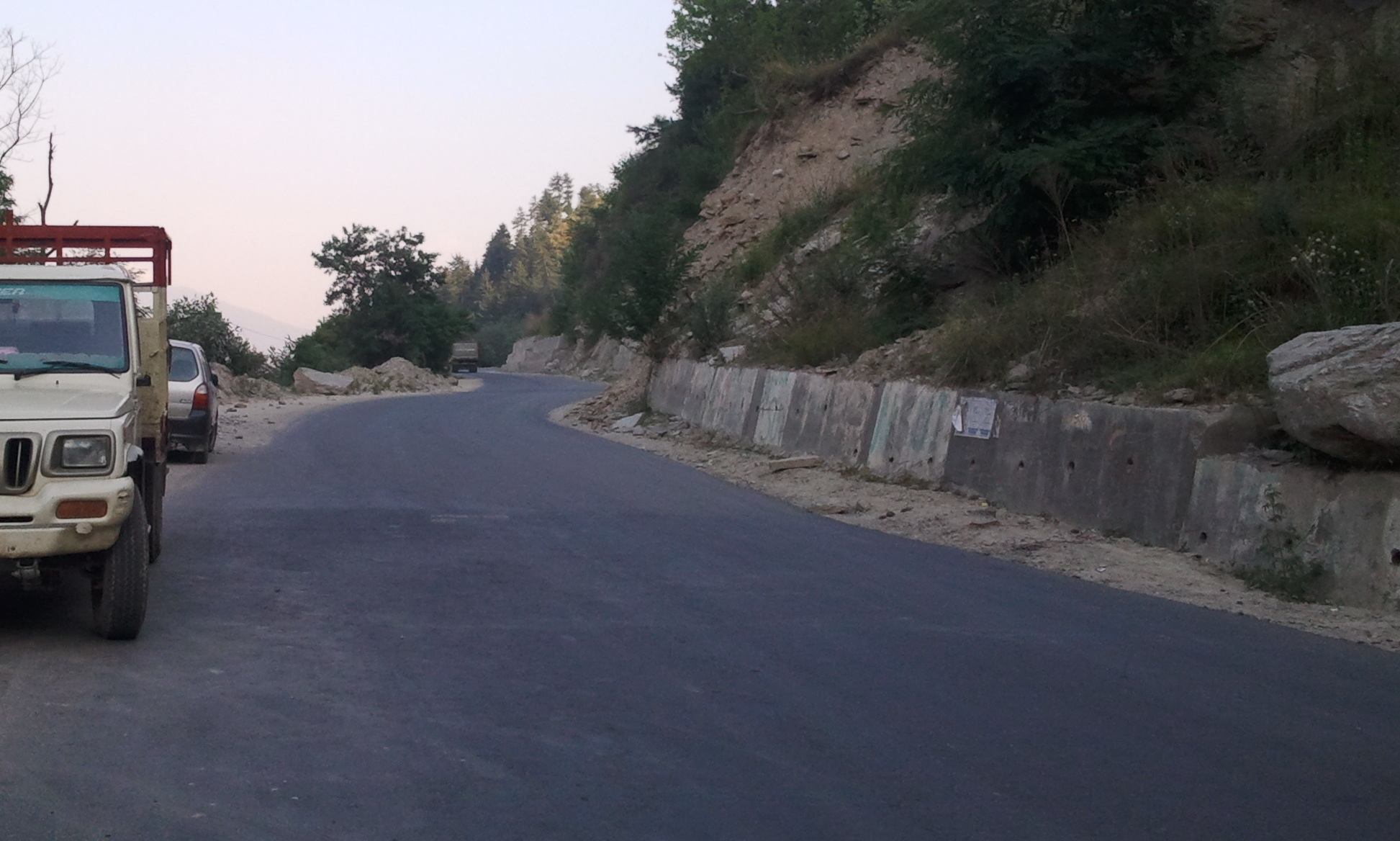
HP State Highway 10 near Hatkoti

==== Contract Award to Longjian Road and Bridge Limited Company ====
On 22 February 2008, funded by World Bank, contract had been given to the Chinese firm Longjian Road and Bridge Limited Company of China for Rs 228 crore for widening and strengthening of the Road. On 15 November 2008 Chief Minister of Himachal Pradesh, Prem Kumar Dhumal launched the road project at Hulli village.

==== Termination of the Contract ====
Due to non-availability of hindrance free construction site among other reasons, inadequate funding, very slow progress of work, non-mobilization of resources like machinery, manpower and materials Longjian Road and Bridge Limited Company could not accomplish it. Work on the road had come to a halt then the contractor compelled to send a Notice of Termination of Contract on 25 July 2012. The contractor therefore moved section 9 of Arbitration and Conciliation Act, 1996 on 26 July 2014 against the employer in the Honourable High Court of Himachal Pradesh. Thereafter, government decided to cancel the contract awarded to it. PWD minister Gulab Singh informed the State Assembly on 29 August 2012 that contract for the road project stood terminated with effect from 27 July 2012.

==== New Tender for the project ====
In February 2013, Government of Himachal Pradesh headed by Virbhadra Singh sent fresh tender documents to the World Bank to start the project afresh. It was decided to undertake the work in two phases, the first being the 48 km long stretch from Theog to Khara Pathar and the second the 32 km long stretch between Khara Pathar to Rohru. The delay since 2008 had raised the cost of the project from Rs 228 crore to Rs 321 crore.

- Theog - Kharapathar stretch

Length of the Theog - Kharapathar stretch is 48 km.

- Kharapathar - Rohru stretch

Length of the Kharapathar - Rohru stretch is 32 km.

==== Contract Award to C & C Company ====
In October 2013, Government of Himachal Pradesh gave its approval to award the 321 crore World Bank funded project to the Gurgaon based C & C Constructions Ltd. Divided into two packages, C & C Constructions Ltd secured first project from Theog to Kharapather 48 km long for Rs. 179 crore. The second 32 km stretch from Kharapather to Hatkoti for Rs. 142 crore.

On 19 November 2013 the agreements for the award of the two packages were signed between project director Naresh Sharma and Director of C & C Constructions Ltd R. N. Aggrawal in the presence of Andrew Vogle, independent contract supervision consultant for the World Bank-funded project in Shimla.

==== Writ petition on abnormal delay ====
On 3 December 2015 Himachal Pradesh High Court admitted a writ petition on abnormal delay in completion of the road project. The court also constituted a three-member committee consisting of Chief Secretary, Principal Secretary (Public Works) and Engineer-in-Chief to monitor the progress and file status report on every hearing.

=== Declared as National Highway ===
On 29 April 2015 The road has been declared the National Highway and the Union Ministry of Surface Transport has issued a notification in this regard.

== Accidents ==
Due to difficult terrain and geographical conditions it is an accident prone road.
