= List of state highways in Himachal Pradesh =

This is a list of state highways in Himachal Pradesh, India.

== Introduction ==
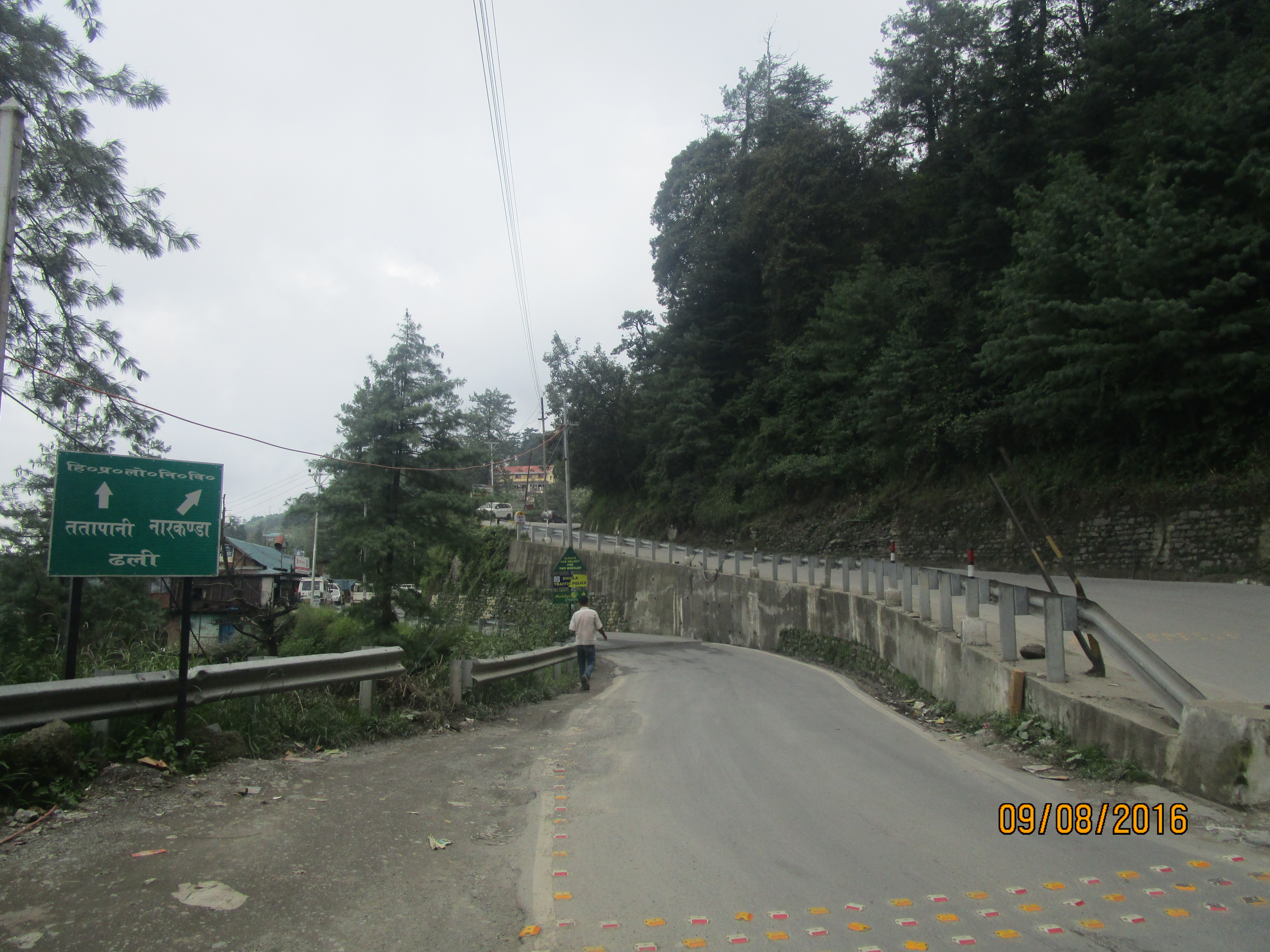
Starting point of SH 13 near Shimla

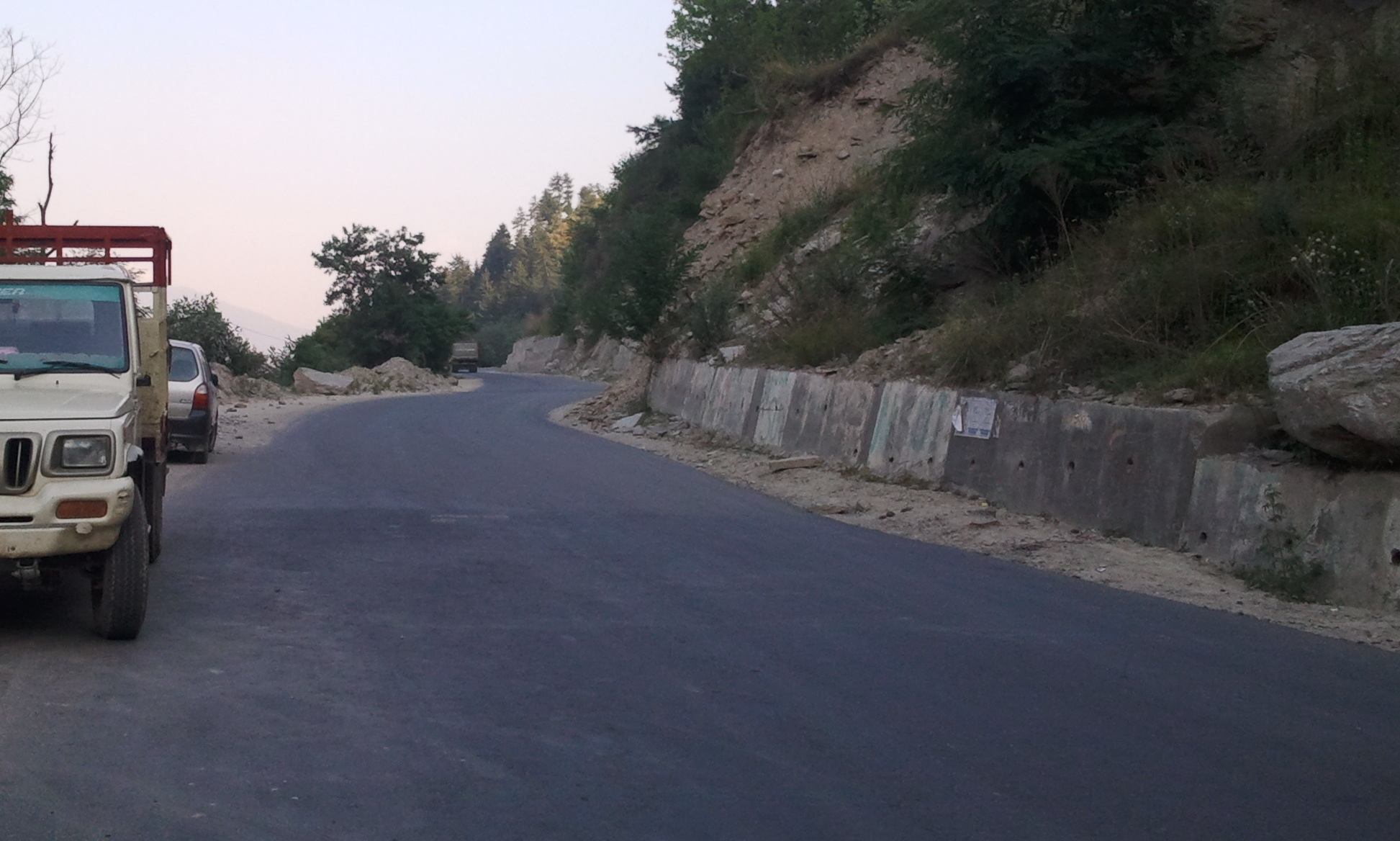
HP State Highway 10 near Hatkoti

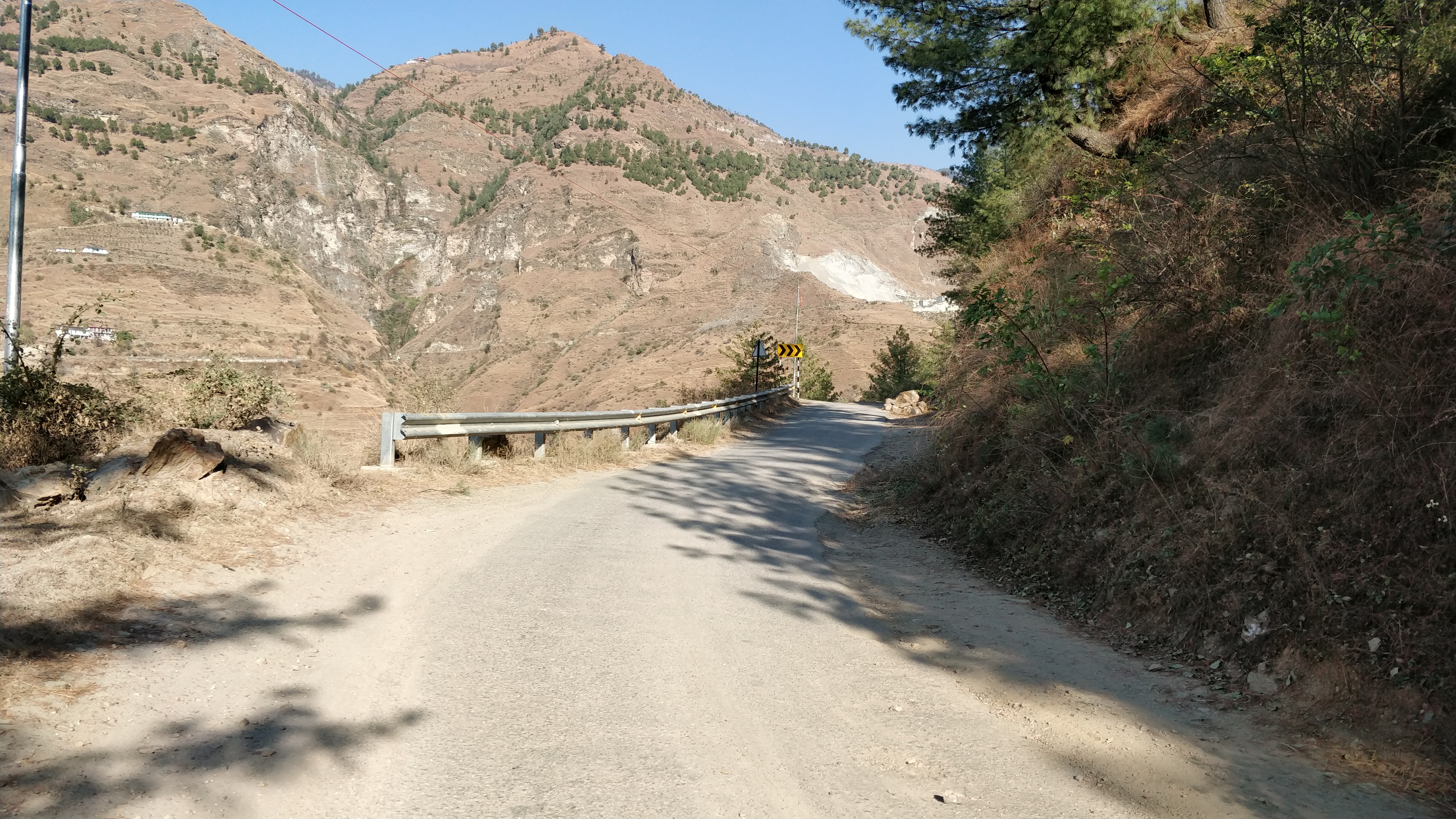
HP State Highway 8 near Dhanot

Himachal Pradesh state has a good road network. There are 9 national highways with total length of 1,250 km, 20 state highways with total length of 1,625 km and 45 major district roads with total length of 1753.05 km. No road in Himachal is a state highway after the government issued a notification denotifying all sixteen state highways in 2017.

== List of state highways in Himachal Pradesh ==
State Highway No.	Route	Passes through - district(s)	Length (in km)
HP SH 1	Lal Dhank Paonta Rajban Hatkoti (except NH portion and RD 133/0 to 171/0 in Uttrakhand)	Shimla	28.0
HP SH 2	Kumarhatti-Sarahan-Nahan (Dosarka)	Sirmour Solan	78.0
HP SH 6	Chhaila Neripul Yashwant Nagar Oachghat Kumarhatti	Shimla Sirmour Solan	86.3
HP SH 8	Sainj Chopal Nerwa Shallu	Shimla	90
HP SH 9	Shalaghat Arki Kunihar Brotiwala	Solan	80.4
HP SH 10	Theog Kotkhai Hatkoti Rohru	Shimla	80.450
HP SH 11	Sainj Ani Banjar Aut	Kullu Mandi	96
HP SH 13	Shimla SunniTattapani Mandi	Shimla Mandi	55
HP SH 16	Shimla Kunihar Ramshehar Nalagarh Ghanoli	Shimla Solan	112.3
HP SH 17	Dharamshala- Dadh-Palampur-Holta-Chadhiar Sandhol (Except NH portion)	Kangra, Mandi	90
HP SH 19	Jogindarnagar-Sarkaghat-Ghumarwin (except NH portion)	Mandi, Bilaspur	83.0
HP SH 22	Jawalamukhi-Dehra-Jawali-Raja-ka-Talab	Kangra	79.6
HP SH 23	32 mile Ranital	Kangra	39.6
HP SH 25	Mehatpur-Una-Mubarikpur Daulatpur#NH||Una||67.0		
HP SH 27	Pong Dam-Fatehpur-Jassur	Kangra	53
HP SH 28	Nurpur Lahru Tunuhatti	Kangra Chamba	42.2
HP SH 32	Una-Aghar Barsar Jahu Bhambla Nerchowk	Una Hamirpur Mandi	126.3
HP SH 33	Pathankot Banikhet Chamba Tissa	Chamba	139
HP SH 39	Hamirpur Sujanpur Thural Maranda	Hamirpur Kangra	59.6
HP MDR 42	Kandrori #(NH 44)-Indora- Badukhar-Rey Khas-Khatiyar #(HP SH 27)-Chintpurni-Bharwain# (NH 503)	Kangra/Una	95.56
HP SH 43	Shahpur Sihunta Chowari	Chamba	52
HP MDR 46	Sansarpur Terrace#(HP SH 42)#(HP SH 27)-Dadasiba-Nangal-Dhaliara# (NH 503)-Pragpur-Kaloha #(NH 3)	Kangra/Una	60.92
		Total	1625.70
