= Transport in Himachal Pradesh =

Status of transportation infrastructure in Himachal Pradesh, India

Transport in Himachal Pradesh consists primarily of a road network run by the state, though railways and airways serve very limited transport needs. The geography of Himachal presents a considerable challenge to the development of transport infrastructure, though it has the highest road density among all the Hill States of India. Himachal also has 3 airports, 2 narrow gauge rail tracks and other under-construction broad gauge railway tracks, but roads remain the main mode of transport.

== History and development ==
Kinnaur was opened up in the early 1960s with the completion of the NH-5 Hindustan-Tibet National highway from Ferozepur in Punjab to Shipki La. Lahaul was opened up in the late 1960s with the construction of roads over Rohtang pass. Lahaul is reachable via roads through high passes, such as Rohtang (3,967 m, 13,050 ft), Kunzum (4,600 m, 14,913 ft) and Baralacha (4,900 m, 16000 ft). The building an efficient transport system was the top most priority in the first Five year plan. In January 1991, Himachal was linked up with the broad gauge system by extending the Delhi-Nangal rail line.

== Geography ==
The geography of Himachal presents considerable difficulty to the development of transport infrastructure. The border districts, located near the borders of Tibet and Indian union territories of Ladakh and Jammu and Kashmir, such as Kinnaur, Lahaul, Spiti and the Pangi and Bharmour tehsils of Chamba districts are the major underdeveloped and underserved tribal areas of the state. Other underdeveloped areas include Shillai in Sirmaur district, and deep cut-off valleys in the Kullu and upper stretches of Kangra districts. Spiti is a cold desert and underdeveloped area. Due to poor accessibility, life in these areas had grown in isolation.

== Roads ==
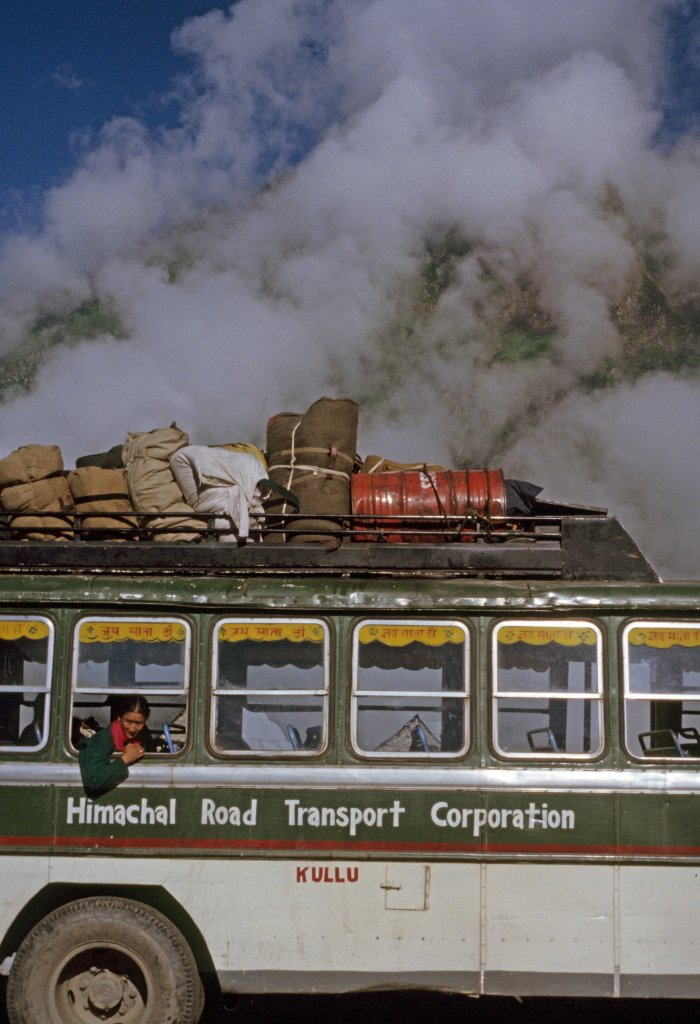
Himachal Road Transport Corporation bus outside of Manali.

The government-owned Himachal Road Transport Corporation runs a good all-weather network of buses inter & intra state including the remotest of the corners of the state. Himachal Pradesh being a major tourist destination, there is no shortage of private buses and taxis.

Most tourist spots in Himachal Pradesh such as Shimla, Manali, Dharamsala etc. are well connected by roads. Some of the roads in Himachal are seasonal and get closed during winters and monsoons due to heavy snowfall, landslides and washouts.

- National Highways (NH) with total 1235 km length in Himachal are:
  - NH 1A touches Shahpur.
  - NH 20 passes through Pathankot, Chakki, Nurpur, Joginder Nagar, Palampur and Mandi.
  - NH 21 connects Chandigarh with Manali through Mandi.
  - NH 22 connects Ambala with Kaurik through Kalka, Simla and Wangtoo.
  - NH 70 passes through Mubarakpur, Amb, Nadaun and Hamirpur.
  - NH 21A begins at Pinjore in Haryana, passes through Nalagarh and reaches Swarghat, where it connects with NH 21.
  - NH 88 connects Simla with Kangra through Hamirpur and Nadaun.
  - NH 72 begins at Ambala and passes through Amb and Paunta Sahib in Himachal Pradesh before terminating at Haridwar in Uttarakhand.
- Tunnels: The state boasts some of the longest road tunnels in the country:
  - Atal tunnel: 8.8 km long, year round link between Manali and Lahaul Valley which otherwise use to remain isolated during 8 month long winter period.
  - Aut tunnel: 3 km long on NH-21 in Mandi.
- Other roads are:
  - List of state highways in Himachal Pradesh
  - List of major district roads in Himachal Pradesh
- Other roads & vehicle related infra is:
  - List of RTO districts in Himachal Pradesh

== Railway ==
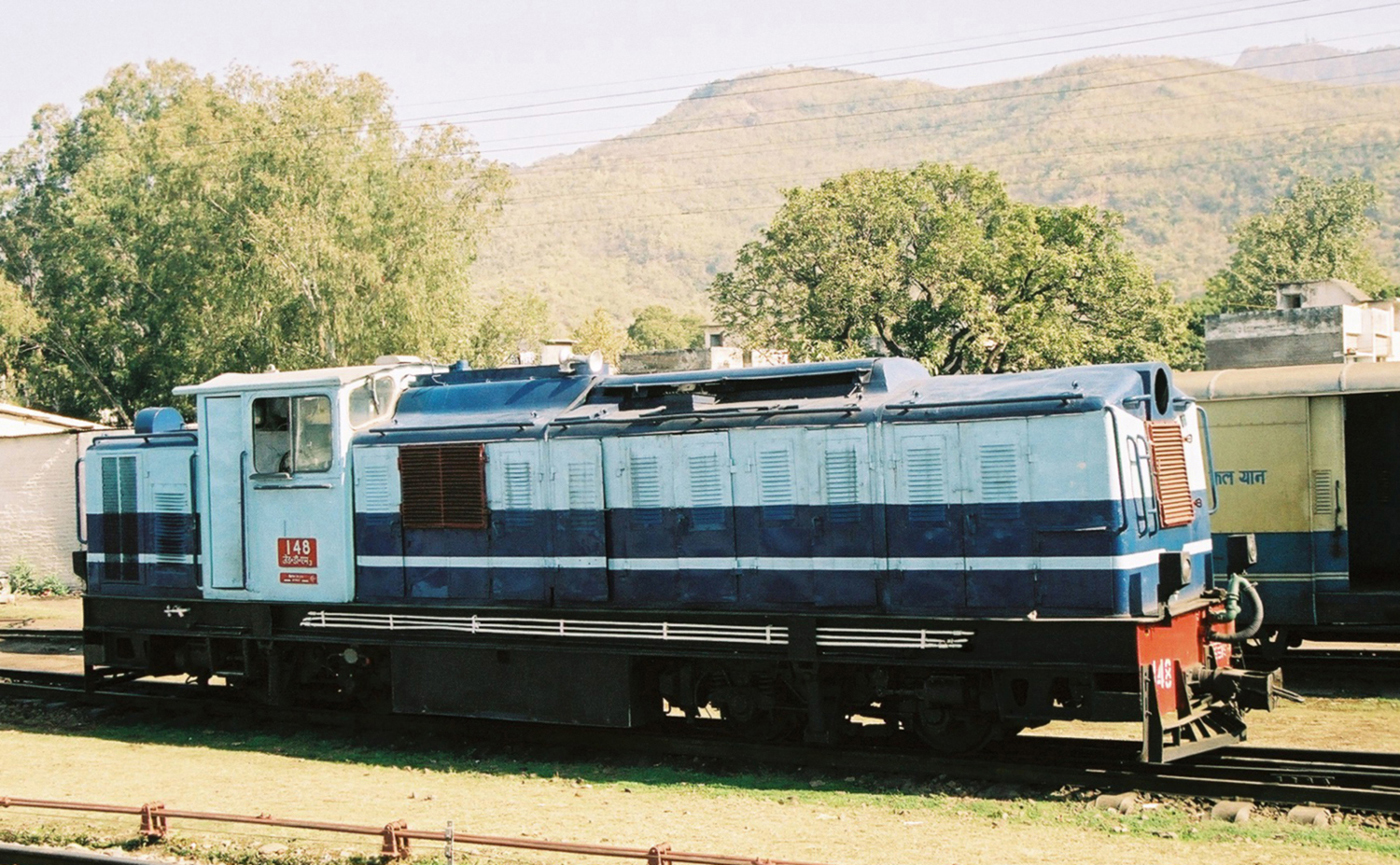
KSR diesel locomotive 148 at Kalka.

- Narrow-gauge: Mountain railways of India, listed west to east.
  - Kalka-Shimla Railway UNESCO Heritage listed track, 96 kilometers, passes through 102 tunnels and crosses 864 bridges.
  - Kangra Valley Railway, tentative UNESCO Heritage list, 164 km (101.9 mi), from Pathankot in Punjab to Jogindernagar in Himachal.
- Broad gauge, listed north to south.
  - Pathankot-Leh line, DPR was being prepared as of June 2025.
  - Bhanupli–Leh line to Ladakh, 489 km, under-construction.
  - Una–Hamirpur line: 54.1 km long project connecting Religious Devi Circuit such as Maa Jwala Mukhi and Maa Chintpurni, and costing Rs. 5,821.47 crore (50-50 cost split between Himachal and Union governments) was approved in 2017-18 with DPR and FSL already complete and no target completion date as of March 2026.
  - Nangal-Una-Talwara line along Himachal-Punjab border, 90 km long, Nangal-Una-Daulatpur Chowk is complete but 23 km Daulatpur Chowk-Talwara section is under-construction with revised target completion of December 2027 (April 2026 update). Una is connected to New Delhi by Jan Shatabdi Express and Himachal Express.
  - Chandigarh-Baddi line along Himachal-Haryana border, 33.2 km long from Chandi Mandir to Baddi, costing ₹1,672.70 crore, had target completion date of 2027 (March 2026 update).

== Air ==
The airports in Himachal Pradesh are:

1. Shimla Airport near Shimla,
2. Gaggal Airport near Kangra
3. Bhuntar Airport near Kullu.

All these airports have runways shorter than 5000 ft and therefore only allow the operation of smaller aircraft such as the Bombardier Dash 8, 42 seater ATR & 70 seater ATR.

== See also ==
- India–China Border Roads
- Strategic rail lines of India
- Transport in Jammu and Kashmir
- Transport in Haryana
- Transport in Ladakh
- Transport in Sikkim
- Transport in Uttarakhand
