= State Highway 6 (Himachal Pradesh) =

Road in Himachal Pradesh, India

State Highway 6

Route information
- Maintained by HPPWD
- Length: 86.3 km (53.6 mi)

Major junctions
- East end: Chhaila
- West end: Kumarhatti

Location
- Country: India
- State: Himachal Pradesh
- Districts: Shimla, Sirmour, Solan
- Primary destinations: Chhaila, Neripul, Yashwant Nagar, Oachghat, Kumarhatti

Highway system
- Roads in India; Expressways; National; State; Asian; State Highways in Himachal Pradesh

State Highway 6, commonly referred to as HP SH 6, is a normal state highway that runs through Shimla, Sirmour, Solan in the state of Himachal Pradesh, India. This state highway touches the cities of Chhaila, Neripul, Yashwant Nagar, Oachghat, Kumarhatti.
