= List of major district roads in Himachal Pradesh =

This is a list of major district roads in Himachal Pradesh, India.

== Introduction ==
Himachal Pradesh State has a good road network. There are 9 National Highways with total length of 1,208 km, 19 State Highways with total length of 1,625 km and 45 Major District Roads with total length of 1753.05 km.

== List of state highways in Himachal Pradesh ==
Sr. No.	Name of Road	Passes Through – District(s	Length (in km)	MDR No.
1	Nahan Dadahul Haripurdhar	Sirmour	87.00	1
2	Solan Meenus(except State Highway 6 portion)	Sirmour/Solan	98.00	2
3	Banethi Rajgarh Chandol	Sirmour	127.00	3
4	Markanda bridge Suketi park Kala Amb Trilokpur	Sirmour	21.50	4
5	Kolar Bilaspur	Sirmour	13.00	5
6	Parwanoo Kasauli Dharampur Sabhathu Solan	Solan	65.32	6
7	Barotiwala Baddi Sai Ramshar	Solan	44.95	7
8	Kufri Chail Kandaghat	Solan/Shimla	57.00	8
9	Solan Barog Kumarhatti	Solan	13.00	9
10	Dharampur Kasauli	Solan	10.50	10
11	Arki Dhundan Bhararighat	Solan	18.70	11
12	Nalagarh Dhabota Bharatgarh	Solan	9.40	12
13	Shogi Mehli Junga Sadhupul	Shimla	49.40	13
14	Mashobra Bhekhalti	Shimla	18.00	14
15	Narkanda Thanadhar Kotgarh Bithal	Shimla	44.00	15
16	Rampur Mashnoo Sarahan Jeori	Shimla	62.00	19
17	Bakrot Karsog(Sanarli) Sainj	Mandi	41.80	21
18	Salapper Tattapani Suni Luhri	Mandi/Shimla	120.80	22
19	Mandi Kataula Bajaura	Mandi	51.00	23
20	Mandi Gagal Chailchowk Janjehli	Mandi	45.80	24
21	Chailchowk Gohar Pandoh	Mandi	29.60	25
22	Mandi Rewalsar Kalkhar	Mandi	28.00	26
23	Nore Wazir Bowli	Kullu	37.00	28
24	Kullu Nagar Manali (left Bank)	Kullu	39.40	29
25	Jia Manikarn	Kullu	33.50	30
26	Swarghat Nainadevi Bhakhra	Bilaspur/Una	55.70	31
27	Nainadevi Kaula Da Toba	Bilaspur	12.20	32
28	Bamta Kandrour	Bilaspur	6.70	33
29	Nagaon Beri	Bilaspur /Solan	37.00	34
30	Hamirpur Bhoranj Jahu	Hamirpur	30.00	35
31	Nadaun Sujanpur	Hamirpur	21.00	36
32	Barsar Deothsidh	Hamirpur	11.30	37
33	Sujanpur Sandhol Marhi	Hamirpur /Mandi	45.00	38
34	Nangal Santokhgarh Tahliwal Polian Jaijon (HP Boundary)	Una	17.50	39
35	Una Hoshiarpur Bankhandi Hoshairpur	Una	15.00	40
36	Tahliwal Garhshankar (H.P Boundary)	Una	8.00	41
37	Bharwain Chintpurni Kandrori Damtal	Una /Kangra	95.56	42
38	Baijnath Ladbharol Kandapattan	Kangra/Mandi	33.00	43
39	Gaggal Chetru Dharamshala Mcleodganj	Kangra	24.00	44
40	Rait Charhi Dharamshala	Kangra	20.00	45
41	Kaloha Pragpur Dhaliara Dadasiba Sansarpur	Kangra	60.92	46
42	Kandwal Damtal	Kangra	16.50	47
43	Dadh Malan	Kangra	4.00	48
44	Banikhet Dalhouse Khajiar	Chamba	29.00	49
45	Chamba Bharmour	Chamba	45.00	52
		Total	1753.05	
