= National Highway 705 (India) =

National highway in India

National Highway 705
- Map of the National Highway in red

Route information
- Auxiliary route of NH 5
- Length: 74 km (46 mi)

Major junctions
- West end: Theog
- East end: Hatkoti

Location
- Country: India
- States: Himachal Pradesh

Highway system
- Roads in India; Expressways; National; State; Asian
← NH 5	→ NH 707

National Highway 705, commonly called NH 705 is a national highway in India. It is a branch of National Highway 5. NH-705 traverses the state of Himachal Pradesh in India.

== Route ==
Theog, Kotkhai, Jubbal, Hatkoti.

== Junctions ==
NH 5 Terminal near Theog.
NH 707 Terminal near Hatkoti.

== See also ==
- List of national highways in India
- List of national highways in India by state
