= Pujarli, Himachal Pradesh =

Multiple villages in India

Pujarli is the name of eight villages in different sub-districts of the State Himachal Pradesh, India. These are as under:

== Pujarli, Rohru ==
Pujarli, a rural village in taluk (Sub-district) Rohru in Shimla, Himachal Pradesh, has a population of 155, with 72 males and 83 females. It has a literate population of 105, 61 males and 44 females, and a worker population of 92, with a slightly higher representation of females. Main workers are mostly cultivators, while marginal workers are mostly agricultural labourers. Coordinates of the village Pujarli, Rohru are 31.277720°N 77.692820°E.

== Pujarli, Nerua ==
Pujarli, a rural village in Nerua taluk (Sub-district) in Shimla, Himachal Pradesh, has a population of 120 people, mainly males and females. Literacy rates are 78, with females slightly outnumbering males. The main working population consists of 34 males, 15 cultivators, and 9 agricultural laborers. There are no reported workers in household industries.

== Pujarli, Junga ==
In Pujarli, Shimla, Himachal Pradesh, there are 33 households and a total population of 157 individuals. Of these, 82 are males and 75 are females. The population includes 17 children aged 0–6, 9 males and 8 females. The literate population is 121, with 66 males and 55 females. The main working population is 51, mostly males, with 5 females. The marginal worker population is 45, skewed towards females.

== Pujarli, Shimla (Rural) ==
The rural village of Pujarli in Shimla district, Himachal Pradesh, has a population of 380, with 68 households and a small percentage of children aged 0–6 years. The village is predominantly inhabited by females, 283 literate and 97 illiterate. The main workers are 169, with cultivation being the primary occupation. There are 11 main agricultural laborers and 62 marginal workers, mostly cultivators, with three women working between 3–6 months of the year.

== Pujarli, Tikar ==
Pujarli-3, in Tikar Sub-district of Shimla, Himachal Pradesh, has a 144-person population with 30 households and a slightly higher female population. It has 16 children aged 0–6 and 49 Scheduled Castes, with no Scheduled Tribes representation. The literate population is 102, with 55 males and 47 females, and 42 illiterate individuals. Most of the working population is main cultivators, with a significant number being females.

== Pujarli, Chirgaon ==
D.P.F. Pujarli (42) is a village in Shimla District, Himachal Pradesh, under Chauhara Community Development Block. It is 18 kilometres away from Rohru.

== Pujarli, D.P.F. Pujarli ==
In D.P.F. Pujarli -4, Shimla district, Himachal Pradesh, there are 15 households and a total population of 58, with a male majority of 45 and females accounting for 13. The population is predominantly male, with 40 literate individuals and 18 illiterate individuals. The main working population is 45, with no main cultivators. The main household industry is 25 males, with 13 other workers and three marginal workers, all females.
