= Indian Institute of Petroleum =

Research institute in Uttarakhand, India

Coordinates: 30.2699707°N 78.0800053°E

- Established: 1960
- Director: Dr.Harender Singh Bisht (IIP)
- Faculty: YES
- Staff: 325
- Budget: Rs 100 Crores
- Address: P.O. Mohkampur, Dehradun, 248005, Uttarakhand, India
- Location: Dehradun, India
- Website: www.iip.res.in

The Indian Institute of Petroleum (IIP), established in 1960, is one of the 37 constituent laboratories of the Council of Scientific and Industrial Research (CSIR), dedicated to R&D in the hydrocarbon sector.

The Director General of CSIR based in Delhi, Dr. Nallathamy Kalaiselvi, is the head of the parent organization. Dr.Harender Singh Bisht has been the Director of the institute since 2023.

Spread over a campus of 250-acre (1.0 km^{2}), it is situated in Dehradun, the capital of Uttarakhand state, on National Highway 72 (NH 72). Established through an act of parliament in the year 1959, it started in New Delhi in 1960 and finally in Dehradun since 1963. It sought organisational help from Institut français du pétrole (IFP), France, a petroleum research organisation, under UNESCO programme during 1960 to 1964.

An ISO 9001 certified institute, IIP develops processes and products for petroleum refining and petrochemical industries, training of personnel in oil and petrochemical industries, and assisting in formulation of standards for petroleum products. The institute acquired the ISO 9001 certification in 1998.

The Institute has a sanctioned research staff strength of 120 R&D scientists supported by 224 technical personnel and 213 administrative staff. It is equipped with state of the art R&D facilities including pilot plants. The annual budget of the institute is around INR 100 crores (USD 12 Million). The institute is recognized by over 14 universities to conduct research leading to Doctorate degree.

== Research programs ==
Applied research leading to the development of technologies, products and processes in the area of Petroleum refining, Petrochemicals, Speciality chemicals, IC engines, and Combustion.

=== Expertise ===
- Process and product development (lab/bench/pilot scale)
- Process scale-up, process design
- Process optimization
- Process improvement and revamping
- Techno-economic feasibility studies
- Technology assessment
- Energy audit and conservation in chemical plants
- Vehicular pollution abatement
- Use of alternative fuels in IC engines
- Product characterisation

=== Activities ===
- Petroleum Refining and catalysis
- Catalytic refining and catalysis
- Catalyst for refining process
- Separation process, solvent extraction, adsorption, membranes
- Lubricating oil base stocks processes, evaluation and characterisation
- Modified bitumen and carbon materials
- Thermal conversion process
- Modeling and simulation
- Chemical/petrochemicals intermediates
- Additives for petrochemicals industry
- Process and product development for specialty chemicals
- Petrochemicals intermediates
- Bioprocessing of petroleum streams
- Fuel lubes and chemicals from biomass

=== Petroleum Products Application ===
- Engine emission: pollution abatements
- Alternative fuels: oxygenates, CNG, Propane, LPG, DME
- Engine development: improved efficiency, lower emission
- Tribology: evaluation and development of petroleum products, and developments of techniques for product evaluation
- Combustion: developments of industrial and domestic combustion appliances, evaluation of fire resistant properties of hydraulic fluids
- Development of Nutan wick stoves in the 1960s

=== Analytical sciences ===
- Detailed and short evaluation of crude oil
- Characterisation of petroleum products
- Characterisation of catalyst
- Technical and support services
- Instrumental analysis
- Engineering services
- Pipeline Design and Network
- Training
- Business developments and technology transfer

== Awards ==
=== CSIR Technology ===
- Production of food grade hexane by using nmp technology 2001.
- Lube oil base stock (lobs) production through nmp 2000.
- Propane deasphalting 1999.
- Visbreaking technology 1998.
- Sulfolane production technology 1997.
- Business development and technology marketing 1996.
- Low air pressure film burner 1994.
- Food grade hexane 1993.
- Bimetallic Pt-Re reforming catalyst 1992.
- Production of benzene/toluene through sulfolane extraction 1990.

=== Young Scientist ===
- 1990 Young Scientist.
- 1993 Federation of Indian Chambers of Commerce and Industry (ficci).
- 1993 Excellence in science and technology.
- 2021 Young Scientist

=== Indian Chemical Manufacturers Association (ICMA) ===
Production of benzene/toluene through sulfolane extraction 1985.

== See also ==
- Indian Institute of Petroleum and Energy
- Rajiv Gandhi Institute of Petroleum Technology
- University of Petroleum and Energy Studies
