= Sawra =

Sawra Saraswati Nagar
- Village
- Location in Himachal Pradesh, India Sawra (India)
- Coordinates: 31.123°N 77.751°E
- Country: India
- State: Himachal Pradesh
- District: Shimla

Government
  - Type: Gram panchayat
  - Paradhan: Joginder Singh
- Elevation: 1,465 m (4,806 ft)

Languages
  - Official: Hindi
  - Regional: Mahasu Pahari (Shoracholi)
- Time zone: UTC+5:30 (IST)
- PIN: 171206
- Vehicle registration: HP-10

Sawra, also called Saraswati Nagar, is a village fall in subdivision Rohru in Shimla district in the Indian state of Himachal Pradesh. It is a village situated at the banks of Pabbar River and it is about 103 kilometres away from Shimla and 12 kilometres away from Rohru. Sawra is also famous for Sawra Kuddu Hydro Electric Project.

The plant is one of the few projects in the Yamuna basin, where the government of Himachal Pradesh has identified a hydro potential of 1044.82 MW (shared between HP and Uttarakhand state). The state company HPPCL has created a Special Purpose Vehicle, namely, Pabbar Valley Power Corporation for execution of these projects on the same river. The Project was scheduled for completion in December 2011.

== Geography ==
Hatkoti is located at 31.123°N 77.751°E. It has an average elevation of 1,465 m.

== Education ==
There are many schools and college located here. Some of the popular schools in the village are D.A.V. Senior Secondary Public School, Shivalik International Public School and Government Senior Secondary School. Lal Bahadur Shastri Government Degree College is also located in the village.

== See also ==
Nearby Towns :-

- Rohru
- Jubbal
