= Hatkoti =

- Village
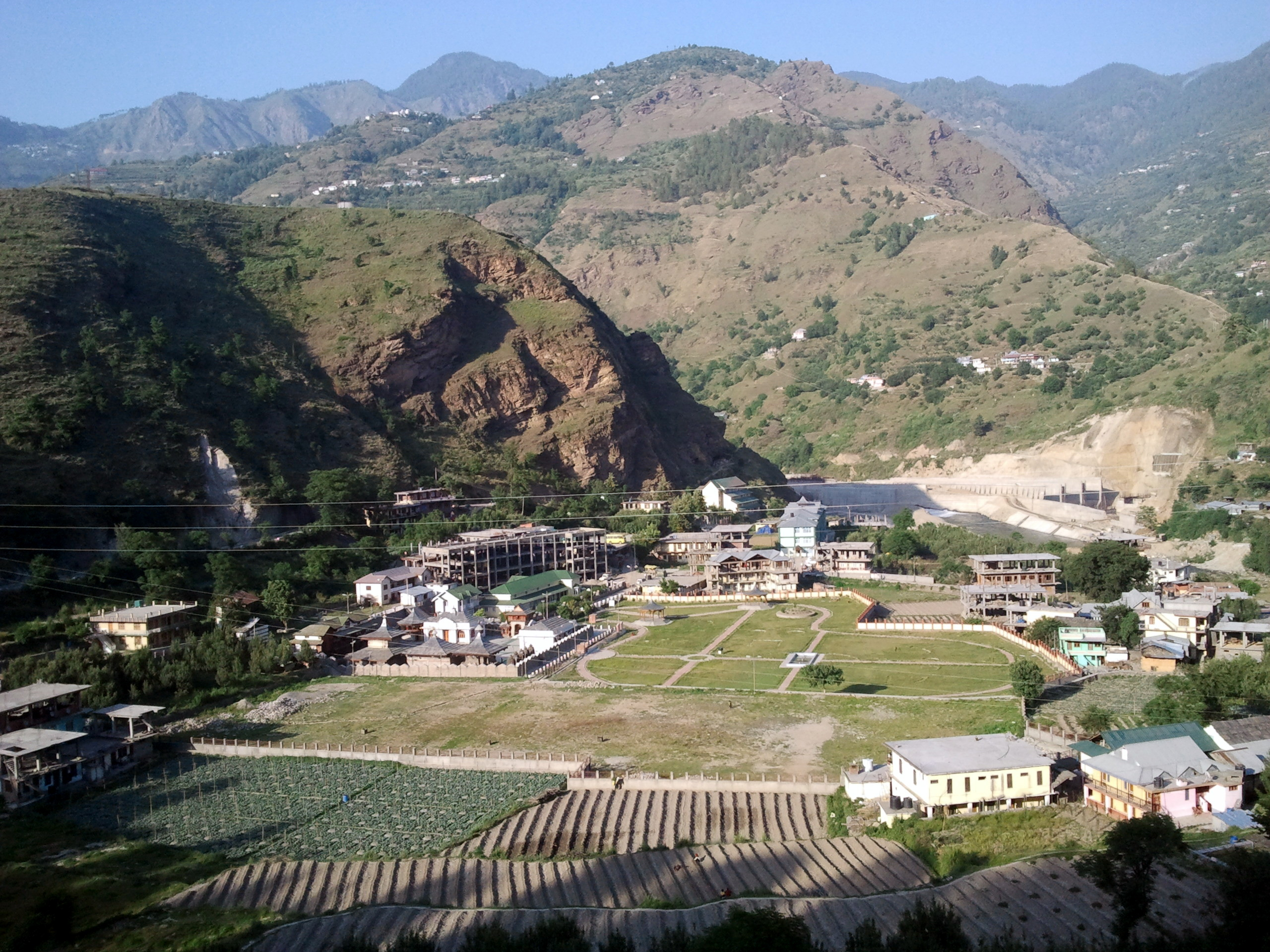

- Location in Himachal Pradesh, India Hatkoti (India)
- Coordinates: 31.131°N 77.744°E
- Country: India
- State: Himachal Pradesh
- District: Shimla
- Elevation: 1,442 m (4,731 ft)

Languages
  - Official: Hindi
  - Regional: Mahasu Pahari (Kochi)
- Time zone: UTC+5:30 (IST)
- PIN: 171206
- Vehicle registration: HP-10

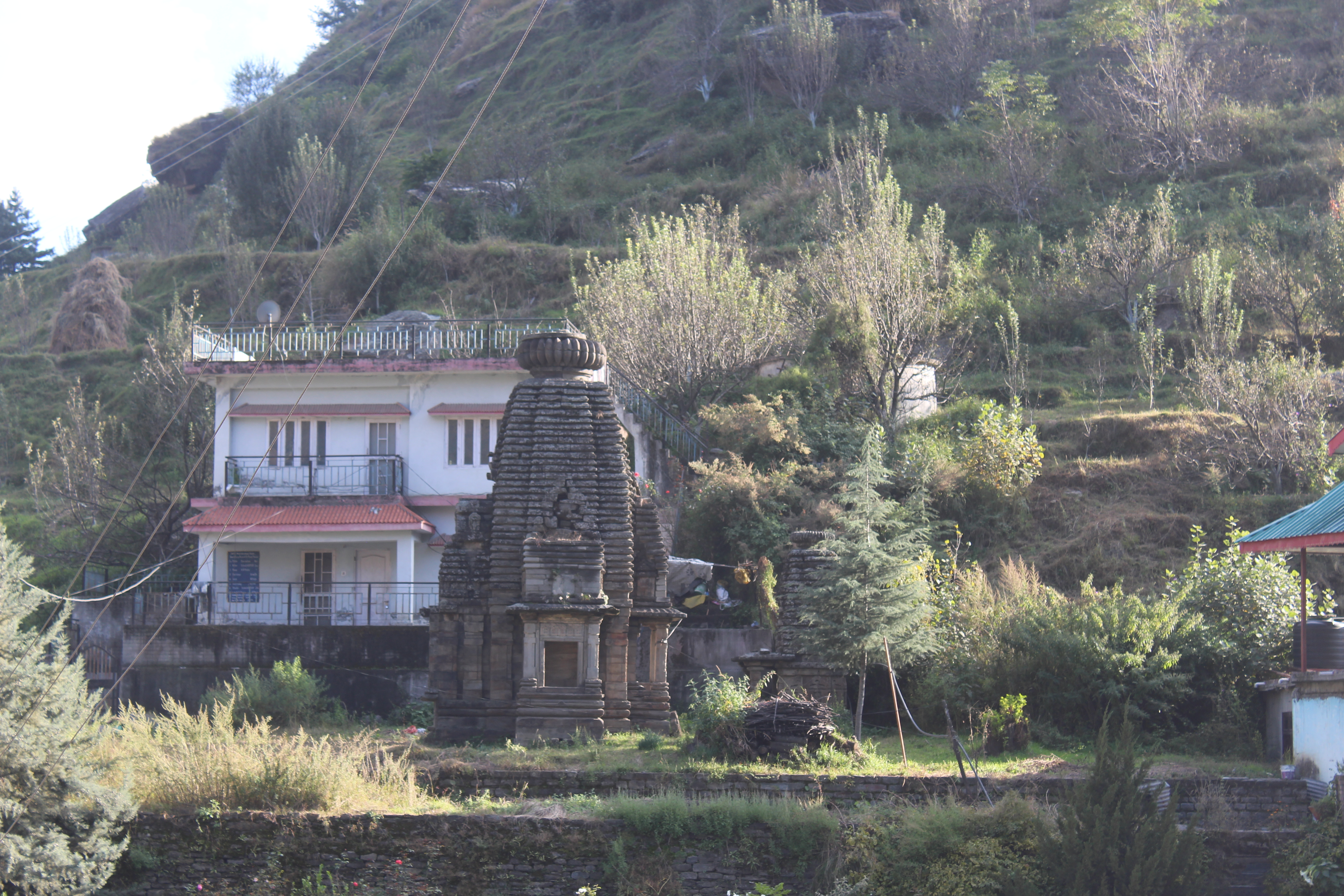
Early medieval nagara temple on the northern side of main temple, Hatkoti

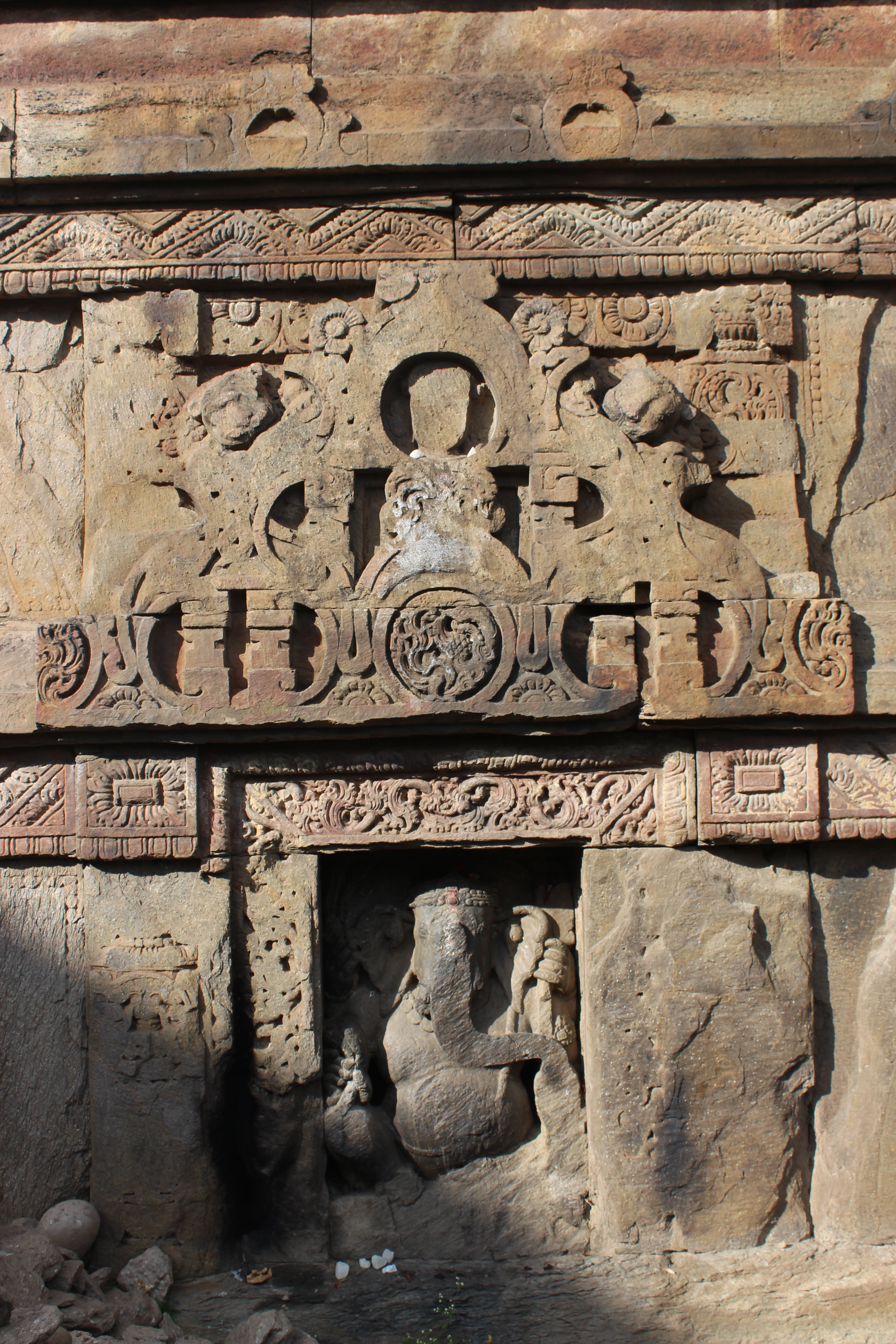
Ganesh niech details of southern wall of Prahatt Temple-I, Hatkoti

Hatkoti is a village in Shimla district of Himachal Pradesh, India. It is a village located at the banks of Pabbar River and it is about 102 kilometres away from Shimla city. Hatkoti is also famous for Hateshwari temple and Sawra Kuddu Hydro Electric Project (111 MW).

== History ==
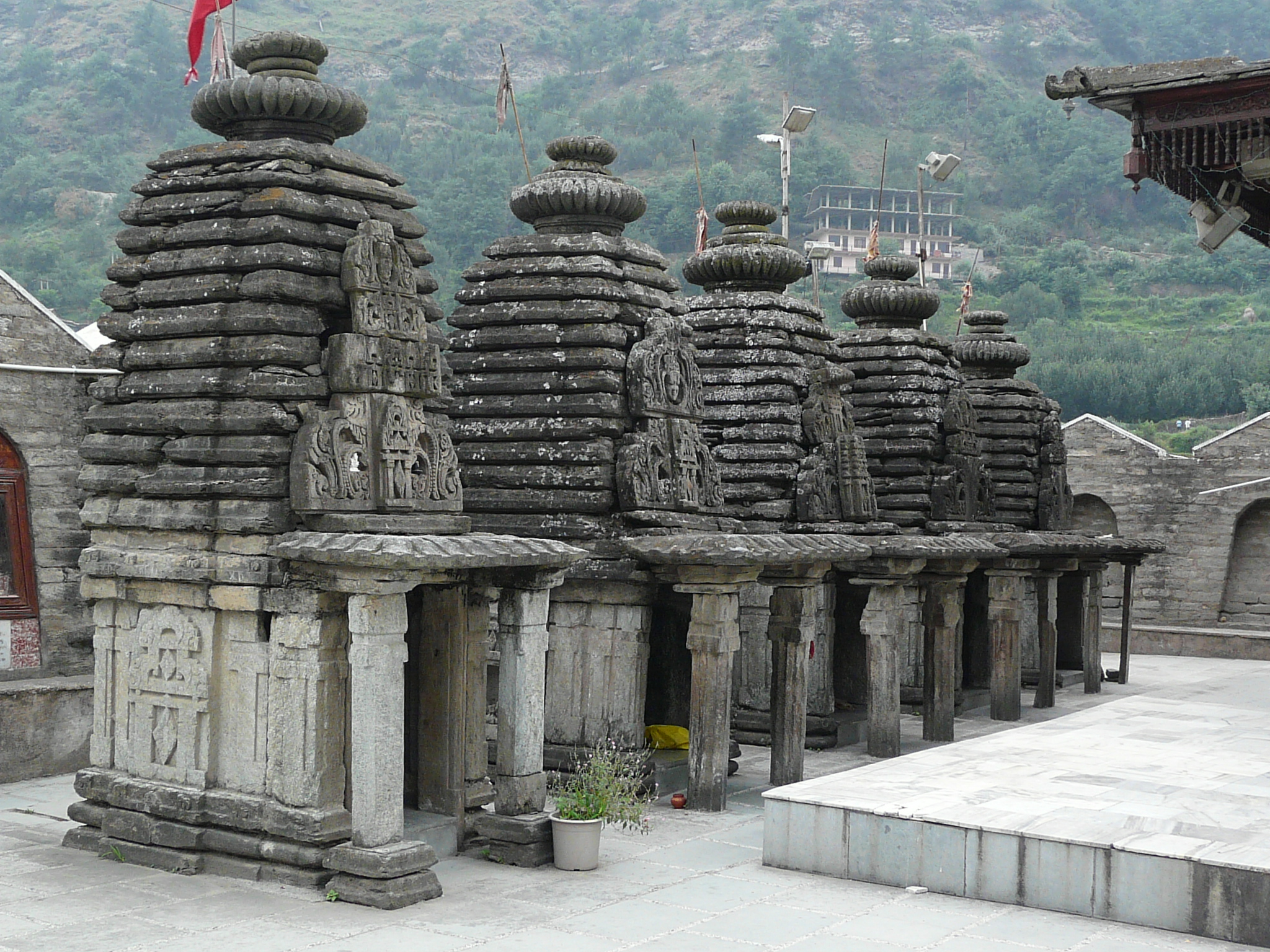
Hateshwari temple, Hatkoti

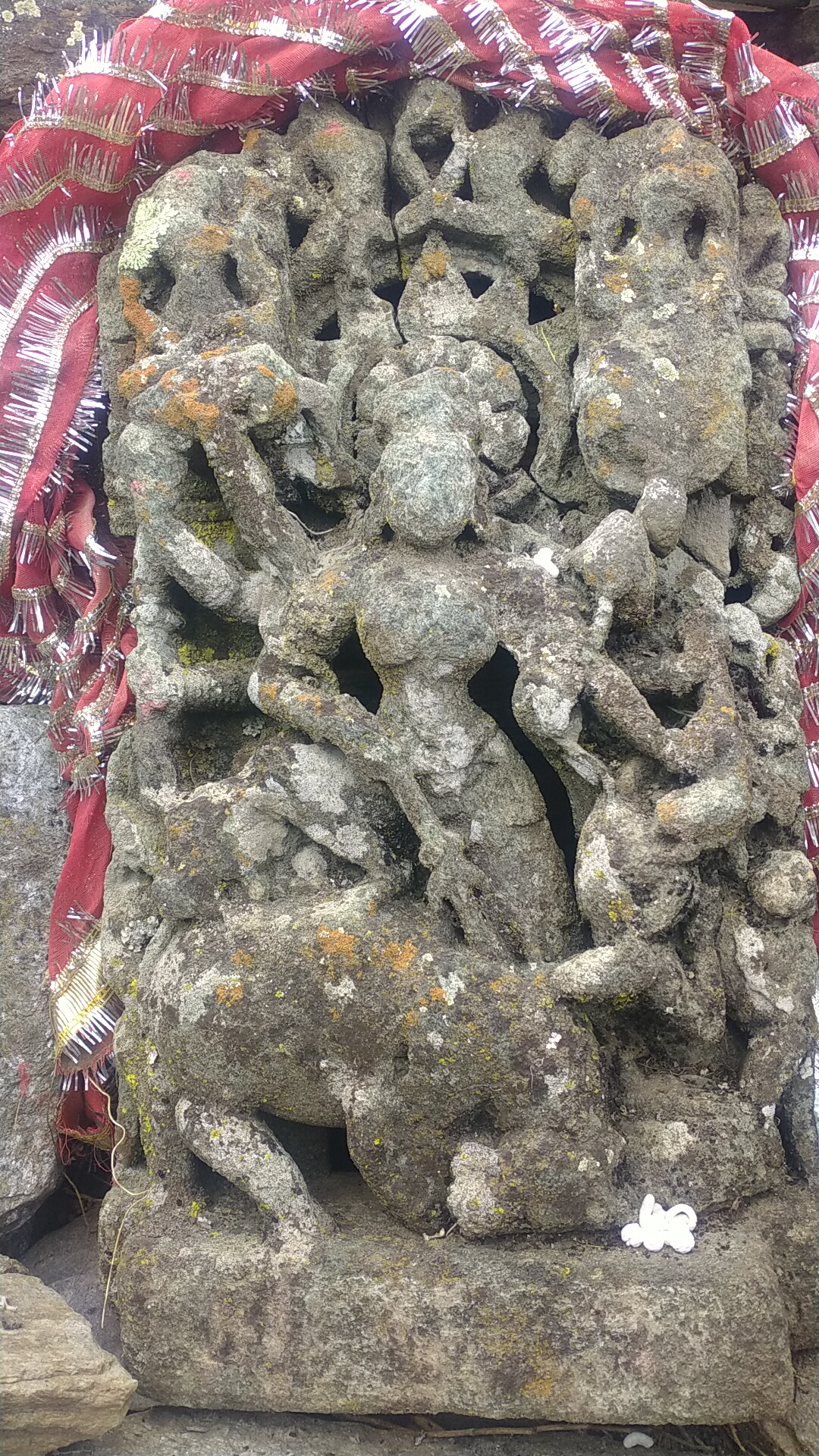
Mahishasurmardini sculpture in hatkoti 10th C.E

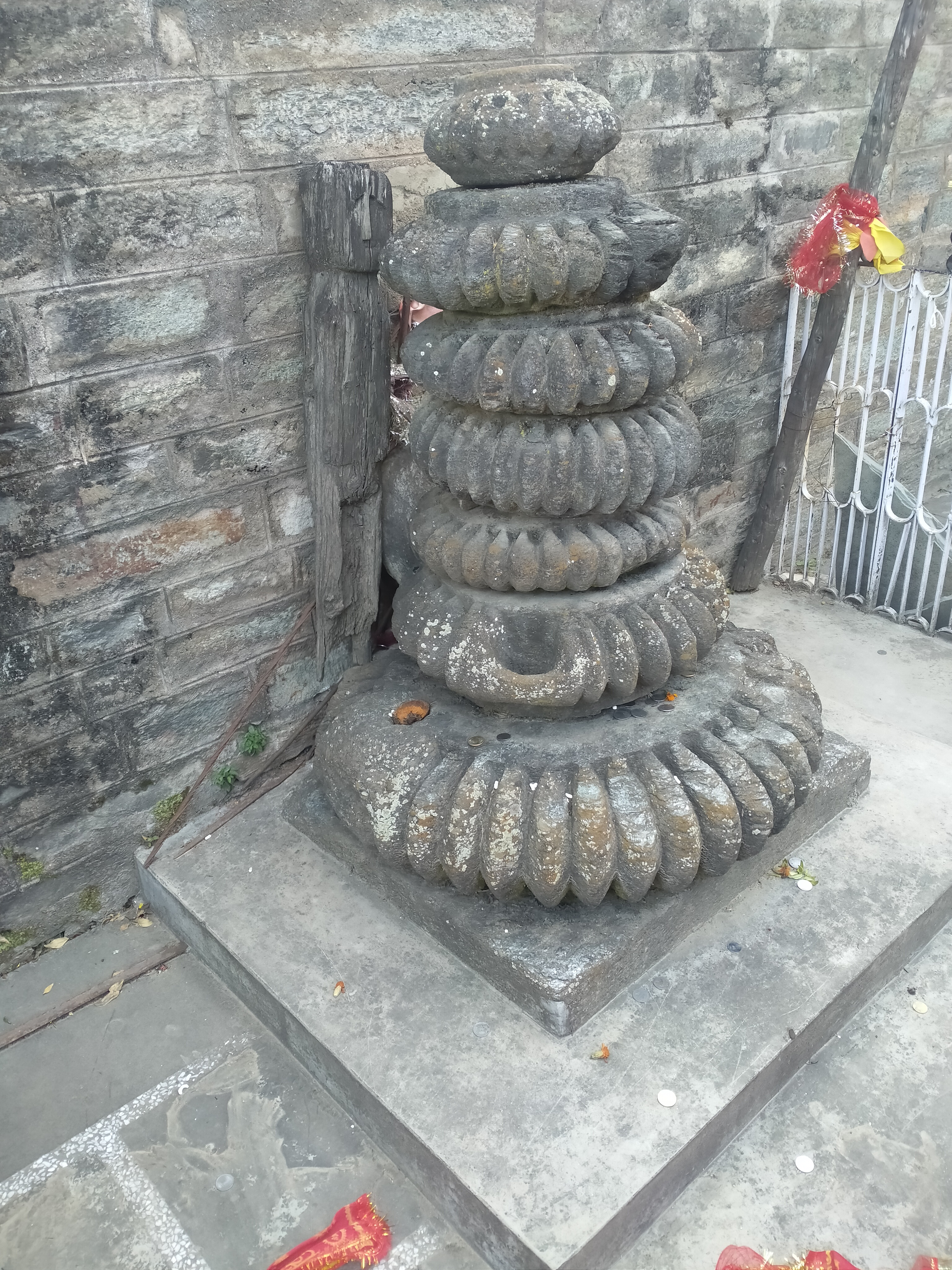
Amalaka in Hatkoti

Hatkoti temples date back to the period between the eighth to the ninth century CE, the Gurjara-Pratihara Period in Indian history. Parallels of these can also be found in the Balag Village in Theog Tehsil and the Hanol Region in Uttrakhand. The temples reflect the beautiful architecture of that era and were most likely built during the Pratihara Invasion of Kashmir, the route to which passed through the region. The architecture and design of Hatkoti Temple was originally in the classical Shikhara or tower style. The Shikhara style represents ancient structures that are conical or narrow at the top and have a wide base at the bottom. The walls of the temples are carved with ornate sculptures and speak volumes of the architectural designs of the eras in which they were created.

== Geography ==
Hatkoti is located at 31.131°N 77.744°E. It has an average elevation of 1,442. Two mountain streams Bishkulti and Raanvati joins the Pabbar River in Hatkoti.

== Transportation ==
Hatkoti is well connected to Himachal and rest of India through National Highway 707 and National Highway 705.

== See also ==
- Rohru
- Jubbal
- Tikkar
