= Jahu, Himachal Pradesh =

Village in Himachal Pradesh, India

Jahu
- Village
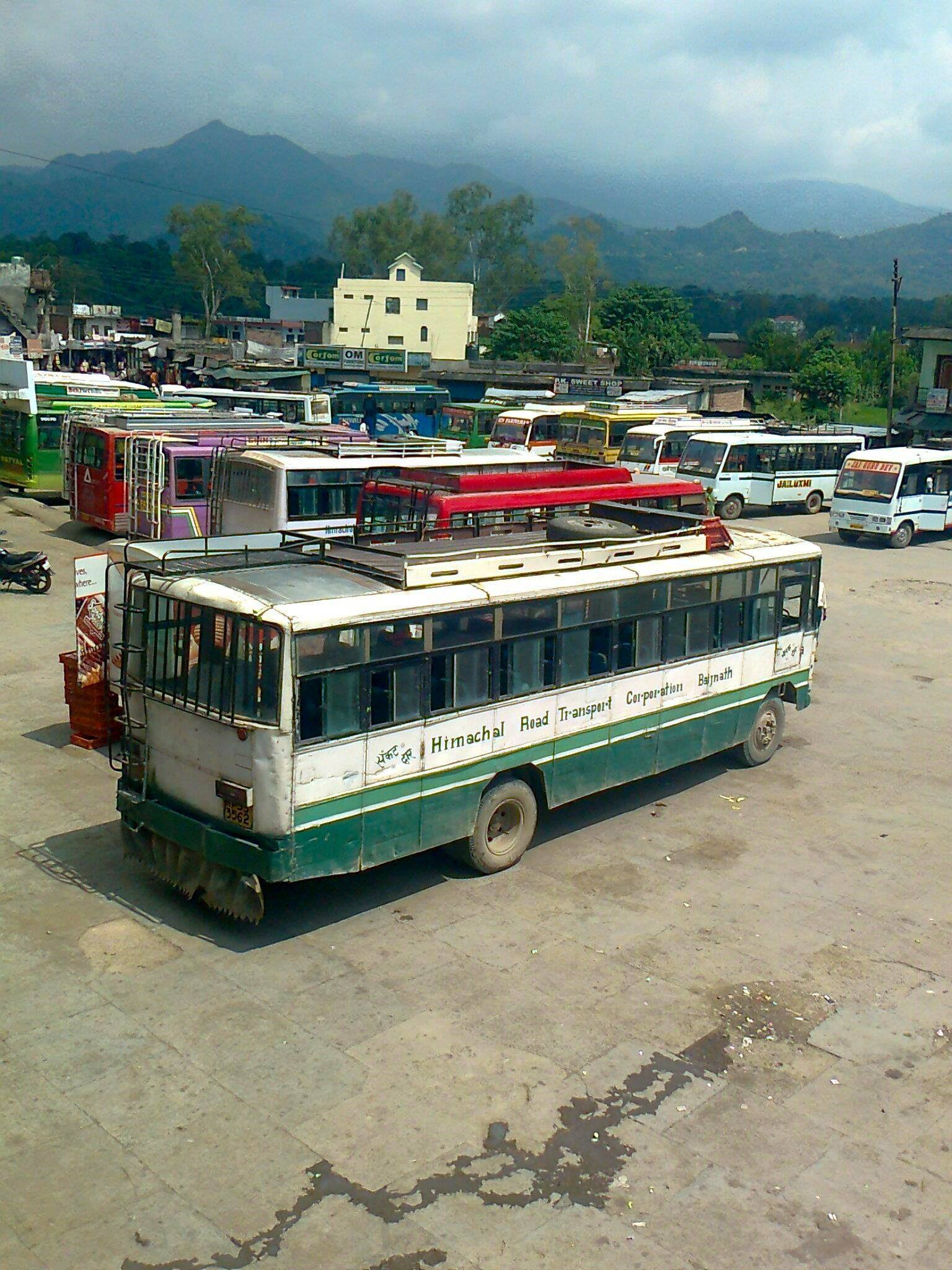
- Jahu bus stand

- Location within Himachal Pradesh
- Coordinates: 31°35′23″N 76°43′27″E
- Country: India
- State: Himachal Pradesh
- District: Hamirpur
- Village: Jahu
- Talukas: Bhoranj
- Elevation: 1,189 m (3,901 ft)

Population (2011)
  - Total: 2,663

Languages
  - Official: Hindi
- Time zone: UTC+5:30 (IST)
- Pin Code: 176 048
- Precipitation: 1,411 millimetres (55.6 in)
- Avg. annual temperature: 21.9 °C (71.4 °F)

Jahu (also called Jahu Bhoranj) is a village panchayat in Bhoranj tehsil, of the Hamirpur district, Himachal Pradesh, India. Jahu is on a trijunction of Hamirpur, Bilaspur and Mandi districts.

The people of Jahu use Hindi and Pahadi language for communication.

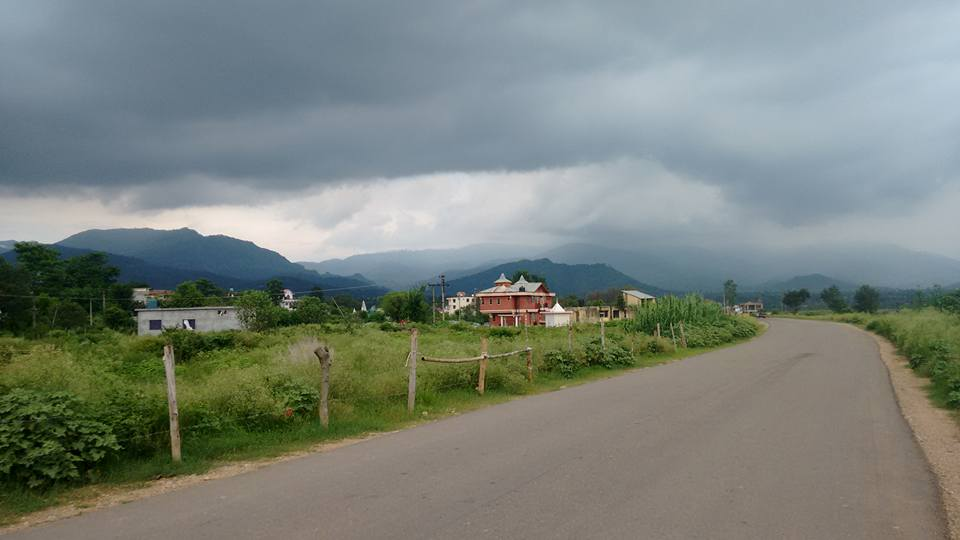
A Jahu view from state highway 32, showing area near Jahu police station

== Economy ==
Agriculture is the major economic driver of Jahu, however people are also involved in manufacturing and various trading businesses. Fishing is also an economy driver of Jahu.

== The area, nearby cities ==
Jahu is an emerging small town. The nearest major town is Sarkaghat. Bhota is 23 kilometres (14 mi) west, and Jahu is 36 kilometres (22 mi) east of Hamipur, and 131 kilometres (81 mi) from Shimla,

To the north, 103 kilometres (64 mi) is Palampur, to the east, 25 kilometres (16 mi) is Rewalsar Lake (see also Rewalsar, India), and 134 kilometres (83 mi) to the west is Hoshiarpur.

Jahu Khurd is 2 kilometres (1.2 mi) south.

Big cities close to Jahu are Hamirpur, 36 kilometres (22 mi) west, Sundarnagar at 37 kilometres (23 mi), Mandi at 47 kilometres (29 mi), and Nangal at 111 kilometres (69 mi). Talai is 57 kilometres (35 mi) northwest, Ghumarwin is 28 kilometres (17 mi) south. Jogindernagar is 76 kilometres (47 mi) north. Bilaspur is 44 kilometres (27 mi) southwest, as Pandoh, by Pandoh Dam, is 65 kilometres (40 mi) northeast.

=== Nearby tehsils ===
Several tehsils are near Jahu. To the west is Hamirpur Tehsil, and to the south Ghumarwin, to the south east Baldwara Tehsil, and to the south is Bijhri Tehsil, and to the north are Bamson Tehsil and Dharampur Tehsil.

== People from Jahu ==
Kangana Ranaut, a Bollywood actress, did her primary education in Bhambla near Jahu.

== The Area ==
Jahu is near Gobind Sagar, a reservoir on the Sutlej river, which flows south of town. The Beas Satluj Link Project is northeast, as is Prashar Lake.

The confluence of the Sunail Khad and the Seer Khad is just south of Jahu. The Sunail Khad flows west of Jahu. The Seer Khad flows into the Sutlej.

The source of the Beas River is just west.

== Access to and from ==
Jahu has bus service. The nearest railways station is Nangal Dam railway station, near Nangal in Punjab, also near Bhakra Dam. The nearest airport is Bhuntar Airport. Buses are also available at specific timings to major cities like Dharamshala, Shimla, Chandigarh and Manali.

== Other information ==
People of Jahu are friendly and helpful. Jahu has a well developed infrastructure but during the Flood in 2014, a bridge on the Seer Khad collapsed, and three people were washed downstream.
