= Talai =

- Town
- Nickname: Biru
- Location in Himachal Pradesh, India Talai (India)
- Coordinates: 31.4549154°N 76.5227365°E
- Country: India
- State: Himachal Pradesh
- District: Bilaspur

Population (2011)
  - Total: 2,372

Languages
  - Official: Hindi
  - Regional: Bilaspuri
- Time zone: UTC+5:30 (IST)

Talai is a town and a nagar panchayat in Bilaspur district in the Indian state of Himachal Pradesh.

== Demographics ==
As of the 2001 India census, Talai had a population of 2010 of which males constituted 53% and females 47%. The town's average literacy rate of 71% is higher than the national average of 59.5%: male literacy is 75%, and female literacy is 68%. In Talai, 15% of the population is under 6 years of age. There are three temples dedicated to Baba Balak Nath. It has four schools, three hospitals, a police station, a cricket ground (under construction), four banks and two ATM. Although there is no bus stop, the town has a dozen small hotels and restaurants along with more than 100 Shops.
