= Mehli =

- village
- Location in Punjab, India Mehli (India)
- Coordinates: 31°12′45″N 75°48′30″E
- Country: India
- State: Punjab
- District: Nawanshahr

Government
  - Type: Panchayati raj (India)
  - Body: Gram panchayat

Languages
  - Official: Punjabi
- Time zone: UTC+5:30 (IST)
- Vehicle registration: PB-
- Coastline: 0 kilometres (0 mi)

Mehli is a village in the Nawanshahr district of Punjab, India, that is located on the south-east edge of Phagwara city. According to the Census figures in 2001, the total population of this village was 3227.
