= Himachal Pradesh Public Works Department =

Himachal Pradesh Public Works Department, commonly abbreviated as HPPWD, is a department of Government of Himachal Pradesh entrusted with the responsibility of planning, construction and maintenance of roads, bridges, ropeways and government buildings in Himachal Pradesh state.
