= National Highway 707 (India) =

National highway in India

National Highway 707
- Map of National Highway 707 in red

Route information
- Length: 151 km (94 mi)

Major junctions
- From: Hatkoti
- To: Paonta Sahib

Location
- Country: India
- States: Himachal Pradesh, Uttarakhand
- Primary destinations: Minus-Tiuni, Minas, Shillai, Rajban

Highway system
- Roads in India; Expressways; National; State; Asian
← NH 705	→ NH 7

National Highway 707 (NH 707) starts from Hatkoti and ends at Paonta Sahib, both places in the state of Himachal Pradesh. On its way to Paonta Sahib it travels through the Indian state of Uttarakhand. The highway is 151 km (94 mi) long. It passes through towns of Sataun, Kamrau, Kaffota, Chareu, Shillai, Shiri kyari,vicky Rohnat in the state of Himachal Prasdesh.

== See also ==
- List of national highways in India
- National Highways Development Project
