= Jubbal =

- Tehsil
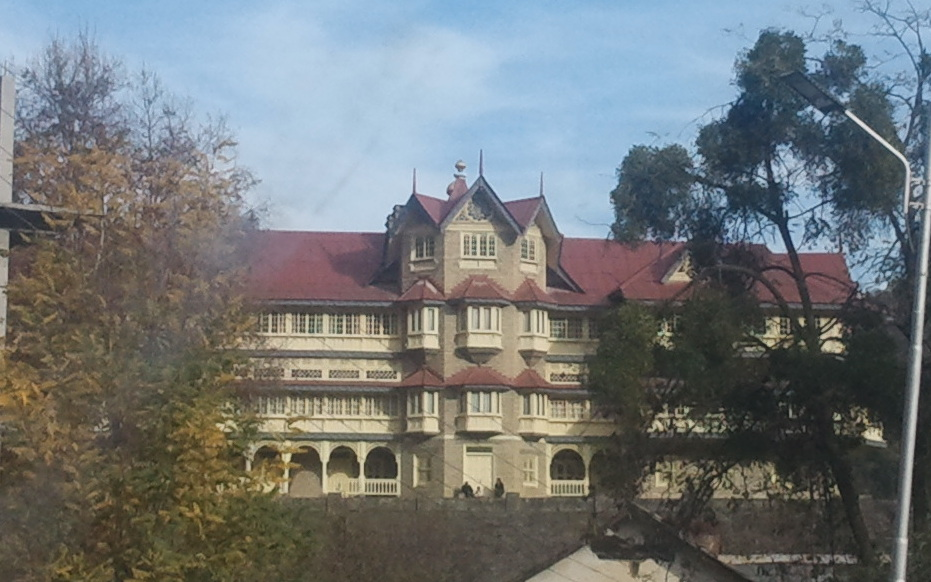
- Jubbal Palace

- Location in Himachal Pradesh, India Jubbal (India)
- Coordinates: 31.1094667°N 77.6629967°E
- Country: India
- State: Himachal Pradesh
- District: Shimla
- Founder: Raja Ugar Chand
- Elevation: 1,901 m (6,237 ft)

Population (2011)
  - Total: 37,682

Languages
  - Official: Hindi
  - Regional: Mahasu Pahari (Brari)
- Time zone: UTC+5:30 (IST)
- Postal code: 171205
- Vehicle registration: HP-75

Jubbal is a tehsil, town and a nagar panchayat in Shimla district in the Indian state of Himachal Pradesh which shares its boundary with the state of Uttrakhand towards south-east. Jubbal is recognised as a major apple-producing area in Shimla district along with Kotgarh, Rohru, Kotkhai and Chopal. It is famous for its Hindu temples, picturesque mountains and its royal palace situated in the town.

== Geography ==
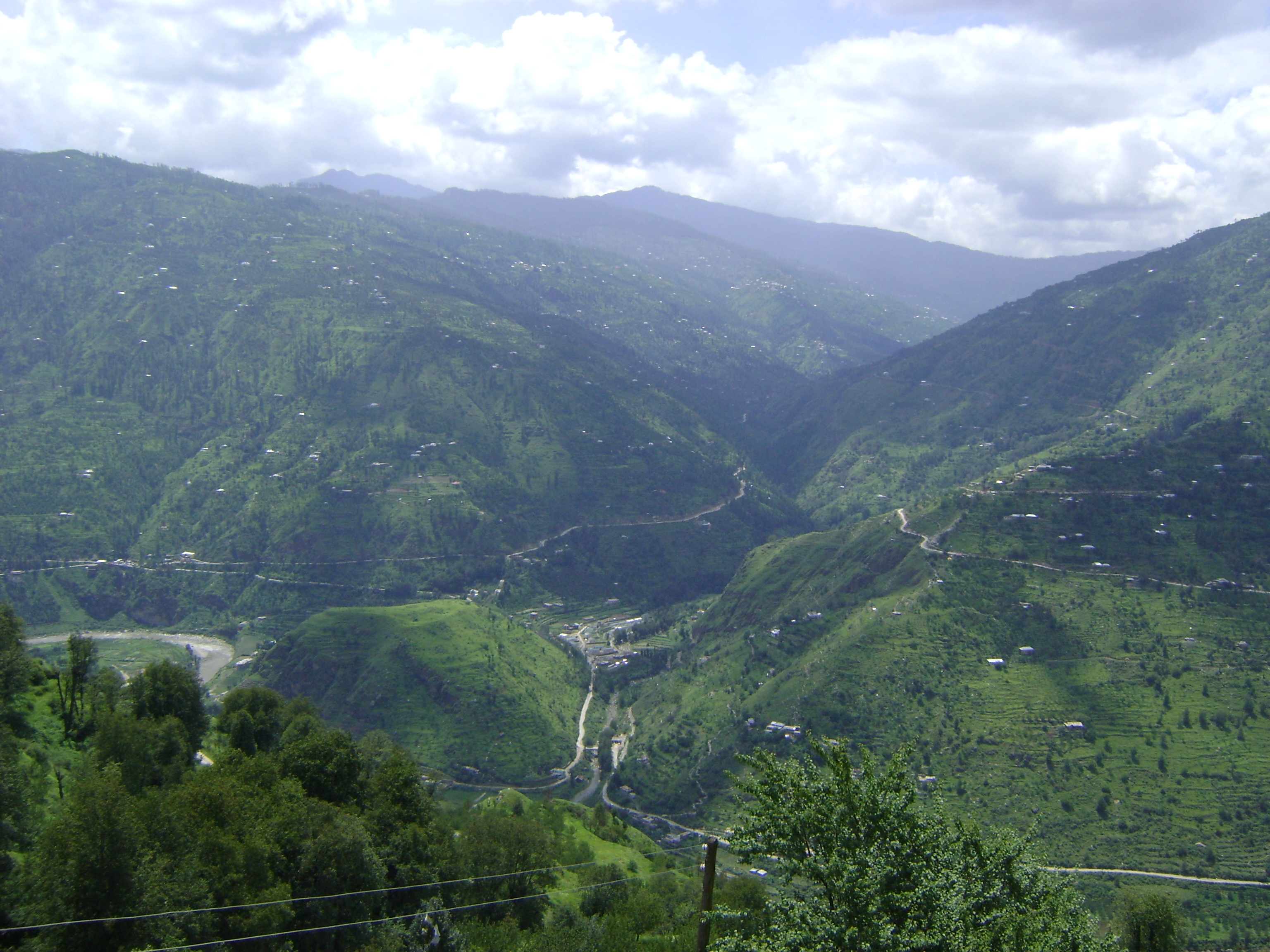
Jubbal

Jubbal, located at 31.1094667°N 77.6629967°E has an average elevation of 2200 metres (7220 feet). A small hill town, it is famous for its apple orchards and the Jubbal Palace. Jubbal has a combination of vast landscapes, thick woods, and buildings. It is located at an elevation of 1901 meters.

== History ==
The history of Jubbal State goes back to the 12th century. Among the 18 Thakuries located in the valleys of Sutlej, Pabbar and Giri, this Thakurai was of considerable importance. Rulers of Jubbal belonged to the Rathore clan. During the 12th century, Ugar Chand, the Raja of Sirmoor State, had a summer palace in Soonpur, modern-day Hatkoti, which is overlooked by the plateau of Sonnpur, on the right bank of the Pabbar river. While he was having pleasant company with his family, he had to go back to Sirmaur, leaving the royal family behind. Due to heavy rainfall river Giri got flooded and capital of the state was swept away and the royal family lost its ancestral possessions the Sirmur State forever to a prince of Jaisalmer.

The princely state of Jubbal was founded in 1800. It was occupied by Nepal from 1803 to 1815 and by the British from 1832 to 1840. The rulers who belonged to the Rathore clan took the title of Rana. The last ruler, Rana Baghat Chandra, took the title of Raja in 1918.

Amongst all the rulers, Rana Karam Chand was the most aggressive; after being granted full ruling powers in 1854 started the expansionist approach by burning down the Kotis (large palatial wooden houses) and killing the local chieftains of the nearby adjoining areas, mainly Bushahar state. The most important massacre was the burning down of 14 houses of the Khadola clan of nearby Kaina village, which belonged to the Bushahar state. It was predominantly a warrior clan owning hundreds of acres of land, and one day Rana Karam Chand got the news that the Khoonds (warriors) of the Kaina village had large reserves of food, silver, and gold. One fine day he sent his ministers to see whether the information was correct or not. To his surprise, when the ministers came back from Kaina, they brought down silverware with them in which they had eaten food. As a token of gratitude, they were given every piece of silverware on which they had eaten their food. Seeing this, Rana got angry and, at the stroke of midnight, burnt down all 14 houses of the Khadola clan. Only a single member of their clan survived.

Jubbal State had an area of 288 square miles and was famous for its dense forests of deodar trees. Today, Jubbal is reputed for its apple orchards, which provide its residents with their main source of income. The town of Jubbal is about 100 kilometres from Shimla. The prominent devi devtas of this region are Devta Banad, Devta Deshmolya, Devta Mahasu, Hateshwari Mata and Devta Nageshwar, with some villages even in Rohru tehsil.

Jubbal has also given the state of Himachal Pradesh a Chief Minister. Ram Lal Thakur of Barthata village was the Chief Minister from 1975 to 1977 and again from 1980 to 1982.

=== Rulers of Jubbal State ===
The rulers of the princely state of Jubbal were:

- .... - 1803 : Purana Chandra
- 1803 - 1815 : Nepalese Occupation
- 1815 - 1832 : Purana Chandra (return to power)
- 1832 - 1840 : British Occupation
- 1840 : Purana Chandra (3rd time)
- 1840 - 1877 : Rubin Kazan Chandra
- 1877 - 1898 : Padma Chandra (b. ... - d. 1898)
- 1898 - 29 Apr 1910 : Gyan Chandra (b. ... - d. 1910)

== Demographics ==
Pahari is the native language here. Hindi and English are the official languages and are also spoken here.

== Climate ==
Jubbal shows wide and sweeping variations in its landscape, ranging from lush green and thick woods to dry lands bereft of vegetation. The valley is also famous for its apple orchards. The region is generally cool throughout the year with temperatures ranging from 15 degrees to 30 °C during the summer and falling below zero degrees during the winter. The winters are especially harsh and snowfall is frequent.

== Tourism ==
Hatkoti Temple, Gurjara Pratihara, Jubbal, Himachal Pradesh.

The Raoli Paand (Divine Kitchen) of Chalda Mahasu Temple, Saraji, Jubbal

Major attractions in Jubbal include the namesake Jubbal Palace, the Hateshwari mata temple, Chunjar peek, apple lodges of Badhal, Chhajpur, Nandpur region and Mahasu devta temple Hanol of Tiuni which is just 38 km from Jubaal town. The Jubbal Palace is best known for its architecture and citadel. A part of the palace, called the Rana's abode, is built in Chinese style with suspended attics and structures carved out of deodar timber. The modern wing of the palace has an Indo-European design and feel with convoluted wooden ceilings and the works. This palace which was the residence of the ruling Jubbal family has been turned into a heritage spot now.

The Hateshwari temple, is a two storied pagoda style structure believed to have been built by the Pandavas. Constructed around 800-1000 AD, the temple was renovated by the Jubbal rulers in the 19th century; the main idol of Hatkeshwari and the inner sanctum sanctorum were barely affected though.

== Getting there ==
Traveling to Jubbal by road is the most preferred mode, because many state owned buses ply from Shimla to Jubbal. Buses and cabs are available for travel within the city. Private vehicles are also available from Shimla to Jubbal for moderate prices around 1000-2000 INR. The nearest narrow gauge railway line is at Shimla again, which is connected to Delhi by train. Shimla airport provides direct flights to New Delhi.

== See also ==
Nearby Cities and Towns :-

- Rohru
- Hatkoti
- Sawra
- Kotkhai
