= Dadasiba =

Dadasiba Dada Dada
- Village
- Location in Himachal Pradesh, India
- Coordinates: 31°56′N 76°05′E
- Country: India
- State: Himachal Pradesh
- District: Kangra
- Elevation: 503 m (1,650 ft)

Population (2001)
  - Total: 4,336

Languages
  - Official: Pahari
- Time zone: UTC+5:30 (IST)
- PIN: 177 106
- Telephone code: 01970
- Vehicle registration: HP 36

Dadasiba, also Dada Siba, is a village in the Kangra district of Himachal Pradesh, India. A government industrial training institute is based there. Dadasiba's postal code is 177106 and the people of Dadasiba village use the Pahari language for communication.

There is a Radha Krishna temple, which was built by Raja Ram Singh of the Sibai (or Sapehiya) clan, known for its murals, dating back about two hundred years to a time when the village was the centre of an independent state. One of the palaces of Raja Ram Singh is also situated in this village.

There is one more temples in this area named the Baba Bharthari temple situated in Gurnwar sub-village of the Dada Siba tehsil. It is on the top of a hill in the middle of the forest.

The winter season is moderately cold with an average temperature of 8–14 °C but the summer season is quite hot with temperatures touching 42 °C.
