= Theog =

- Town
- Theog
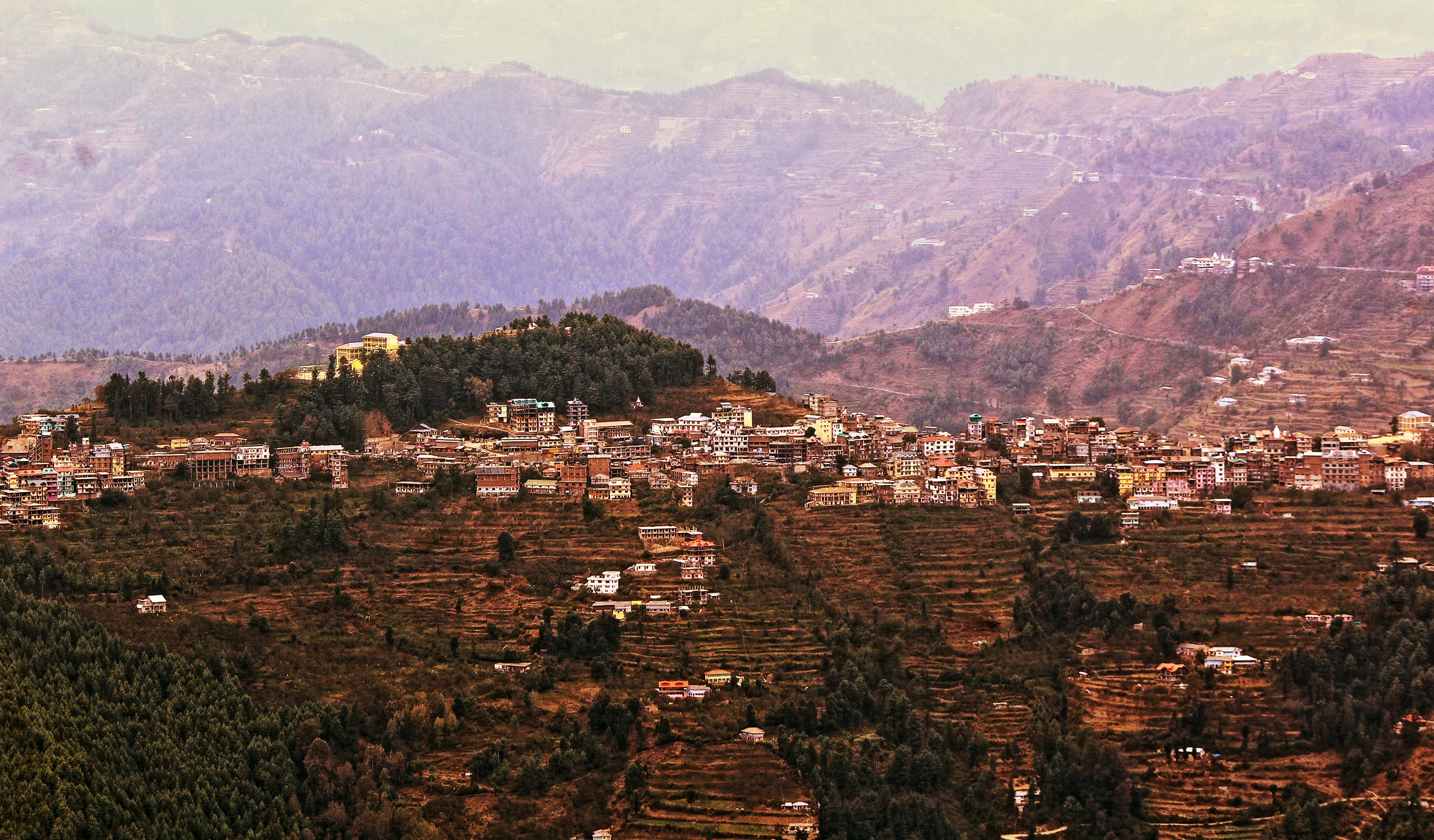

- Location in Himachal Pradesh, India Theog (India)
- Coordinates: 31.12°N 77.35°E
- Country: India
- State: Himachal Pradesh
- District: Shimla

Government
  - MLA: Kuldeep Rathore
- Elevation: 2,310 m (7,580 ft)

Population (2011)
  - Total: 4,353

Languages
  - Official: Hindi
  - Regional: Mahasu Pahari
- Time zone: UTC+5:30 (IST)
- PIN: 171201
- Telephone code: 91 1783 xxxxxx
- Vehicle registration: HP-09

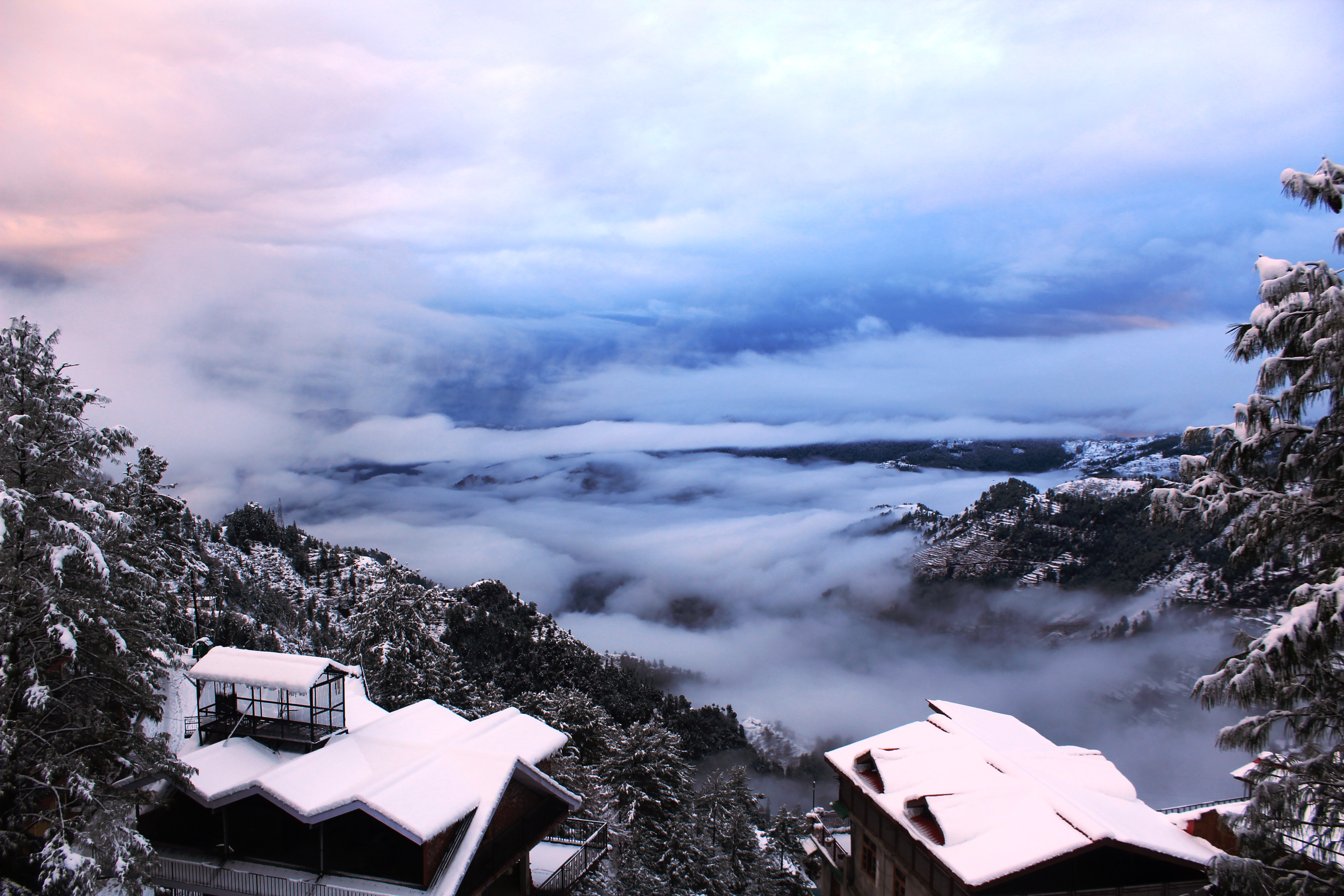
Theog in winter

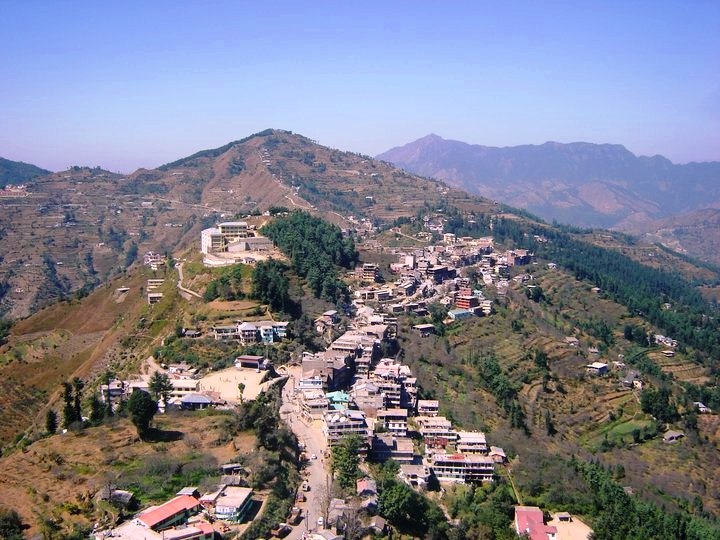
Theog

Theog is a town and a municipal committee as well as a tehsil in Shimla district in the Indian state of Himachal Pradesh. It is 28 kilometres (17 mi) from state capital Shimla. First settlements were in 1902.

== Demographics ==
As of 2011 India census, Theog had a population of 84684. Males constitute 51% of the population and females 49%. Theog has an average literacy rate of 75%; male literacy is 80.7%, and female literacy is 69.4%. In Theog, 10.6% of the population is under 6 years of age. According to the census of 1931, the total population of Theog state was 6912; there were 6800 Hindus, 91 Muslims and 21 Sikhs in Theog State in 1931.

== Geography ==
Theog is located at 31.12°N 77.35°E. It has an average elevation of 1965 metres (6446 feet). It is situated on National Highway NH22 (on the Hindustan-Tibet Road), is 32 km away from Shimla, and is a town of five 'Ghats' (or ridges): Rahi Ghat, Deori Ghat, Prem Ghat, Janoghat, and Bagaghat.

Numerous villages come under the jurisdiction of Theog. Diksha is the new sarpanch from Sarog Gali village

== Villages ==
- Jaiee

== Transport ==
Theog is well connected to Himachal and rest of India through National Highway 5 and National Highway 705. Theog is 45 km from Shimla airport and 32 km from Shimla railway station.

== See also ==
- Theog-Kumarsain (Vidhan Sabha constituency)
