= Shimla district =

- District of Himachal Pradesh
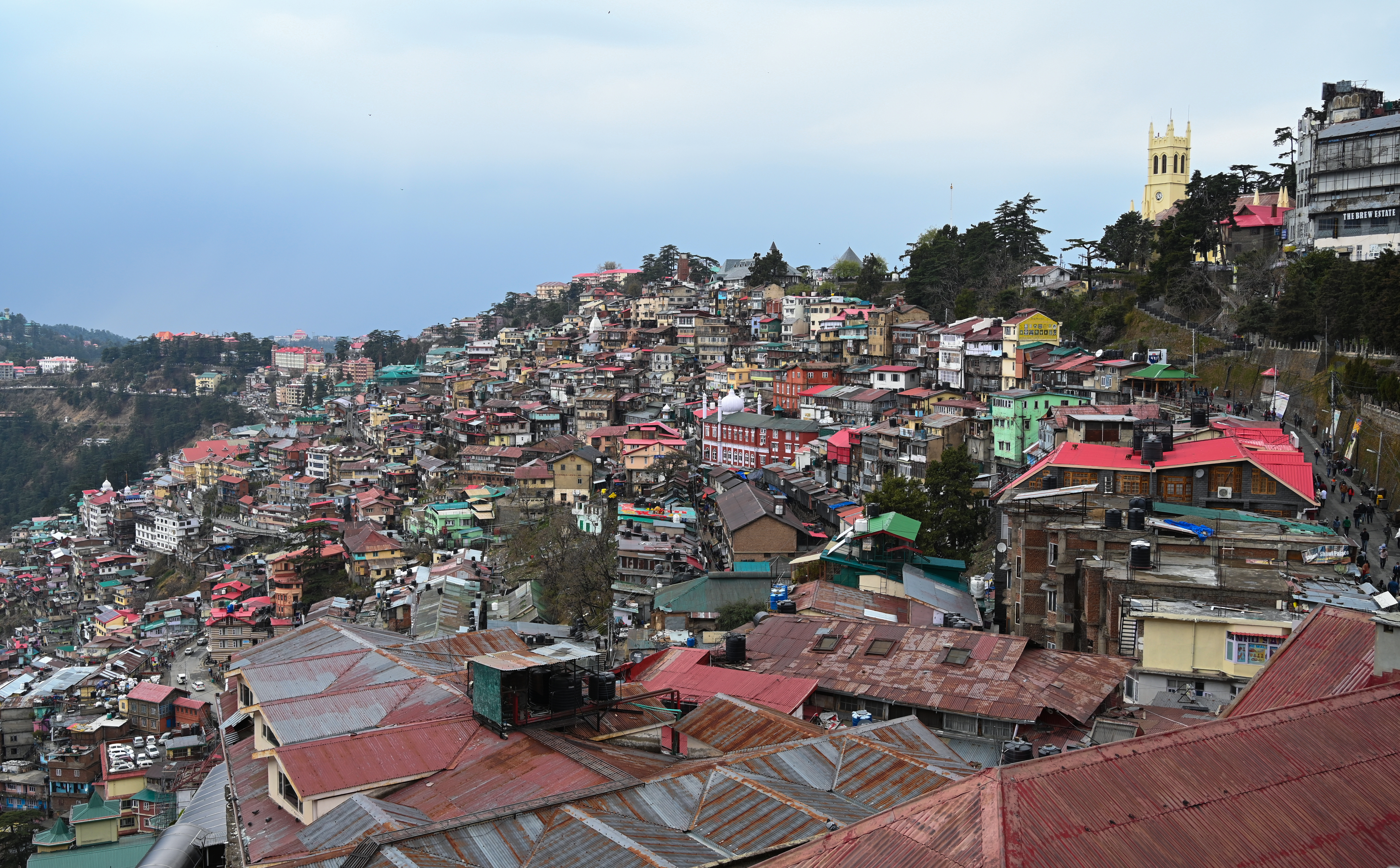
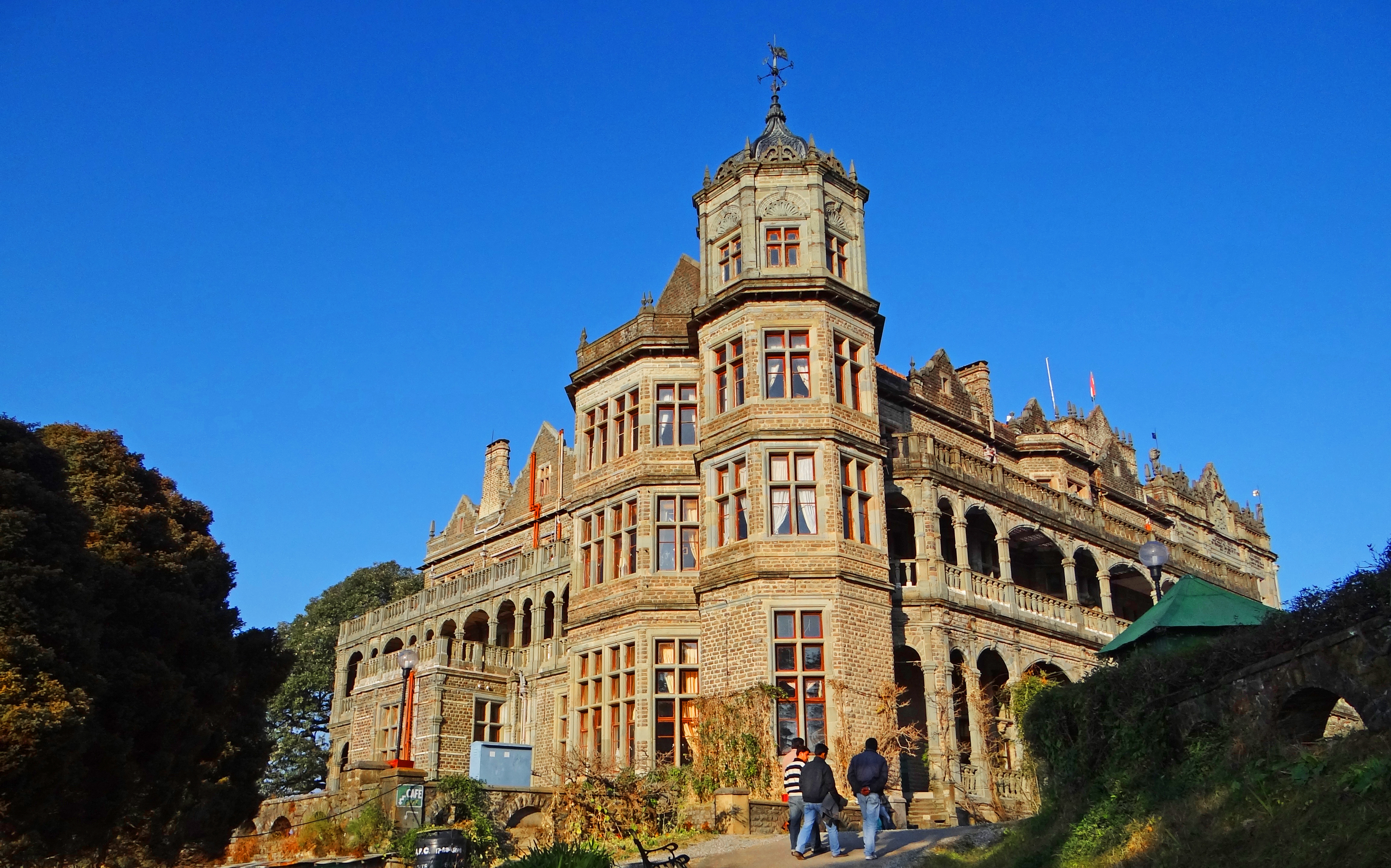
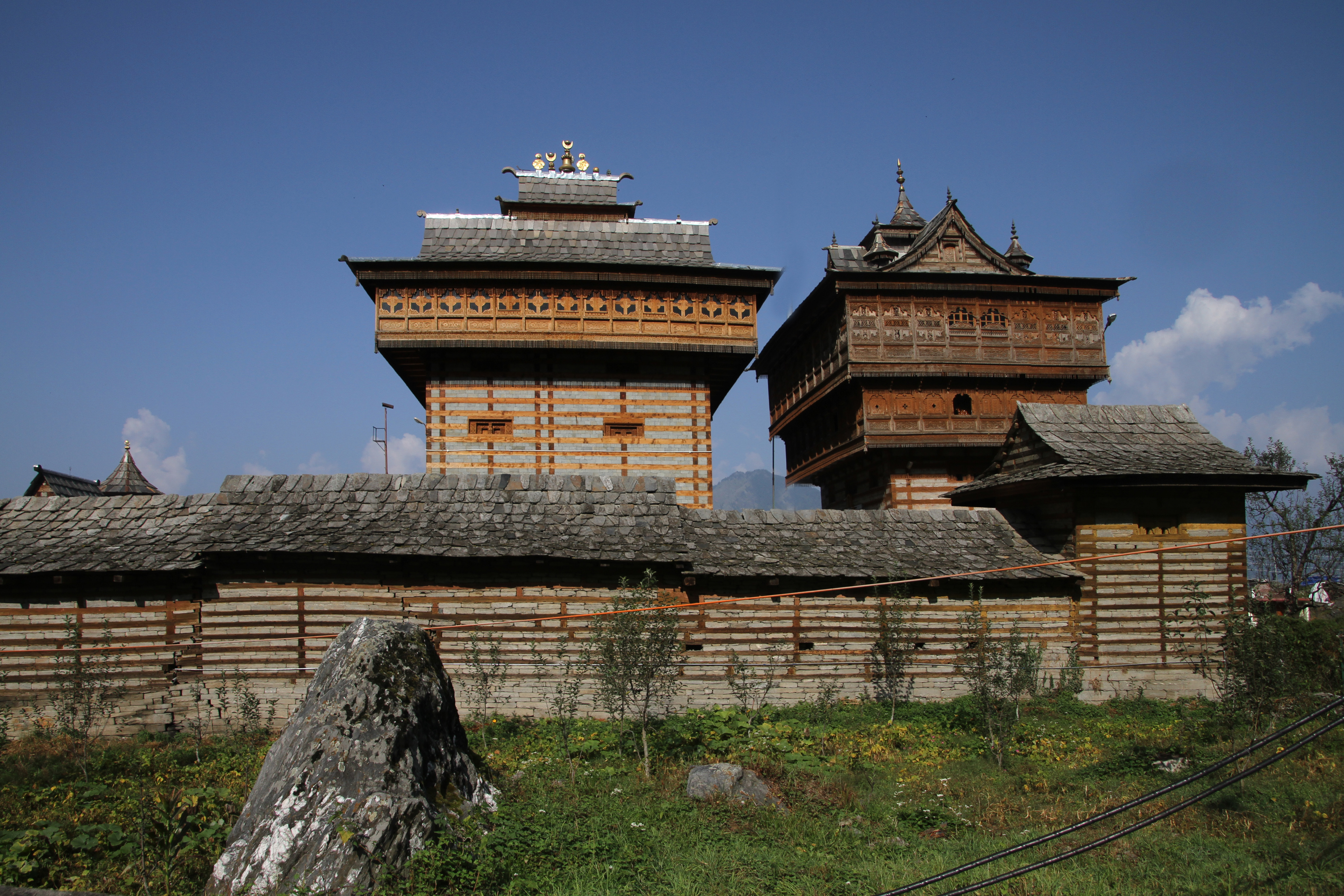
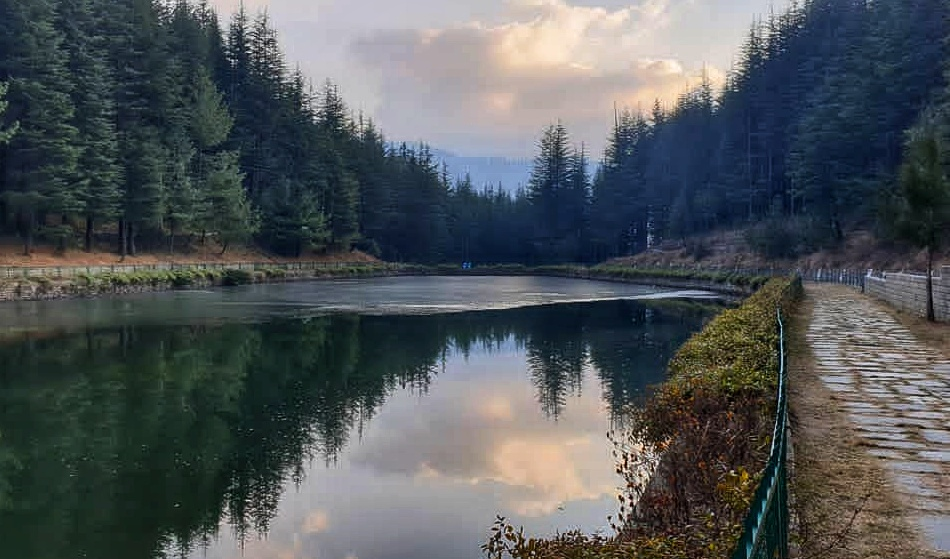
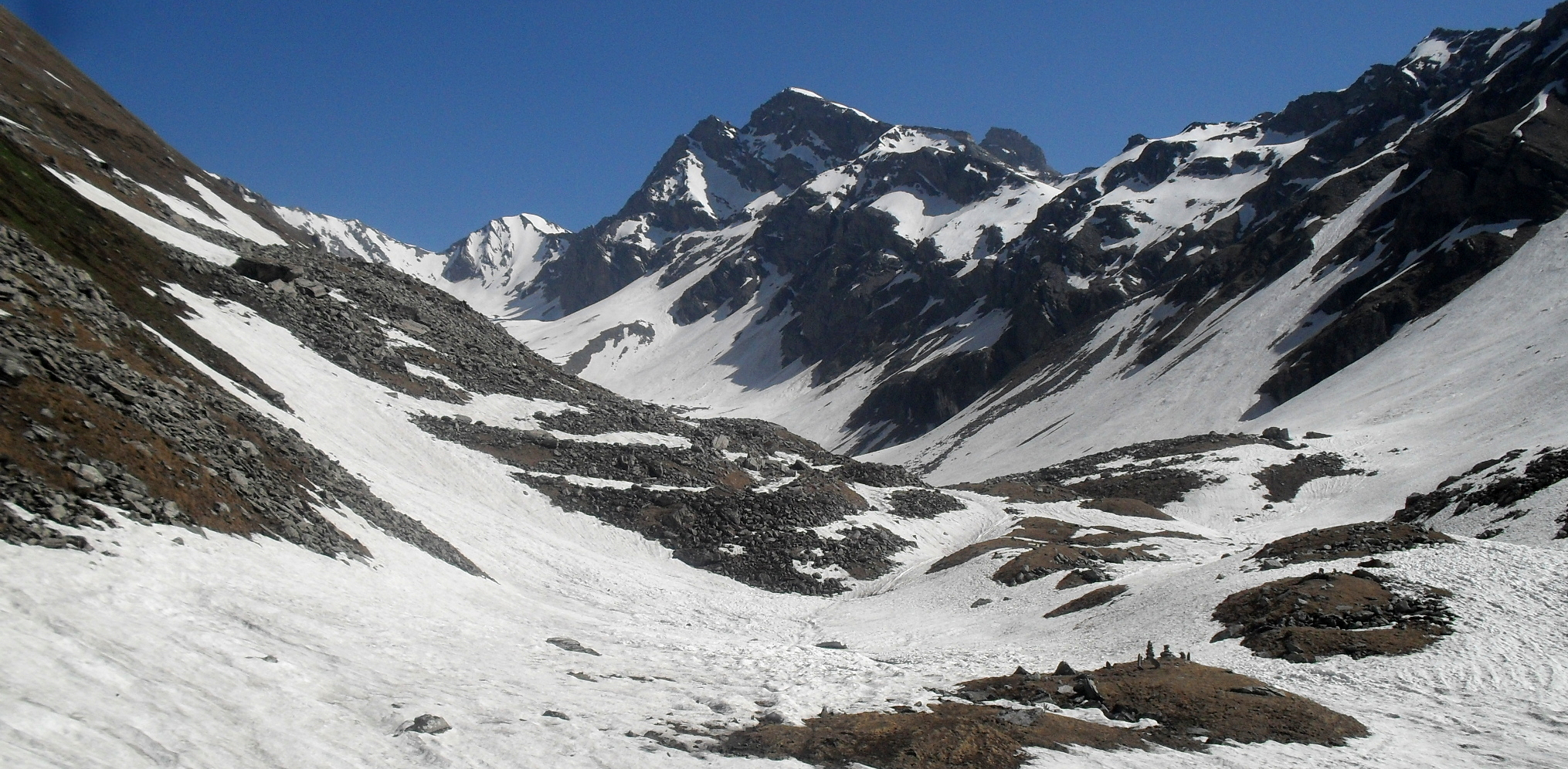
- Clockwise from top-left: Shimla City, Rashtrapati Niwas, Tani Jubbar Lake near Narkanda, Chandranahan Sangla Pass, Bhimakali Temple at Sarahan
- Nickname: The Queen of Hills
- Shimla district Location in Himachal Pradesh
- Country: India
- State: Himachal Pradesh
- Headquarters: Shimla

Government
  - Deputy Commissioner: Anupam Kashyap, IAS
  - Superintendent of Police: Sanjay Gandhi, IPS
  - Lok Sabha Constituencies: Shimla
  - Vidhan. Sabha Constituencies: Shimla; Shimla Rural; Rampur; Kasumpti; Theog; Jubbal-Kotkhai; Rohru; Chopal

Area
  - Total: 5,131 km^{2} (1,981 sq mi)

Population (2011)
  - Total: 814,010
  - Rank: 3rd
  - Density: 158.6/km^{2} (410.9/sq mi)

Languages
  - Official: Hindi
  - Regional: Mahasu Pahari

Demographics
  - Sex ratio: 916
  - Literacy: 84.55
  - Literacy: male: 90.73
  - Literacy: female: 77.80
- Time zone: UTC+5:30 (IST)
- Postal code: 171xxx
- Area code: 91 177 xxxxxxx
- ISO 3166 code: IN-HP
- Largest city: Shimla
- Climate: ETh (Köppen)
- Precipitation: 1,520 millimetres (60 in)
- Avg. annual temperature: 17 °C (63 °F)
- Avg. summer temperature: 22 °C (72 °F)
- Avg. winter temperature: 4 °C (39 °F)
- Website: hpshimla.nic.in/welcome.asp

Shimla district, known as Simla district until 1972, is one of the twelve districts of the state of Himachal Pradesh in northern India. Its headquarters is the state capital of Shimla. Neighbouring districts are Mandi and Kullu in the north, Kinnaur in the east, Uttarakhand in the southeast, Solan to the southwest and Sirmaur in the south. The elevation of the district ranges from 987 metres (3,238 ft) to 4,500 metres (14,764 ft). Shimla district culturally is part of the Mahasu region.

As of 2011, it is the third most populated district of Himachal Pradesh (out of 12), after Kangra and Mandi. It is the most urbanized district of Himachal Pradesh.

== Administrative structure ==
Sl. No.	Particulars	Description
1	Geographical Area	5,131 km^{2}
2	Area (out of total area) of H.P.	9.22%
3	Sub-Divisions	Total = 11: Shimla Urban; Shimla Rural; Theog; Chaupal; Rampur; Rohru; Kumarsain; Dodra-Kawar; Jubbal; Kupvi; Kotkhai
4	Tehsils	Total = 17: Rampur; Kumarsain; Seoni; Shimla Urban; Shimla Rural; Theog; Chaupal; Jubbal; Kotkhai; Rohru; Chirgaon; Dodra-Kawar; Nerwa; Kupvi; Nankhari; Tikkar; Junga
5	Sub-Tehsils	Total = 9: Taklech (Rampur); Sarahan (Rampur); Deha (Theog); Kotgarh (Kumarsain); Dhami (Shimla(R)); Jalog (Seoni); Jangla (Chirgaon); Saraswati Nagar (Jubbal); Kalbog (Kotkhai)
6	Towns	(10) Shimla, Rampur, Kumarsain, Narkanda, Theog, Seoni, Chaupal, Kotkhai, Jubbal, Rohru
7	C.D. Blocks	(12) Mashobra, Theog, Chaupal, Rampur, Narkanda, Jubbal, Kotkhai, Rohru, Chohara, Basantpur, Nankhari, Totu, Kupvi
8	Legislative Assembly	(8): Chopal; Theog-Kumarsain; Kasumpati; Shimla; Shimla Rural; Jubbal-Kotkhai; Rampur; Rohru.
9	Villages	2,914
10	Inhabited	2,520
11	Uninhabited	394
12	Density	159 person per km^{2}
13	Panchayts	363

== History ==
Shimla district was part of Mahasu district which included Shimla, Solan and Kinnaur districts. Kinnaur was carved out on 1 May 1969 out of Mahasu district and Shimla and Solan districts were made separate districts out of Mahasu district on 1 September 1972. Shimla district was obtained by the British as Mahasu district which included aforementioned districts also in 1815.

== Access ==
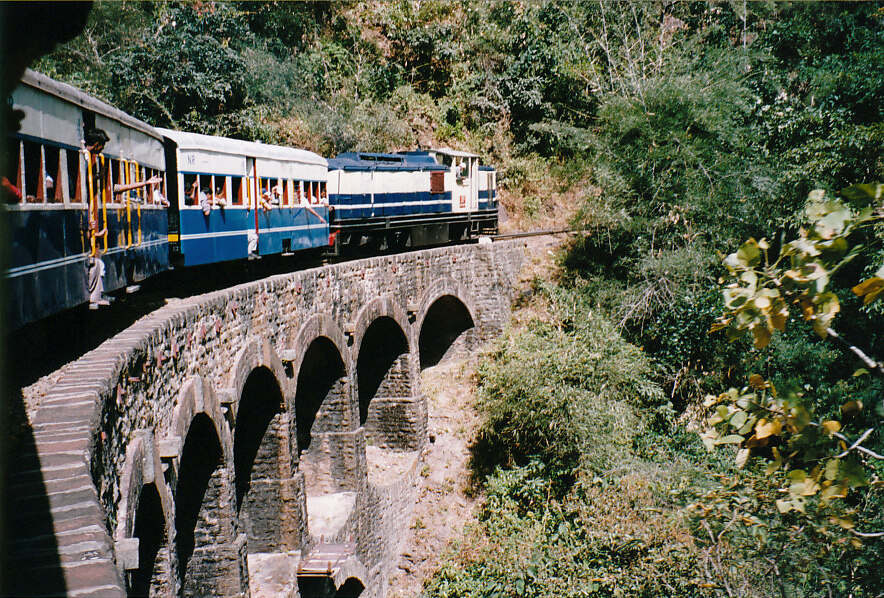
Kalka-Shimla train

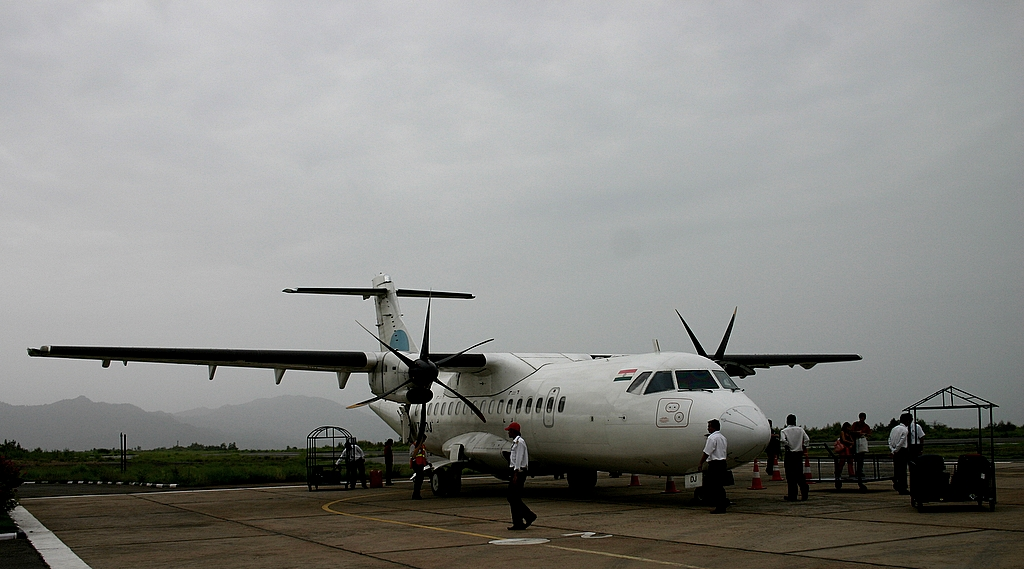
Jubbarhatti Airport

=== By road ===
Shimla is connected by road to all the major towns. Distance between the major towns and Shimla:

- Kalka - 80 km
- Patiala - 172 km
- Chandigarh - 119 km
- Ambala - 166 km
- Delhi - 380 km
- Agra - 568 km
- Amritsar - 342 km
- Jammu (via Pathankot) - 482 km
- Srinagar - 787 km
- Jaipur - 629 km
- Dharmsala (via Mandi) - 290 km
- Dharamsala (via Hamirpur) - 235 km
- Dalhousie - 345 km
- Chamba - 401 km
- Kullu - 235 km
- Manali - 280 km
- Mandi - 153 km
- Palampur - 270 km
- Dehradun - 275 km
- Rampur - 132 km
- Kumarsain - 80 km
- Narkanda - 60 km
- Rohru - 129 km
- Theog - 28 km
- Chaupal - 100 km

== Climate ==
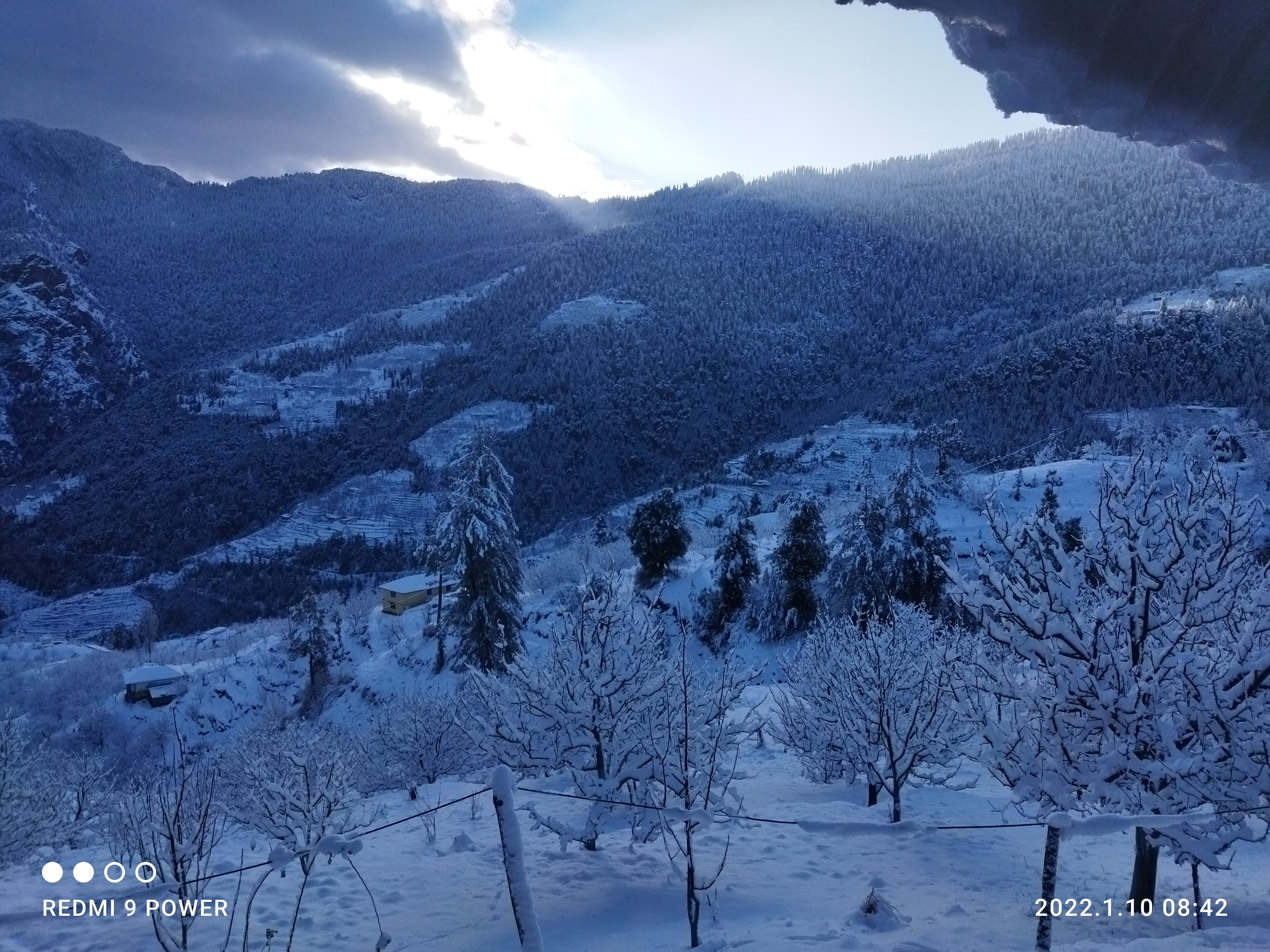
View of Mountains after Snowfall in Shimla

Climate data for Shimla (1951–1980)
Month	Jan	Feb	Mar	Apr	May	Jun	Jul	Aug	Sep	Oct	Nov	Dec	Year
Record high °C (°F)	21.4 (70.5)	22.6 (72.7)	25.8 (78.4)	29.6 (85.3)	32.4 (90.3)	31.5 (88.7)	28.9 (84.0)	27.8 (82.0)	28.6 (83.5)	25.6 (78.1)	23.5 (74.3)	20.5 (68.9)	32.4 (90.3)
Mean daily maximum °C (°F)	8.9 (48.0)	10.6 (51.1)	14.8 (58.6)	19.4 (66.9)	22.9 (73.2)	24.1 (75.4)	21.0 (69.8)	20.2 (68.4)	20.1 (68.2)	23.7 (74.7)	15.1 (59.2)	12.0 (53.6)	17.3 (63.1)
Mean daily minimum °C (°F)	1.7 (35.1)	3.0 (37.4)	6.8 (44.2)	11.1 (52.0)	14.2 (57.6)	15.6 (60.1)	15.0 (59.0)	14.8 (58.6)	13.4 (56.1)	10.7 (51.3)	7.0 (44.6)	4.3 (39.7)	9.8 (49.6)
Record low °C (°F)	−10.6 (12.9)	−8.5 (16.7)	−6.1 (21.0)	−1.3 (29.7)	1.4 (34.5)	7.8 (46.0)	9.4 (48.9)	10.6 (51.1)	5.0 (41.0)	0.2 (32.4)	−1.1 (30.0)	−12.2 (10.0)	−12.2 (10.0)
Average precipitation mm (inches)	54.6 (2.15)	47.2 (1.86)	59.4 (2.34)	41.1 (1.62)	56.4 (2.22)	175.6 (6.91)	376.5 (14.82)	335.1 (13.19)	190.2 (7.49)	46.2 (1.82)	13.8 (0.54)	16.0 (0.63)	1,424.8 (56.09)
Average rainy days	4.7	4.1	5.2	3.6	4.6	10.3	18.3	18.1	9.9	2.9	1.3	1.8	84.8
Source: India Meteorological Department (record high and low up to 2010)

== Demographics ==
Historical population
Year	Pop.	±% p.a.
1901	230,144	—
1911	223,701	−0.28%
1921	228,138	+0.20%
1931	238,280	+0.44%
1941	259,656	+0.86%
1951	286,111	+0.97%
1961	341,461	+1.78%
1971	419,844	+2.09%
1981	510,932	+1.98%
1991	617,404	+1.91%
2001	722,502	+1.58%
2011	814,010	+1.20%

According to the 2011 census, the district had a population of 814,010. This gives it a ranking of 483rd in India (out of a total of 640). The district has a population density of 159 inhabitants per square kilometre (410/sq mi). Its population growth rate over the decade 2001-2011 was 12.67%. Shimla has a sex ratio of 915 females for every 1000 males, and a literacy rate of 83.64%. 24.74% of the population lives in urban areas. Scheduled Castes and Scheduled Tribes make up 26.51% and 1.08% of the population respectively.

=== Religion ===
Religions in Shimla district (2011)
Religion	Percent
Hinduism	97.23%
Islam	1.45%
Sikhism	0.50%
Buddhism	0.40%
Other or not stated	0.42%

Religion in Shimla District
Religion	2011	
Religion	Pop.	%
Hinduism	791,449	97.23%
Islam	11,810	1.45%
Sikhism	4,047	0.5%
Buddhism	3,262	0.4%
Christianity	2,025	0.25%
Jainism	185	0.02%
Others	1,232	0.15%
Total population	814,010	100%

Religious groups in Shimla District (British Punjab province era)
Religious group	1881		1891		1901		1911		1921		1931		1941	
Religious group	Pop.	%	Pop.	%	Pop.	%	Pop.	%	Pop.	%	Pop.	%	Pop.	%
Hinduism (Note: 1931-1941: Including Ad-Dharmis)	32,428	75.51%	33,839	75.8%	30,299	75.09%	29,047	73.87%	33,228	73.31%	28,661	77.91%	29,466	76.38%
Islam	6,935	16.15%	7,152	16.02%	6,675	16.54%	5,820	14.8%	6,953	15.34%	5,810	15.79%	7,022	18.2%
Christianity	3,353	7.81%	3,078	6.89%	2,798	6.93%	3,666	9.32%	3,823	8.43%	1,540	4.19%	934	2.42%
Sikhism	202	0.47%	517	1.16%	544	1.35%	693	1.76%	1,173	2.59%	760	2.07%	1,032	2.68%
Jainism	23	0.05%	42	0.09%	32	0.08%	49	0.12%	90	0.2%	1	0%	114	0.3%
Buddhism	4	0.01%	0	0%	0	0%	26	0.07%	20	0.04%	14	0.04%	5	0.01%
Zoroastrianism	0	0%	11	0.02%	3	0.01%	16	0.04%	36	0.08%	0	0%	3	0.01%
Judaism	—N/a	—N/a	0	0%	0	0%	3	0.01%	1	0%	0	0%	0	0%
Others	0	0%	3	0.01%	0	0%	0	0%	3	0.01%	0	0%	0	0%
Total population	42,945	100%	44,642	100%	40,351	100%	39,320	100%	45,327	100%	36,786	100%	38,576	100%
Note: British Punjab province era district borders are not an exact match in the present-day due to various bifurcations to district borders — which since created new districts — throughout the historic Punjab Province region during the post-independence era that have taken into account population increases.

Religion in the Tehsils of Shimla District (1921)
Tehsil	Hinduism		Islam		Sikhism		Christianity		Jainism		Others (Note: Including Buddhism, Zoroastrianism, Judaism, Tribals, others, or not stated)		Total	
Tehsil	Pop.	%	Pop.	%	Pop.	%	Pop.	%	Pop.	%	Pop.	%	Pop.	%
Shimla Tehsil	23,237	66.39%	6,727	19.22%	1,171	3.35%	3,726	10.64%	85	0.24%	57	0.16%	35,003	100%
Kot Khai Tehsil	9,991	96.77%	226	2.19%	2	0.02%	100	0.97%	5	0.05%	0	0%	10,324	100%
Note: British Punjab province era tehsil borders are not an exact match in the present-day due to various bifurcations to tehsil borders — which since created new tehsils — throughout the historic Punjab Province region during the post-independence era that have taken into account population increases.

Religion in the Tehsils of Shimla District (1941)
Tehsil	Hinduism		Islam		Sikhism		Christianity		Jainism		Others (Note: Including Anglo-Indian Christians, British Christians, Buddhism, Zoroastrianism, Judaism, Tribals, others, or not stated)		Total	
Tehsil	Pop.	%	Pop.	%	Pop.	%	Pop.	%	Pop.	%	Pop.	%	Pop.	%
Shimla Tehsil	17,950	67.01%	6,825	25.48%	1,024	3.82%	439	1.64%	114	0.43%	434	1.62%	26,786	100%
Kot Khai Tehsil	11,516	97.68%	197	1.67%	8	0.07%	69	0.59%	0	0%	0	0%	11,790	100%
Note1: British Punjab province era tehsil borders are not an exact match in the present-day due to various bifurcations to tehsil borders — which since created new tehsils — throughout the historic Punjab Province region during the post-independence era that have taken into account population increases. Note2: Tehsil religious breakdown figures for Christianity only includes local Christians, labeled as "Indian Christians" on census. Does not include Anglo-Indian Christians or British Christians, who were classified under "Other" category.

Religious groups in Simla Hill States (British Punjab province era)
Religious group	1901		1911		1921		1931		1941	
Religious group	Pop.	%	Pop.	%	Pop.	%	Pop.	%	Pop.	%
Hinduism	373,886	96.03%	386,953	95.7%	292,768	95.45%	317,390	95.93%	345,716	96.16%
Islam	11,535	2.96%	11,374	2.81%	9,551	3.11%	10,017	3.03%	10,812	3.01%
Buddhism	2,223	0.57%	2,709	0.67%	2,052	0.67%	1,308	0.4%	10	0%
Sikhism	1,318	0.34%	2,911	0.72%	2,040	0.67%	1,817	0.55%	2,693	0.75%
Jainism	274	0.07%	172	0.04%	142	0.05%	141	0.04%	126	0.04%
Christianity	113	0.03%	224	0.06%	164	0.05%	176	0.05%	161	0.04%
Zoroastrianism	0	0%	0	0%	0	0%	1	0%	2	0%
Judaism	0	0%	0	0%	0	0%	0	0%	0	0%
Others	0	0%	0	0%	1	0%	0	0%	0	0%
Total population	389,349	100%	404,343	100%	306,718	100%	330,850	100%	359,520	100%
Note1: British Punjab province era district borders are not an exact match in the present-day due to various bifurcations to district borders — which since created new districts — throughout the historic Punjab Province region during the post-independence era that have taken into account population increases. Note2: 1901-1911 census: Including Jubbal, Bashahr, Keonthal, Baghal, Bilaspur, Nalagarh, and other minor hill states. Note3: 1921-1931 census: Including Bashahr, Nalagarh, Keonthal, Baghal, Jubbal, and other minor hill states. Note3: 1941 census: Including Bashahr, Nalagarh, Keonthal, Baghal, Jubbal, Baghat, Kumarsain, Bhajji, Mahlog, Balsan, Dhami, Kuthar, Kunihar, Mangal, Bija, Darkoti, Tharoch, and Sangri states.

=== Language ===
Languages of Shimla district (2011)
1. Pahari (67.6%)
2. Hindi (20.3%)
3. Nepali (4.63%)
4. Punjabi (1.39%)
5. Kangri (1.05%)
6. Others (5.01%)

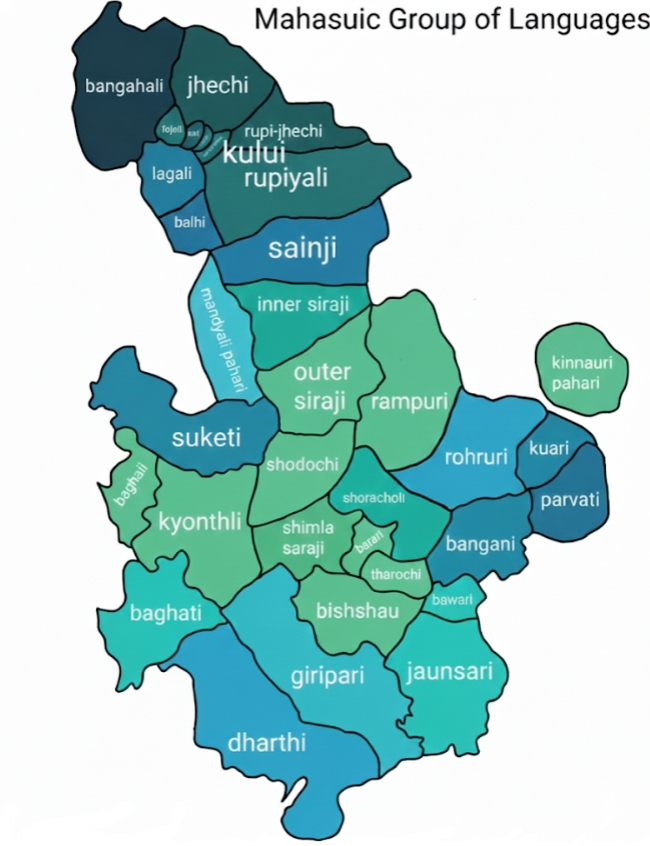
G.A. Grierson's linguistic map of Mahasu region which includes Shimla district

At the time of the 2011 census of India, 67.61% of the population recorded their language as Pahari, 20.31% Hindi, 4.63% Nepali, 1.39% Punjabi and 1.05% Kangri as their first language.

== Notable people ==
- Aalisha Panwar - Indian actress
- Abhilasha Kumari - Former Indian Judge
- Anupam Kher - Indian actor
- Asmita Sood - Indian television actress
- Anand Sharma - Former Union Minister and Member of Parliament, Rajya Sabha
- Ashish R Mohan - Indian film director
- Balak Ram Kashyap - Former Member of Parliament and Member of Legislative Assembly
- Chetan Singh - Historian
- Dhan Singh Thapa - a prestigious Indian Army Officer and Param Vir Chakra Awardee
- Harish Janartha - Member of Legislative Assembly
- Kamayani Bisht - educator, poet, actress
- Krushna Abhishek - Indian actor and comedian
- Nirmal Verma - Hindi writer
- Pratibha Singh - Member of Legislative Assembly
- Pratibha Ranta - Indian actress
- Priety Zinta - Indian actress
- Rakesh Singha - Politician
- Renuka Singh - Indian cricketer
- Rubina Dilaik - Indian actress
- Sanjay Chauhan - Politician
- Shakti Singh - Indian actor
- Shreya Sharma - Indian actress
- Shrinivas Joshi - columnist, theatre person, ex-civil servant
- Siddharth Pandey - writer, historian, photographer
- Suresh Bhardwaj - Former Member of Legislative Assembly
- Sushma Verma - Indian cricketer
- Thakur Ram Lal - Former Chief Minister of Himachal Pradesh
- Vikramaditya Singh - Member of Lagislative Assembly
- Vikrant Massey - Indian actor
- Virbhadra Singh - Former Chief Minister of Himachal Pradesh
