= Bhimakali Temple =

Temple Of Goddess Bhimakali

- भीमाकाली मंदिर
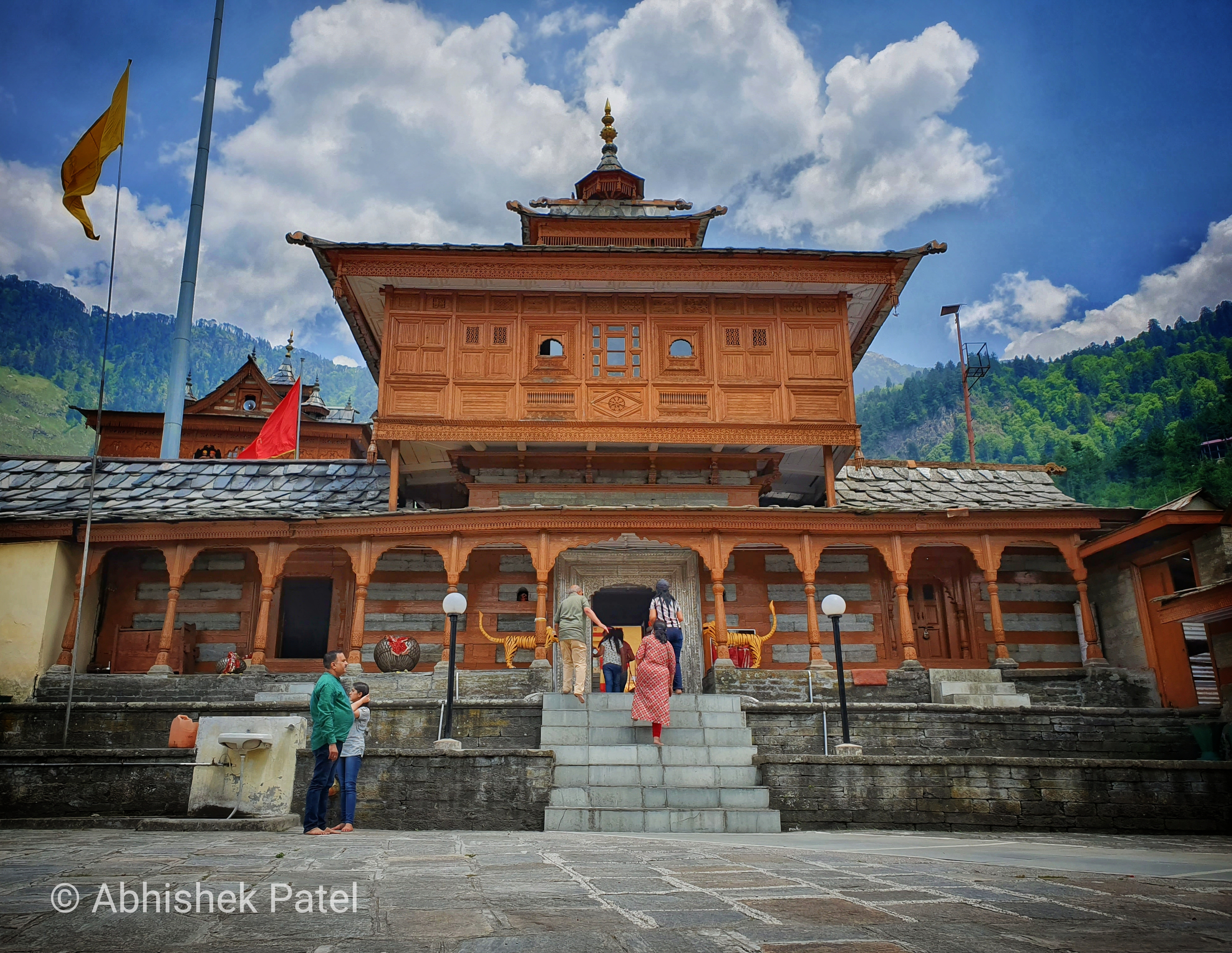

- Location in Himachal Pradesh

Religion
- Affiliation: Hinduism
- Deity: Devi
- Festivals: Navratri, Dussehra

Location
- State: Himachal Pradesh
- Country: India
- Coordinates: 31°26′57.95″N 77°37′51.13″E

Architecture
- Type: Kath kuni architecture

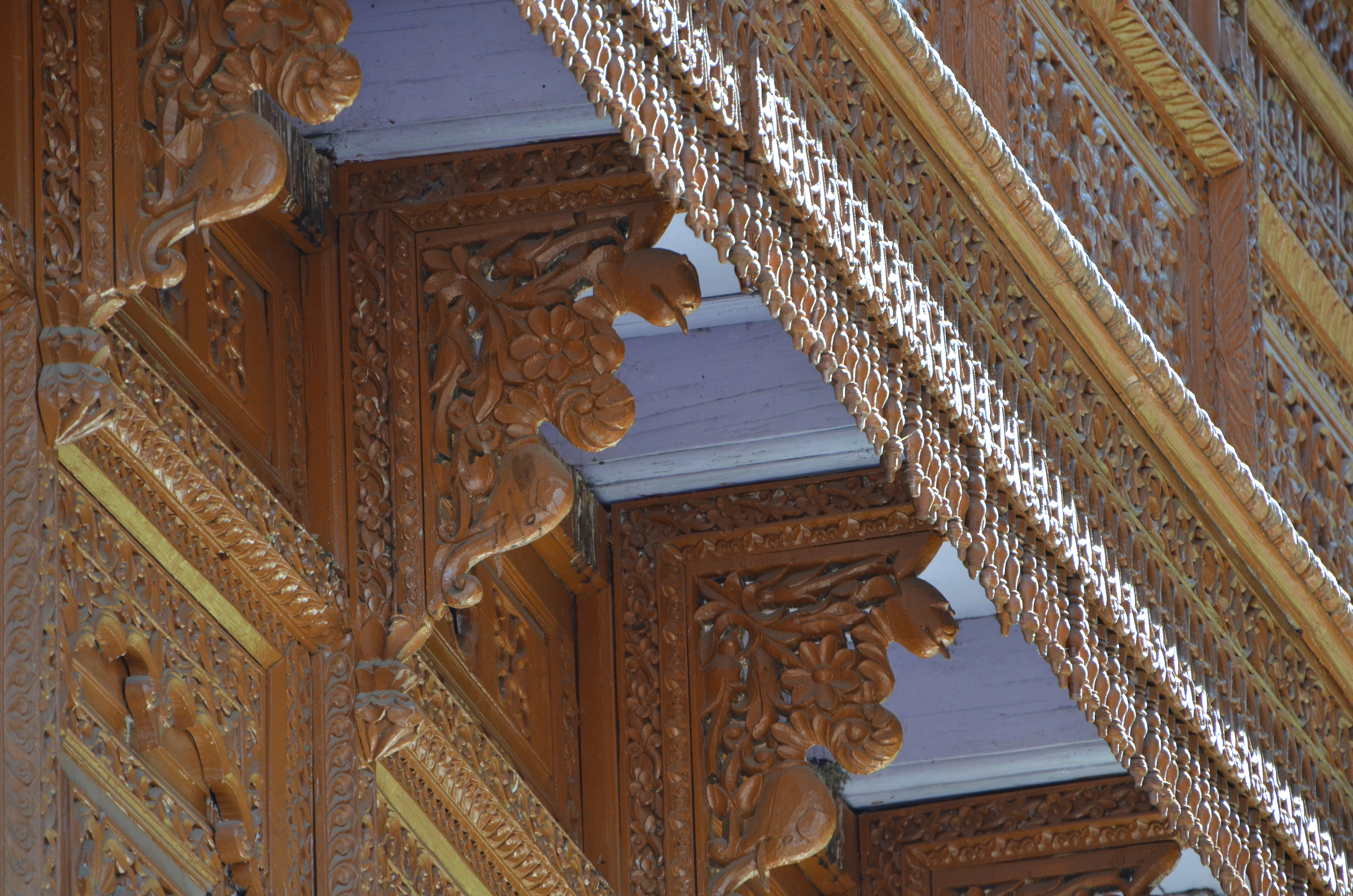
Intricate wood work on exterior of Bhimakali Temple

Bhimakali Temple is a Hindu temple at Sarahan in Himachal Pradesh, India dedicated to the Hindu goddess Bhimakali, the presiding deity of the rulers of the former Bushahr state. The temple is about 180 kms from Shimla and it is considered as holy as 51 Shakta pithas.

== History ==
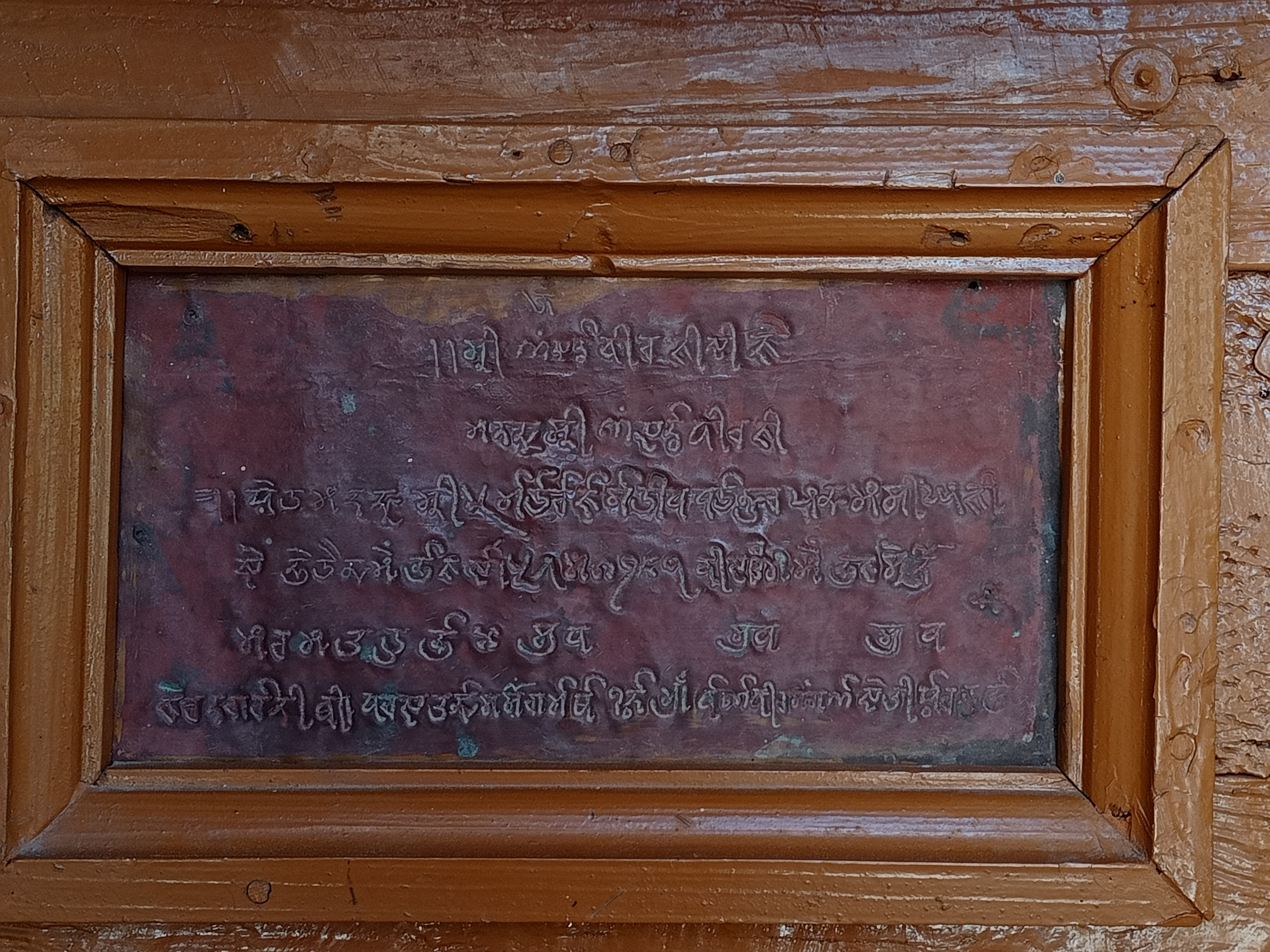
Tankri inscription issued by Raja Padam Singh of Bushahr, at Bheema kali temple complex, Sarahan, Rampur Bushahr, Himachal Pradesh

The temple was built in 13th century as a shrine dedicated to Durga. She is the kuldevi of the rulers of the erstwhile Bushehr state. The temple is a popular pilgrimage site in Himachal Pradesh. Raja Padam Singh contributed towards rebuilding the temple in the 1920s.

During the 1905 Kangra earthquake disaster, the main tower tilted slightly but astonishingly straightened back during a subsequent tremor. Legend has it that the temple has deep foundations and includes a disused tunnel connecting it to the village of Ranwin, located a kilometer away. In ancient times, priests supposedly used this secret passage for entering and leaving the temple.

== Architecture ==
The architectural style of the temple is a blend of Hindu and Buddhist temple construction styles that is not found anywhere else in the hilly region. Constructed in tower temple typology and kath-kuni style, the temple has three courtyards that surround the main complex. There is a twin tower, a guest house, the old royal palace of Bushahr, accommodation space for support staff, and a couple of smaller temples. The first courtyard has Narsingha temple, the second courtyard has Raghunath temple, and the third courtyard has the twin towers containing the idol of Bhimakali.

There are four exquisitely carved gateways to the temple: the first gate is gold-plated, the second gate is silver foiled, the third gate opens to the Raghunath temple, and the fourth gate opens to the twin tower temples and it is known as Shri Dwar. The entire complex has wooden and silver carvings. The external open areas are decorated with wooden chimes that still produce humming sounds while oscillating. Stones and deodar wood were the primary materials of construction.

== Conservation ==
In 2022, a portion of the foundation of the temple collapsed. An analysis committee was established in 2023 with the help of the Bhimakali Temple Trust Rampur to assess the damages and prepare a plan to protect and conserve the temple. Experts from IIT - Mandi were hired to assess the cause of natural damages and propose conservation methods.

== Gallery ==
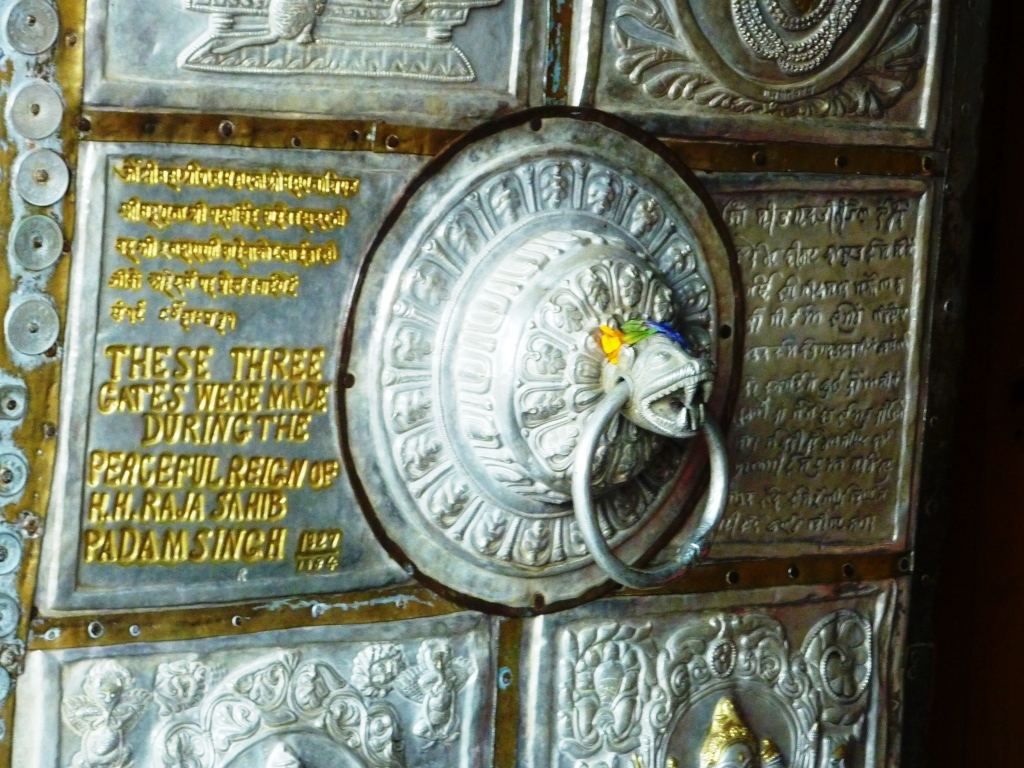
Inscription on door to Bhimakali Temple - These gates were made in the reign of Raja Padam Singh 1927.

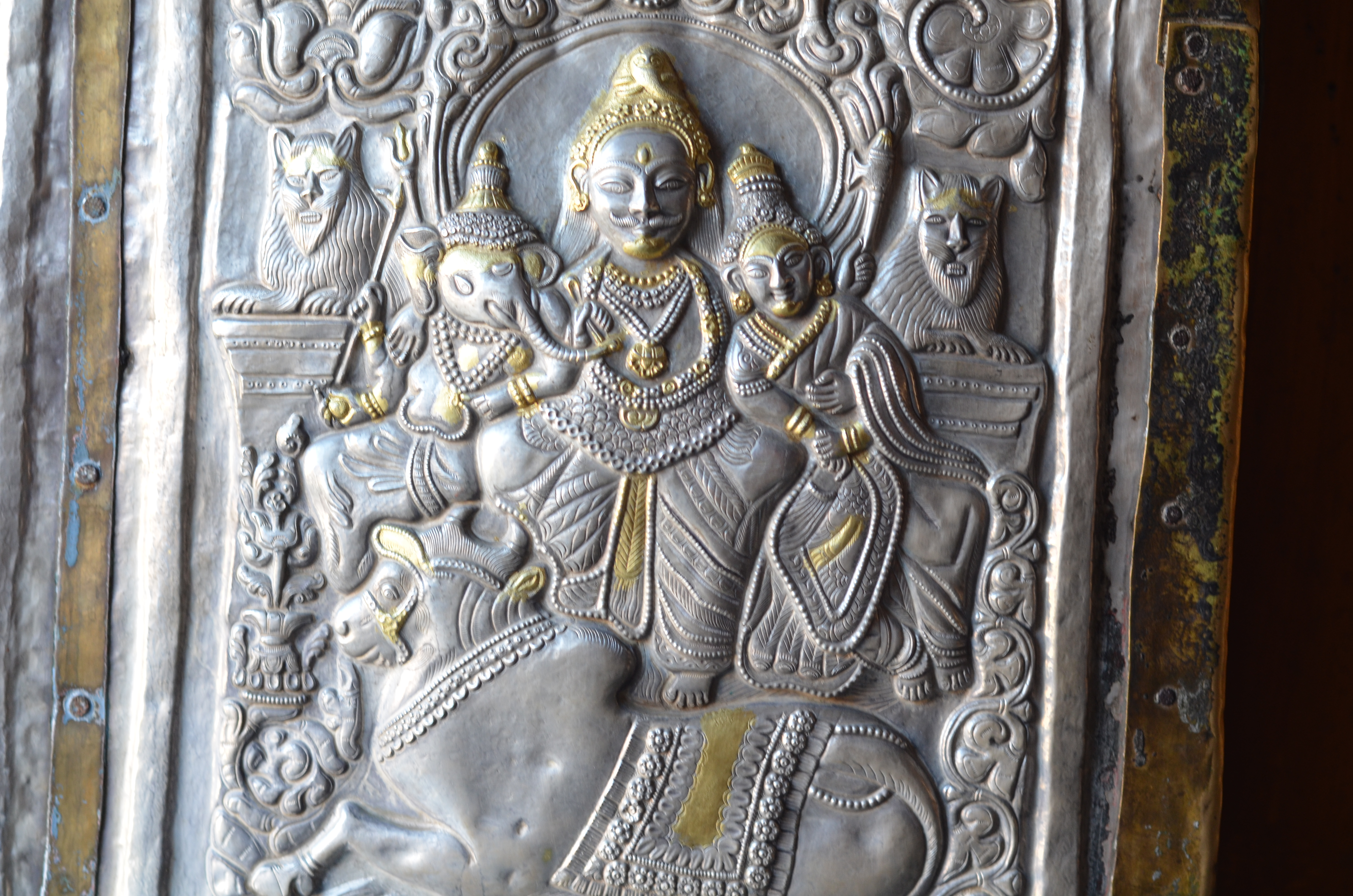
On one of the doors of the temple

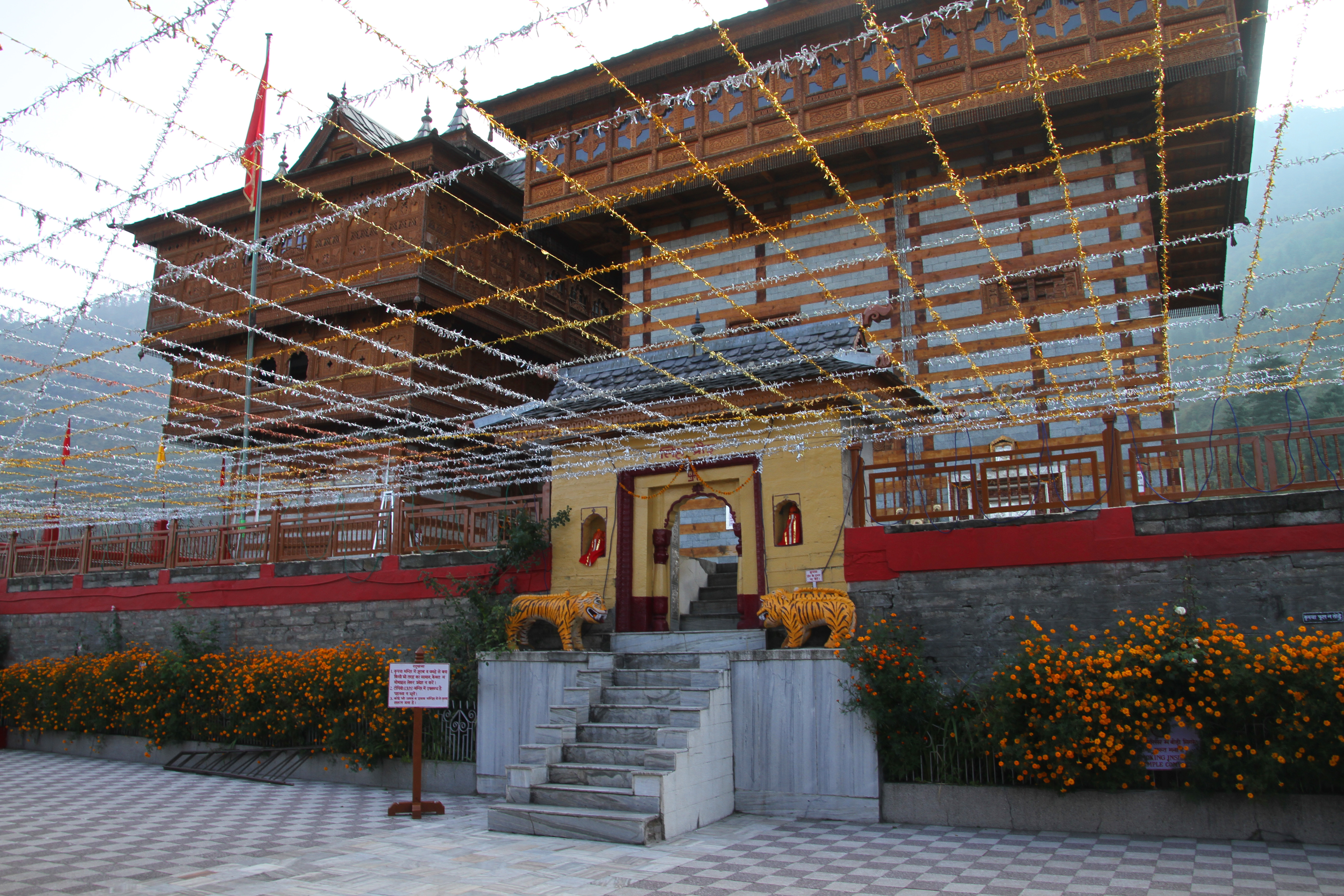
Inner courtyard of Bhimakali Temple

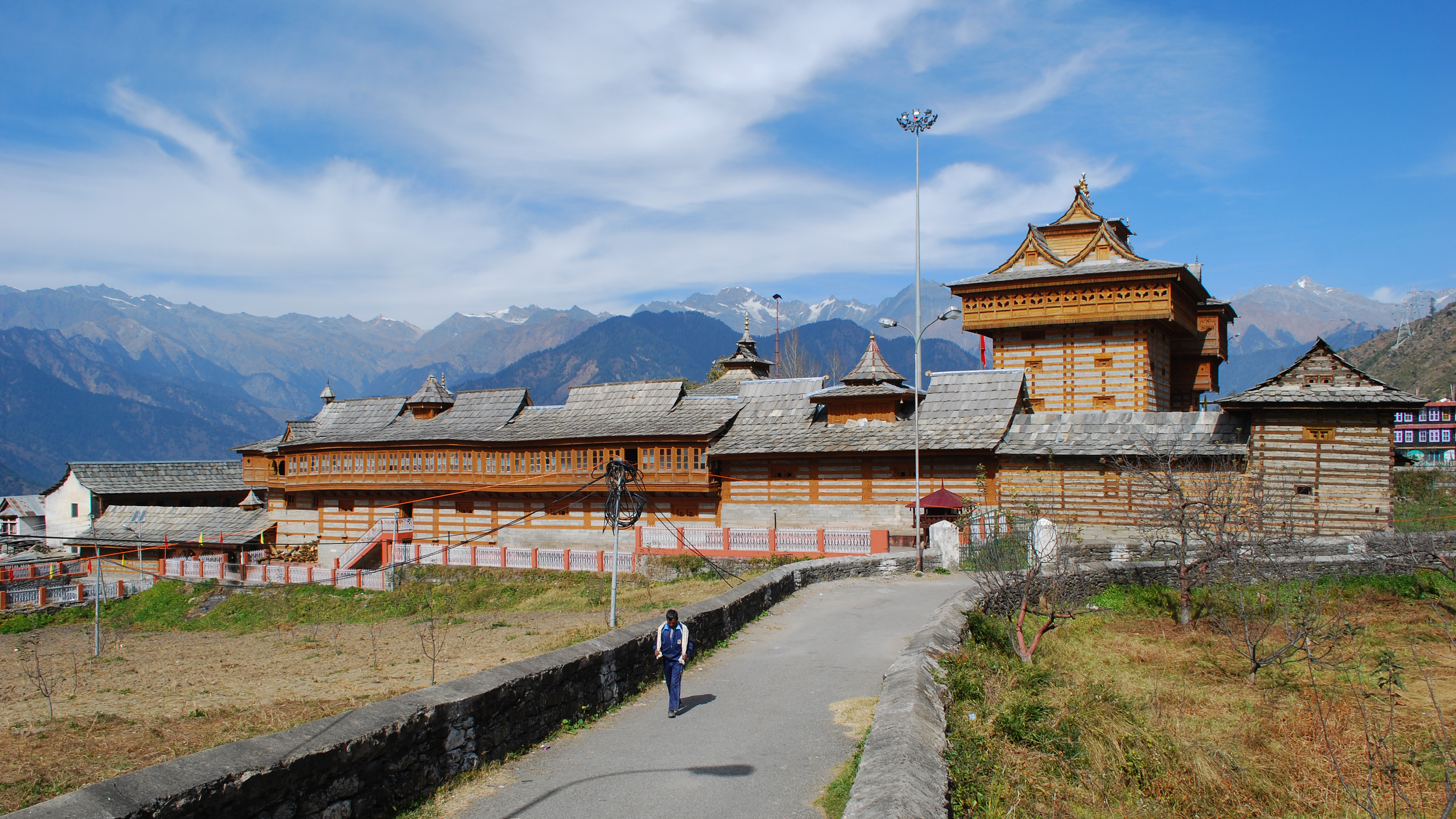
View of the Bhimakali temple

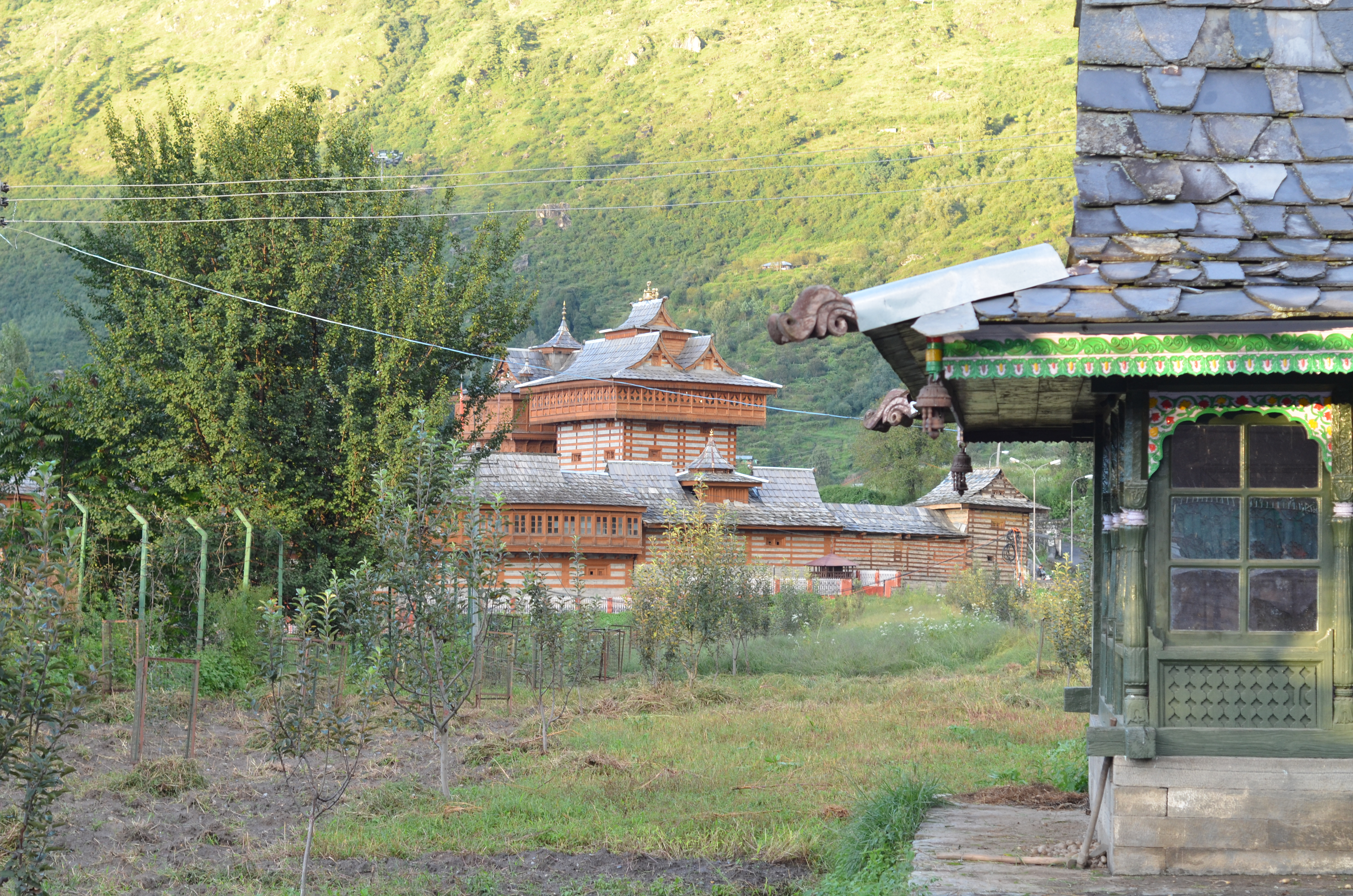
Bhimakali Temple in the background

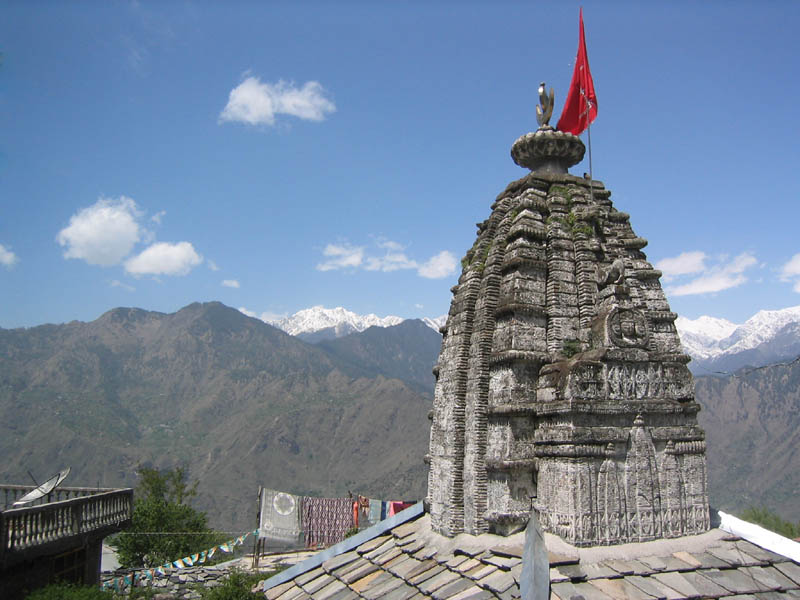
A temple alongside the Bhimakali temple

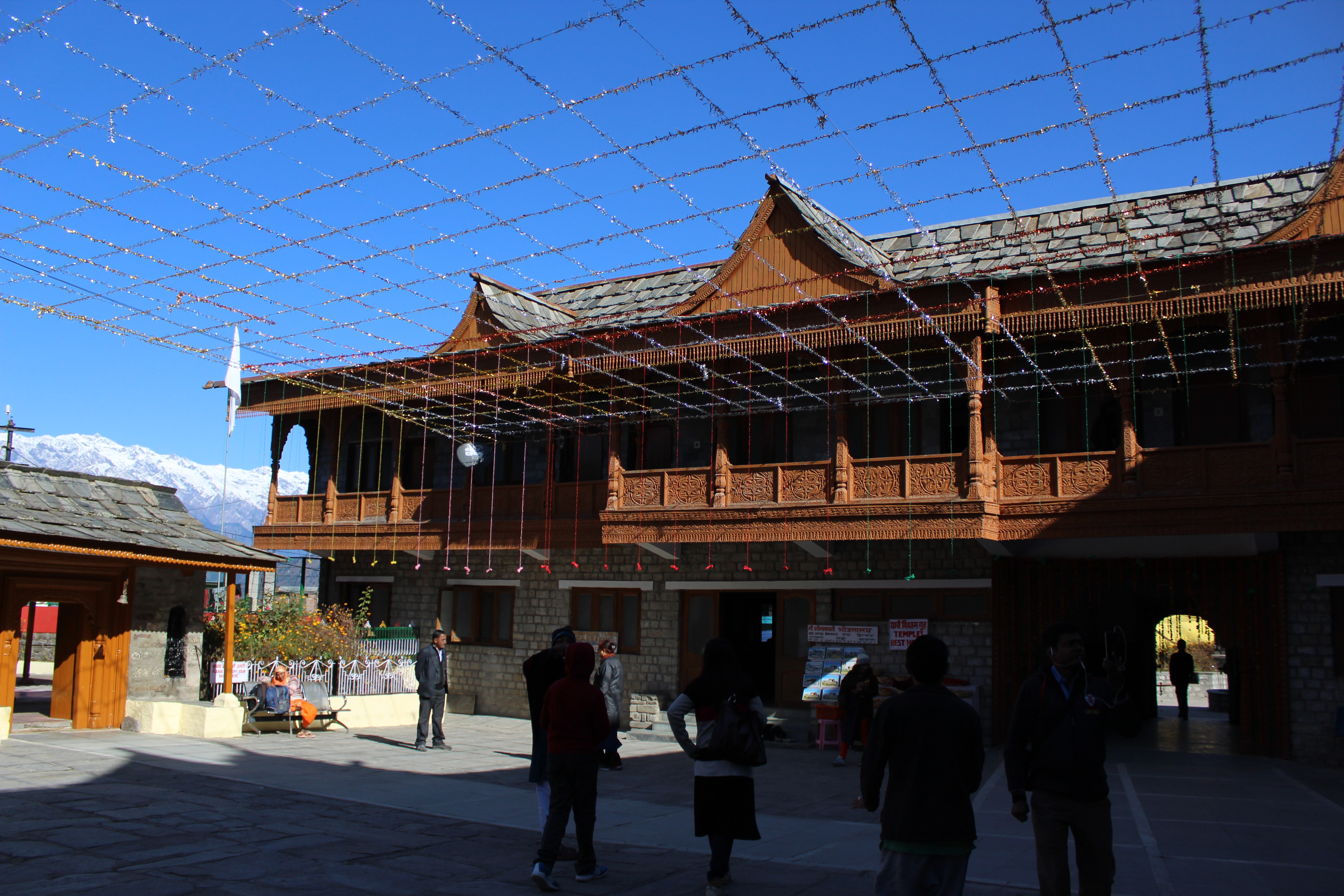
Bhimakali Temple at Sarahan
