= Sarahan =

Town in Himachal Pradesh, India

- Town
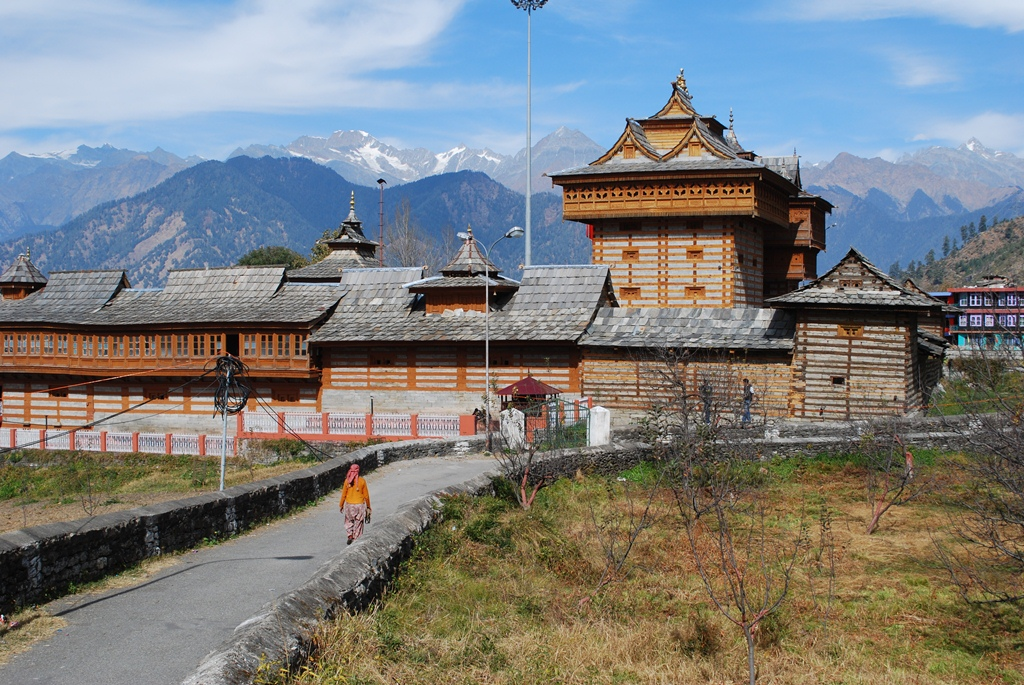
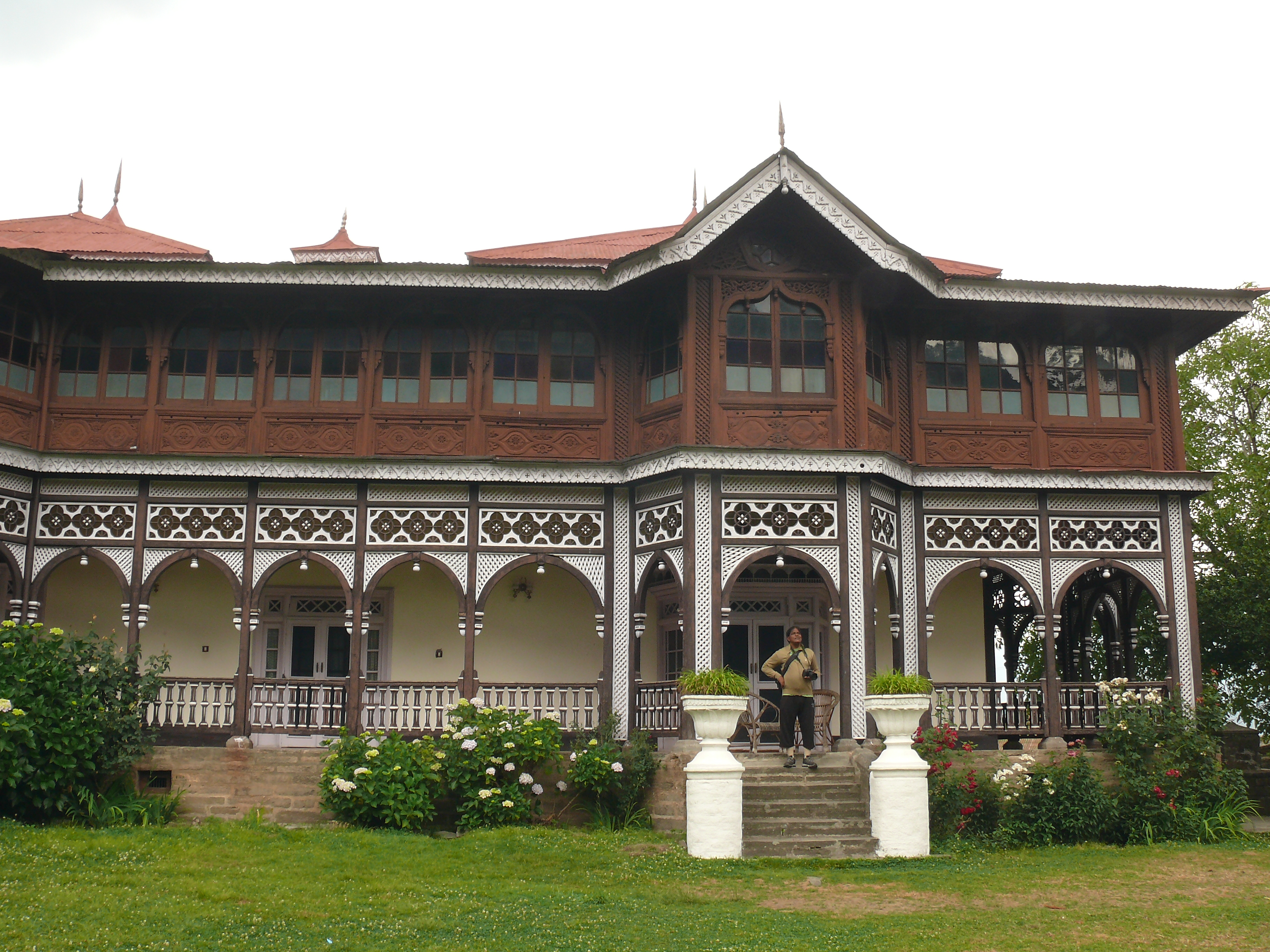
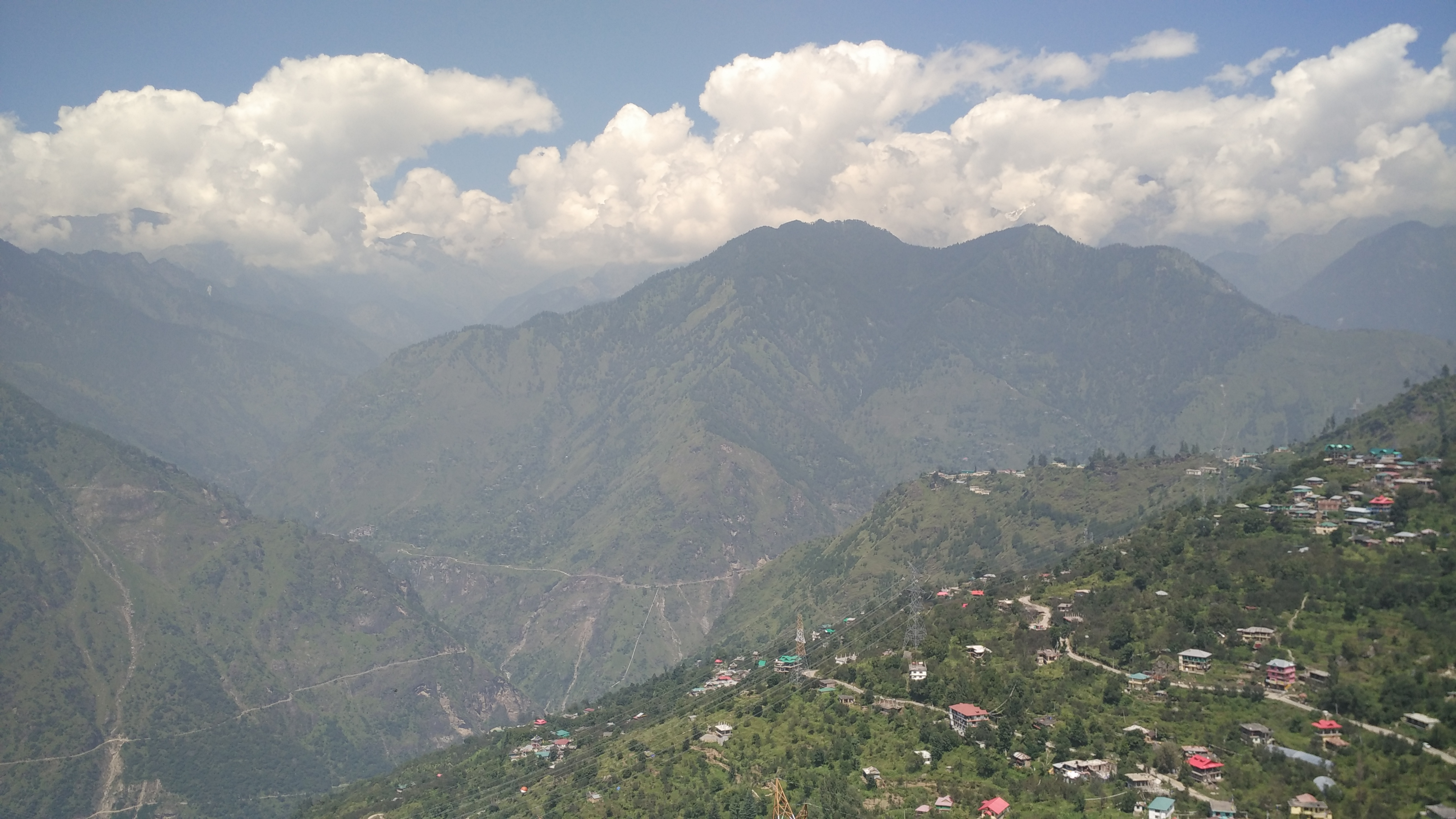
- Bhimakali temple The King's Palace Sarahan viewed frm above

- Location in Himachal Pradesh, India Sarahan (India)
- Coordinates: 31°31′12″N 77°48′0″E
- Country: India
- State: Himachal Pradesh
- District: Shimla

Languages
  - Official: Hindi
- Time zone: UTC+5:30 (IST)
- Website: himachalpr.gov.in

Sarahan is a small town in Himachal Pradesh, India. It is the site of the Bhimakali Temple, originally known as Bhimadevi Temple (Bhīmā Kālī), dedicated to the mother goddess Bhimakali, presiding deity of the rulers of the former Bushahr State. The temple is situated about 170 kilometres from Shimla and is one of the 51 Shakta pithas. Seven kilometers below (17 km by road) Sarahan is the river Satluj. Sarahan Bushahr was the summer capital of Bushahr kingdom, with Rampur Bushahr considered the winter capital.

== Landmarks ==
=== Temples ===
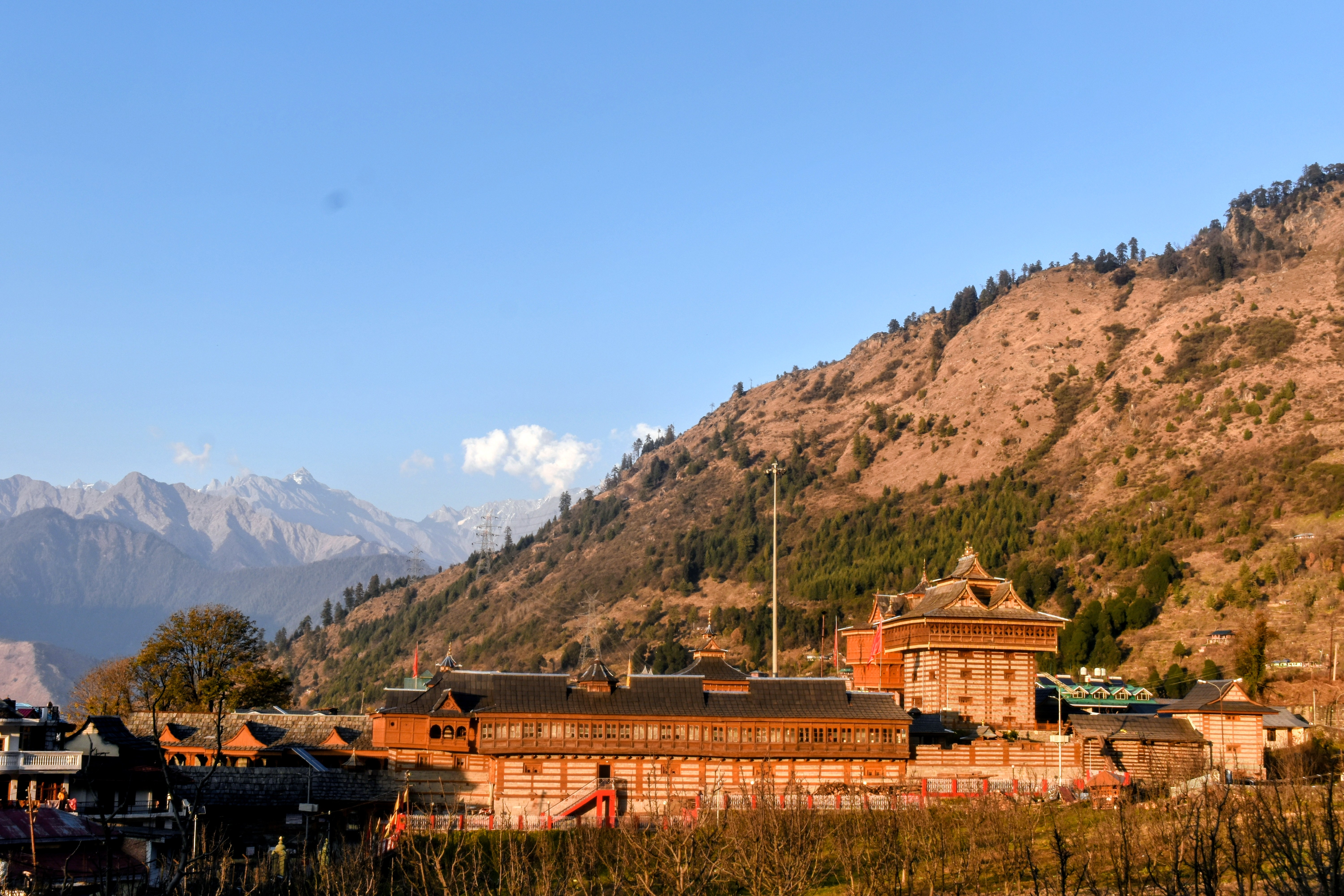
Bhimakali Temple Complex, Sarahan, Himachal Pradesh.jpg

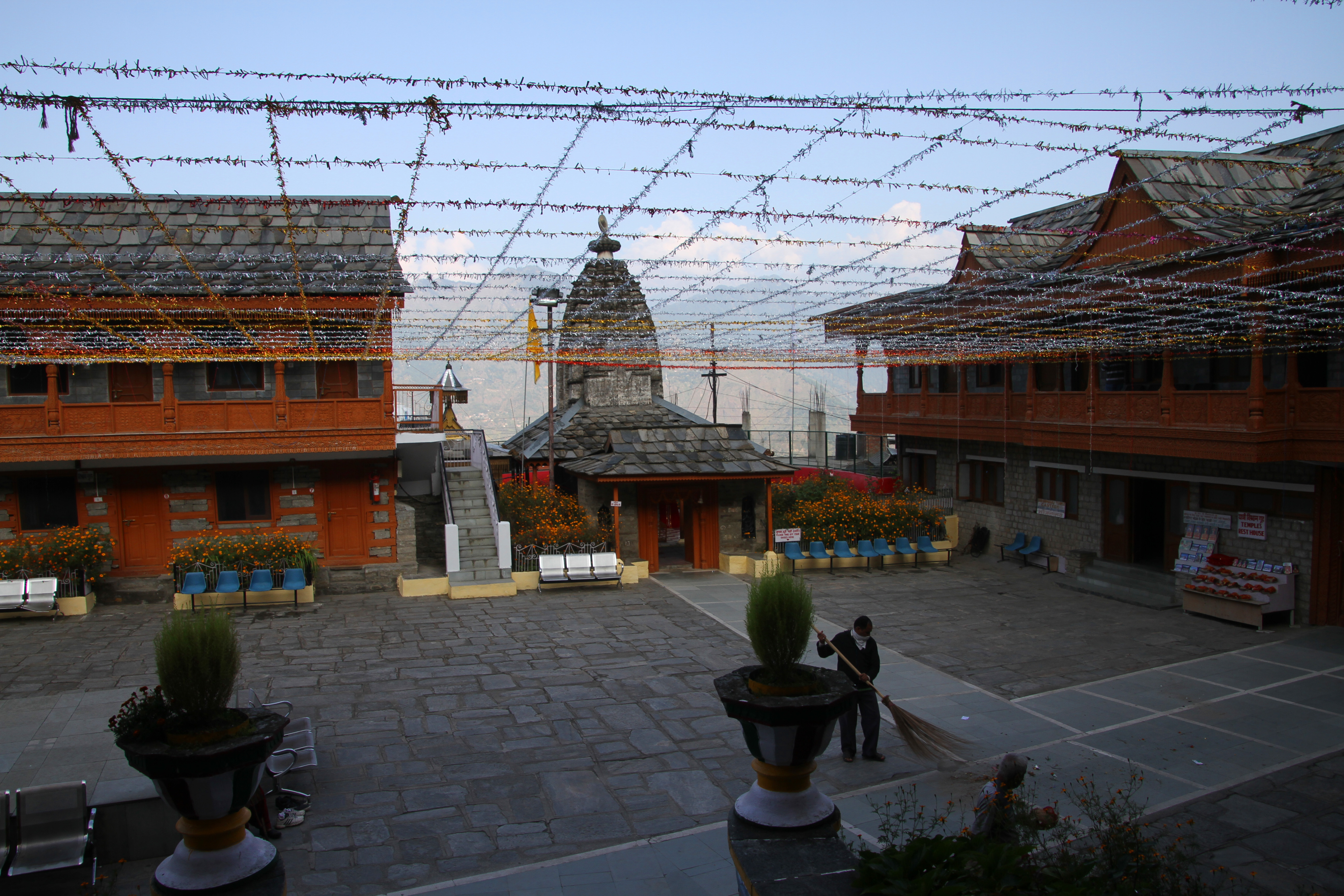
Inside Sarahan Bhimakali temple

The Bhimakali Temple houses the "Kuldevi" (the presiding deity of the dynasty) of Bushahr Kingdom. The Bhimakali Temple contains both Hindu and Vajrayāna Buddhist statues and decorations which reflect the trade through here between India and Tibetan regions through ancient Indo-Tibetan Road. The traces of old Indo-Tibetan road still passes through Shalabag near Sarahan. Traditional wooden temple architecture is built in Kath-Kuni style. Some stone images may date to Kushan era (c. 1st to 3rd centuries CE).

There are two adjacent temple buildings. One is old and resurrected, and the other is relatively new. The temple is built in an Kath-Kuni style of architecture. Alternate rows of grooved and interlocked stones and wood provide strength to the walls. Thick walls with lower roofs found in typical mountainous region buildings provide warmth during winters. Bushahr kings are believed to be dynastic priests of the temple, and used to reside in temple premises before moving to palace 100 meters from the temple.

=== Palace ===
The King's and Queen's Palace are comparatively recent buildings adjacent to the temple. The royal family does not live there and visits occasionally during Durga Puja Festival in October.

== Geography and climate ==
Sarahan is located at 31.52°N 77.80°E. It has an average elevation of 2,313 metres (7,589 feet).

From November to March, the region receives moderate to heavy snowfall with intermittent rainfall. The temperature ranges from 7 ˚C to -11 ˚C. From April to July the summer season has temperatures between 10 ˚C to 28 ˚C. From August to October, the region receives moderate rainfall.

== Transport ==
Sarahan is 564 kilometres from New Delhi and 172 kilometres from Shimla. One can travel by train to Kalka or by air to Chandigarh and then travel by road to Sarahan and by train from Kalka to Shimla. Bus services are also available from Chandigarh, Shimla, Rampur and Jeori. It takes approximately 6 to 8 hours by road to reach Sarahan from Shimla and 9 to 11 hours from Chandigarh.

== Notable people ==
- Virbhadra Singh - politician

== Gallery ==
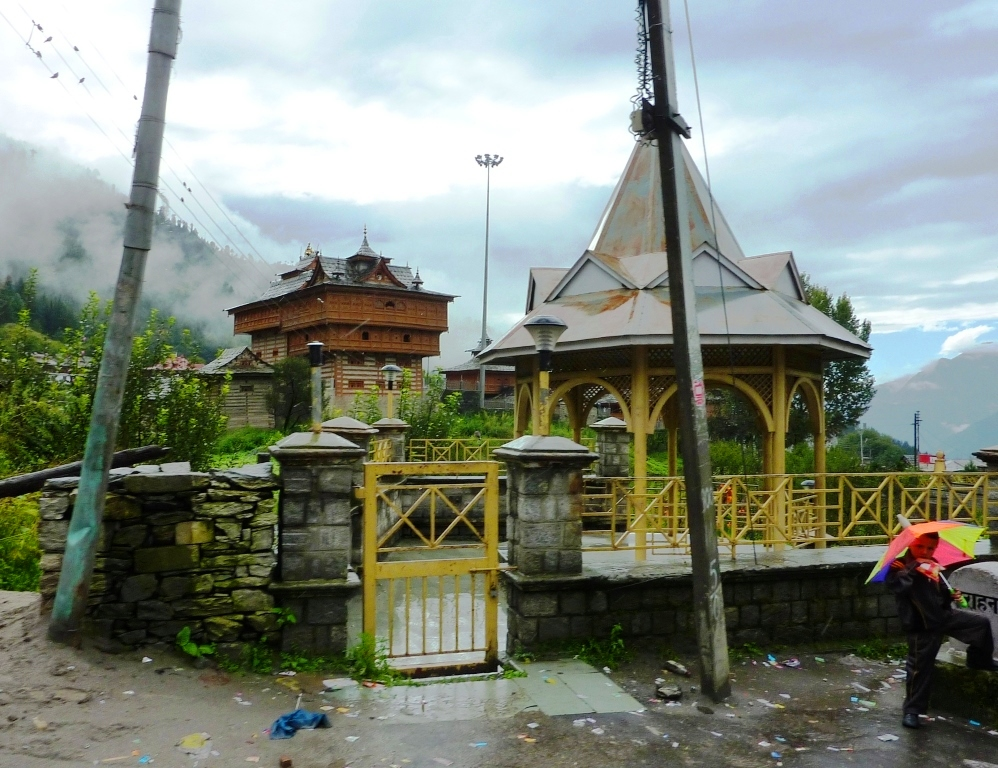
Bandstand at the Royal Palace

== See also ==
- Bhimakali temple
