= Kath kuni architecture =

Indigenous knowledge for sustainable architecture

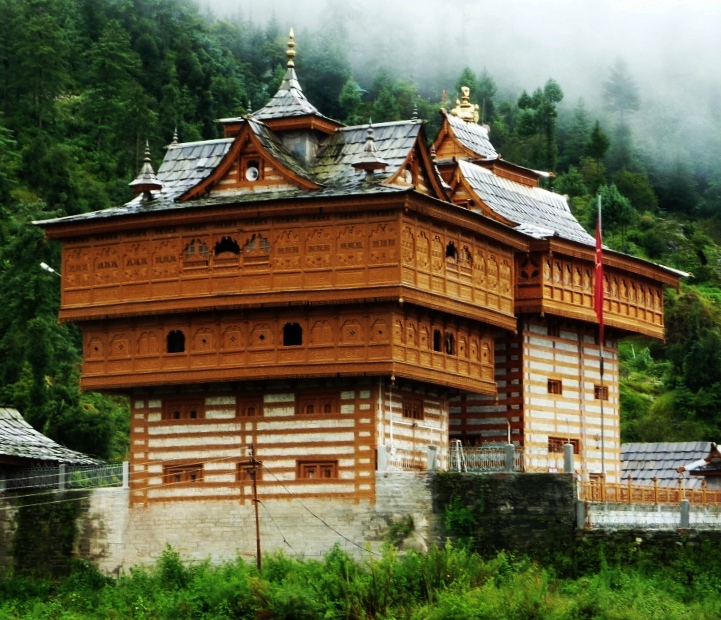
Bhimakali temple, built in Kath-Kuni style of architecture.

Traditional kath kuni wooden house having stone roof in koti, Rohru, Shimla.jpg

Kath-Kuni is an indigenous construction technique prevalent in the isolated hills of northern India, especially in the region of Himachal Pradesh. Kath-kuni is derived from the Sanskrit words kāshth and kona, meaning wood and corner, respectively. It also goes by other names such as kath-kona, kath-ki-kanni in Sarahan region.

It is a traditional technique that uses alternating layers of wood and stone masonry, held in place without using mortar. It has been transmitted orally and empirically from one generation to the next, through apprenticeships spanning a number of years.

The relative isolation of the hills and demanding weather have fostered development and persistence of this distinctive vernacular cator and cribbage architecture style. This is most evident in the temples in the region.

== Settlement pattern ==
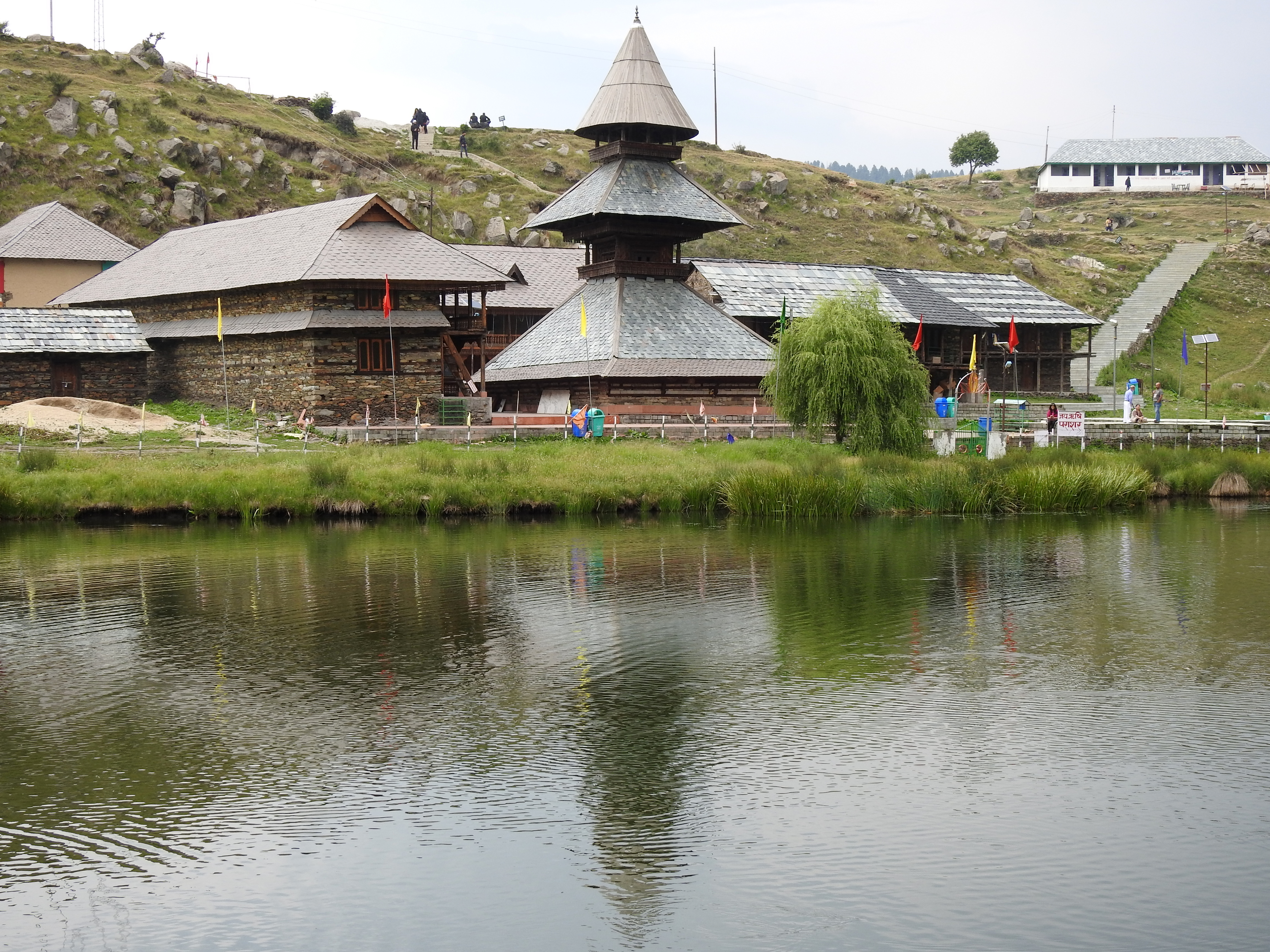
Prashar Temple, built in Kath-Kuni style of architecture.

The settlements appear to be draped along the contours of the landscape, typically along the sunny slopes of the hills and mountains. The houses, markets and streets in a village are arranged around a primary focal point, usually a temple with adjoining open spaces. These spaces act as a shared space for community celebrations. The temple is located at the highest place or largest plateau of flat ground to be visible from a distance. As their height suggests, tower temples historically also functioned as watchtowers and are often strategically located, to be used as surveillance points.

== Building indoor layout ==
Typical houses in Himachal Pradesh are two to three storeys high while temples may rise higher up to seven storeys. The basic method of construction is constant, the level or ornamentation and detailing varies. Each storey is used for a specific function. Ground level is for the cattle (gaushala), first for storage and last ones are living spaces. A staircase connects all the floors. Sometimes a secondary mezzanine level in the gaushala (ground floor) serves to get the fodder off the ground and closer to the next floor.

== Materials and construction ==
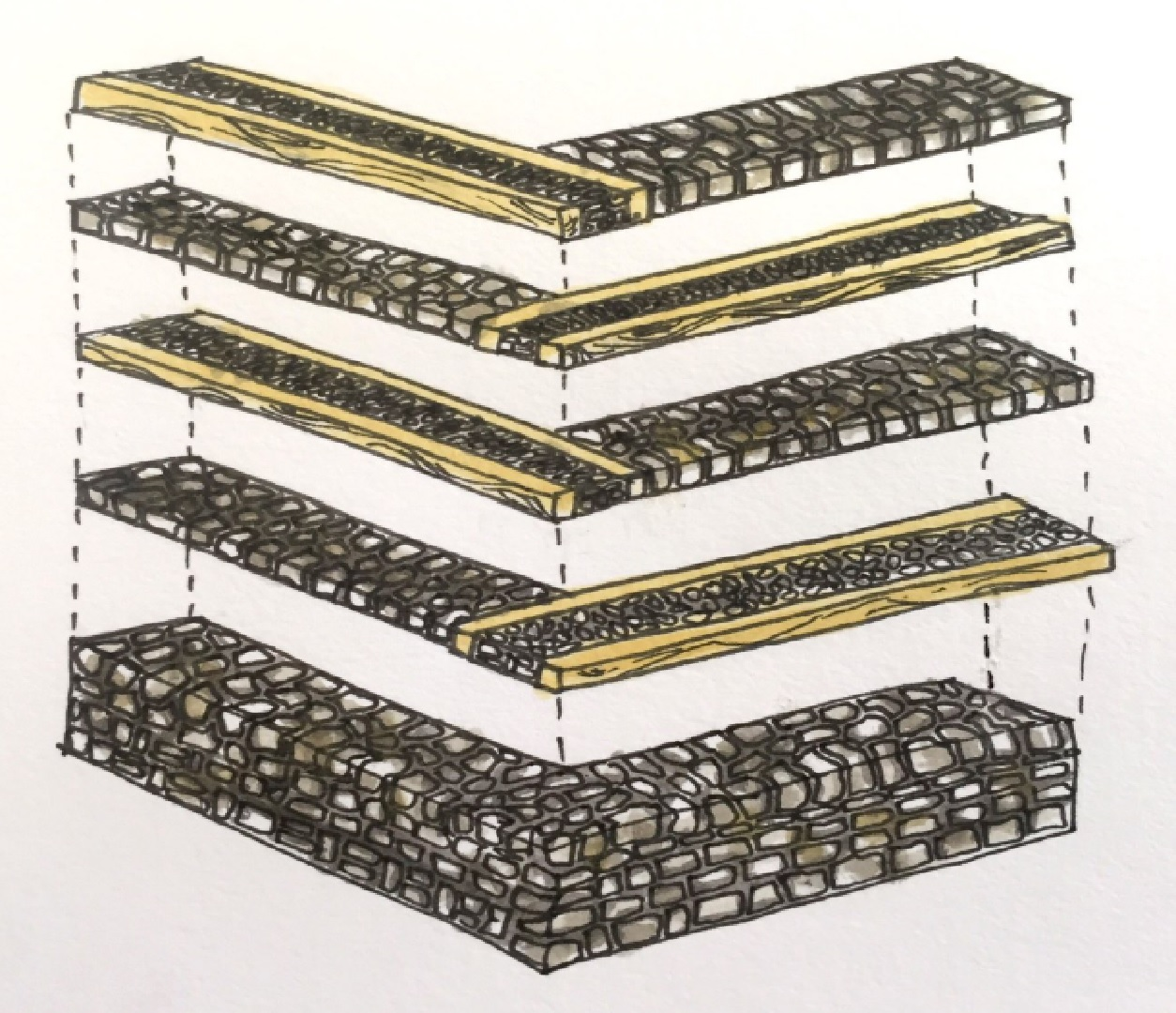
Layering of wood and stone elements.

The construction was largely done by hand and by residents themselves. Special artesians were employed for building temples or religious structures. The walls are made of stone and wood which are alternatively stacked up, with wooden members interlocking at corners. Himachal Pradesh is rich in timber that is strong and long lasting. Deodar/Kali wood which is an endemic species to the western Himalayas and one of the strongest of Indian conifers, is used in the wall, flooring and roofing members. A well known folk saying is that this Himalayan wood will last 1,000 years in water and ten times longer in air. Slate, is used as a waterproof roofing material, employed to protect the building from heavy rain and snowfall.

The ground trench is dug and filled with loose stone blocks which rise up to make the plinth. The construction of walls involves laying two wooden beams longitudinally parallel to each other with a gap in between. Loose in-fill material is packed as a filler and the external and internal skins of the wall are held together by cross braces or dovetail (maanvi). As the wall rises, the stone courses decrease and the wood sections gradually increase. The heavier stone base carries the lighter wooden structure at upper levels. The internal walls are plastered with mud. Truncated stone corner protects the wooden beams and a wooden peg (kadil) helps in keeping solid wood beams in place. The wooden framed roof rests on the wooden beams followed by purlin and rafters. It is an overhanging roof covered in locally sourced slate or wooden shingles.

Apart from construction of the structure, wood joinery can be found in the door frames and other places. They follow regular geometric patterns and are a complex play of interlocking volumes and fluid edges. These wooden joints, likely without the use of nails, flex just enough to rock with seismic waves during an earthquake but otherwise are tightly locked together.

== Climate responsive architectural features ==
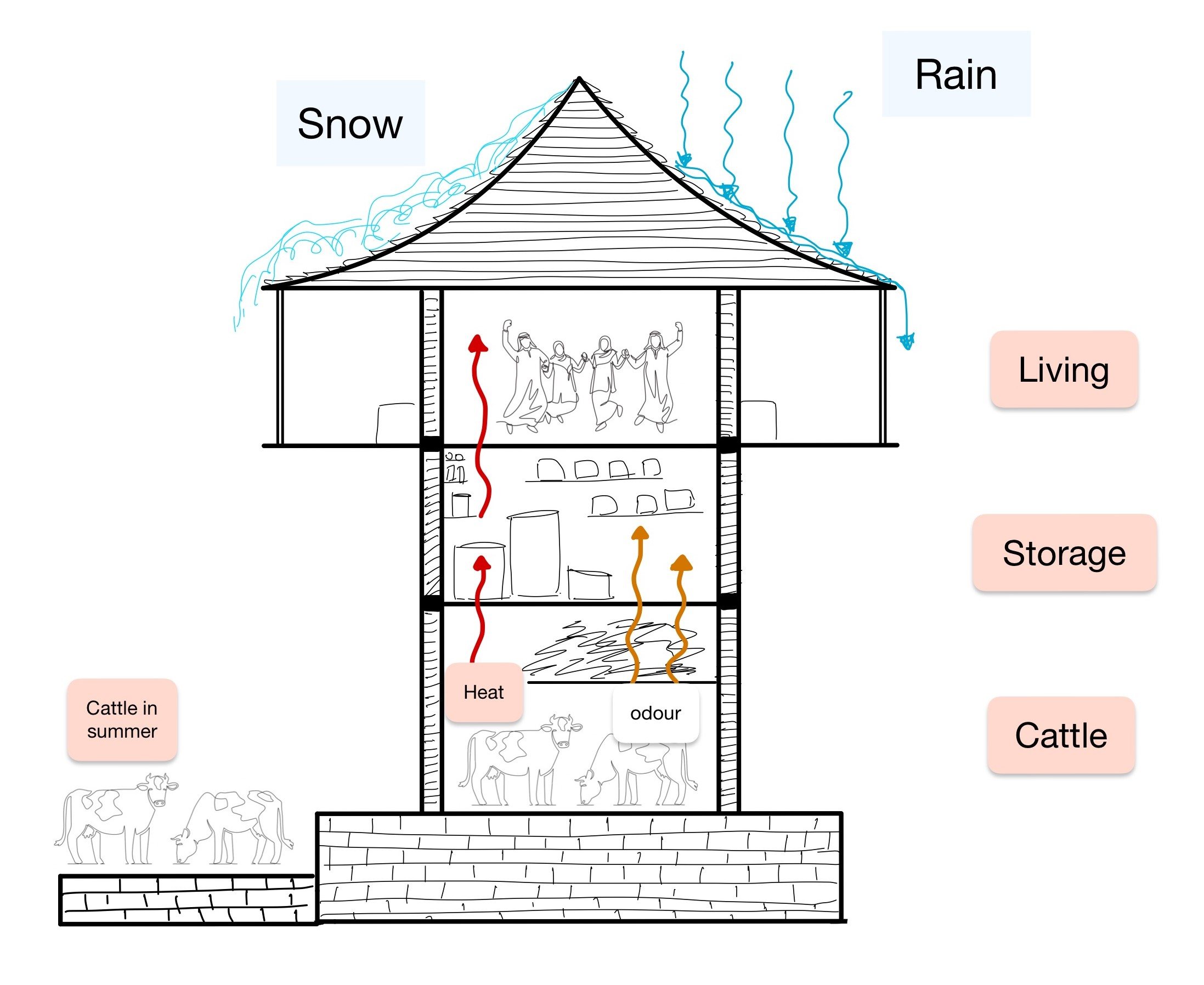
Typical house section

The indigenous buildings of Himachal Pradesh utilize local materials, construction techniques and joinery details to resist climatic and seismic forces. The interlocking of joints without nails is a hallmark of this construction method.

The building is oriented such that the longer facade faces South, to maximize low angle solar gain during winters. The houses are also oriented such that the longer side faces the valley and backs the mountains, which makes them less susceptible to seismic forces.

The stone plinth rises above ground level provides strength to the superstructure, protects from groundwater and dampens the seismic forces.

The double skinned cavity wall with an air gap is filled with small pieces of stone that act as thermal insulation keeping the indoors warm in winters and cool in summers. The air gap in the wall also dissipates the seismic force during an earthquake.

The roof is pent, gable or a combination of both, the steeper slope of the roof disperses off snow, whereas the flatter part holds some which acts as insulation. The slate stone used on the roof is frost resistant and naturally weighs down the structure providing stability.

Fenestration, windows and doors are smaller and balconies, if present are enclosed to conserve heat during the winters.

The construction from foundation to roof uses no mortar for binding. The weight of the structure alone holds it in place. The nail-less framework without rivets and a non-rigid construction allows the building to flex with the seismic waves and effectively dissipates the forces.

In summers cattle are kept outside in a shaded area and during winters they are moved to the ground floor. In the winters, the heat generated by the cattle moves up to the topmost living spaces and provides extra warmth. The secondary mezzanine level in the ground floor with the cattle fodder offers further insulation to the top floors.

An entire floor is dedicated for storage. Grains, vegetables, bedding, clothing and other household items are stored in advance specially for the winter when accessibility is low. The storage is strategically placed between the cattle and living to prevent the odors from the cattle from reaching the living spaces.

The living spaces are the topmost floors to benefit from all the heat in the house that rises up. It houses the living area, bedroom and kitchen. They are also cantilevered from the main walls of the house to capture sunlight, during the day.

== Extinction ==
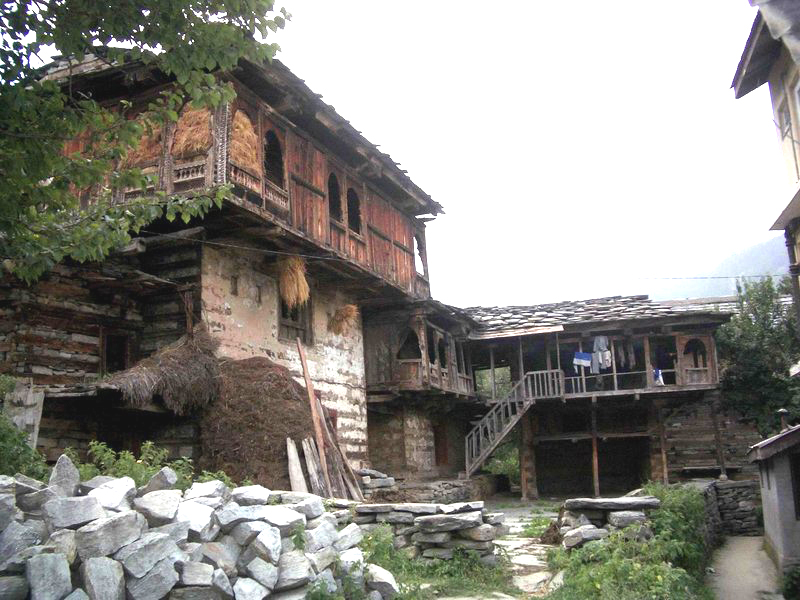
Kath Kuni house, Himachal Pradesh

Some houses and temples built using the kath-khuni technique are centuries old. The local masons knowledge of the terrain, available natural resources and climate played a vital role in the longevity of these traditional structures. While these structures stand the test of time, it is this knowledge that is going extinct. The scarcity of materials and craftsmanship make it challenging to build economically. Brick and concrete structures are slowly replacing the Kath-Khuni way. Not only are these new buildings less climate adaptive, they are expensive in terms of transportation of material and labor. Also, with rising demand for natural materials, the rapid loss of forest covers resulted in the enforcement of Environment & Forest Act that restricts the use of wood from these forests.

== Sustainability and relevance ==
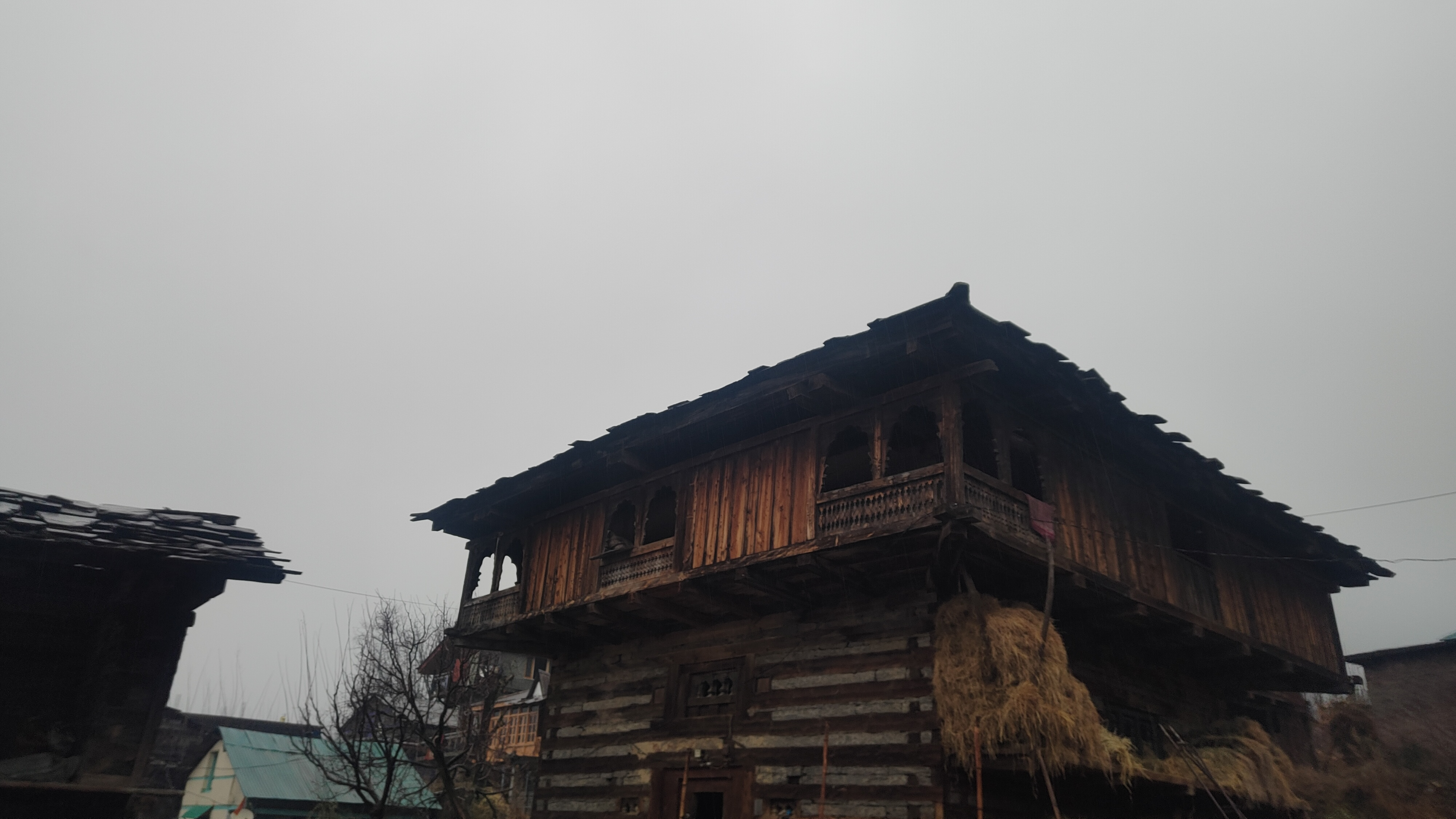
Kath Kuni House in Dashal, Kullu

Since the construction primarily uses locally available stone and wood, it uses resources at hand instead of materials that are processed and moved from somewhere else. Hence, it is time and resource-efficient. The building materials are naturally biodegradable and, in most cases, can be reused as well. The indoor layout designed according to function and prevailing climatic conditions stands the test of time and provides adequate thermal comfort for the occupants. These climate-responsive design features are inherently low maintenance and relevant to achieving energy efficiency even today. The Kath Kuni construction technique is believed to be a thousand years old, and the flexibility in construction allows the structure to flex with the seismic waves offering excellent structural and seismic resilience. Villages and towns were planned to aid communal bonding with ample public spaces for celebration and gathering. This evokes a sense of identity and belonging.

Hidimba Devi Temple

A sustainable development is the result of the design philosophy which focuses on increasing the efficiency of resources used like energy, water, and materials, while reducing the impact of buildings on human and the environment. It is necessary to maintain the ecological balance and reduce the impact of climatic change. While vernacular architecture is sustainable by definition and practice, it is difficult to achieve that level of sustainability in today's time with scarce natural resources, dying knowledge and modern lifestyle demands, especially considering mountainous terrains have lesser carrying capacity than flatter ones.

== See also ==
- Vernacular architecture
- Architecture of India
- Hindu temple architecture
- Arts and crafts of Himachal Pradesh
