= Shoghi, Shimla =

Shoghi
- Suburb
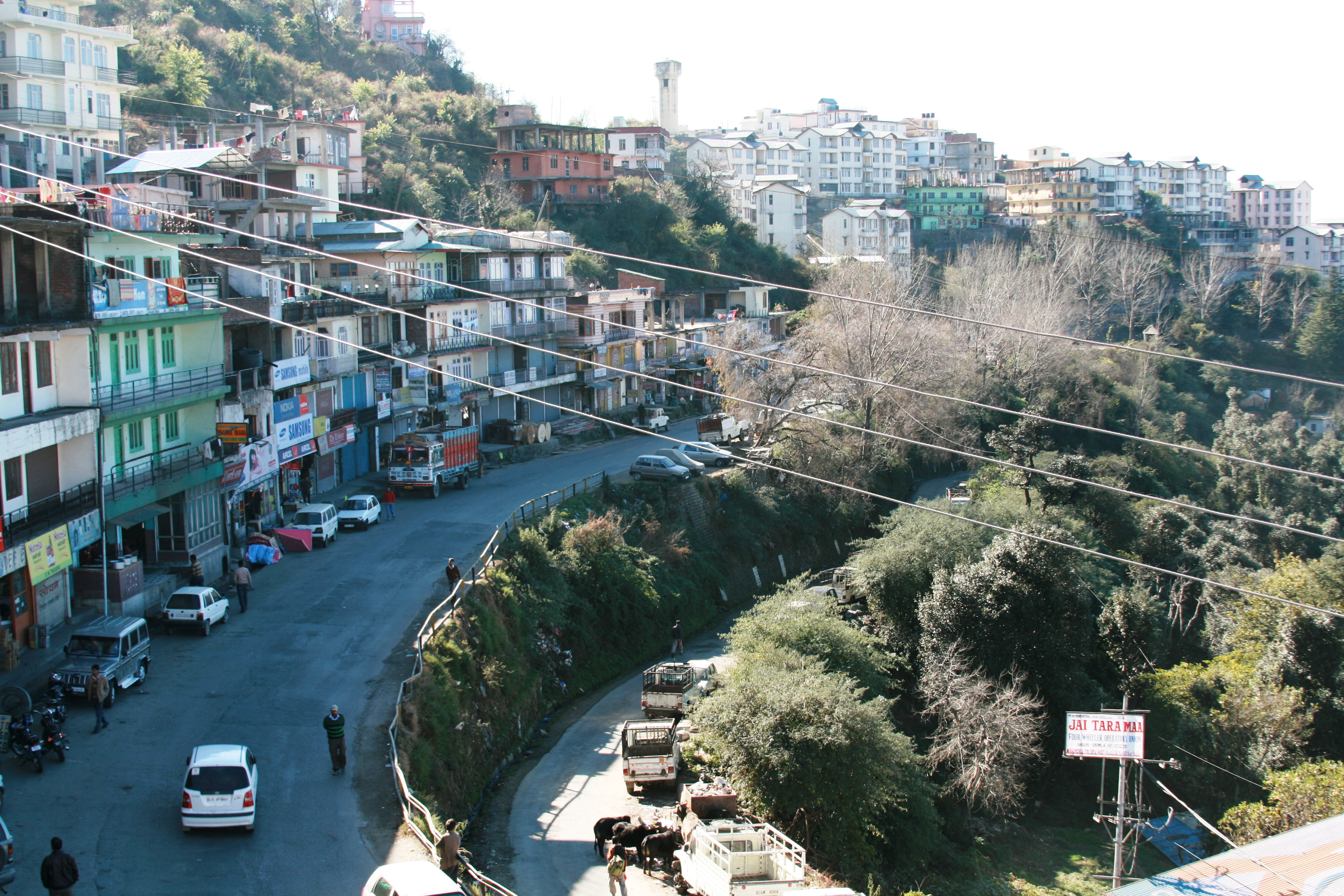
- Shimla-Chandigarh Highway passing through Shoghi
- Location of Shoghi near Shimla
- Coordinates: 31.04°N 77.12°E
- Country: India
- State: Himachal Pradesh
- District: Shimla

Area
  - Total: 95.21 ha (235.3 acres)
- Elevation: 1,790 m (5,873 ft)

Population (2011)
  - Total: 1,256
  - Density: 1,319/km^{2} (3,417/sq mi)

Languages
  - Official: Hindi
  - Regional: Mahasui (Keonthali)
- Time zone: UTC+5:30 (IST)
- PIN: 171219
- Vehicle registration: HP-51

Shoghi is a suburb adjacent to Shimla city of Himachal Pradesh, India. The suburb is situated 7 km away from Shimla main city Entry Gate at Taradevi. According to 15th Indian Census the suburb has a total population of 1,256 peoples with 685 male population and 571 female population. Shoghi is known as the region of temples.

== Population ==
Particulars	Total	Male	Female
Total Population	1,256	685	571
Literate Population	1,000	561	439
Illiterate Population	256	124	132

== Tourism ==
Located at 5873 feet above the sea level, Shoghi is a place of tourist attraction for Tara Devi Temple, Shri Hanuman Mandir, Mahunag Temple, Kali Mata Temple and others. Tourists can reach Shoghi from Shimla and Kalka by boarding the Himalayan Queen. People also can travel via taxis and buses available from Shimla.
