= Taradevi, Shimla =

Neighbourhood in Shimla, Himachal Pradesh, India

Taradevi
- Neighbourhood
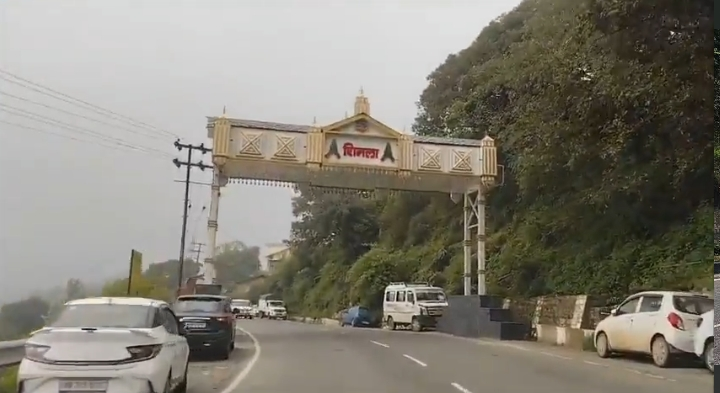
- Shimla city entry gate at Taradevi on NH - 5
- Interactive map of Taradevi
- Coordinates: 31.078479°N 77.141187°E
- Country: India
- State: Himachal Pradesh
- District: Shimla
- City: Shimla
- Elevation: 2,158 m (7,080 ft)
- PIN: 171010

Taradevi is a part of Shimla in the North Indian state of Himachal Pradesh. It is located in the south-western part of the city.

== Etymology ==
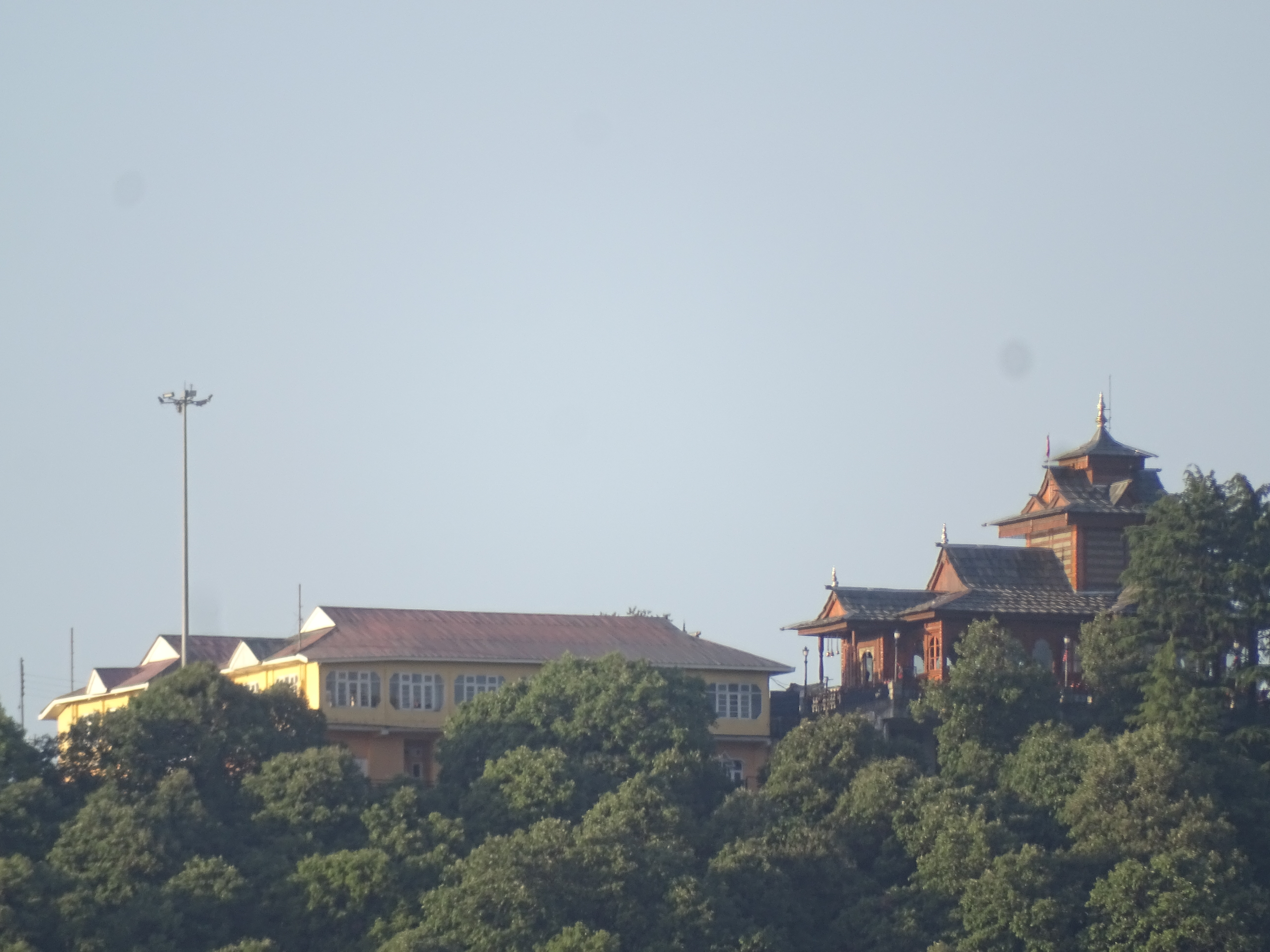
View of Tara Devi Temple from a meadow, in walking trail to temple

The area derives its name from the ancient Tara Devi Temple dedicated to Goddess Tara, regarded in Hindu traditions as a manifestation of the Goddess Parvati. Historical traditions connect the temple with the rulers of the former Keonthal State and Junga estate. According to local accounts, Raja Balbir Sen had a vision instructing him to establish the shrine atop the hill. The present temple tradition is believed to be around 250 years old. The temple hill is among the most spiritually significant high points around Shimla and attracts both pilgrims and tourists throughout the year.

== Geography ==
Views of NH-5, nearby villages and valleys from Tara Devi Temple, which is situated atop of a ridge.

Taradevi is a prominent hillside locality situated on the south-western side of Shimla along the historic Kalka-Shimla Railway, also has the railway station, Taradevi railway station. The area is spread across steep forested ridges overlooking deep valleys and forms part of the lower southern approach to Shimla city. The locality is positioned beside National Highway-5 (earlier NH-22), making it an important gateway zone before entering the denser urban core of Shimla. Taradevi is surrounded by localities of Shoghi, Kachi Ghati, Sankat Mochan Temple, and Jutogh. One of the most distinctive geographic features of Taradevi is its elevated ridge crowned by the famous Tara Devi Temple, from where wide panoramic views of the Shimla hills, deodar forests, and distant Himalayan ranges are visible.

== Importance ==
=== Railway importance ===
Taradevi is an important halt on the UNESCO heritage site, Kalka-Shimla Railway narrow-gauge mountain railway. The small Taradevi railway station is known for scenic mountain views, nearby forest trekking paths, and tunnel sections on the railway line. The station lies about 8 km from Shimla railway station and close to Tunnel No. 91, one of the longer tunnels on the route. The railway section around Taradevi is considered among the more picturesque stretches of the Kalka-Shimla line because of dense forests and curved hillside tracks.

=== Trekking and Forest Trails ===
Taradevi is known locally for forest walks and trekking routes. There is a popular walking trail that connects the main locality with the temple ridge through forested terrain. The route is considered as quite peaceful and scenic, especially during misty weather and post monsoon months. The area has deodar forests, meadow patches and hillside viewpoints. The atmosphere is quieter compared to central Shimla. Taradevi is often preferred for nature stays and retreats.
