= Shri Mahaveer Hanuman Mandir Khushala =

- श्री महावीर हनुमान मँदिर खुशाला
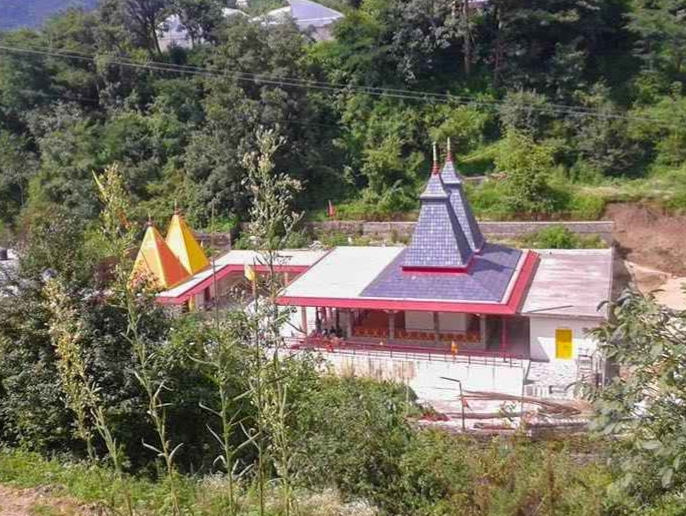
- Main temple as viewed from uphill

- Location in Himachal Pradesh Shri Mahaveer Hanuman Mandir Khushala (India)

Religion
- Affiliation: Hinduism
- District: Shimla
- Deity: Lord Hanuman and Radha Krishna
- Festivals: Vijayadashami, Diwali, Ram Navami, Hanuman Jayanti, Janmashtmi

Location
- Location: Lagru Road, Khushala, Shoghi, Shimla
- State: Himachal Pradesh
- Country: India
- Coordinates: 31°03′09″N 77°06′51″E

Architecture
- Style: Nagara architecture with Pahari influence

Specifications
- Elevation: 1,406.8 m (4,615 ft)

Shri Mahaveer Hanuman Mandir Khushala, also known as Thakurdwara, is a Hindu temple dedicated to Lord Hanuman located in Khushala village of Shoghi region in Shimla in the Northern Indian state of Himachal Pradesh. The temple is popular among locals as well as tourists.

== History and legends ==
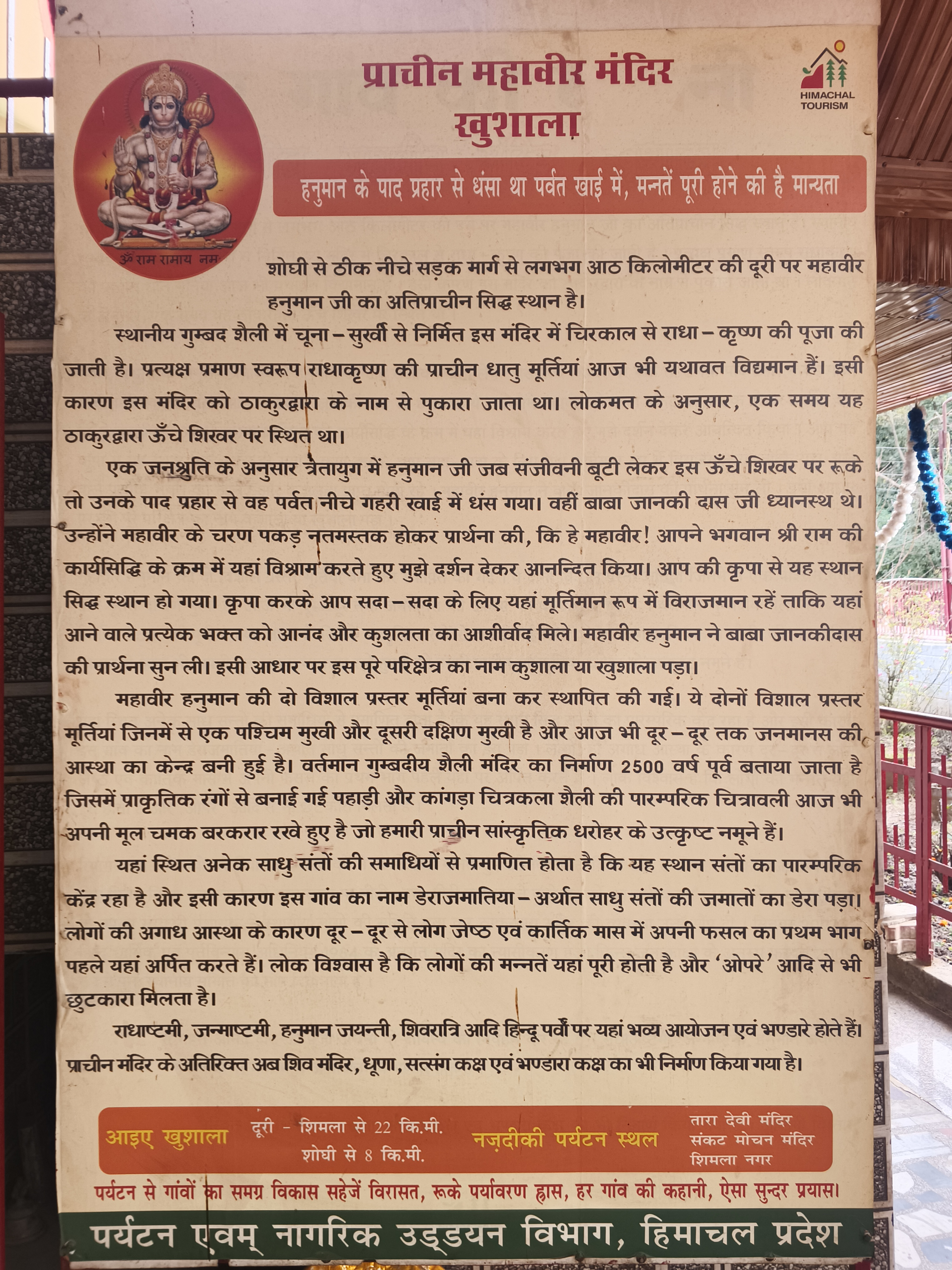
Temple's history written on board inside temple's premises

The temple was established as Radha Krishna temple as the metal idols of Radha Krishna are still there and worshipped, that's why the temple's older name was "Thakurdwara". Earlier in ancient times the Thakurdwara temple used to be on the peak but according to a legend, in Treta Yuga when Lord Hanuman was on the way of taking Sanjivani from Dronagiri to Lanka for saving Shri Lakshmana's life, he stopped for a while on that peak and because of his strength, the mountain got dumped in the trench. At that time "Baba Jankidas" was meditating there, when Baba saw "Shri Hanuman Ji", he folded his hands and caught Shri Hanuman Ji's feet and showed his extreme and deep Bhakti (devotion) and prayed to him that "Lord Hanuman, you are in the path of Dharma by serving Shri Rama and in that duty you gave me Darshan (sight) and made my life meaningful, Shri Hanuman I request you to kindly enthroned here in the idol form and make your other devotees' life meaningful and efficient too by your Darshan". Lord Hanuman accepted his faithful request and that's how the temple became the temple dedicated to Lord Hanuman and that's the reason behind the place and temple got its name as Khushala or Kushala (meaning: efficiency). The temple has many paintings in Pahari and Kangra painting style which even today retain their artwork as before and shows the cultural heritage of the temple. The temple has dome styled architecture and said to have been built around 2,500 years ago.

== Belief ==
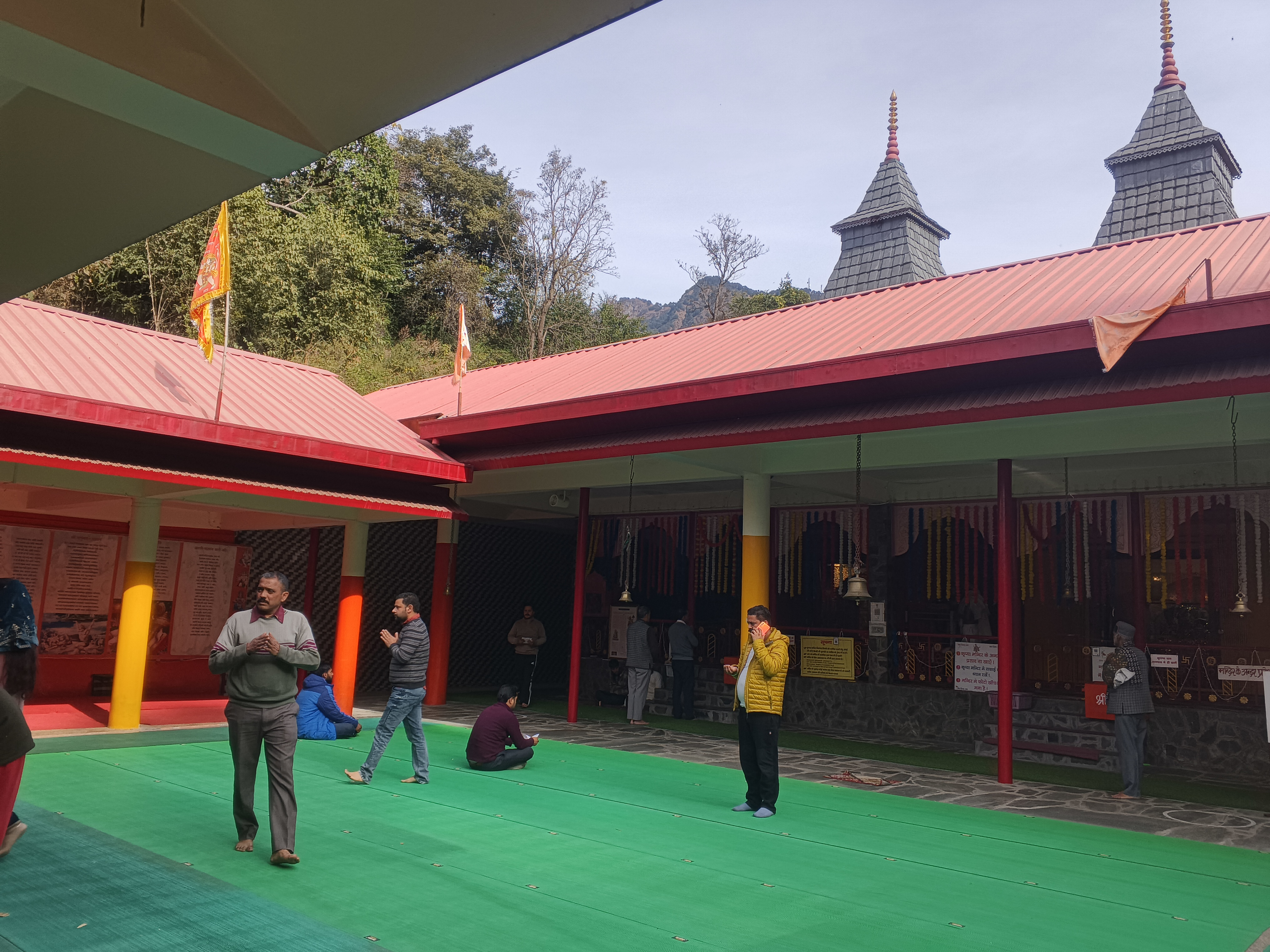
Main temple premises

There are two main and massive statues of Shri Mahaveer Hanuman have been installed. These two statues are facing in different directions, one faces West and the other faces South. The temple has always been an important place for saints as there are many Samadhis of the saints in the temple premises and that is the reason behind another name of the temple "Derajamatiya", meaning "encampment of saints". The devotees have deep faith in the temple as devotees from far away visit here and present their first crop from harvest as their faithful offerings to the Lord especially in the months of Jyeshtha and Kartika. Devotees believe that Mahaveer Hanuman saves them from all evils and they got rid of all the problems of their lives because of the grace of the Lord. On every Sunday, auspacious occasions and festivals Bhandara is organised in the temple.

== Location and Accessibility ==
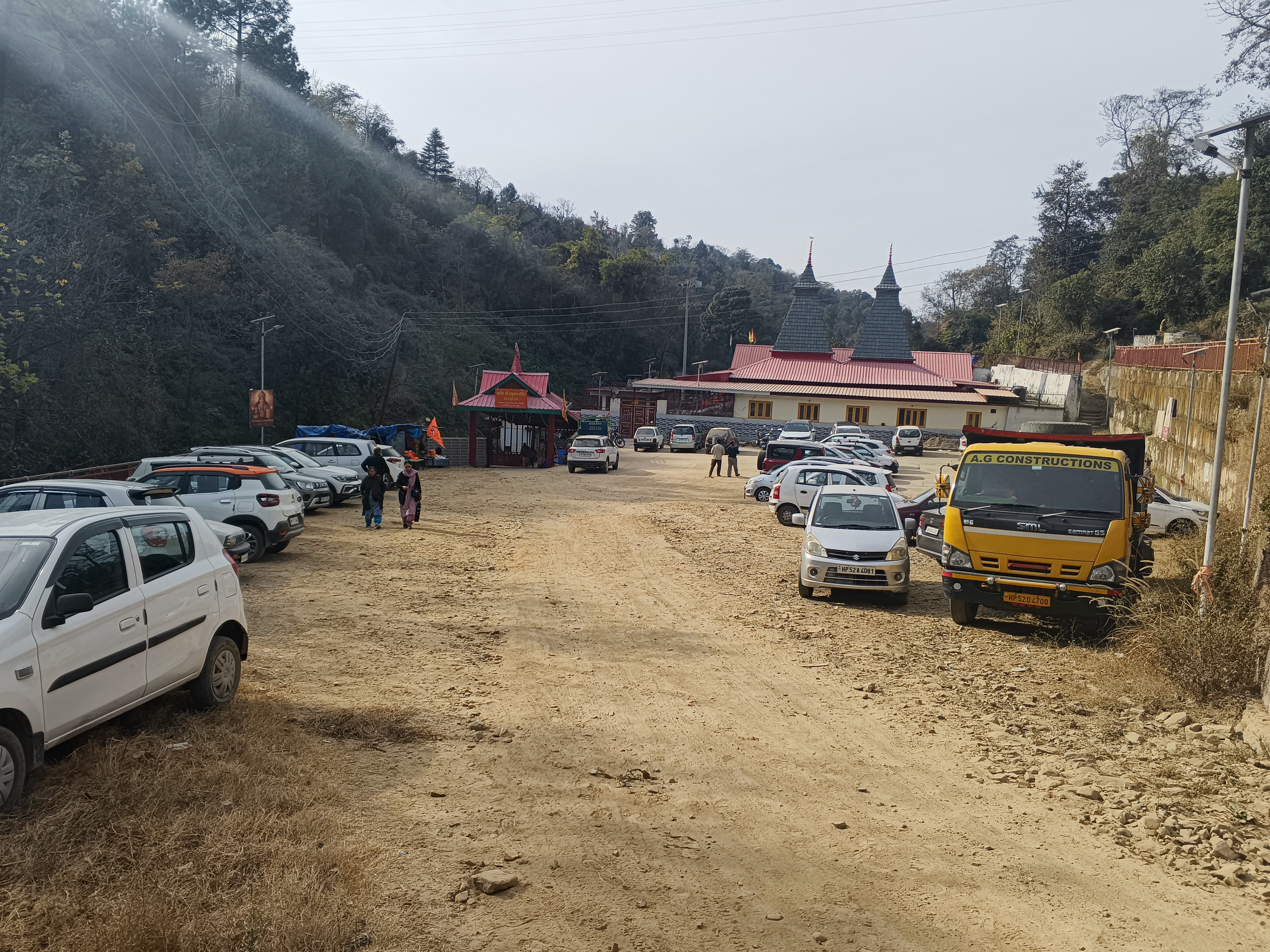
Parking outside the temple

The temple is located in a valley in the village Khushala on Lagroo road below 5 kilometres (3.1 mi) from Shoghi and is 11 kilometres (6.8 mi) from the main city Shimla's Welcome Gate at Taradevi. It falls in Lagroo Panchayat. The temple is accessible by buses, taxis or private vehicles. The temple has a huge parking besides its entry gate. The temple is located in serene and solitary environment around lush green trees and nature.

== See also ==
- Jakhu Temple
- Sankat Mochan Temple
