= Sankat Mochan Temple, Shimla =

Hindu temple in Shimla, Himachal Pradesh, India

Coordinates: 31.085336°N 77.142533°E

Sankat Mochan Temple
- संकट मोचन मंदिर
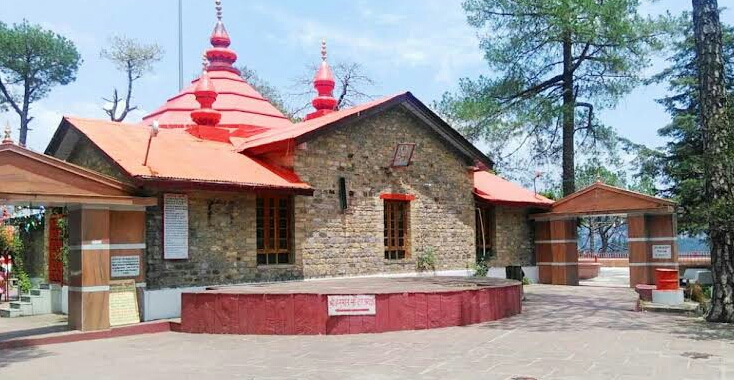
- Frontal premises of Sankat Mochan Temple

- Location within Himachal Pradesh Location within India

Religion
- Affiliation: Hinduism
- District: Shimla
- Deity: Hanuman

Location
- Location: Shimla
- State: Himachal Pradesh
- Country: India

Architecture
- Type: Hindu temple architecture
- Founder: Neem Karoli Baba
- Established: 1950
- Groundbreaking: 1962
- Completed: 1966
- Elevation: 1,975 m (6,480 ft)

Sankat Mochan Temple is a Hindu temple, dedicated to Hindu deity Hanuman in Shimla, Himachal Pradesh, India. The temple is Shimla's second most visited Hanuman temple after Jakhu Temple. It was established in 1950 by noted religious figure, Neem Karoli Baba.

== History ==
The temple was established in 1950 by Neem Karoli Baba, after he spent 10–12 days in the forest area. While meditating, he got some instinct that Hanuman temple should be built on the site. Baba told his wish to his followers and eventually in the year of 1962 the then Lieutenant Governor Bajrang Bahadur Singh and other followers started the construction of the temple. The idols of Rama-Sita-Lakshmana, Shiva and Ganesha were also established in the temple. The temple was inaugurated on 21 June 1966 on the day of Tuesday. Gradually the temple gained a lot of popularity and faith.

Neem Karoli Baba sculpture in Sankat Mochan Temple

== Present ==
At present the locals come here everyday, as well as tourists who visit Shimla. Because it is Lord Hanuman temple, every Tuesday and Saturday a lot of people visit, and on Sundays huge number of people visit the temple. On each Sunday a large Bhandara is also organised here. In the vicinity of the temple there is also the small temple dedicated to Neem Karoli Baba, which was made in 1998. The view of Shimla city is also seen from the temple.

== Location ==
The temple is located at an altitude of 1,975 m above sea level on Chandigarh-Shimla highway. The natural forested environment attracts tourists. Views of Shimla city are also seen from the temple.

== In popular culture ==
The temple is shown in 2026 Bollywood film Hanuman Ansh, which is based on the life of Neem Karoli Baba.

== See also ==
- Shri Mahaveer Hanuman Mandir Khushala
- Jakhu Temple
- Kali Bari Temple
- Tara Devi Temple
