= Shri Hanuman Jakhu (statue) =

Statue in Shimla, Himachal Pradesh, India

- श्री हनुमान जाखू
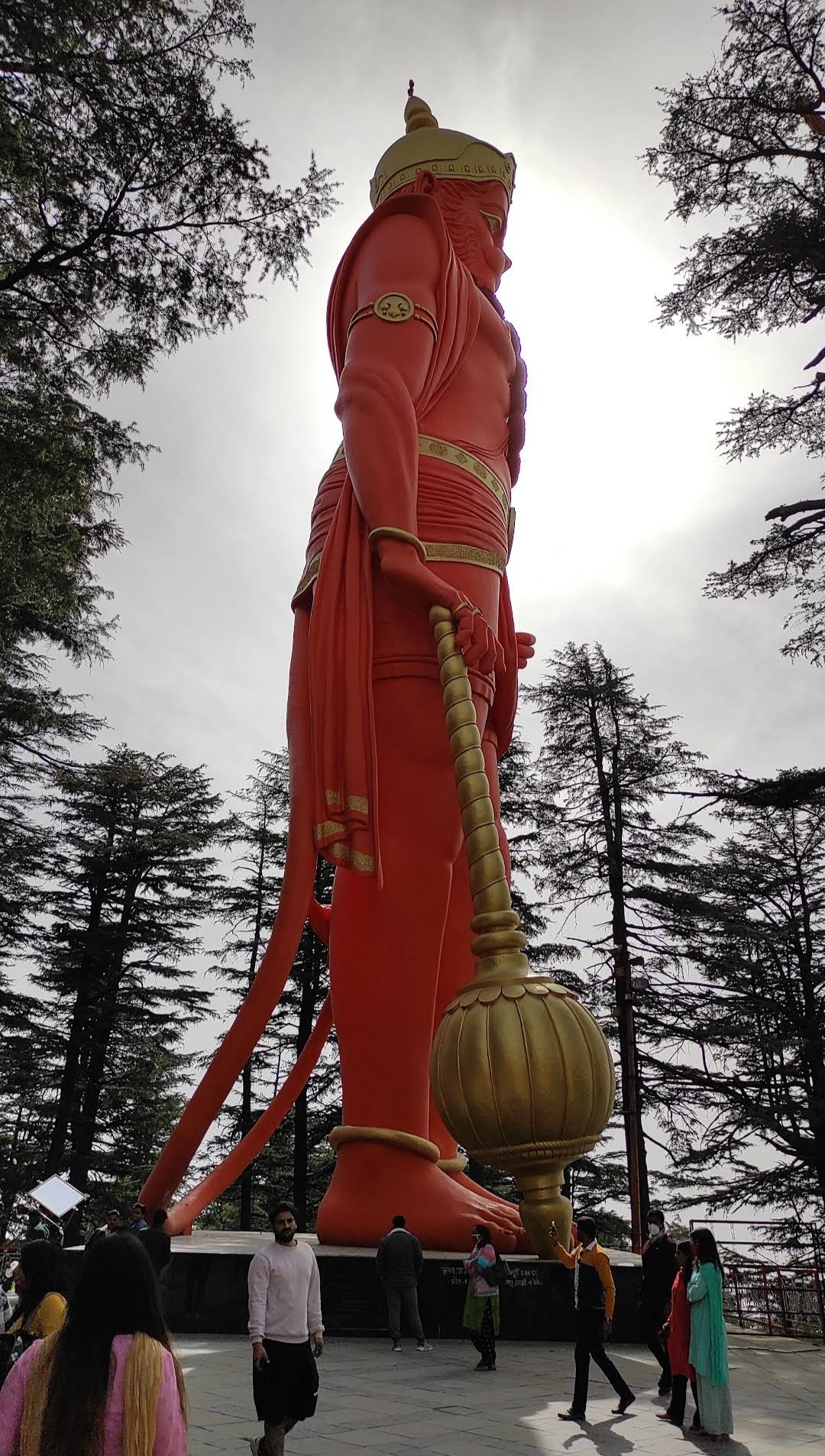
- Shri Hanuman Jakhu statue during daytime with devotees arriving at temple
- Interactive map of Shri Hanuman Jakhu
- Location: Jakhu Temple, Jakhu Hill, Shimla, Himachal Pradesh, India
- Coordinates: 31.1012°N 77.1840°E
- Type: Statue
- Height: 33 metres (108 feet)
- Beginning date: 2008
- Completion date: 2010
- Inauguration date: 2010
- Dedicated to: Lord Hanuman

Shri Hanuman Jakhu is a statue of Lord Hanuman situated under the periphery of Jakhu Temple on Jakhu Hill in Shimla. It is one of the tallest statues of the deity at a height of 33 metres (108 feet).

== Legacy ==
The statue is built on the Jakhu Hill which is the highest hill out of the seven hills of Shimla. Its construction was started in 2008 and completed in the year 2010, inaugurated and built by the Managing Director of JHS Svendgaard Laboratories Ltd, the largest oral-care manufacturing Company in India, Nikhil Nanda and the then Chief Minister of Himachal Pradesh, Prem Kumar Dhumal. The statue is a gift by the HC Nanda Charitable Trust to the state. The statue is 108 feet tall and overlooks the city of Shimla from the 8,850 foot hilltop. It has been filed in the Guinness Book of World Record as the tallest Statue of Shri Hanuman in the world. The statue towers high above the tall Deodar trees and is visible from several parts of Shimla. The temple area around the statue has been developed so that visiting families can spend time comfortably here. A park is built with swings and slides is located in the temple premisis. Many devotees from different parts of the nation come and visit the temple everyday to seek strength, peace and sanity.

== View ==
The statue can be seen from all parts of the city as well as from Solan.

== Gallery ==
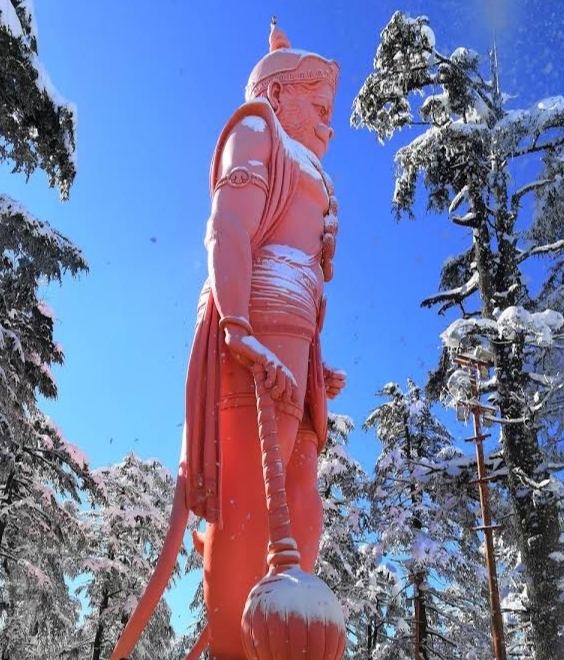
Shri Hanuman Statue during snow

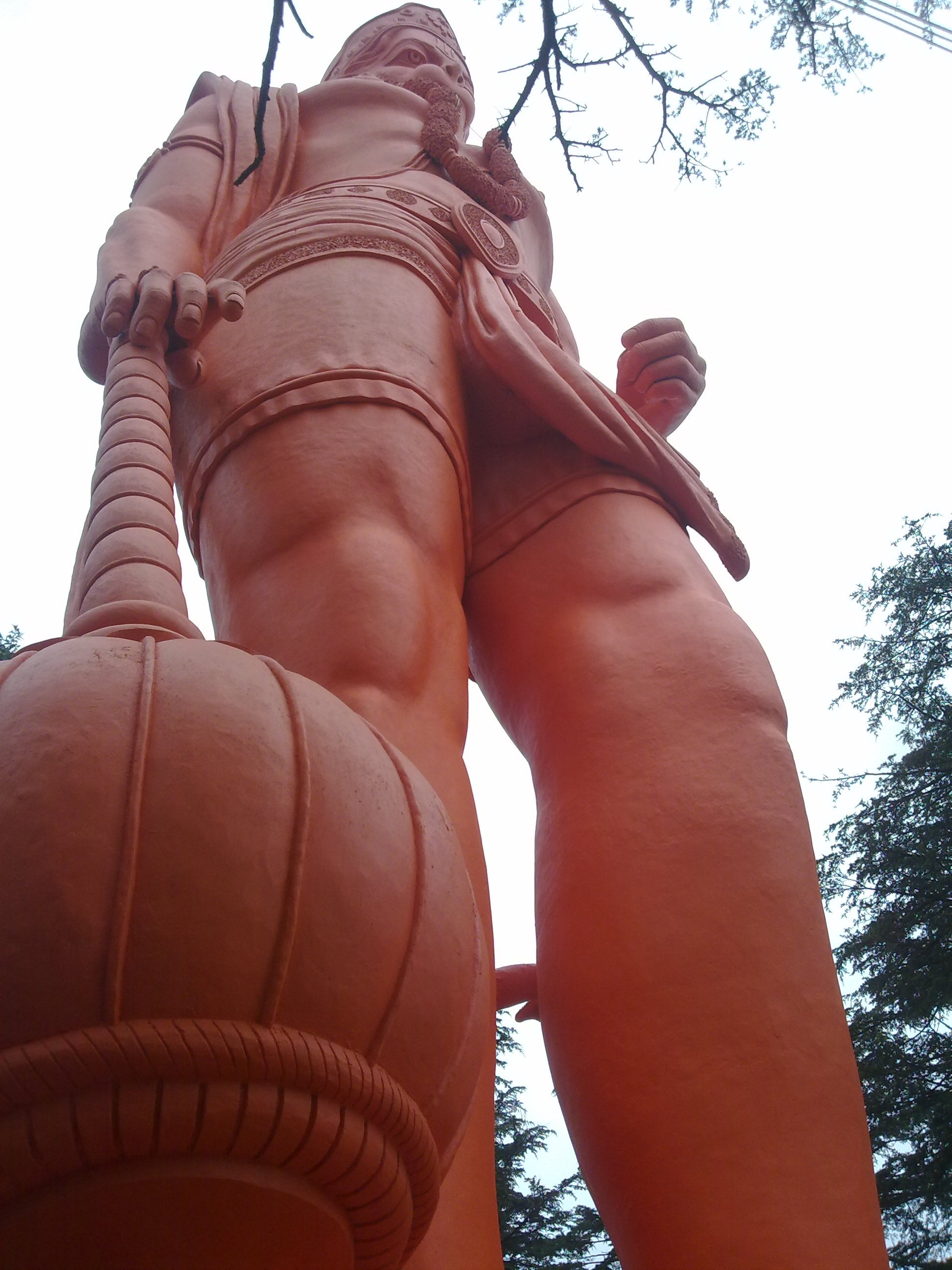
Shri Hanuman statue height obeserving closely

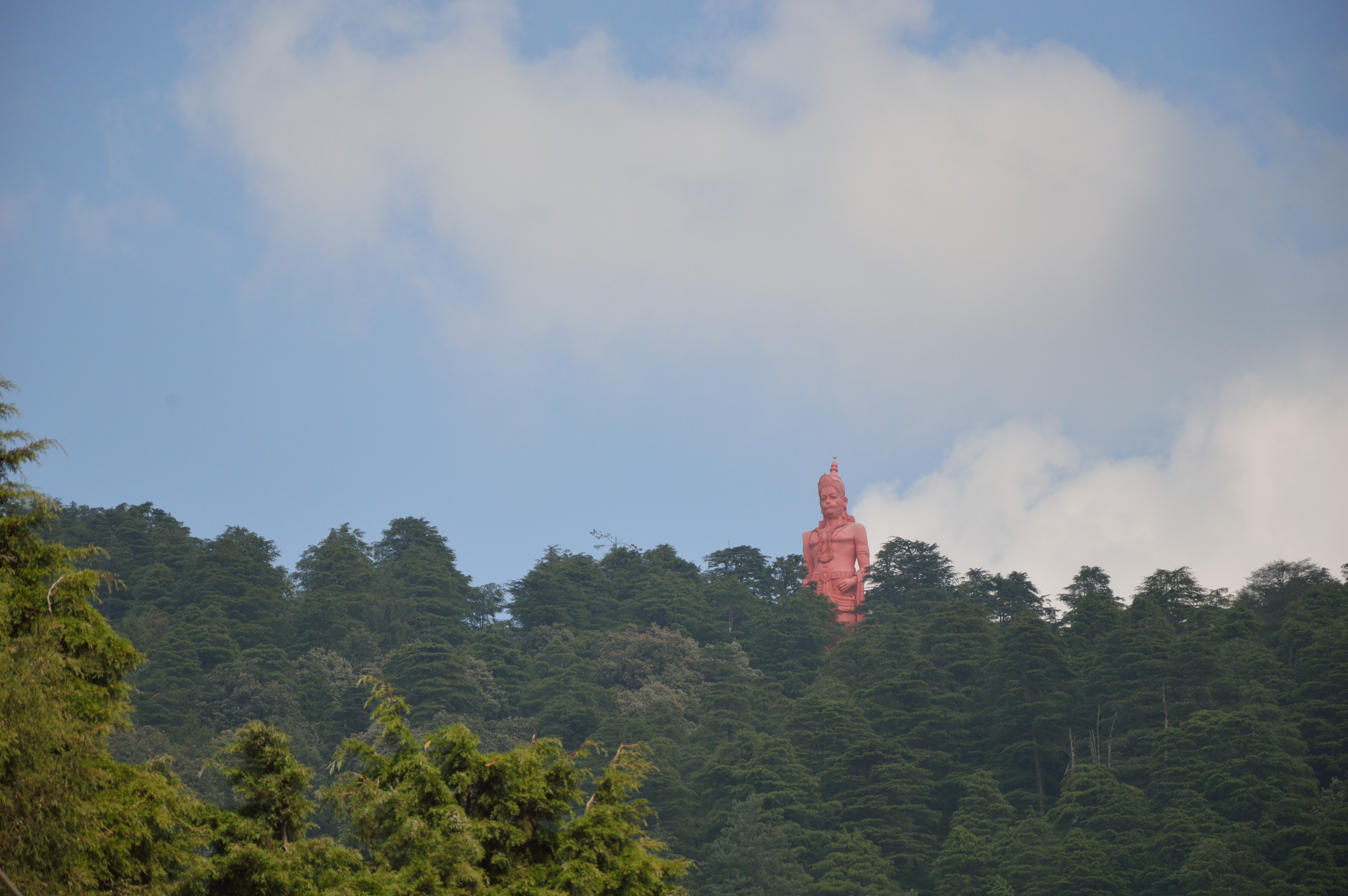
Shri Hanuman Statue downhill view

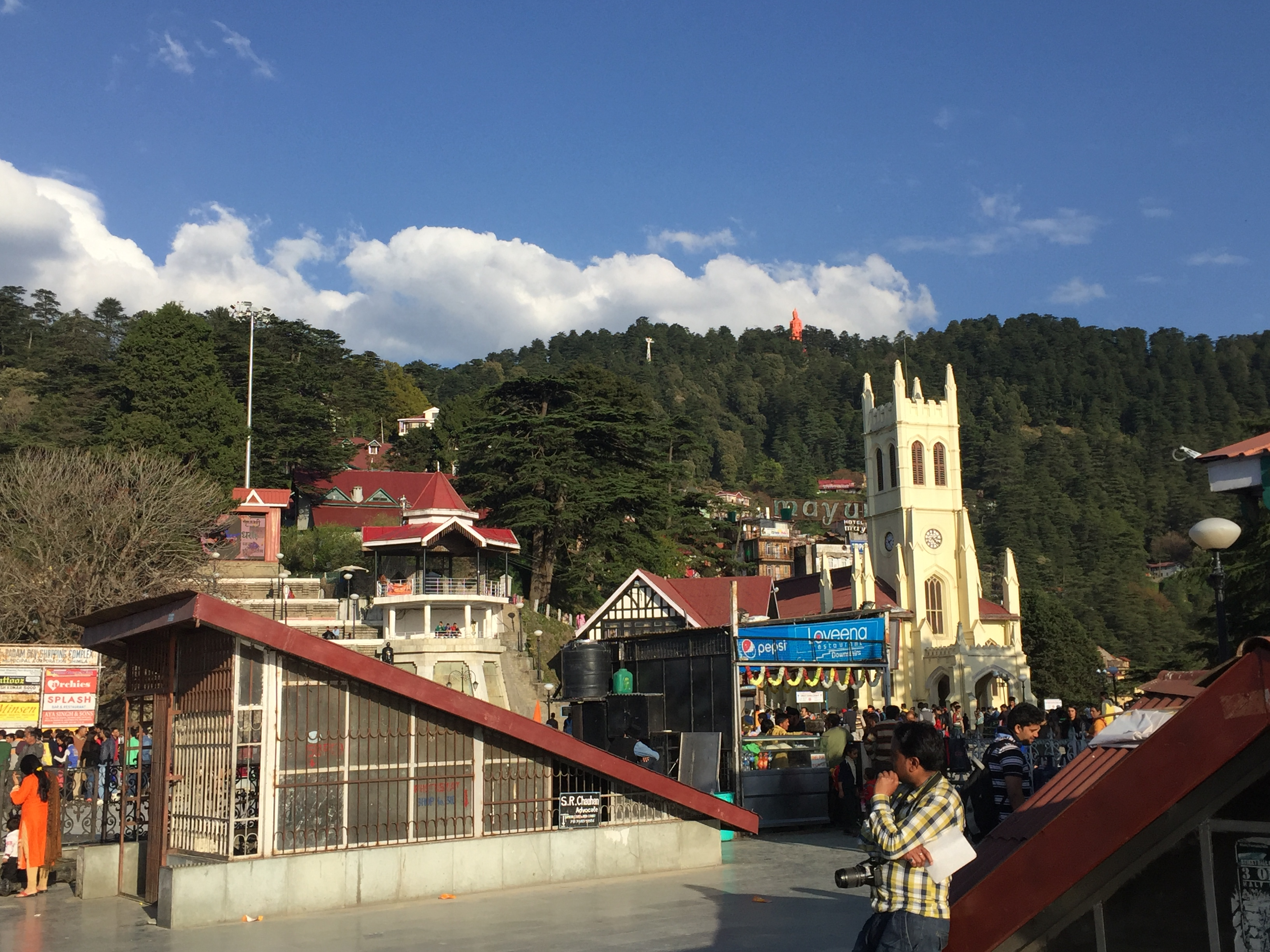
Shri Hanuman Statue can be seen from The Ridge

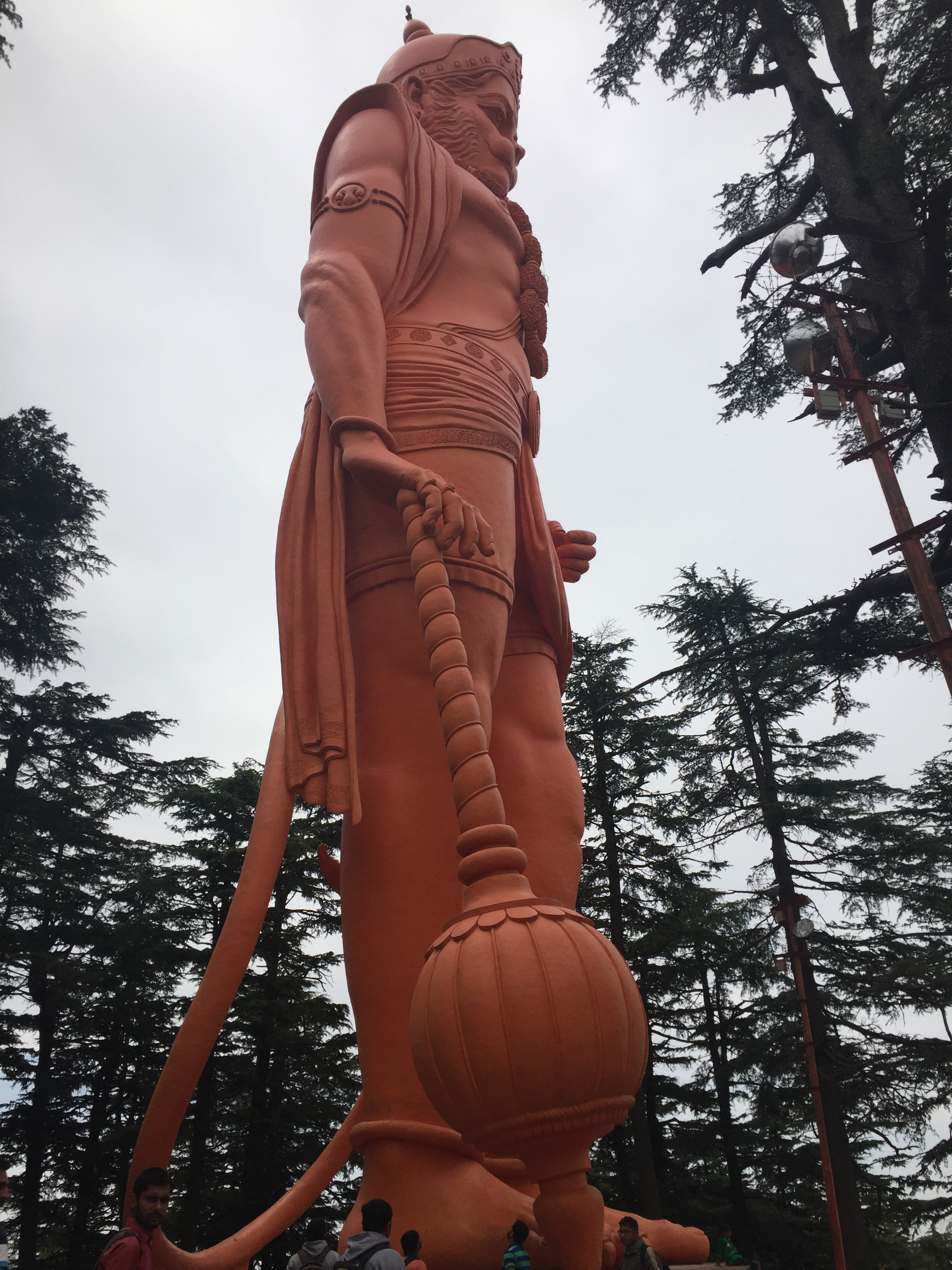
Close view
