= Jakhu Temple =

Hindu temple in Shimla, India

- जाखू मंदिर
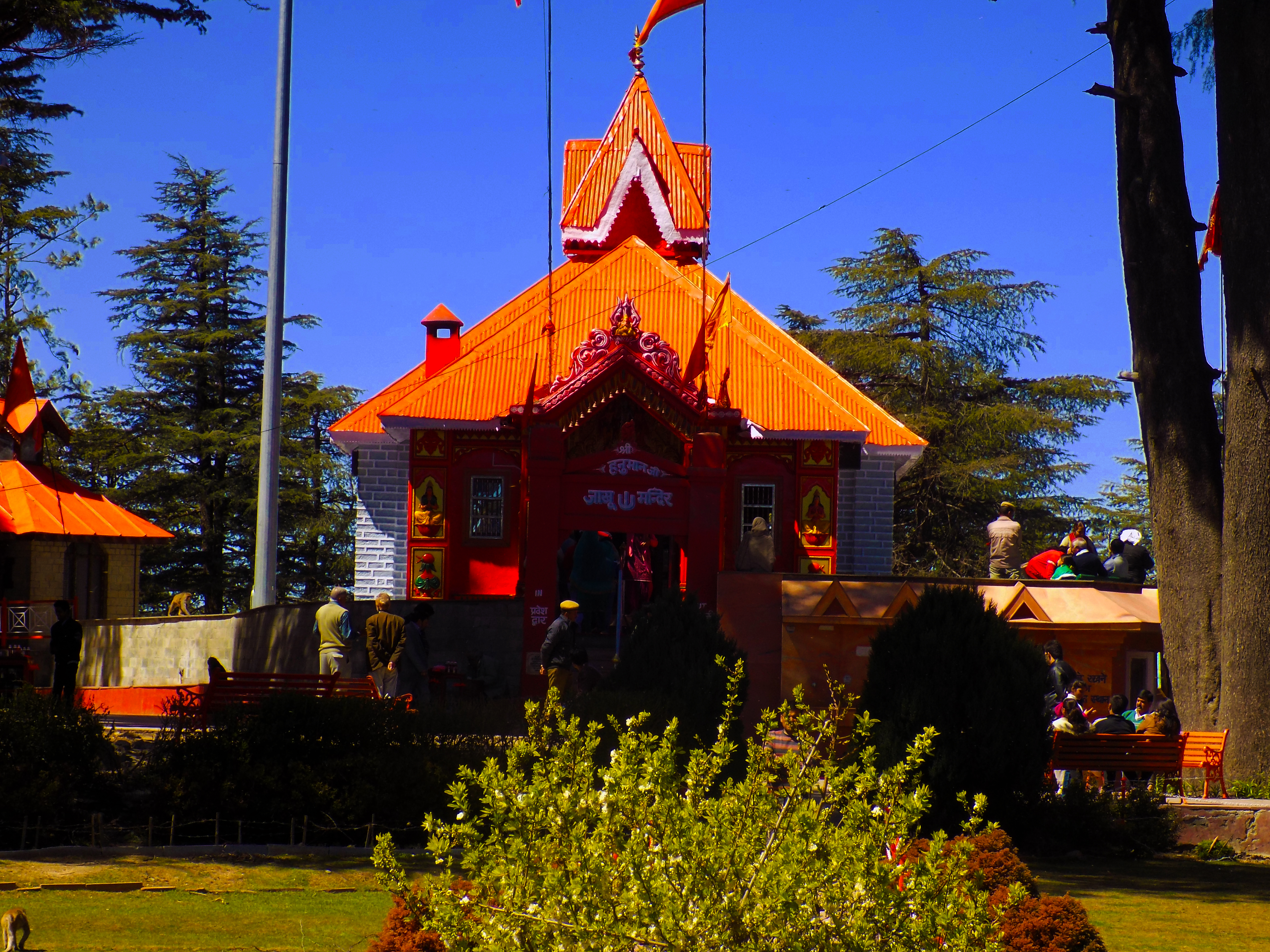
- Front view of the temple

- Location within Himachal Pradesh Location within India

Religion
- Affiliation: Hinduism
- District: Shimla
- Deity: Hanuman
- Festival: Dussehra

Location
- Location: Jakhu Hill, Shimla
- State: Himachal Pradesh
- Country: India
- Coordinates: 31.1011706°N 77.1818317°E

Architecture
- Style: Kath kuni architecture
- Founder: Yaksha Rishi

Specifications
- Elevation: 2,467 m (8,094 ft)

Website
- https://jakhumandir.online/

Jakhu Temple (also Jakhoo Temple) is an ancient Hindu temple in Shimla, Himachal Pradesh, India, dedicated to the Hindu deity Lord Hanuman. It is situated at Jakhu Hill, Shimla's highest peak, 2.5 km (1.6 mi) east of the Ridge at a height of 2,455 m (8,054 ft) above sea level. Every year, a festival is held on Dussehra, before 1972 the festival used to be held at Annadale. Shri Hanuman Ji's statue is situated in the temple premises.

A giant 108-feet-high idol of Hanuman was unveiled at Jakhu Hanuman temple on 4 November 2010. The cost of construction was Rs 1.5 crores. The public unveiling was officiated by Abhishek Bachchan.

The temple is accessible by foot, horse, taxi or ropeway. The Jakhu Ropeway is an aerial lift that links a point near the centre of Shimla to the temple. It was developed by Jagson International Limited and opened in 2017.

== Gallery ==
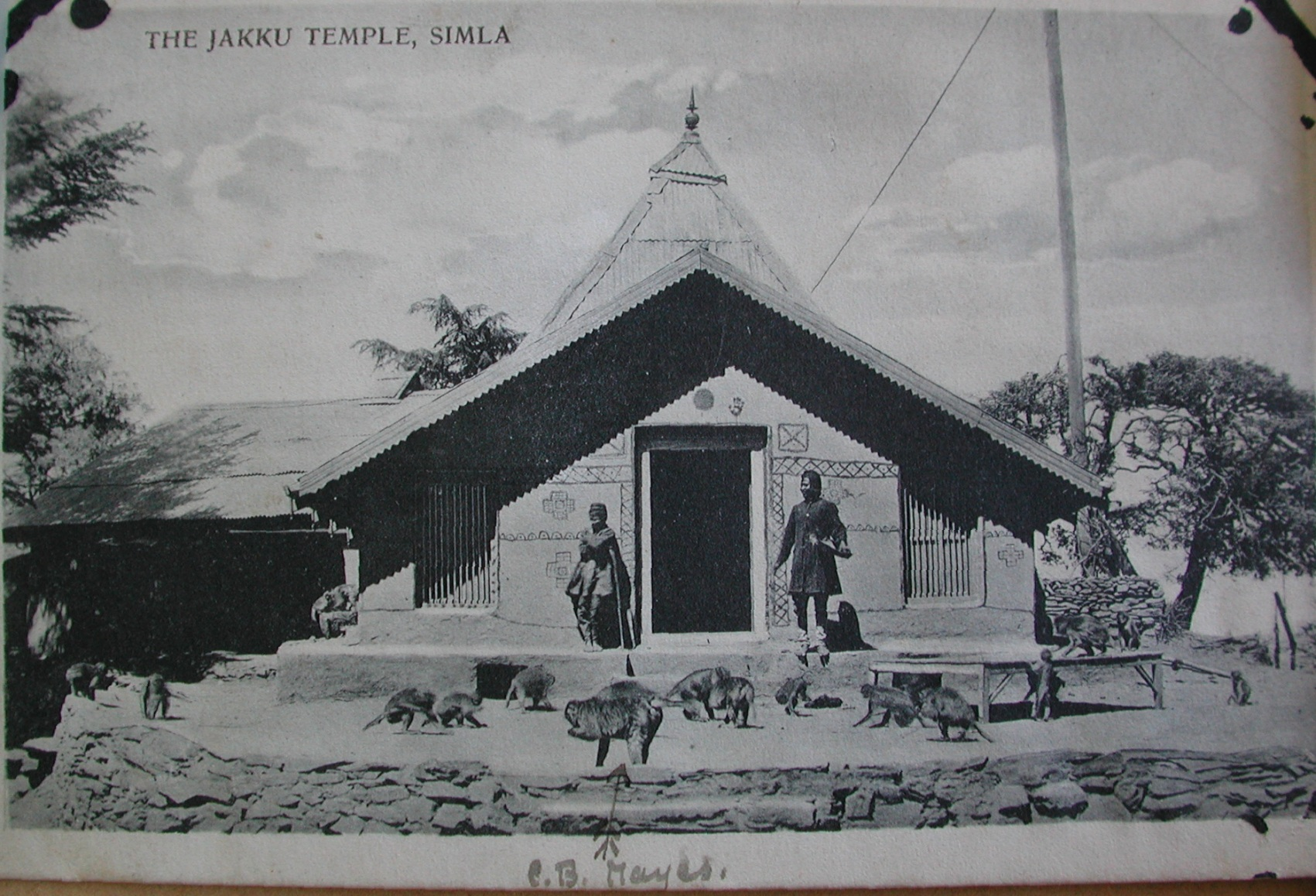
1912 postcard showing the Jakhu Temple and monkeys

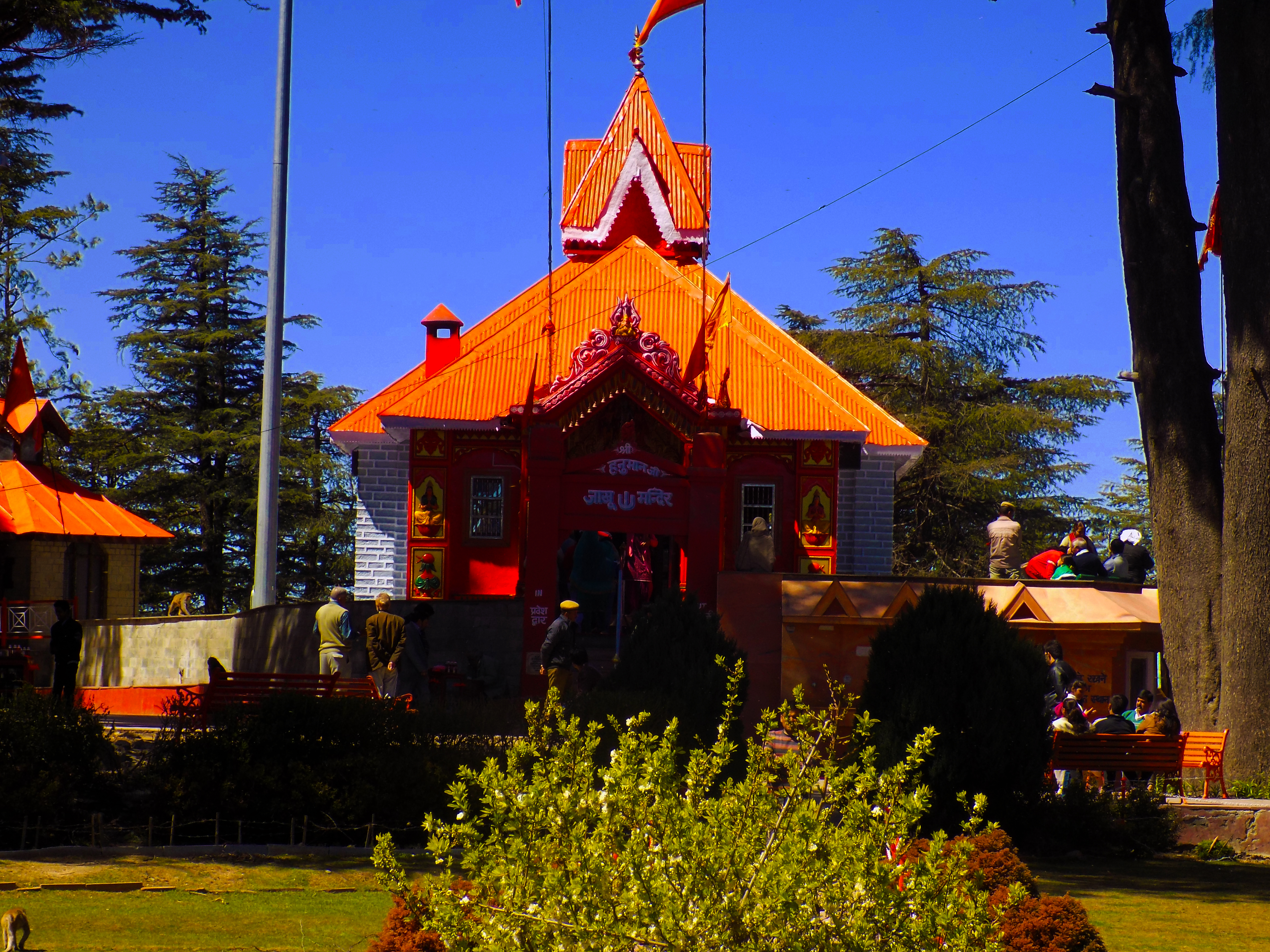
Jakhu Temple

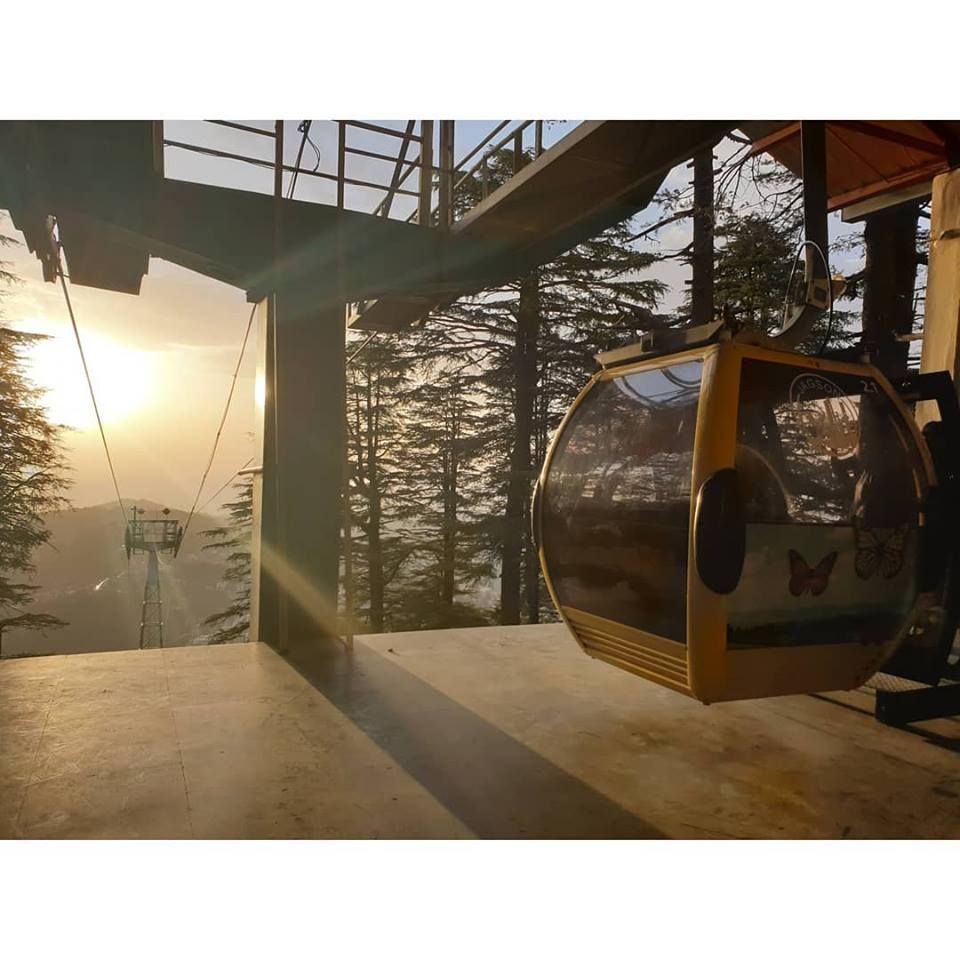
Jakhu Temple Ropeway

A monkey at the entrance of the Jakhu Temple

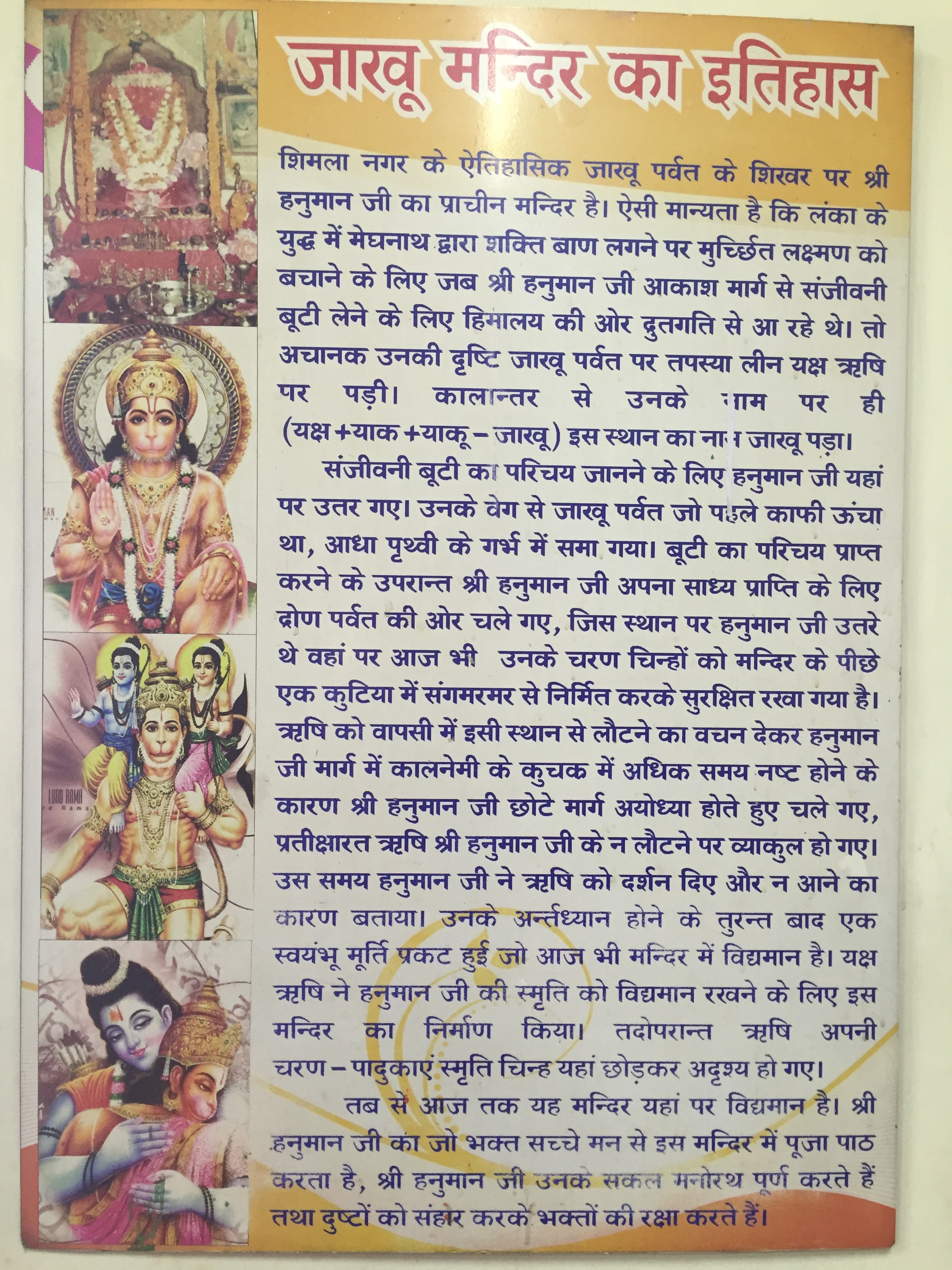
The detailed story as stated at the Temple

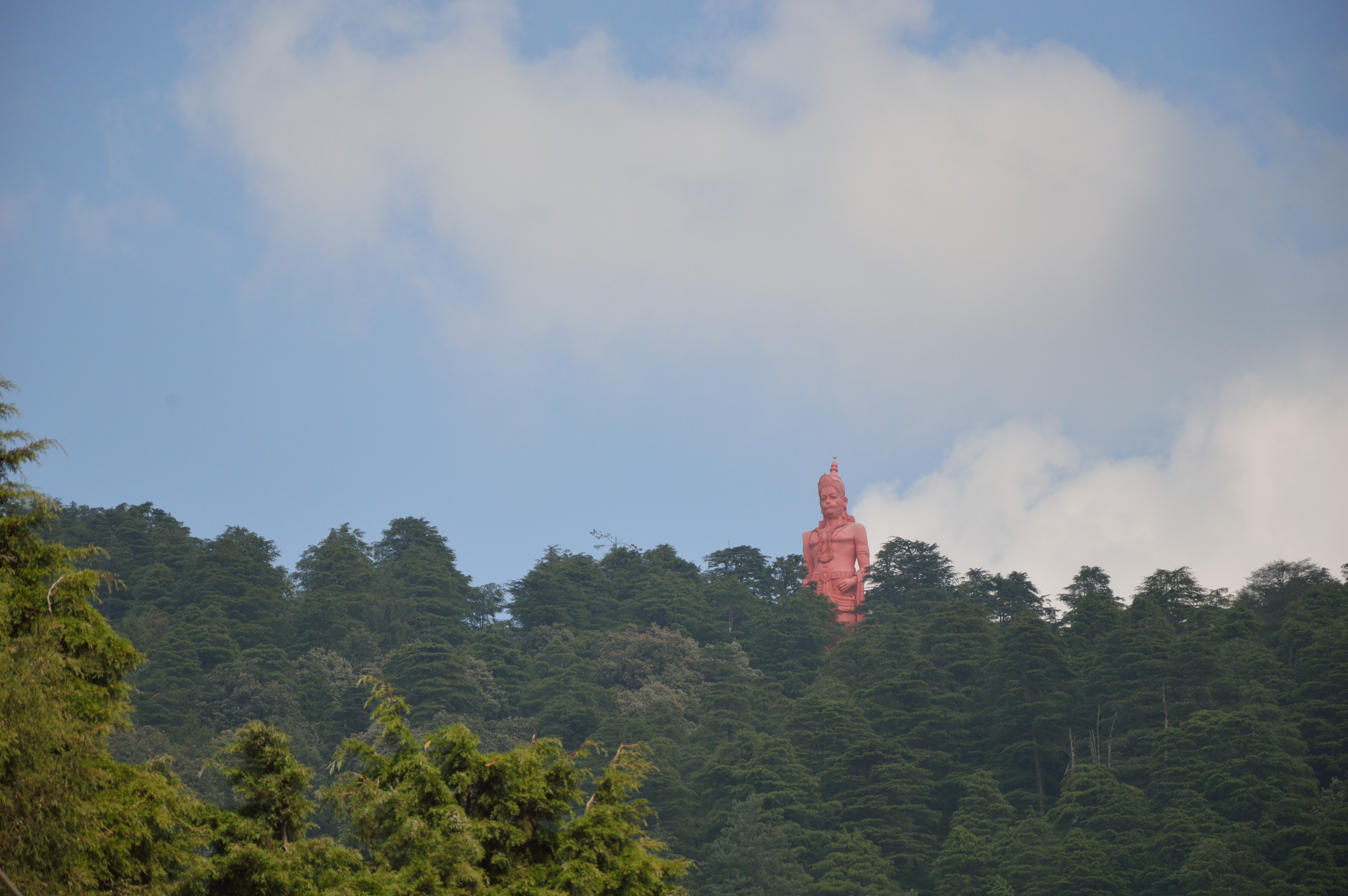
Shri Hanuman Statue

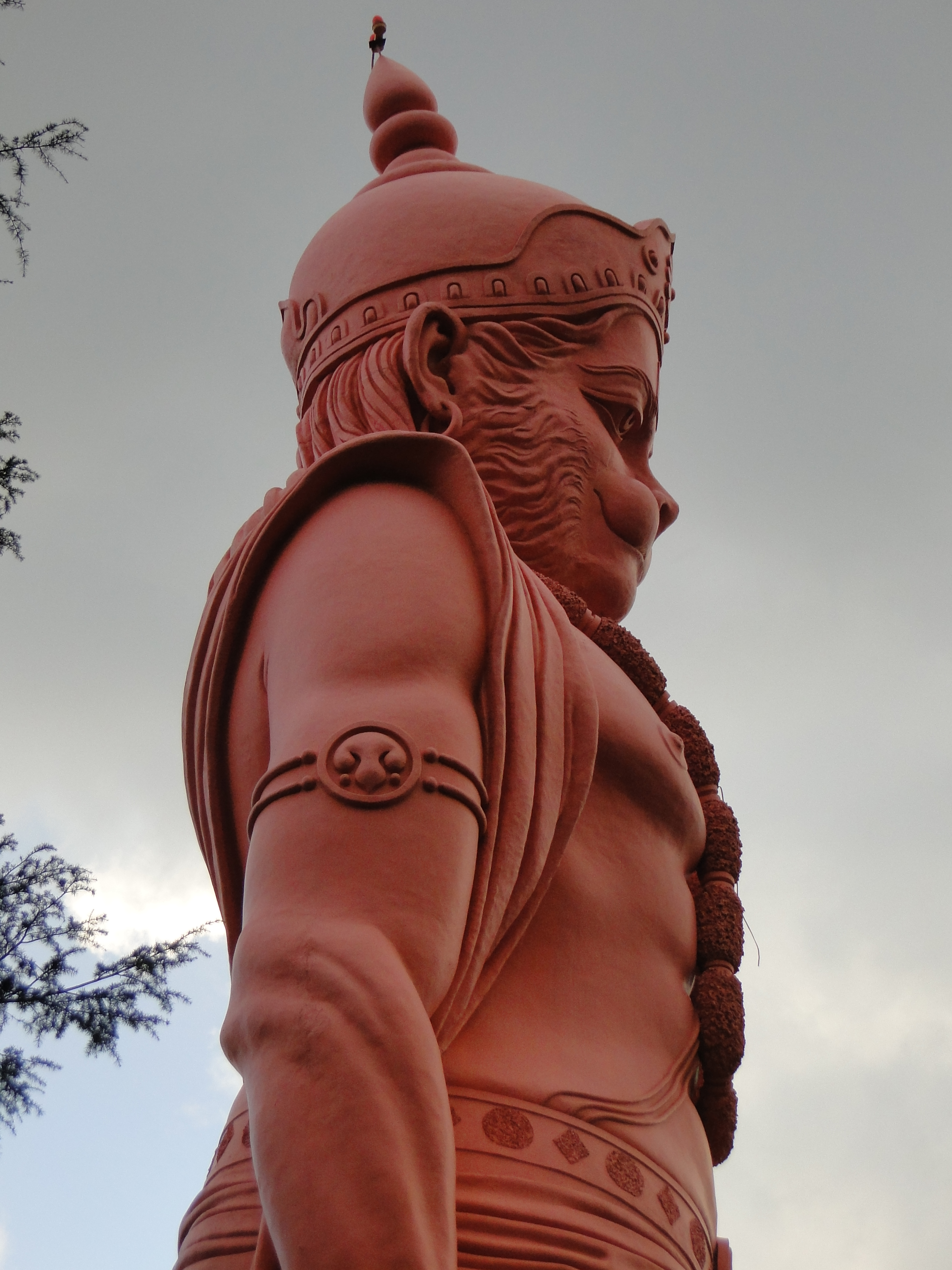
Shri Hanuman Statue in Jakhu Temple

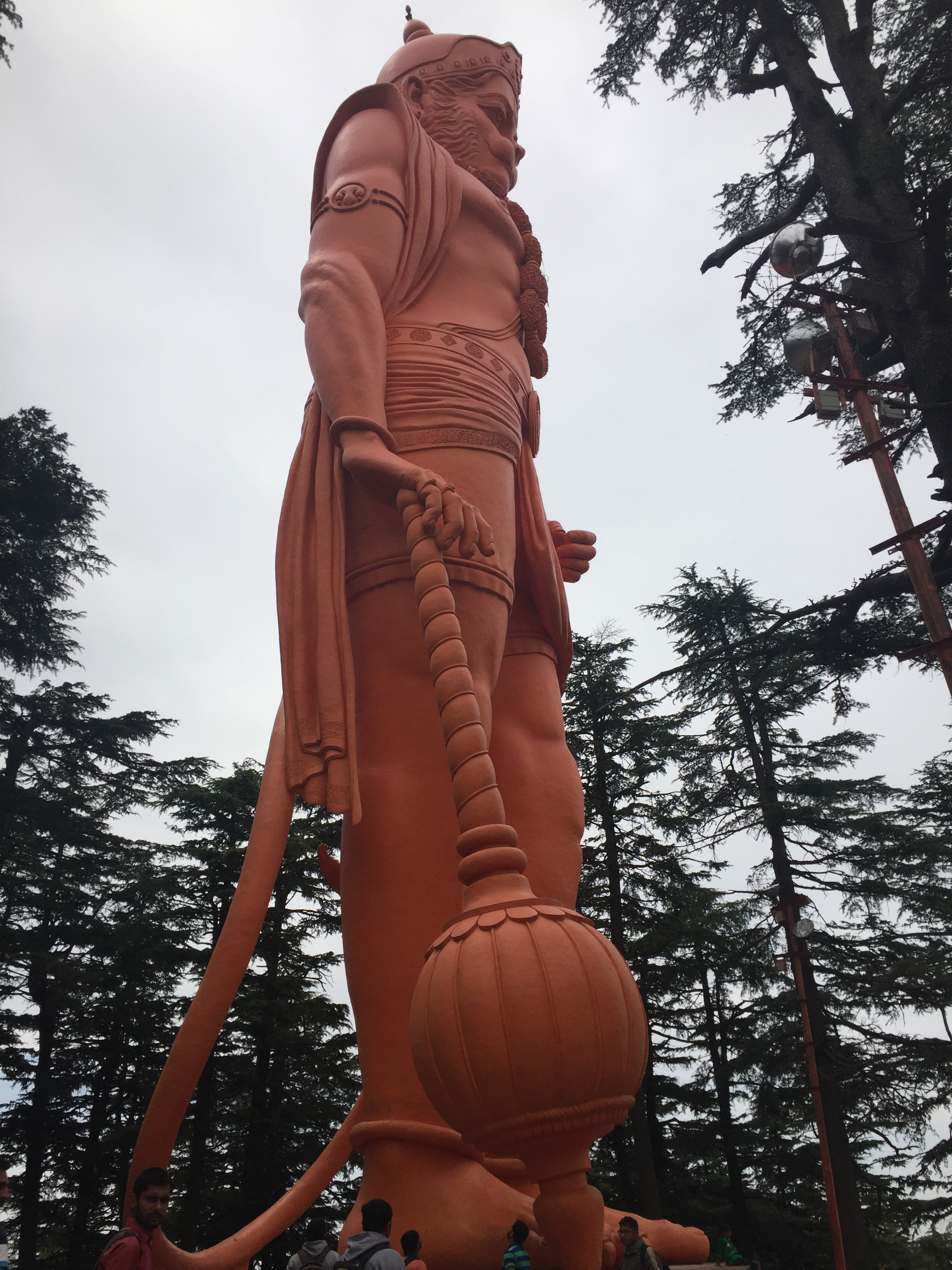
One of the tallest statue in the world Shri Hanuman Statue

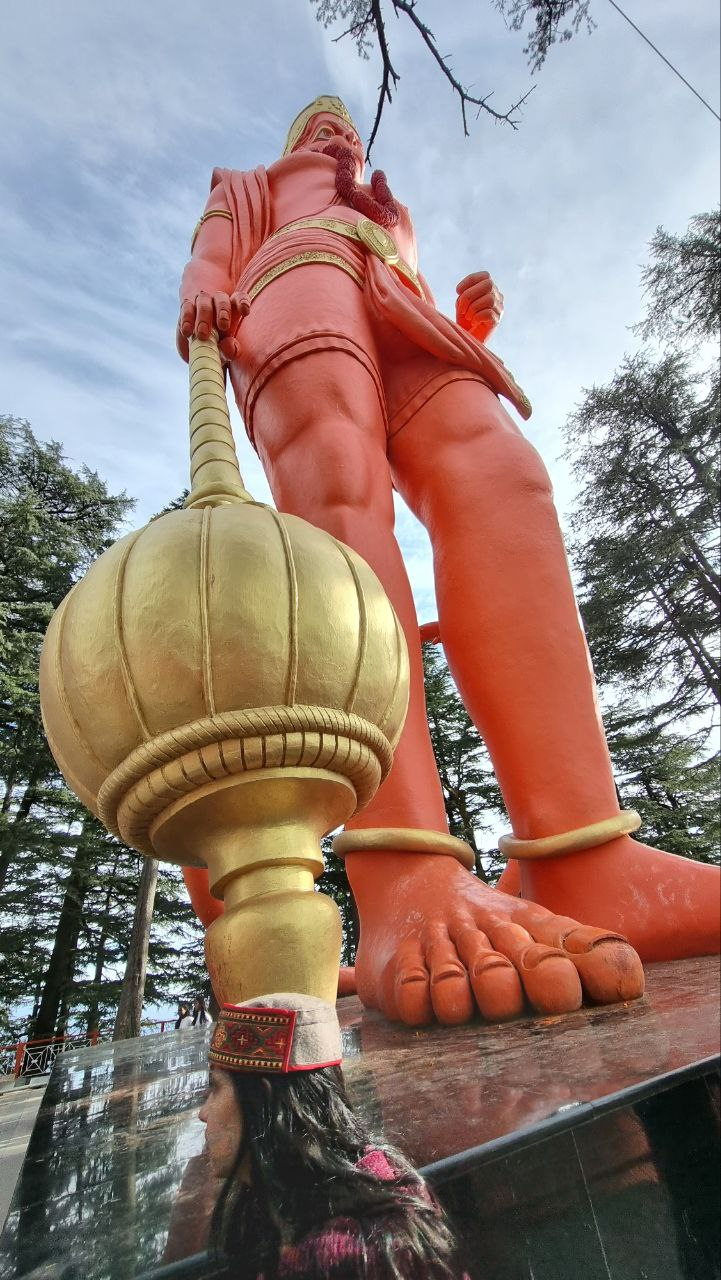
Statue of God Shree Hanuman at Jakhu Temple.

== See also ==
- Shri Mahaveer Hanuman Mandir Khushala
- Sankat Mochan Temple
