= Tara Devi Temple =

- तारा देवी मंदिर
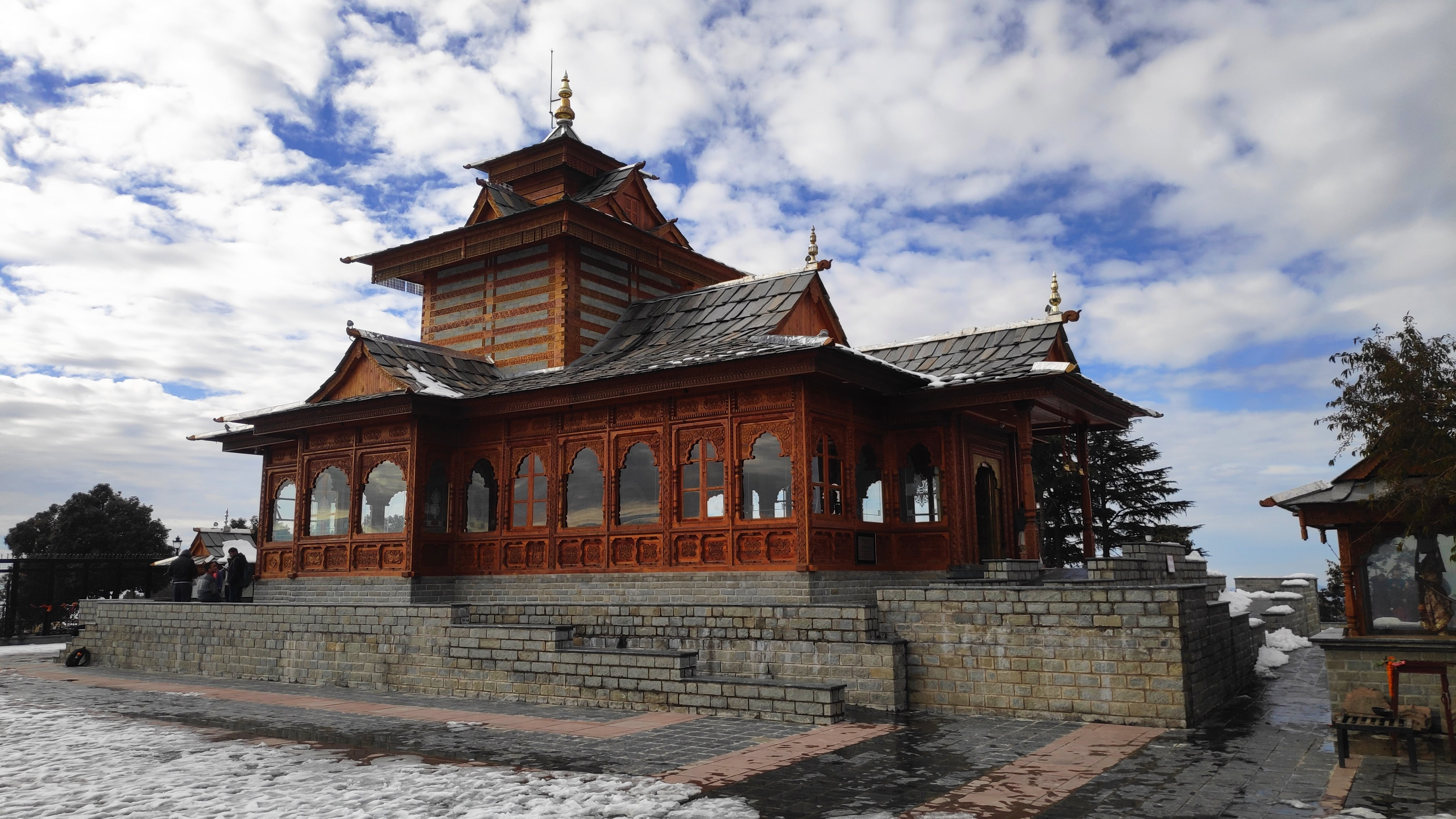
- Tara Devi Temple

Religion
- Affiliation: Hinduism
- District: Shimla
- Status: Open

Location
- Location: Shimla
- State: Himachal Pradesh
- Country: India
- Interactive map of Tara Devi Temple
- Coordinates: 31.054°N 77.142°E

Architecture
- Style: Kath kuni architecture
- Creator: राजा भूपेंद्र सेन
- Established: 1766
- Monument: beautiful idol made out of "Ashtadhatu"

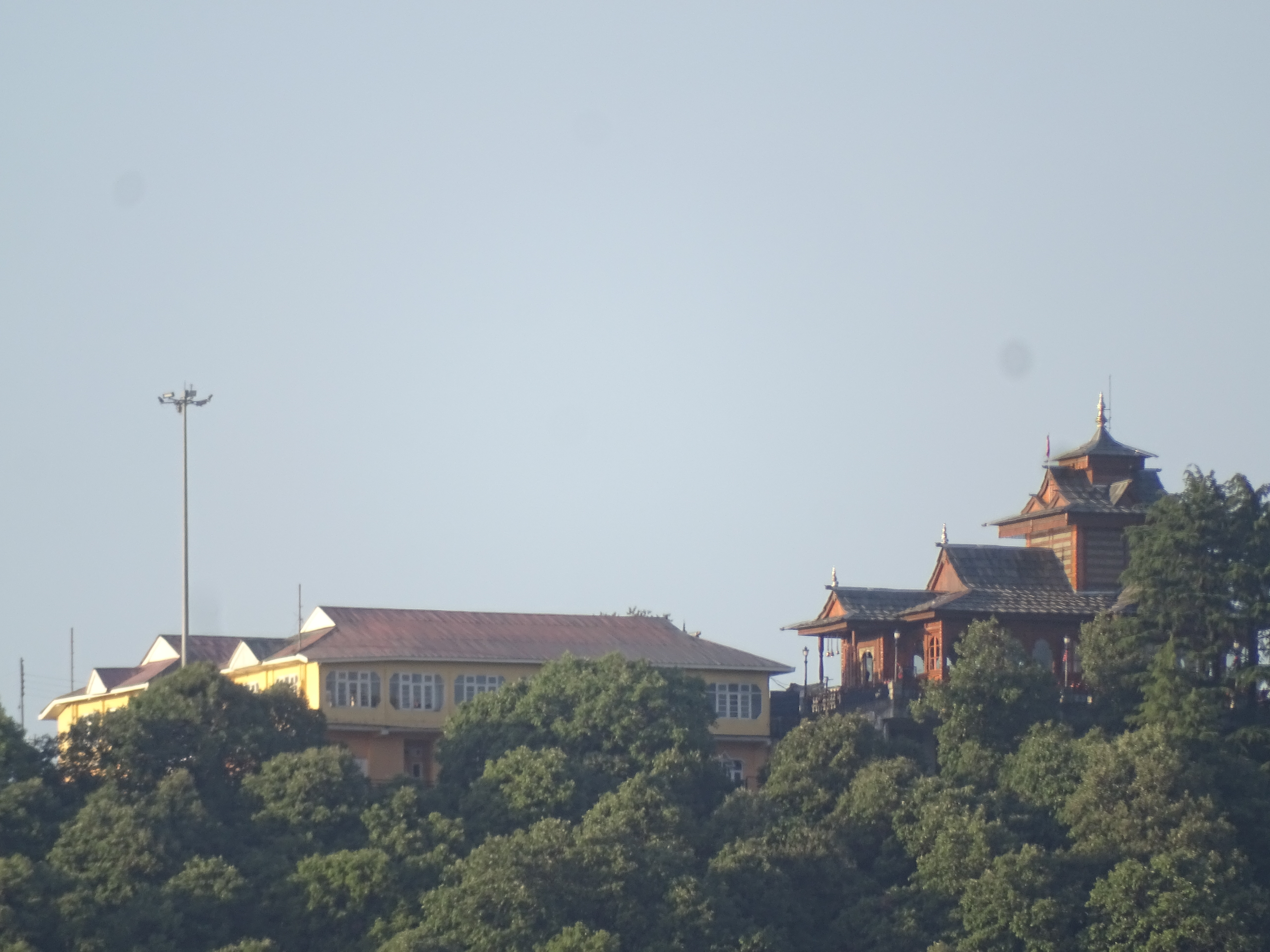
Tara Devi Temple

Tara Devi temple is at a height of 7200 feet above sea level in the Taradevi area atop a ridge, around 7 km away from Shimla city centre.

== History ==
Tara Devi temple was built by Sen dynasty kings sometime around 1766 A.D. The fort of Giri Sen is still there in Junga.

According to a story which traces back to 250 years, the king Bhupendra Sen built the temple and after he had a vision in which Goddess Tara Devi asked him to install a template there so that people could get her blessings. He also installed a wooden statue of Goddess there.

Later, King Balbir Sen had a vision of Goddess Tara where she asked him to install the temple on Tarav hill top. The king did the same and also erected an idol of Goddess made up of "Ashtadhatu", a mix of eight precious elements.The idol was carried on an element named Shankar. It is believed that individuals who visit with unwavering devotion will have their wishes come true.

== The Name Tara ==
Tara Goddess in Hinduism and Buddhism is second of the Ten Great Wisdoms called ‘Mahavidyas’ and is known to be a source of all energies. The word ‘Tara’ is derived from Sanskrit root ‘tr’, which means to cross. The word ‘tara’ also means star in many Indian languages.

== Gallery ==
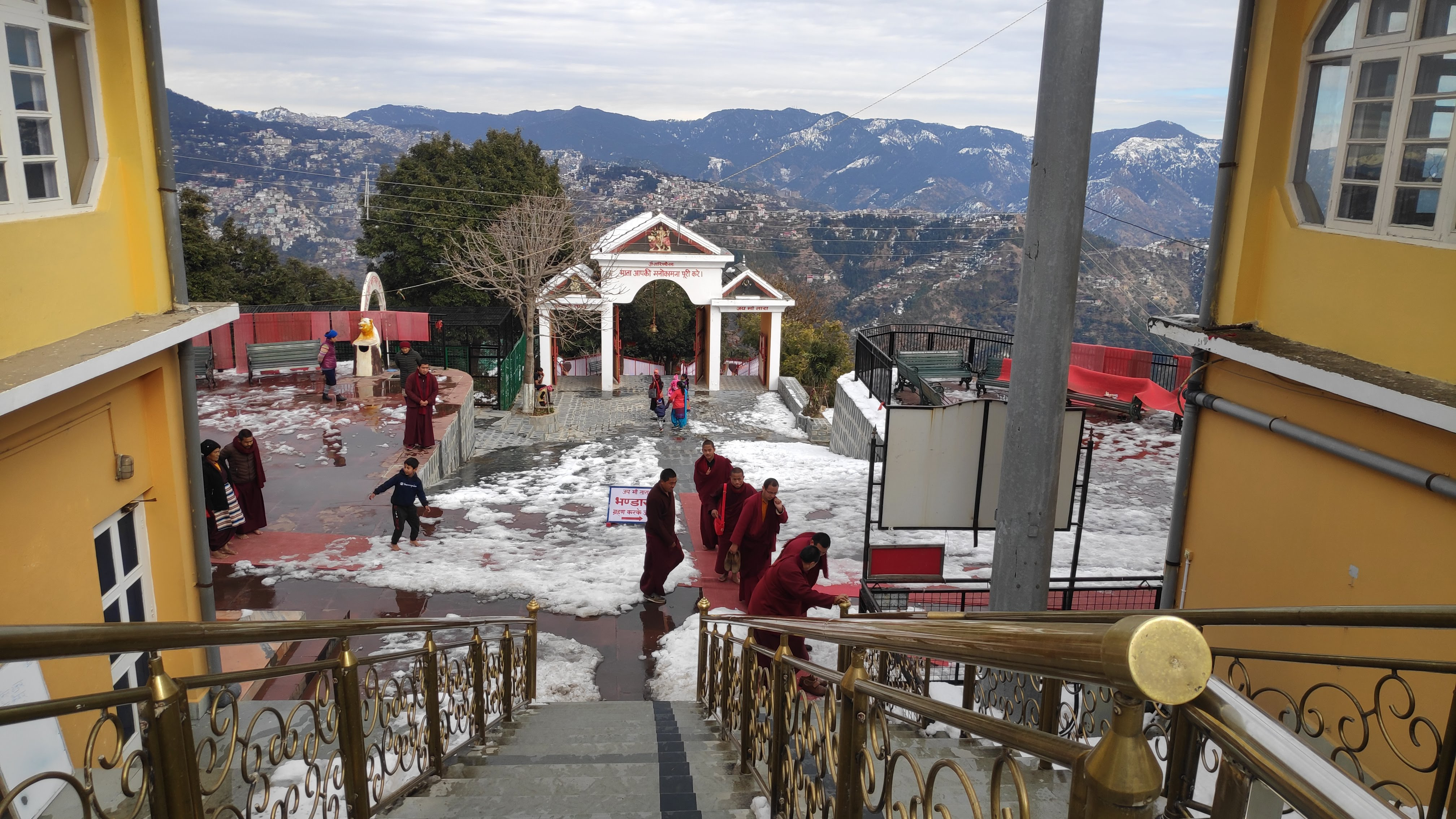
View from inside Tara Devi temple

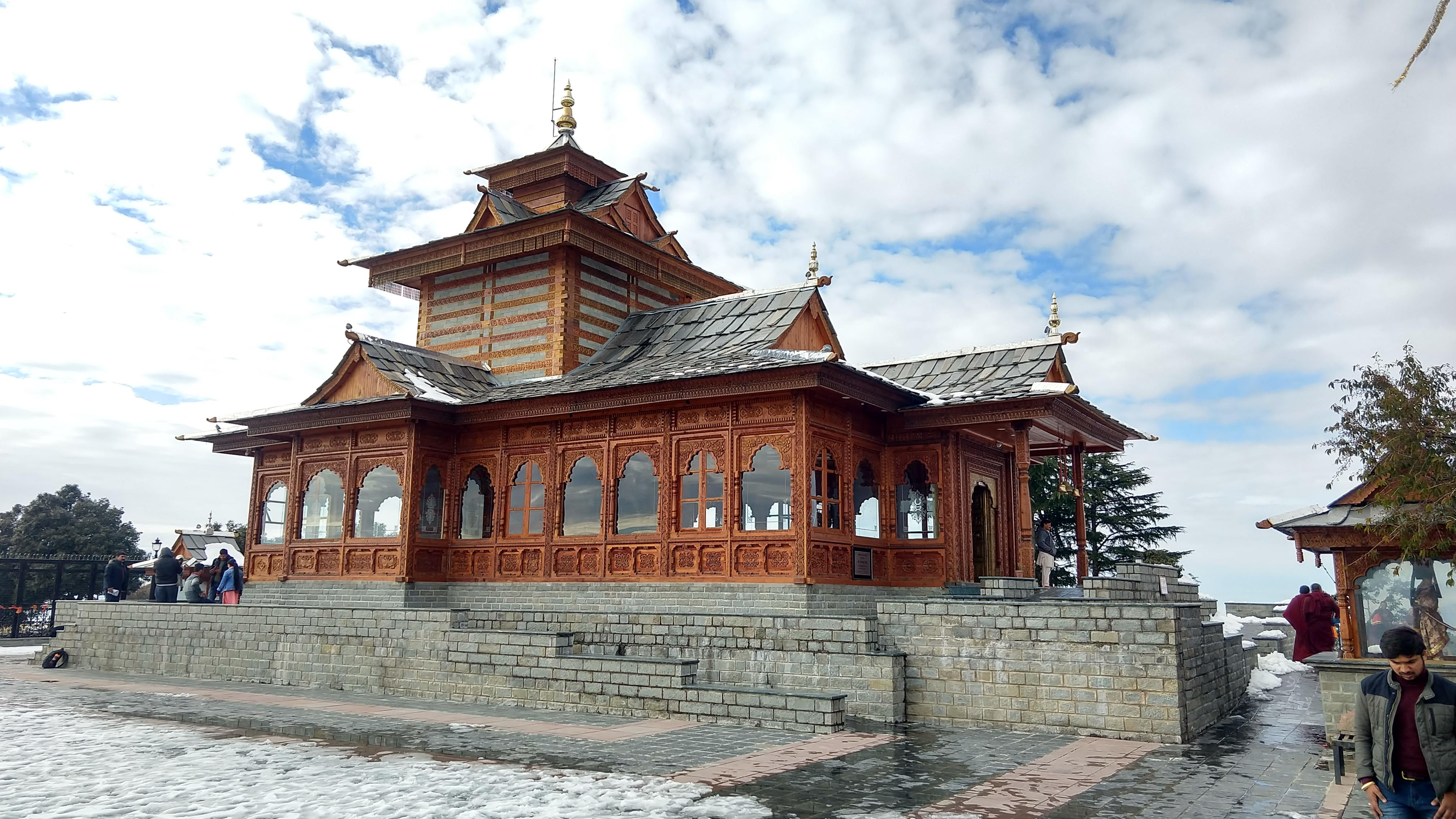
ide view of Tara Devi temple

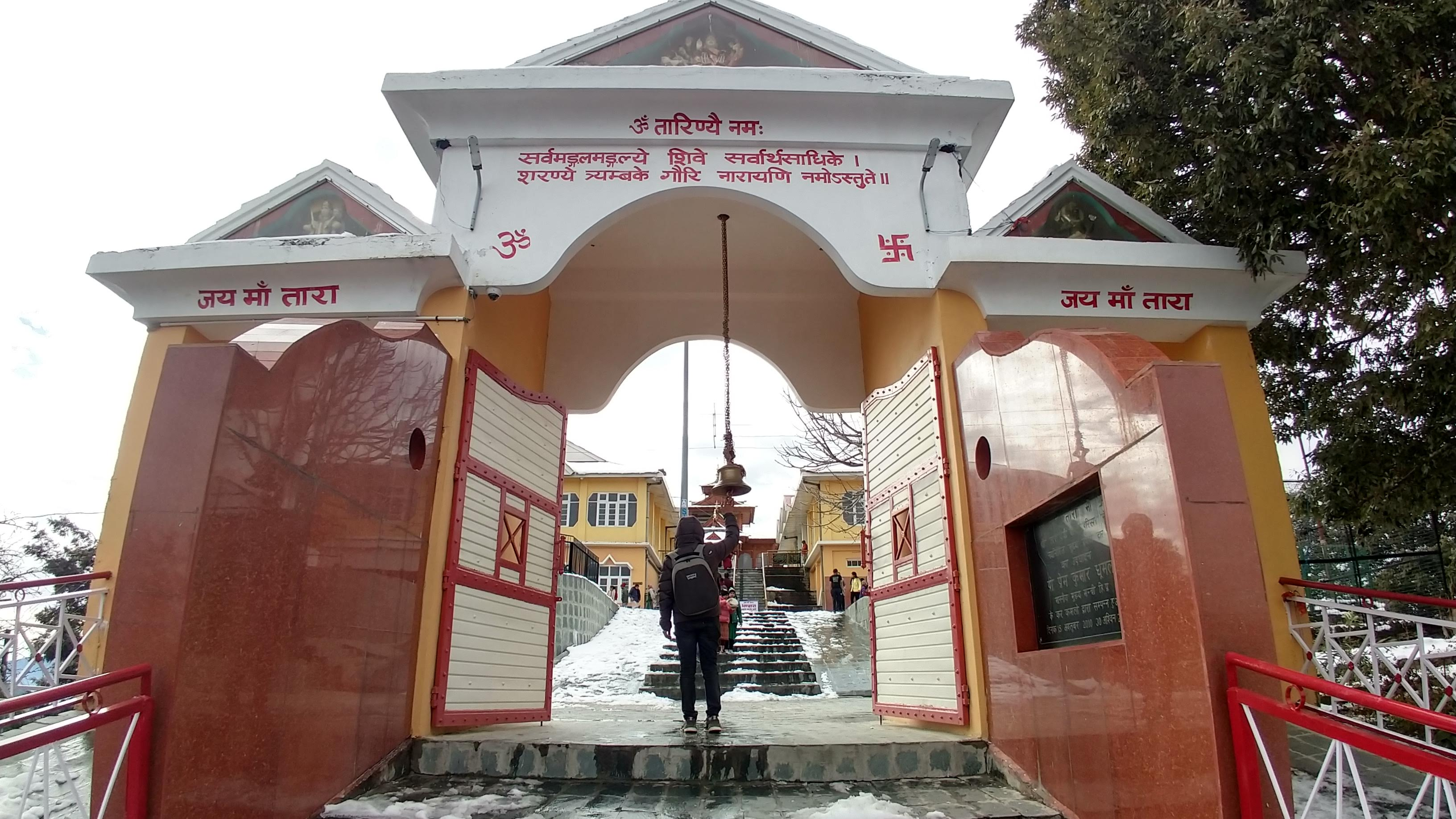
Front gate of Tara Devi temple

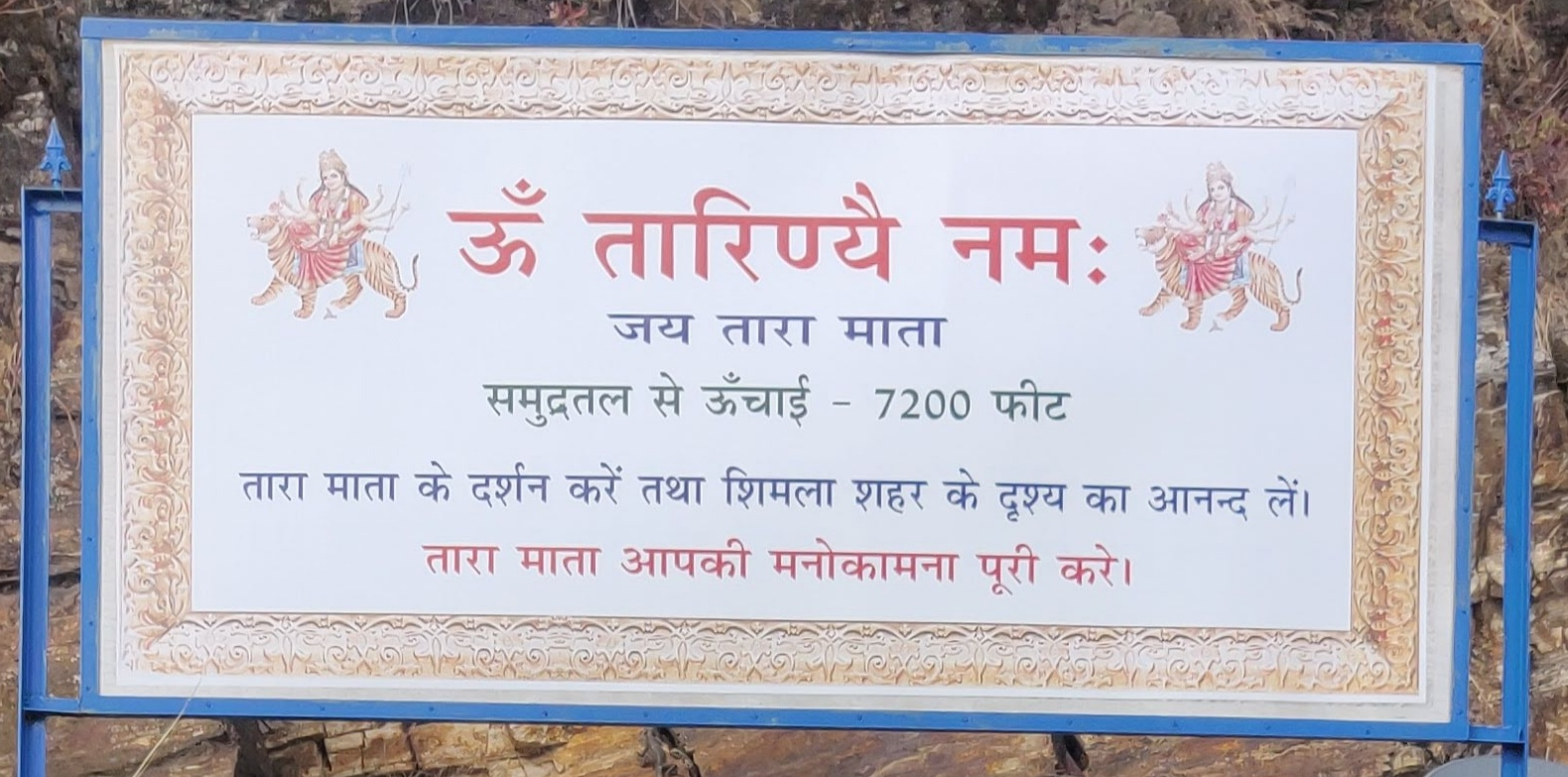
Welcome Board of Tara Devi temple

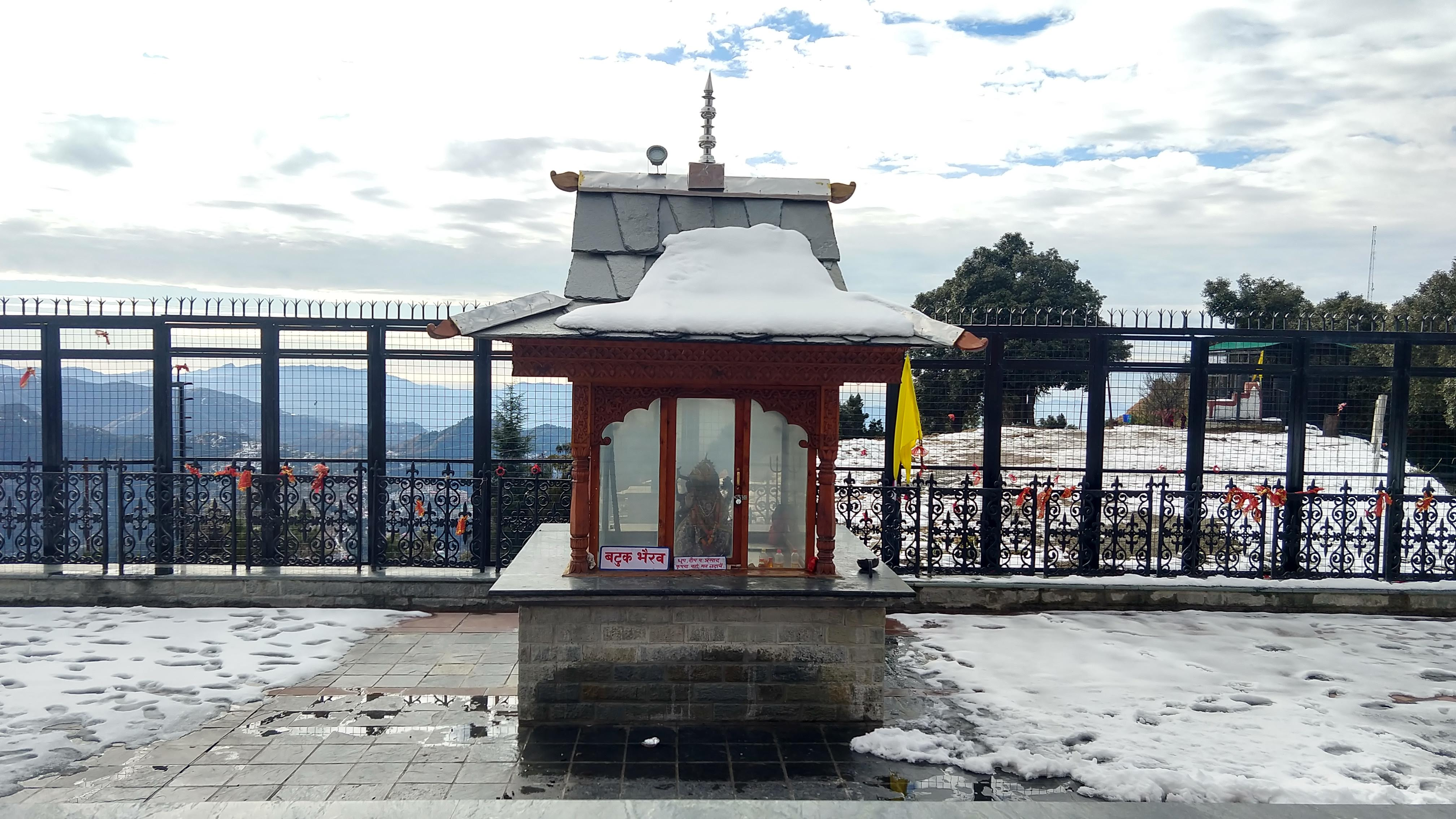
Small Temple of btul bhairav in Tara Devi temple

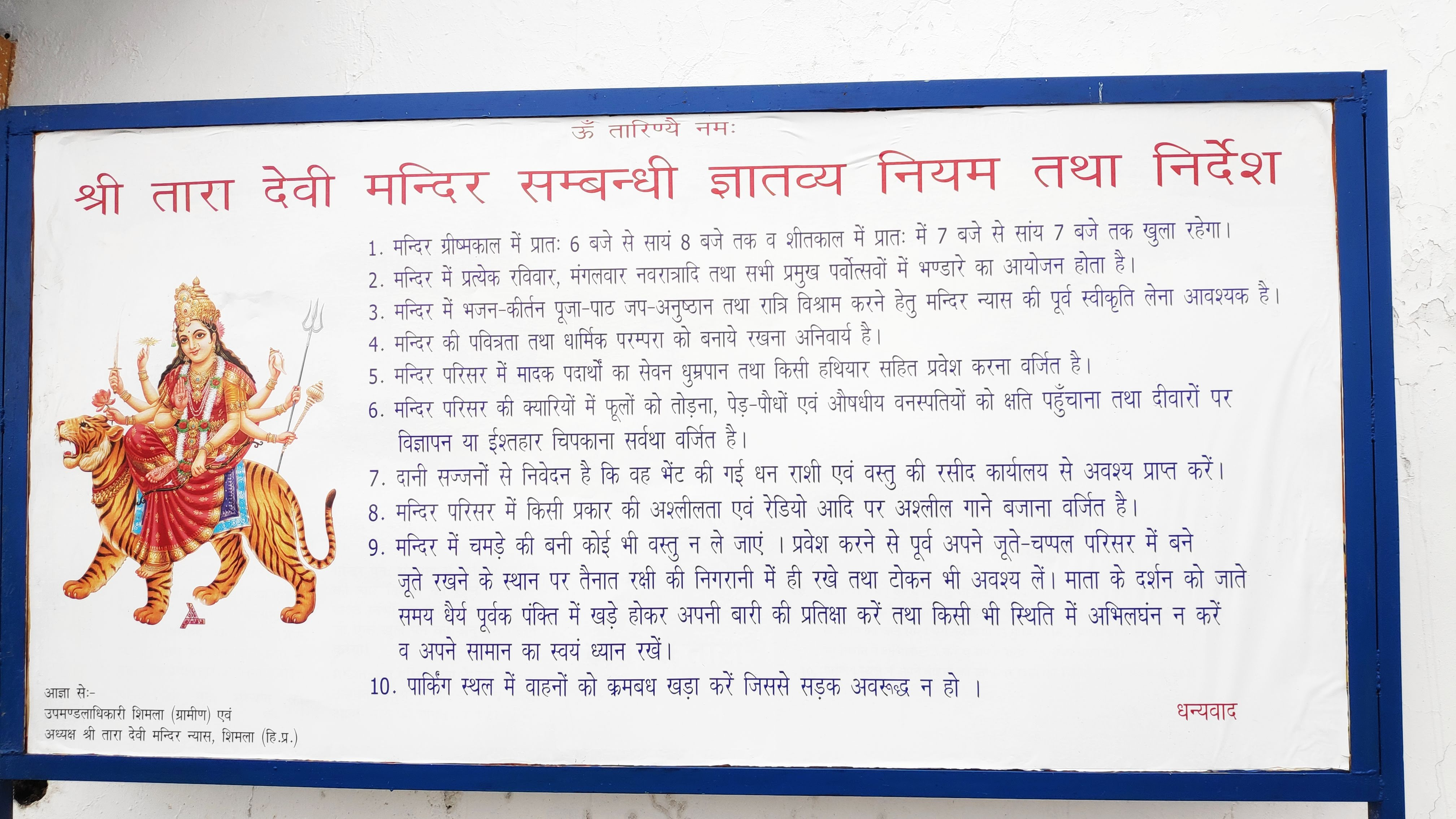
Rules board of Tara Devi temple

== Beliefs ==
It is believed that Goddess Tara was brought to the lap of Himalayas in Himachal from West Bengal in the 18th century. According to some people, being the Goddess of stars, she watches over everyone from the skies and showers her blessings.

== Reconstruction ==
The temple was rebuilt in 2018 after three and a half years of work and at a cost of over ₹6 crore.

== Some other highlights ==
There is a temple of Batuk Bhairav nearby. The milestone gate is 2.5 km away. People who want to organize religious feast wait for 6 years for their turn.

== Visitors Count ==
The temple is open for visit from 7 AM to 6:30 PM on all days. It takes around 2 hours to visit the place. Around 12000 to 15000 devotees visit the temple on weekends and there is no entry fee.
