= Shali Mata Temple =

Hindu temple in Shimla district, Himachal Pradesh

- शाली माता मन्दिर
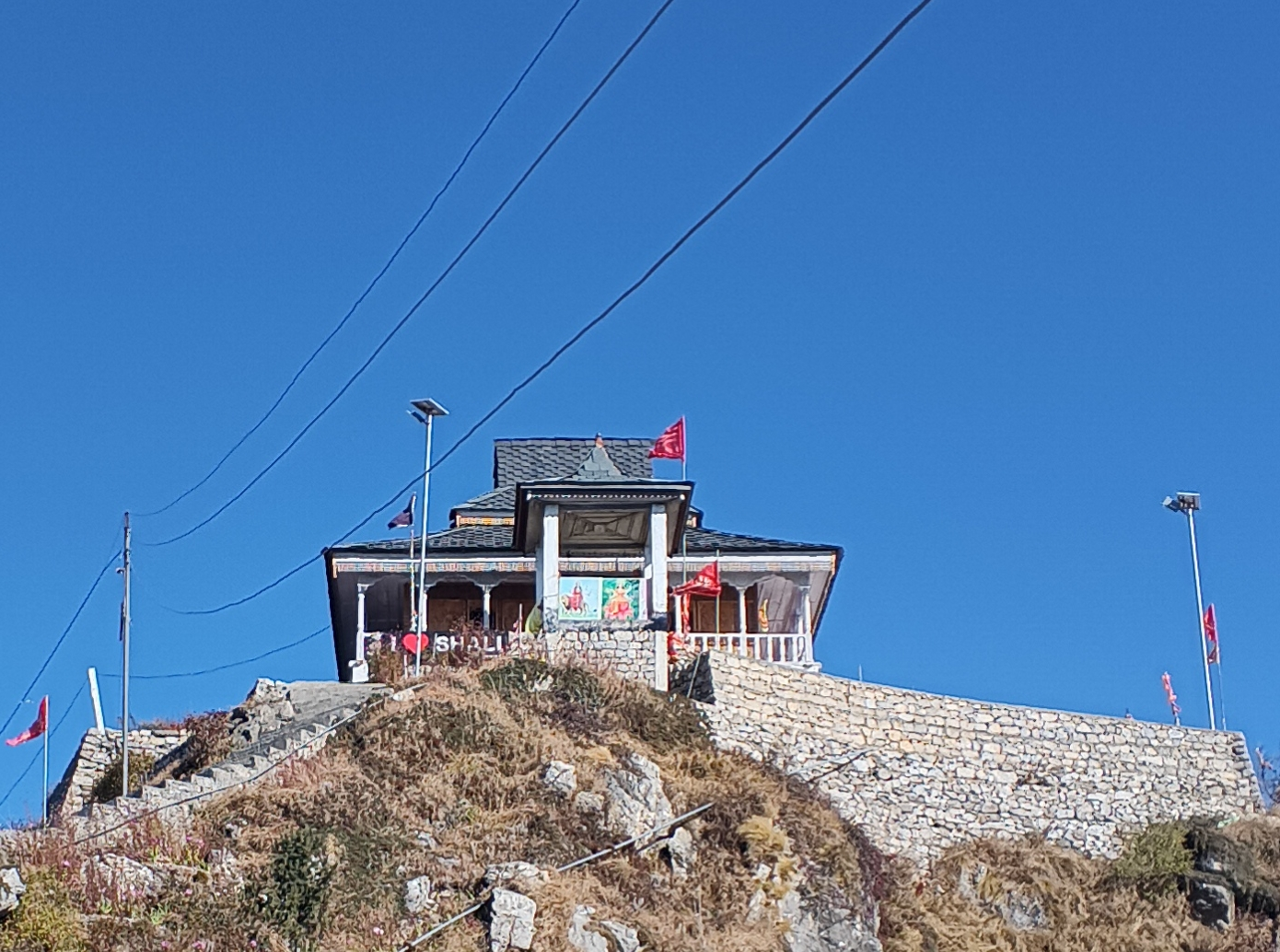
- Shali Mata Temple atop of Shali Tibba peak

- Location in Himachal Pradesh Shali Mata Temple (India)

Religion
- Affiliation: Hinduism
- District: Shimla
- Deity: Bhimakali and Shailaputri
- Festival: Navratri

Location
- Location: Shali Tibba peak, Khatnol
- State: Himachal Pradesh
- Country: India
- Interactive map of Shali Mata Temple
- Coordinates: 31.191433°N 77.274613°E

Architecture
- Style: Kath Kuni
- Creator: Raja Rana Bhupinder Singh of Bushahr (renovated)
- Established: original structure: Ancient (unknown) present structure: early 20th century (renovated)

Specifications
- Elevation: 2,861.7 m (9,389 ft)

Shali Mata Temple is a Hindu temple located on stop of Shali Tibba peak, which rises from Khatnol, which is part of Sunni in Shimla district, Himachal Pradesh, India. The base of the trek in Khatnol is about 36 kilometres (22 mi) from the state capital Shimla. It is about 7 kilometres (4.3 mi) trek from Khatnol to Shali Mata Temple. There is no direct motorable road to the temple.

== History and legends ==
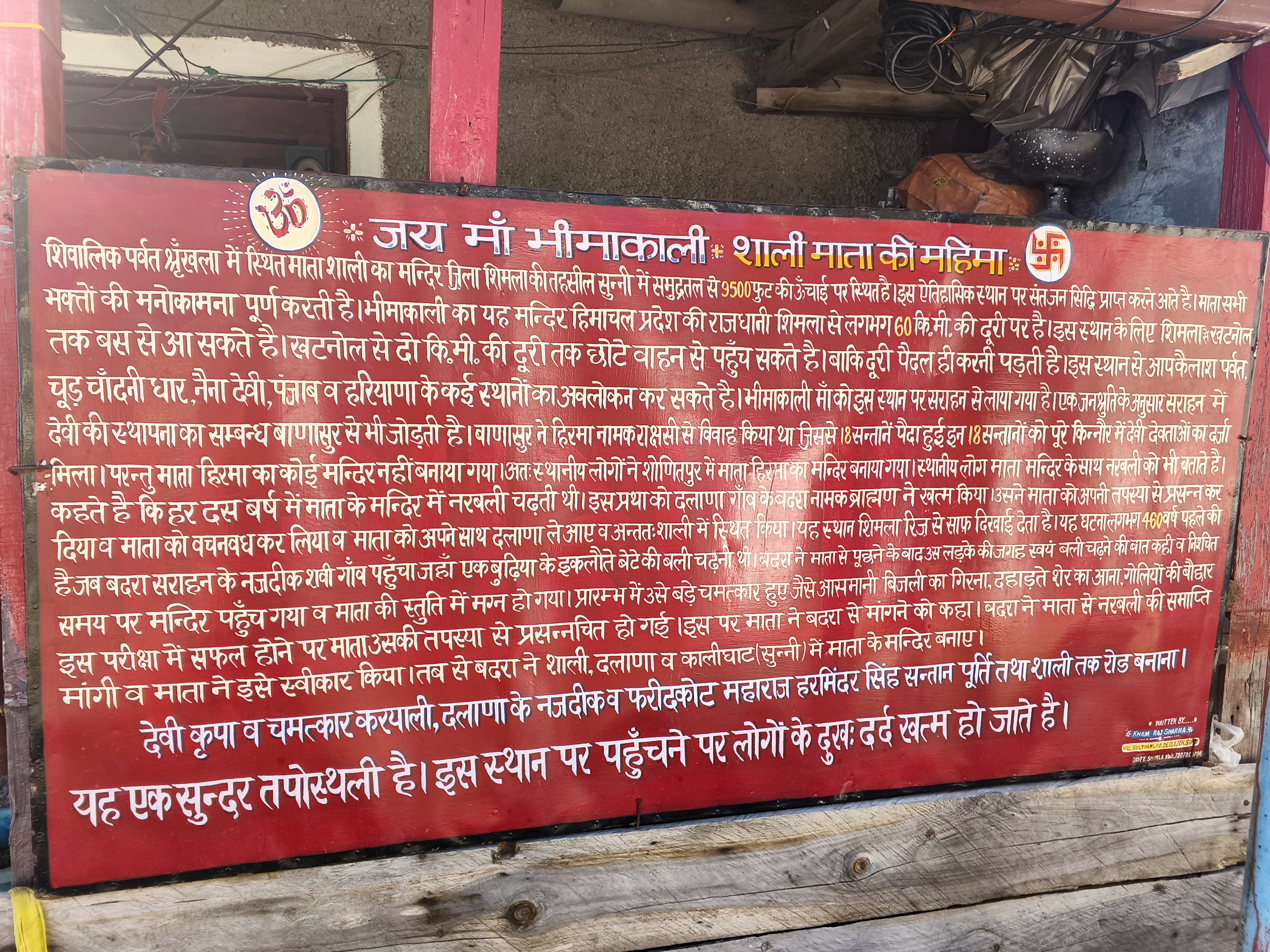
Temple's history and legends written on board inside temple's premises

Many local sources date the history of Shali Mata Temple to over 400 years ago. According to the legend, the original idol of the goddess was first installed in a village named Dalana near Shimla. The idol was reportedly brought there from the shrine of Bhimakali Temple at Sarahan. Later, the devotees believed that the goddess appeared in a dream asking to be moved to the highest peak nearby, so that her blessings could reach far and wide in the region. Responding to this divine command, the idol was relocated and enshrined at the peak of Shali Tibba. Since that time, she came to be worshipped as Shali Mata.

The temple is made in traditional Kath Kuni architecture style.

In earlier times, the trail was in poor condition, and accessibility to the temple was quite difficult, so the then-king of Faridkot state built a trail here in 1936 after his wish of birth of a son was fulfilled. In current times, a pilgrim rest house was built near the temple to accommodate the pilgrims who want to stay overnight.

== Belief ==
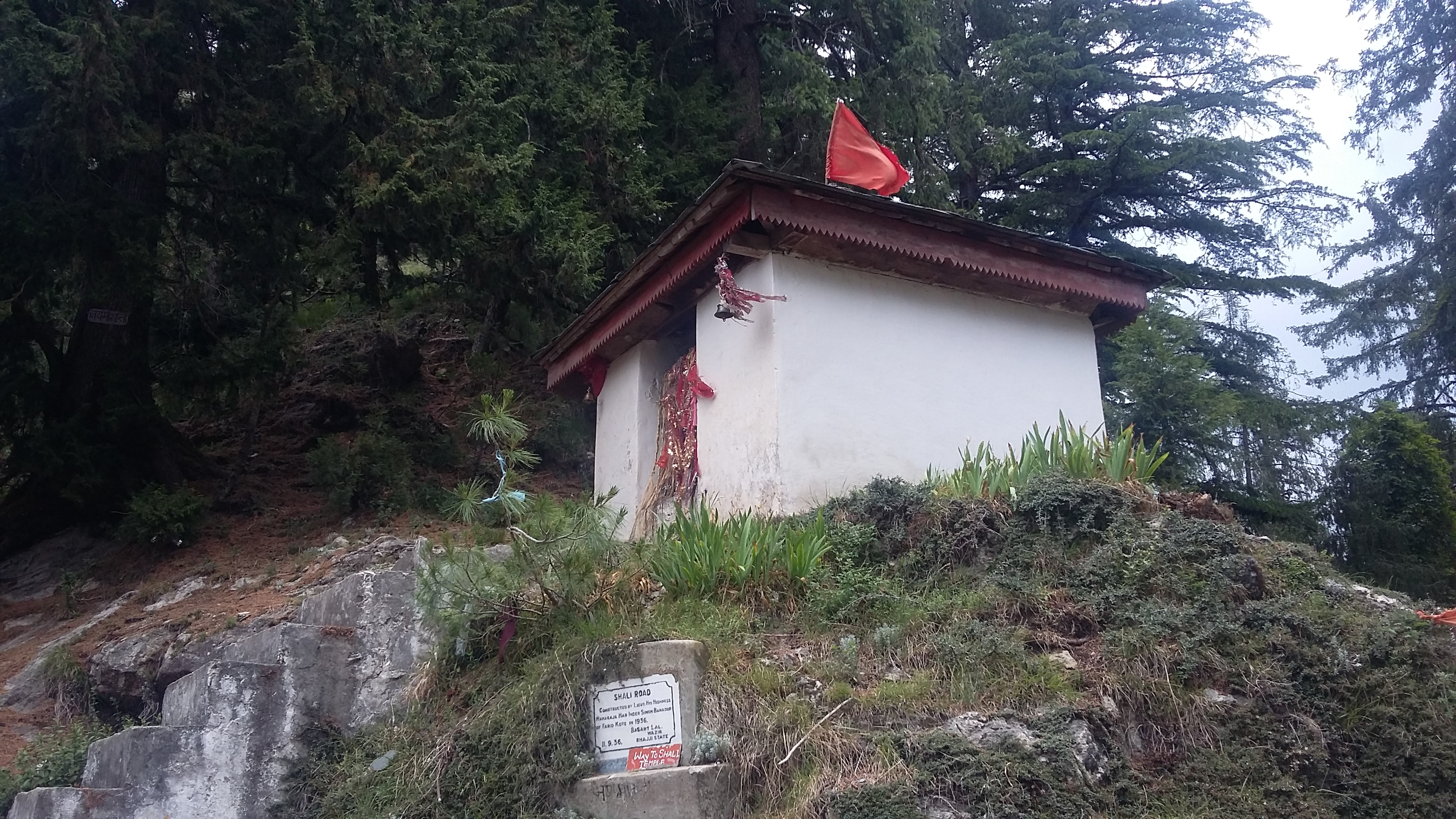
Choti Shali Temple between way (trek) of Shali Mata Temple, atop of Shali Tibba

The temple is popular because of the belief that, whenever the devotees pray to the goddess, she always helps them in any form or by the guidance from their inner self. Devotees believe that, as Rog Nashini (destroyer of diseases), even just a sight of the goddess can cure illnesses and problems, and such ailments fade away even without treatment.

== Geography ==
Shali Mata Temple is situated on the top of Shali Tibba, one of the highest peaks in the Shimla district. In winters, snowfall occurs here in abundance. The temple gives 360-degree panoromic views of the distant high mountain ranges and many peaks, including some of the highest peaks in the country.

=== Views of distant Himalayan peaks and ranges ===
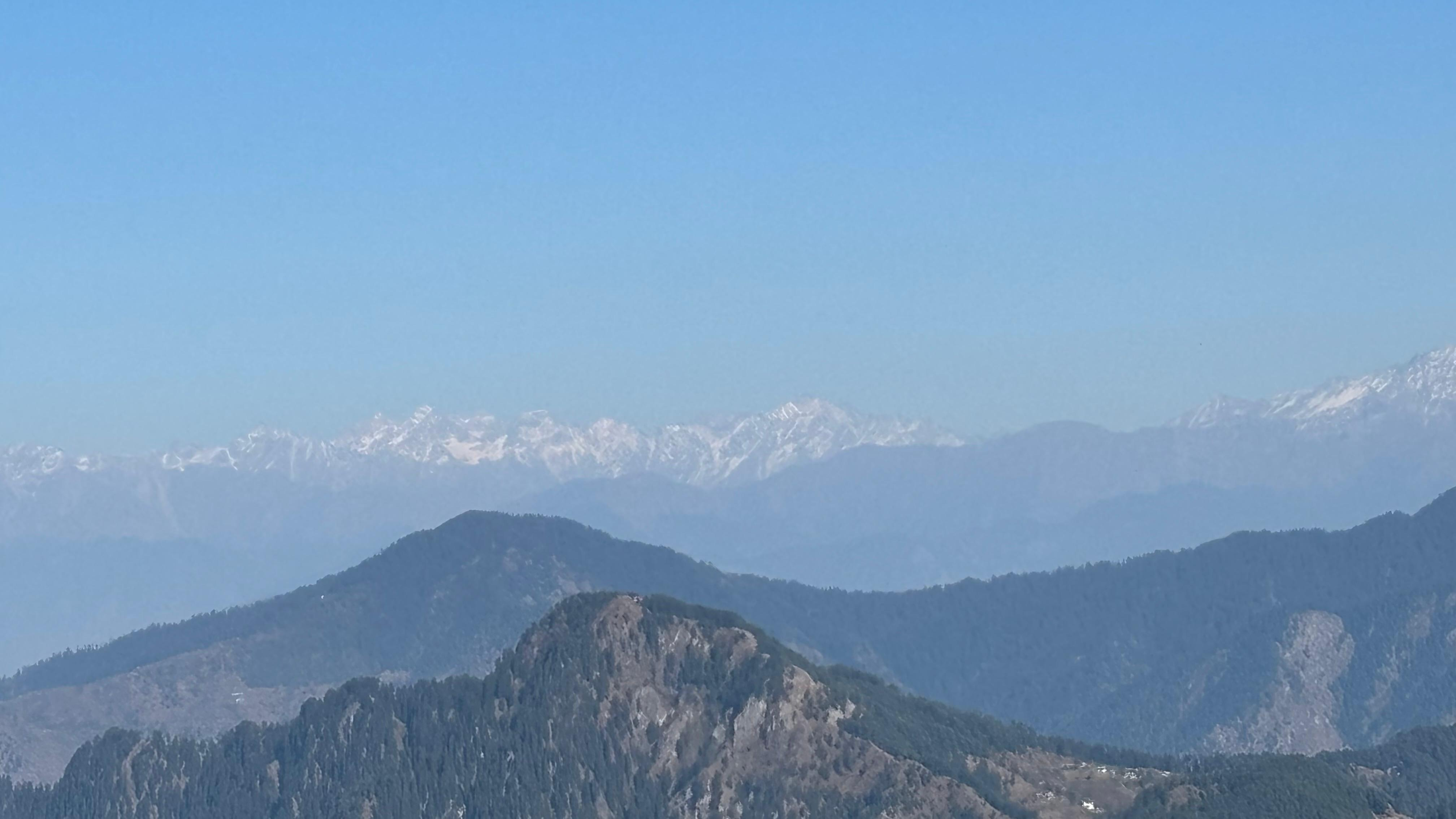
Dhauladhars seen from the Shali Mata Temple

Peaks from Kangra-Chamba side: The Manimahesh Kailash, Hanuman Tibba (highest peak of Dhauladhar range), and other high peaks of Dhauladhar range

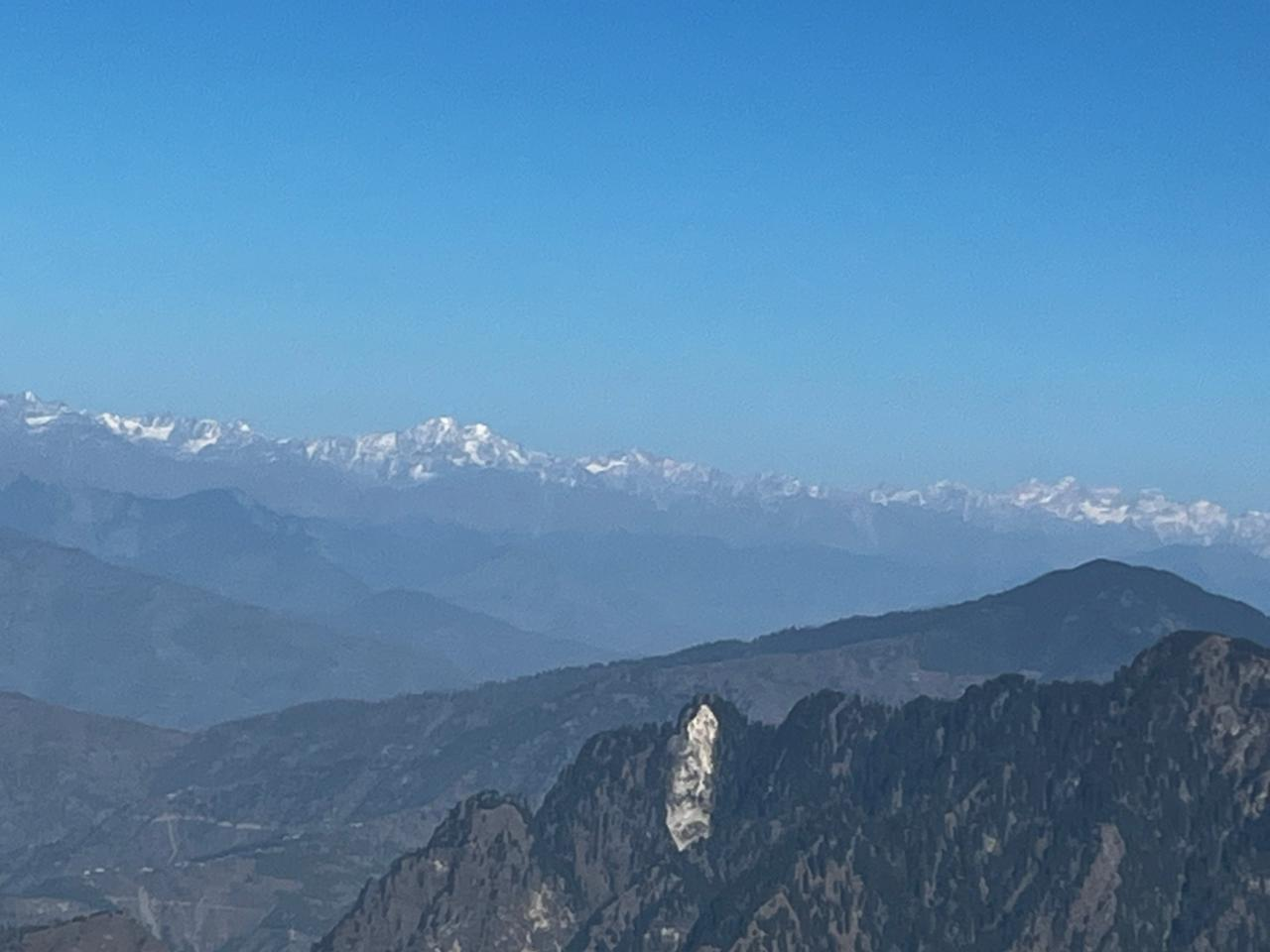
Kullu and Kinnaur Himalayas as seen from the temple

Peaks from Kullu side: Deo Tibba, Parvati Parvat, the highest peak of Pir Panjal range which is Indrasan, etc

Peaks from the Kinnaur-Shimla side Himalayan ranges: Himachal Pradesh's highest peak Reo Purgyil in Kinnaur district can be seen from the temple. Two other Kailashas are also visible apart from the Manimahesh Kailash: Shrikhand Mahadev and Kinnaur Kailash. Other peaks of the region which are visible from here are Mul Mahunaag, Shikari Peak, Kali Tibba, Gushu-Pishu, Hansbeshan Peak, Krunshikring Peak, Churdhar Peak, and other ranges near Chaupal and Sirmaur. Other Himalayan ranges and forested hills of Shimla such as Jakhu hill, Kufri, Theog, Fagu, and Narkanda can also be seen.

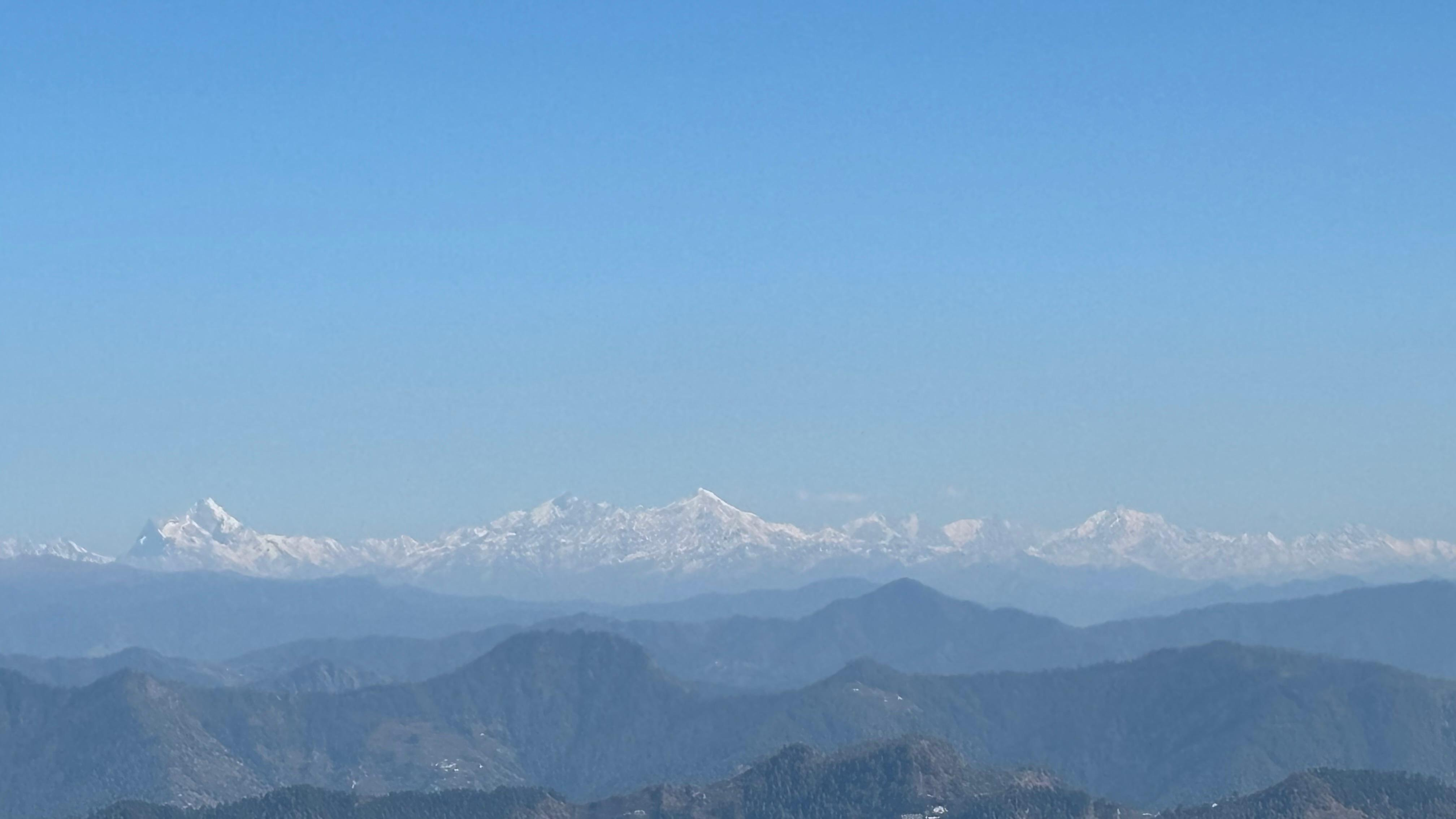
Garhwal Himalayas as seen from the temple

Peaks from the Garhwal Himalayas: On clear days, distant peaks from beyond Himachal Pradesh, including Bandarpunch, Swargarohini, Kalanag, Kedarnath, Satopanth, Yamunotri, and parts of Gangotri.

=== Views of valleys and rivers ===
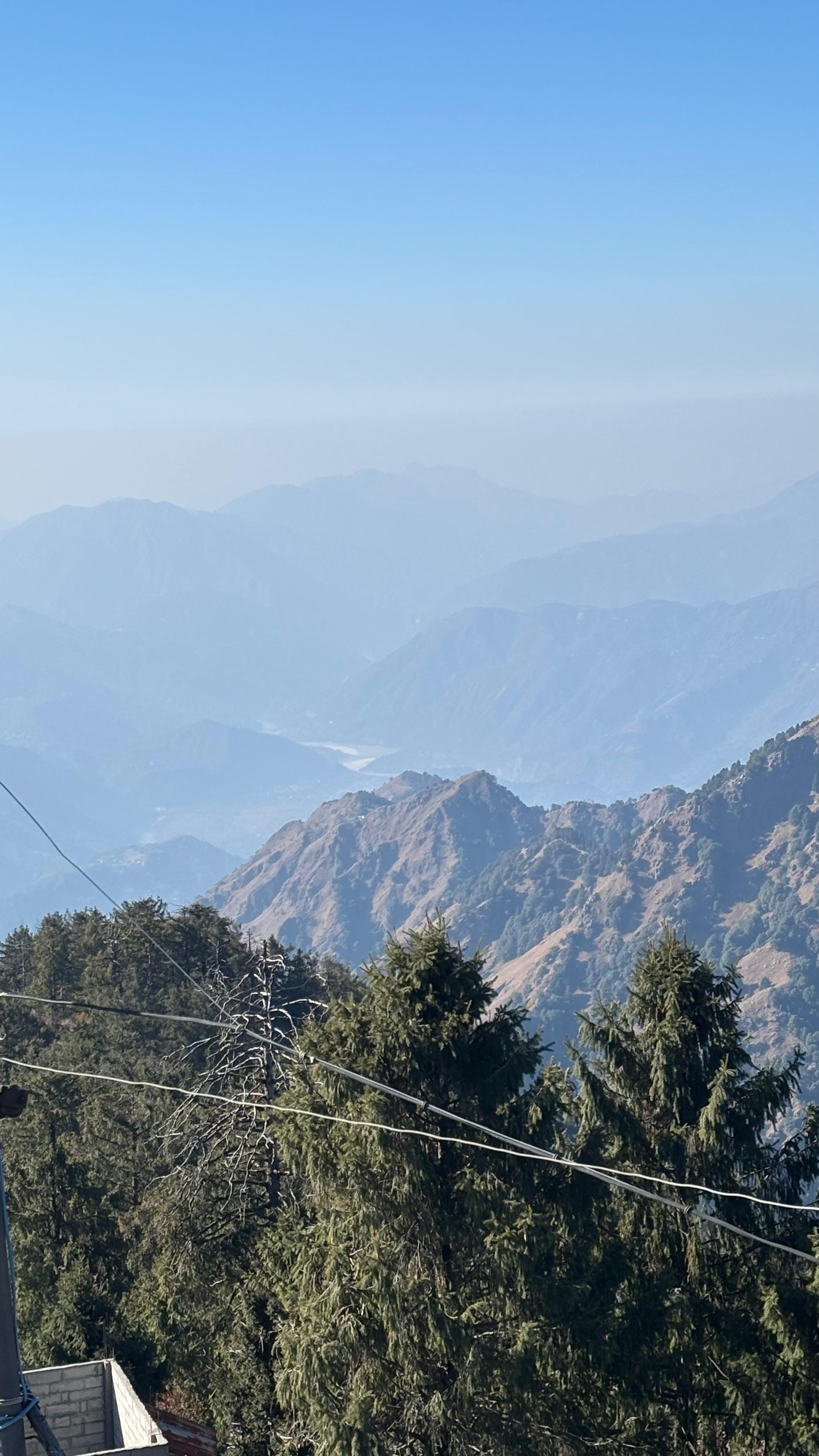
Satluj river as seen flowing in Tattapani in Sunni valley

Many valleys of the state are visible from the temple and peak, including Sunni valley, Satluj valley, and Kangra valley. Satluj river can be seen flowing in Sunni valley in Tattapani from the temple premises.

=== Views of different places ===
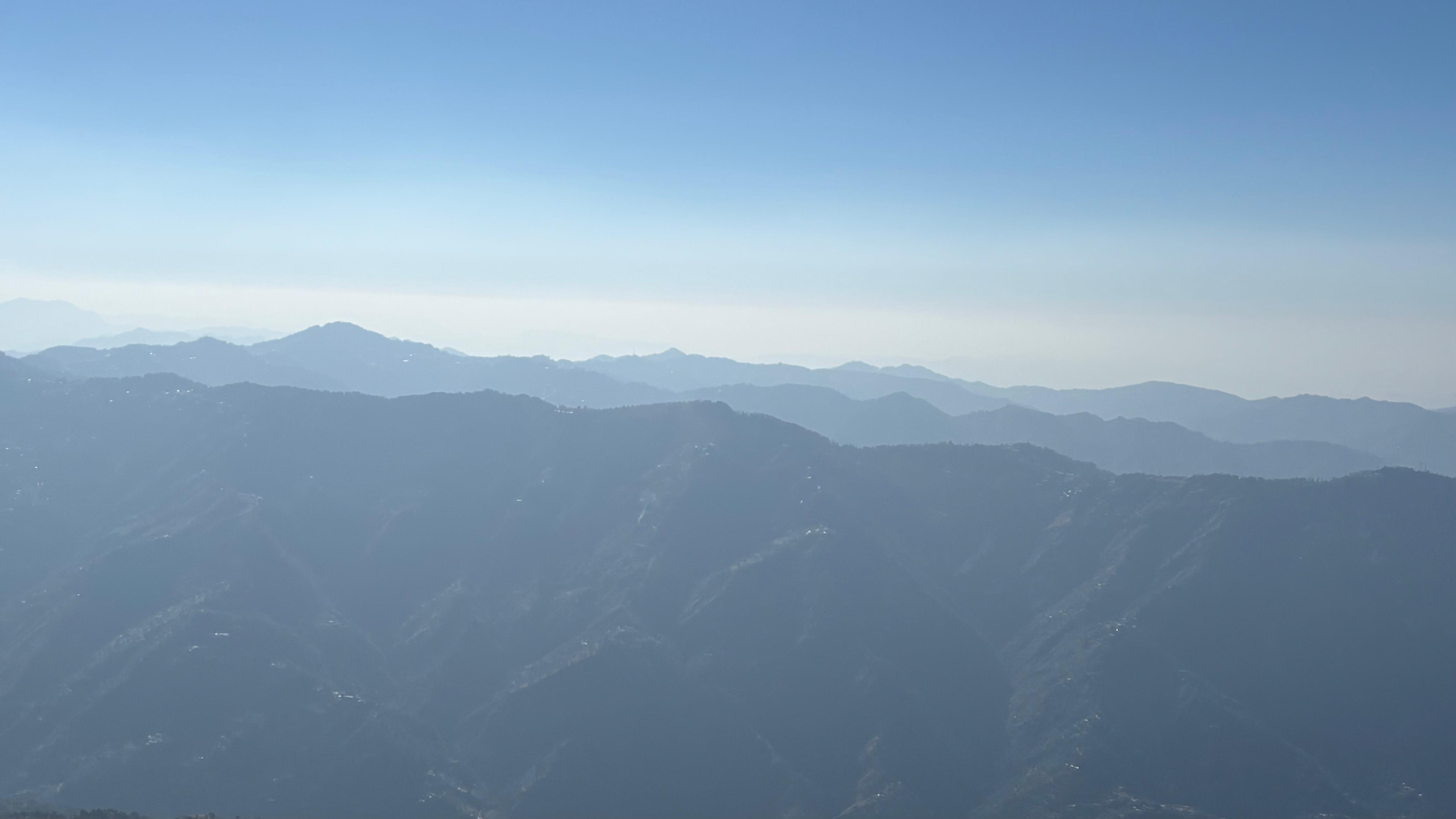
Shimla, Kasauli and Solan hills are clearly visible from the temple

Many places like the state's capital Shimla as well as Kasauli, Solan, Karol Tibba, Parwanoo, and other nearby towns can be seen from the temple premises.

=== Views of Northern plains ===
The Punjab and Haryana plains are also visible from the temple, but it is very hard to view the actual Punjab plains because it is much farther from the temple, which is in interior Himachal Pradesh. Plains can be visible, but only with very clear weather, which is harder in current times, as the smog and fog covers the environment over plains much stronger than that in the hilly areas.

== Accessibility ==
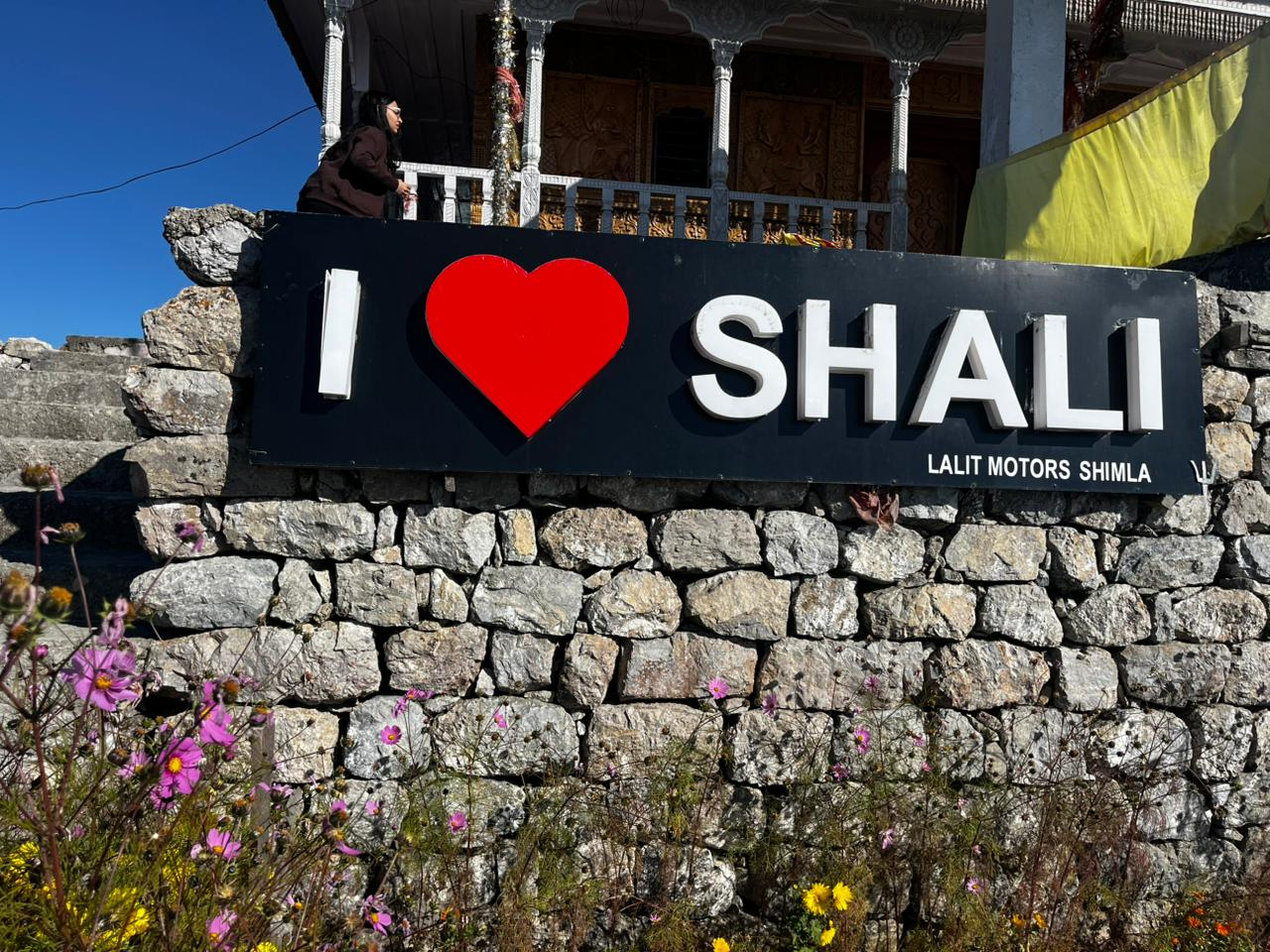
I Love Shali written on board in front of the temple

Accessibility to Shali Mata Temple involves a combination of road travel and a short mountain trek. From Shimla, the base of the trek in Khatnol is about 36 kilometres (22 mi) through motorable road byMashobra and Baldeyan up to Khatnol, which is the last road-accessible point below the Shaki Tibba peak. From Khatnol (the base), there is moderate steep trek of about 7 kilometres (4.3 mi) to the top of the peak where the temple is situated, that passes through dense Deodar and Pine forests. The path is well-marked by locals, making it safe and popular for the pilgrims. In clear weather, the trek is properly maintained, but during snowfall or monsoon, the trail sometimes become slippery and more challenging, which then requires proper caution.
