= Karsog =

Karsog Karsog Valley Chakranagri
- Town
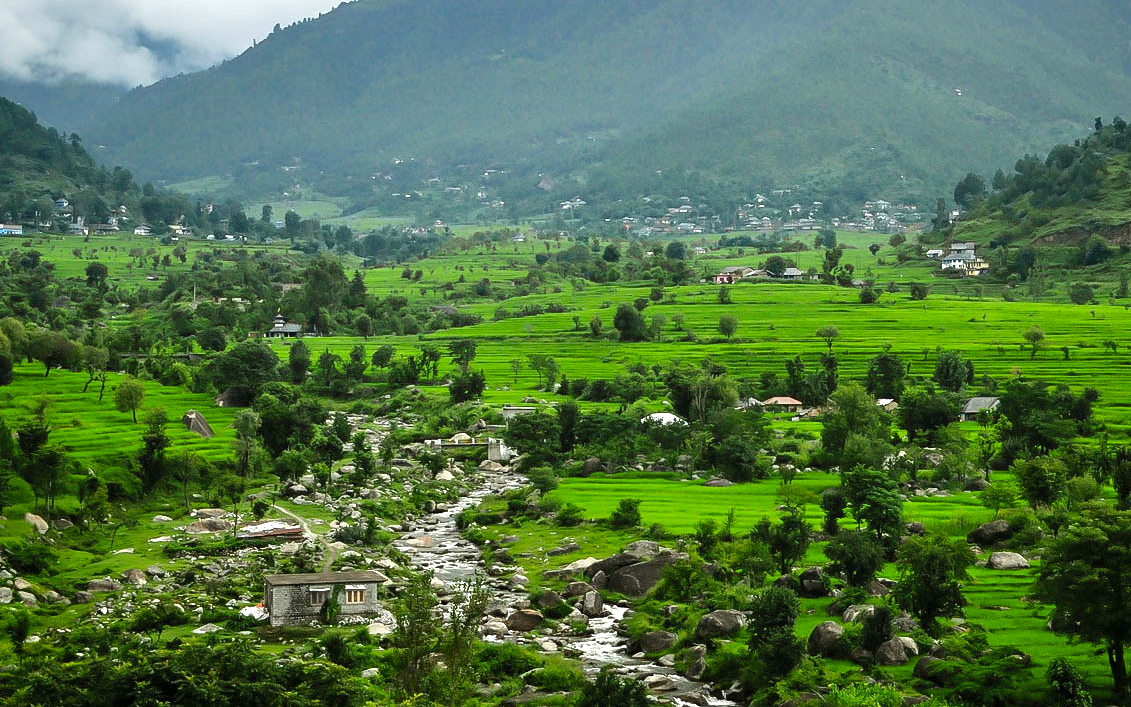
- Karsog
- Nickname: k town
- Location in Himachal Pradesh, India Karsog (India)
- Coordinates: 31.3835°N 77.2028°E
- Country: India
- State: Himachal Pradesh
- District: Mandi

Government
  - Type: Federal Republic
  - Body: Government of Himachal Pradesh
  - MLA: Sh.Deep Raj

Area
  - Total: 524 km^{2} (202 sq mi)

Population
  - Total: 93,126
  - Density: 178/km^{2} (460/sq mi)

Languages
  - Official: English, Hindi
- Time zone: UTC+5:30 (IST)
- PIN: 175011
- Telephone code: 01907
- Vehicle registration: HP 30

Karsog is a town and municipal area (Nagar Panchayat) in the state of Himachal Pradesh in northern India.

== Folklore ==
According to local folklore, the Pandavas spent their Vanvas here. There are many stories about them and many temples said to be built by them.

=== History of Shikari devi ===
According to the related stories, many years ago hunters worshiped a goddess on the mountain and prayed to get success in their hunt. The temple was built by the Pandavas and they stayed there at that period of time. People in the valley say that during heavy snowfall, you can see snow everywhere in the valley but not on the top of the temple.

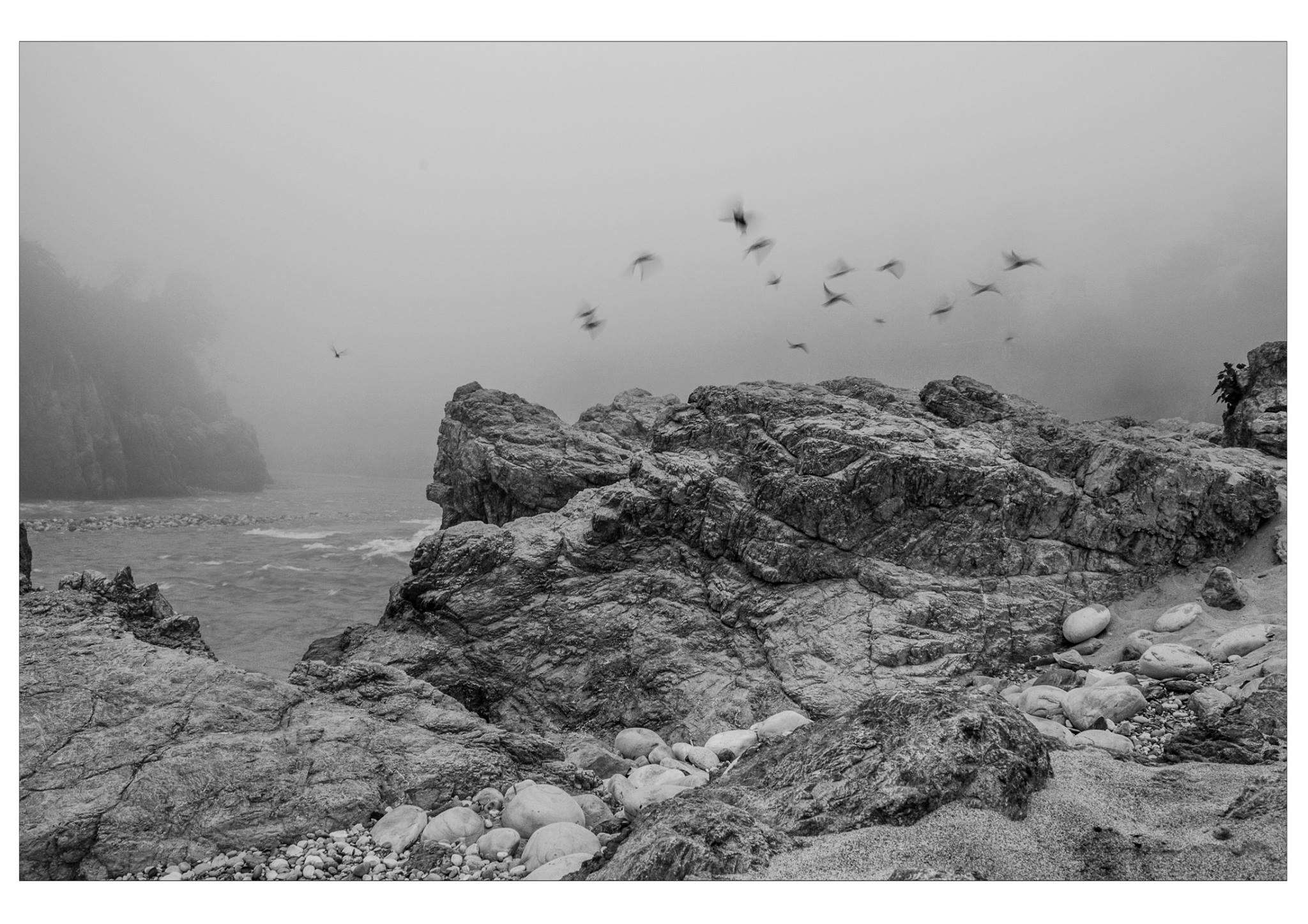
Foggy morning at Tattapani

Tattapani is known for its hot springs and is about 52 km from Shimla on the way to Karsog valley. This place is also a famous tourist spot, with a view of Satluj River flowing through the mountains.

== Geography ==
The total area of Karsog is 524 km^{2}. Karsog has a population of 93,126 people. The geographical position of Karsog is 31.3813° N, 77.2046° E.

Karsog is a town in Karsog sub-division of Mandi District in Himachal Pradesh State in India. Distance of Karsog from various places:

- Mandi-Karsog = 125 km
- Shimla-Karsog = 108 km
- Karsog-Pangna = 25 km
- Karsog-Kelodhar = 14 km
- Karsog-Seri Banglow = 19 km
- Karsog-Churag = 18 km
- Karsog-Sorta = 18 km
- Karsog-Kamaksha = 07 km
- Karsog-Bag Salana = 03 km
- Karsog-Bhurti = 19 km
- Karsog-Mahunag = 34 km
- Karsog-Mumail = 2 km
- Karsog-Chamba = 391 km
- Karsog-Kinnaur = 208 km
- Karsog-Kullu = 183 km
- Karsog-Solan = 153 km
- Karsog-Leh = 681 km
- Karsog-Gholog = 5 km

== Weather ==
The climate remains mild most of the time during the year. Due to cold weather in the 7–8 months in the year dhatus, shawls and woolen jackets are the main clothing of most of people in the valley.

Located in the Himalayas, Karsog goes through vast drought seasons during the winter and is burdened by flooding and hail every spring. March, June, September, and November, are usually cool and dry.

== Agriculture ==
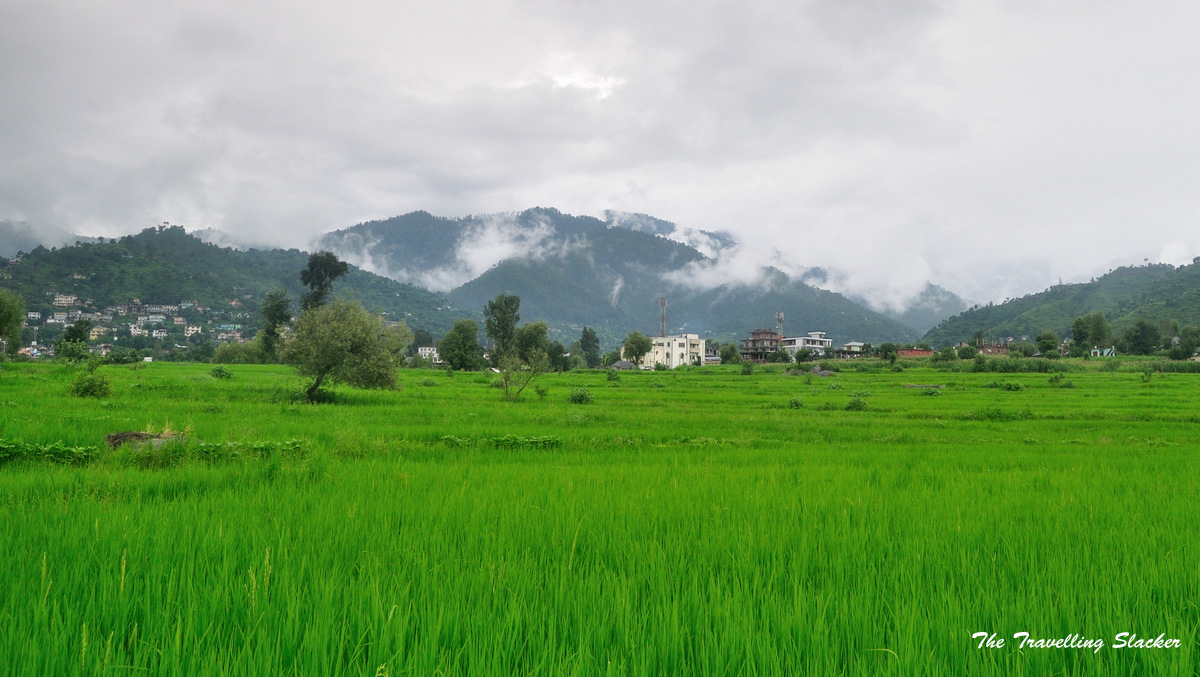
Karsog Valley Agriculture Farms Himachal Pradesh India

Karsog is land of farmers, a variety of crops are grown up there and land is very fertile. Apples, wheat, Rajma, corn, pomegranates, rice, potato, peas and vegetables are the main crops. Apple growing is the main source of income for many people in the valley. Recently new apple cultivars like jeromine, redvelox, gala, adom, and other vegetables like celery, broccoli, and red capsicum have been introduced.

== Languages ==
Pahari and Hindi are widely spoken languages in the region.

== Education ==
Karsog Town has many institutions that offer education to local students, including Govt post-graduate College, industrial training institute (for vocational courses), BEd. College. G.S.S.S Karsog, SVM Karsog, Root Model Public school, B.L. Central School and Day star school.

== Government departments located in Karsog ==
- Education Department - There is a senior secondary school, a college and a middle school. They have been authorized by government. There are a number of schools which are run by the people of Karsog.
- Forest Department
- Law Department
- Police Station - There is one police station in Karsog.
- Municipal Department - Karsog is run by a nagar panchayat. There are talks of running Karsog through a municipal corporation.
- BSNL - The telephone exchange of Karsog is in Baral. It is about one kilometre from the main bus stand.
- Transport Department(HRTC depot Karsog)
- Hospitals
- Tourism Department - Karsog valley is famous for its climate, mountains, hills, and temples. The Mamleshwar Resort in Chindi is about 15 kilometres from Karsog.
- Agricultural department
- Block Development Office
- Banking - There are four public-sector and two state co-operative banks.
- Post Office - An Indian Post Office is located near Bus Stand Karsog.
- Jal shakti vibhag karsog (irrigation cum public health dept.)

== Cultural significance ==
The area is of historical significance to Hinduism because of its many temples. The name Karsog is believed to have derived from a myth in the Mahābhārata, Which tells the story of a town being terrorized by a cannibal Rakshasa. This led to the name Karsog as an amalgamation of the Hindi words 'Kar' and 'Shok', Creating a word that loosely translates to 'Daily Mourning'.

== Tourism ==
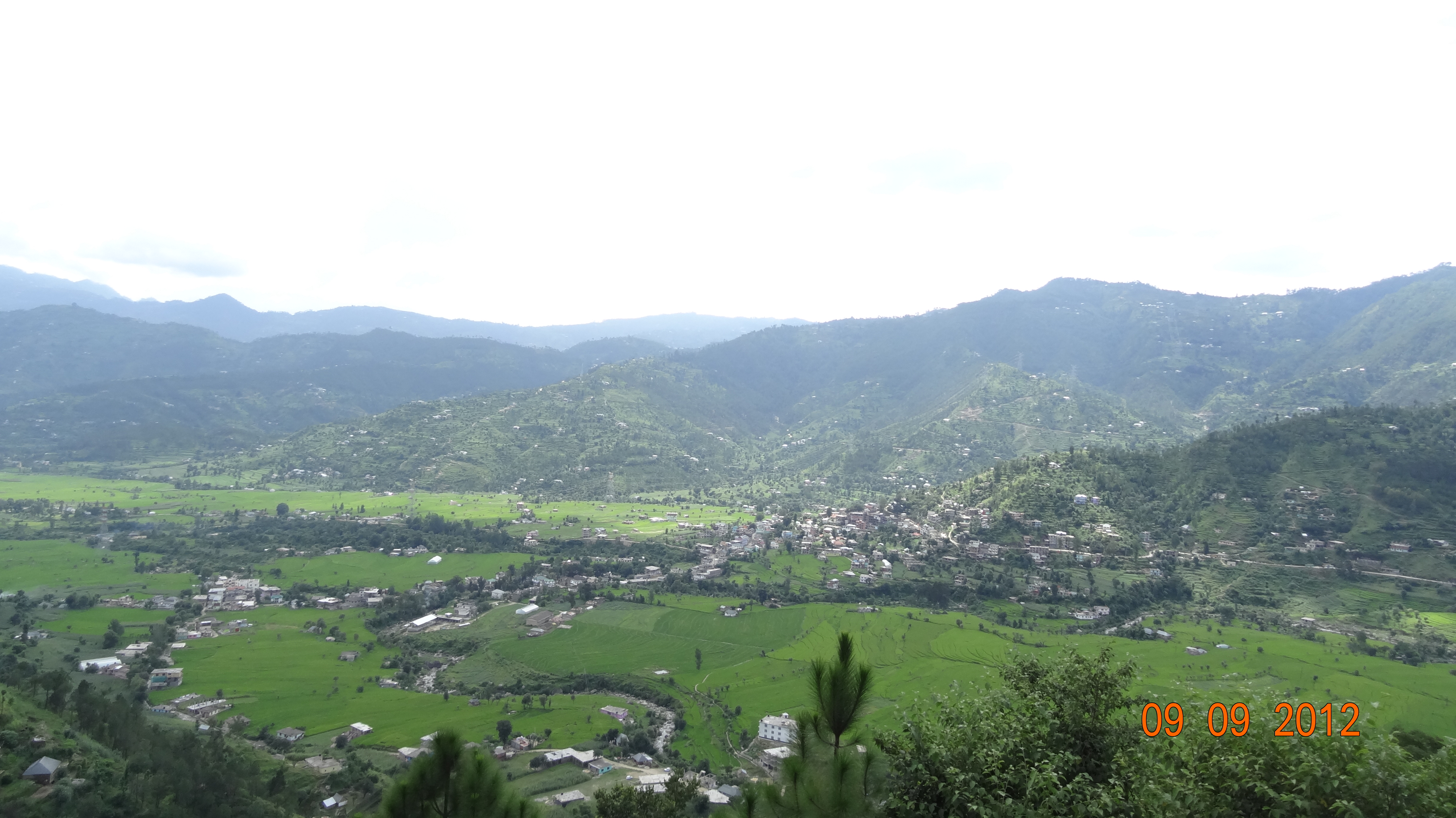
Karsog town

Karsog is famous for its temples, including the Mamleshwar Mahadev, Kamaksha Devi, MahunNag, Someshwar Mahadev, Tebbani Mahadev, Somakothi temple, Chowasigarh, Dhamun Tibba.

Accessible from the state capital Shimla, the tracks around Karsog and Chindi contain wide valleys, crisscrossed by streams and carpeted with fields of assorted vegetables and grain. From fertile floors, orchards and thick forests rise to touch snow-covered peaks.

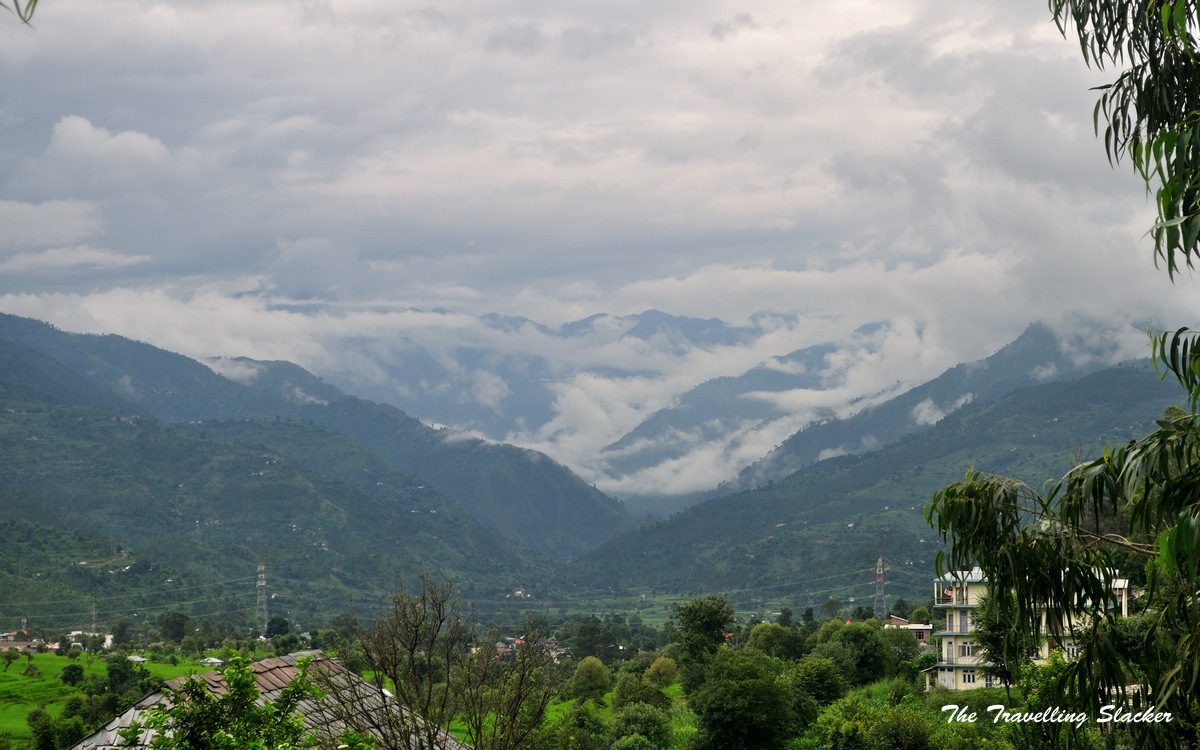
Karsog Valley (3)

Named after the local deity, Chandika (Chindi) Mata, the tiny village of Chindi rests along a highway that services Shimla, Karsog and Mandi. A little further ahead, at the village of Bakhrot is the bifurcation to Kullu and Manali along a less traveled route.

From the hotel at Chindi, the rise of Kunho Dhar is accessed through the Karsog market. This large flat hilltop presents a 360 degrees view of the area. The Karsog valley lies below, to the north is the peak of Shikari Devi. Some of the other well-known ranges and mountains visible from Kunhoo Dhar are the Pir Panjal, the Dhamun Tibba, the rises around the Jalori Pass, the Chawasi Tibba, Narkanda's Hattu Peak and the Shali Tibba. The villages of Churag, Chindi, and Mahunag form a part of the foreground and the other sightseeing places of Dhamoon and Seri Bangla ( Bungalow ) are also visible. Kunhoo Dhar has a large pond and big ground while a low rise holds the small temple dedicated to both Kamakshya ( Kamakhya ) Devi and Nag Dhamooni. Local tradition has it that this was the site of the original palace of the former princely state of Suket – in whose territories these tracts once were.

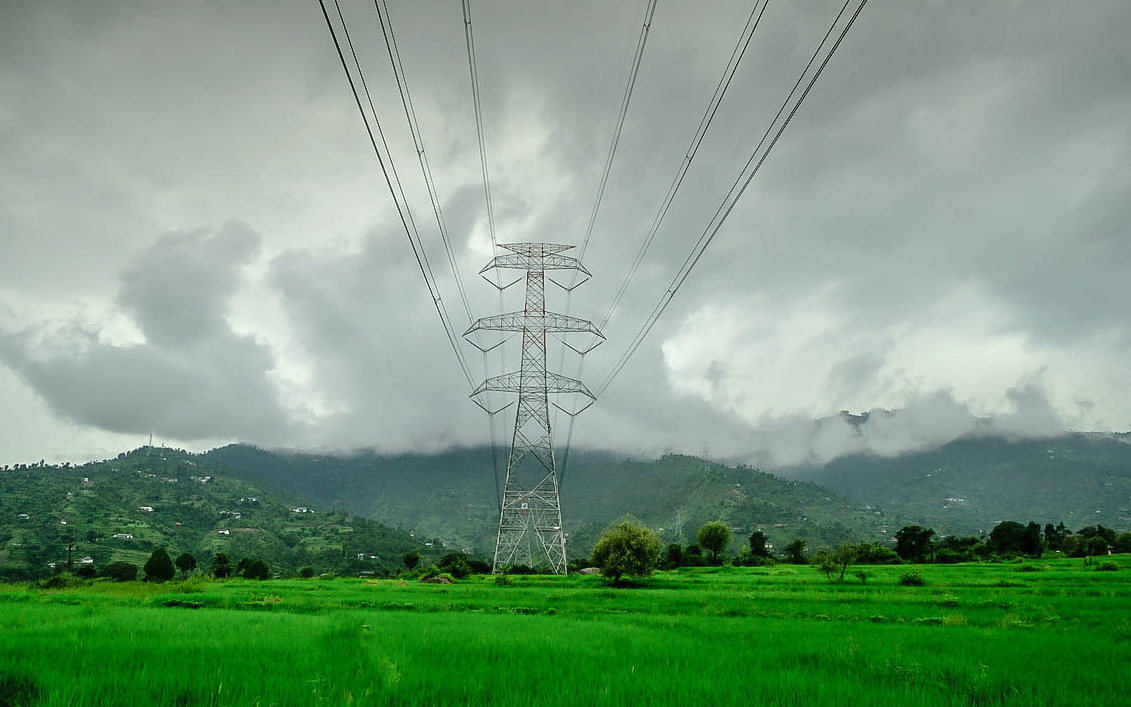
Karsog Valley Power Lines Electricity Farms Himachal Pradesh India

The village of Karsog is surrounded by wide steps of fields and holds the main bazaar of the valley. Agriculture is the mainstay of the area, and it is well known for its wheat, corn, rice and a variety of lentils and beans. The valley is crisscrossed by several brooks and the ‘twin’ Amla ( Imla ) and Bimla streams.

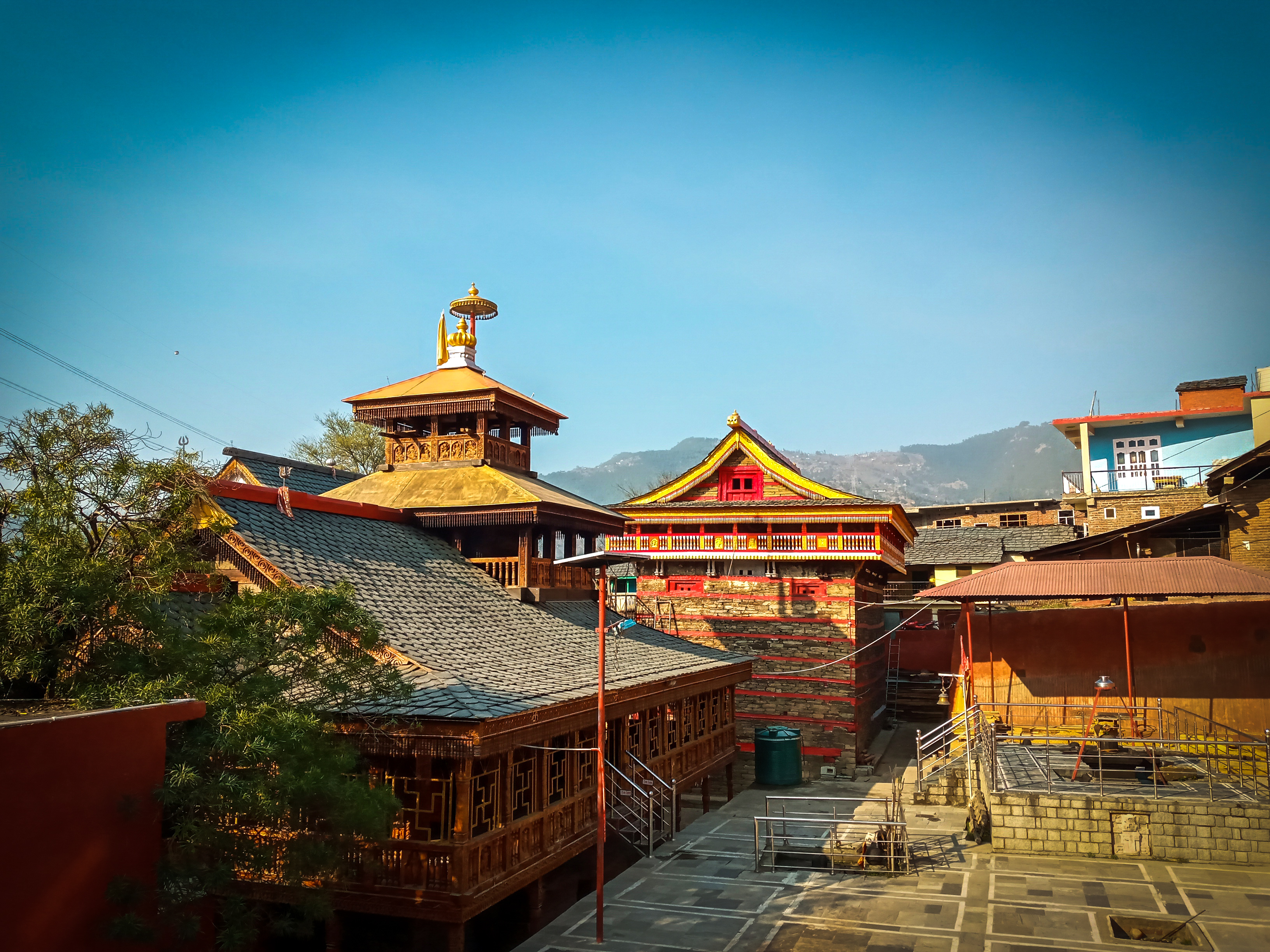
Mamleshwar mahadev temple, karsog

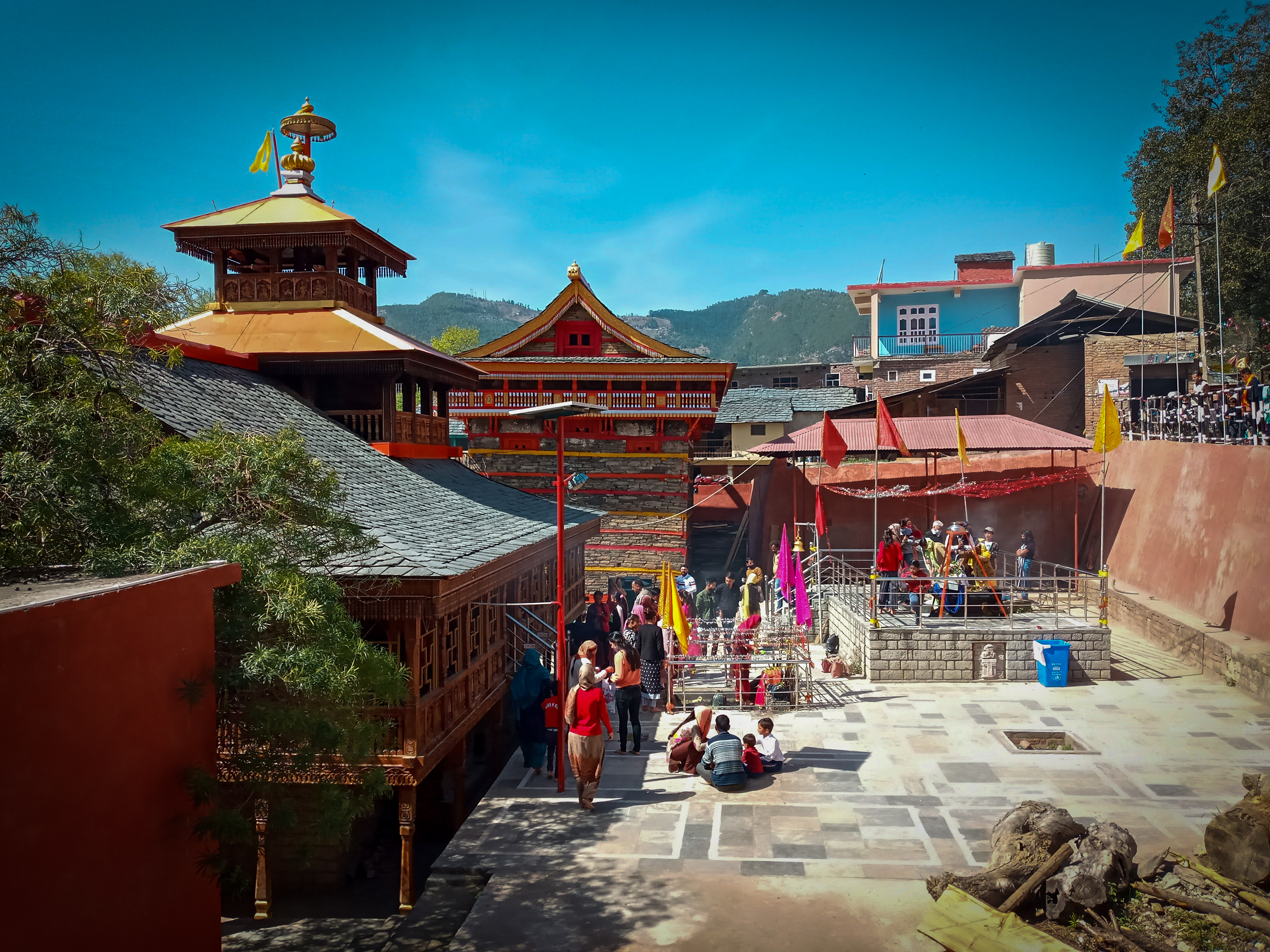

From the Karsog bazaar, the village of Mamel is a bare couple of kilometres and has the temple of Mamleshwara Mahadev. Local belief has it that the temple dates to the times of the epic Mahabharata when it founded by the Pandava brothers. And drawing on India's other great epic, the Ramayana, it is regarded that after King Ravana of Lanka was killed by Bhagwan Rama, his soul could not be free till an image of Bhagwan Shiva was installed here—which was done by Rama with the use of supernatural powers. The sages Parshurama and Brighu are also believed to have meditated at the spot.

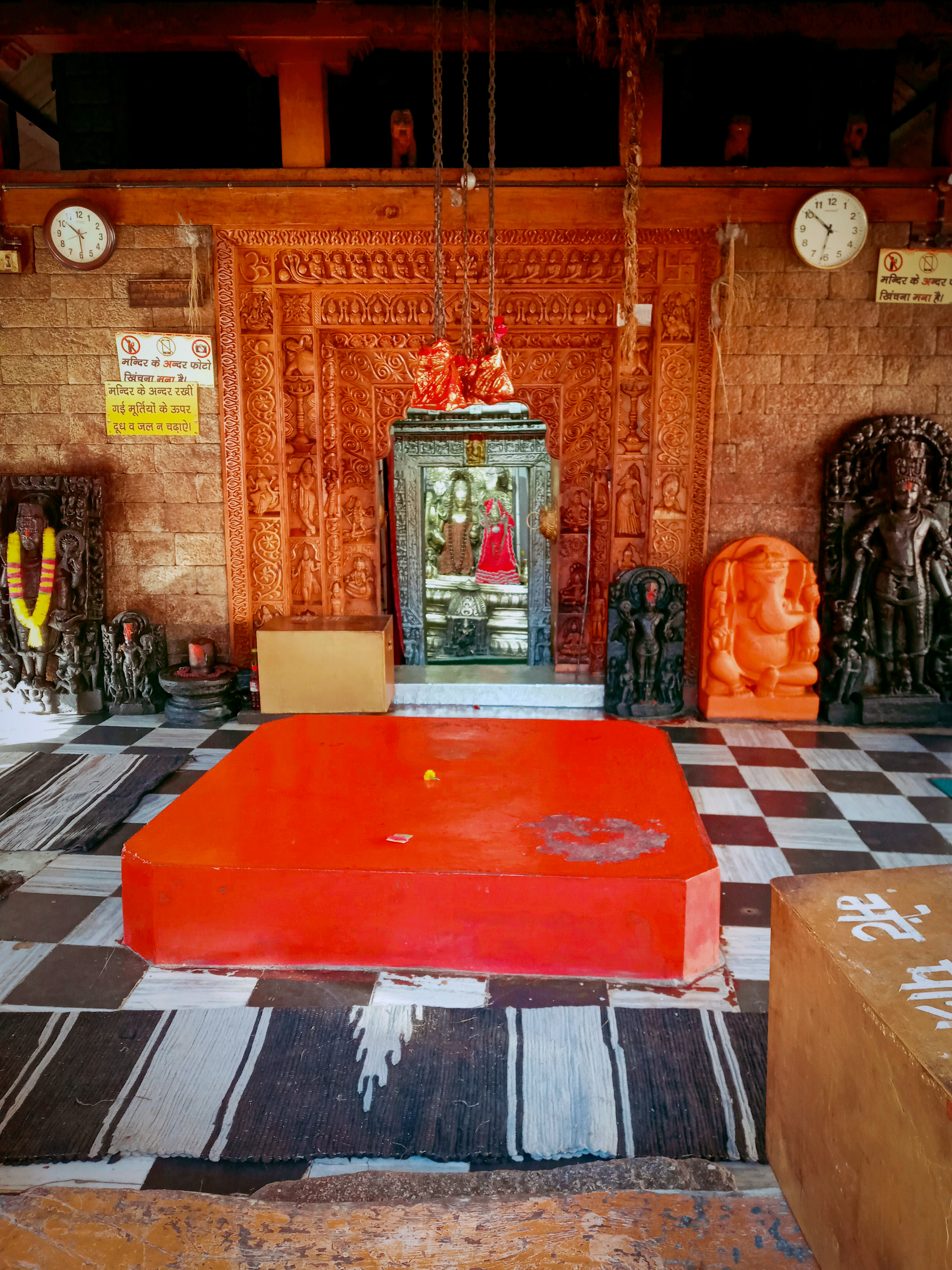

Using sleepers of considerable girth, the temple is a wood and slate structure. I is believed that the sacred fire in the temple has been kept burning from times immemorial - and that the level of the ashes never increases. There is an unusually large drum in the temple with rhinoceros hide. Also shown on request is a large grain of wheat supposedly dating to the mythological times of the Satya Yuga. Some recently excavated shivalingas have been installed by the side of the temple.

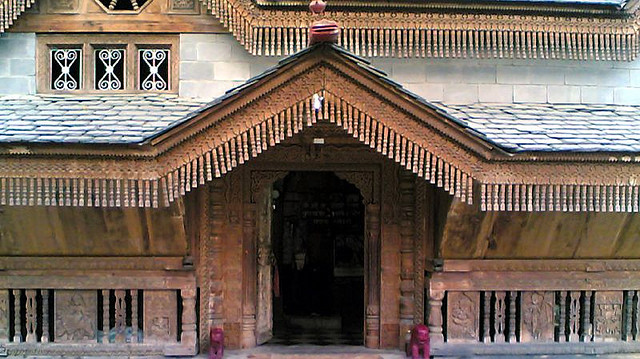
Kamaksha Temple

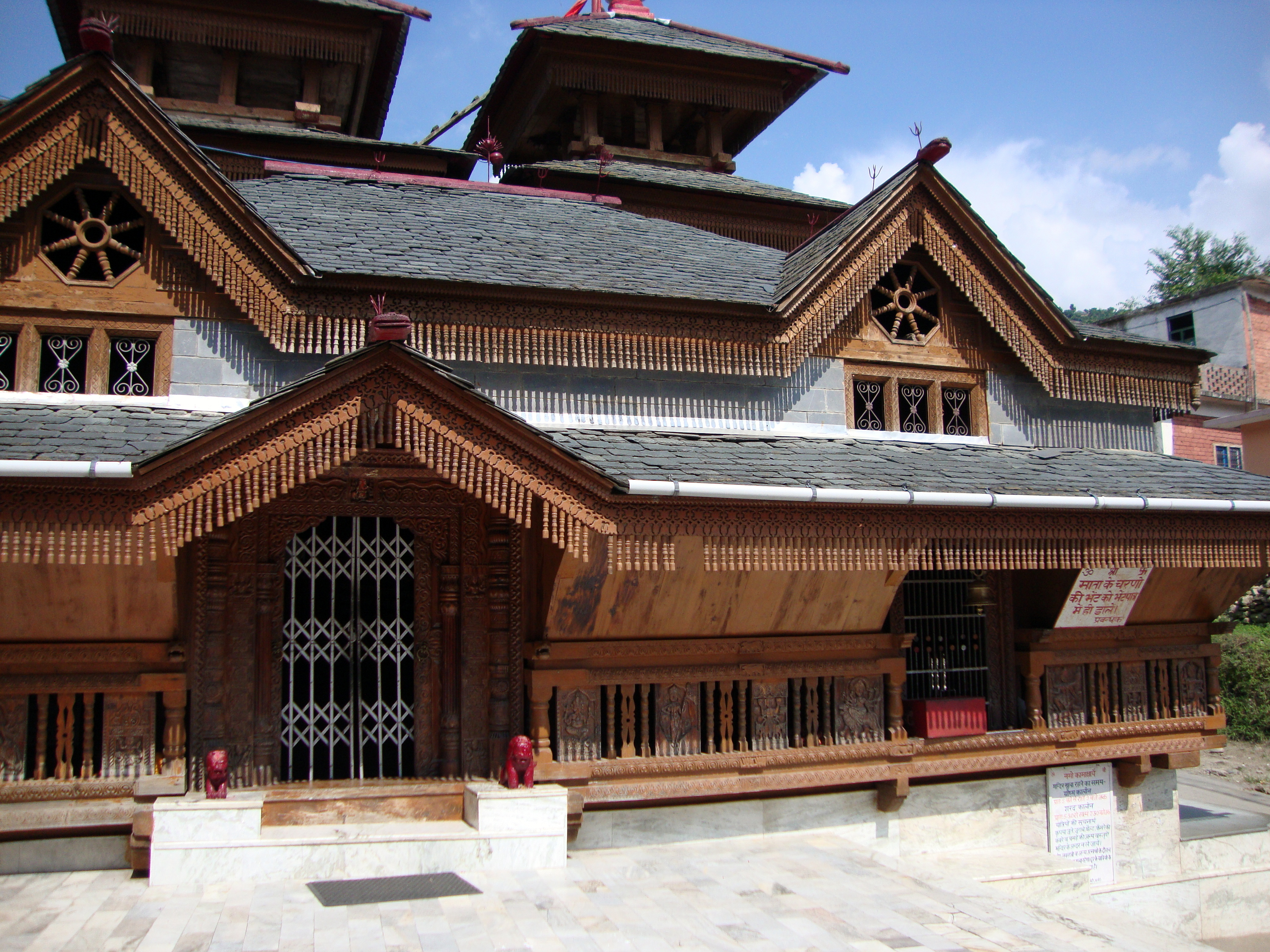

A little further down lies the village of Kau and the temple of Kamakshya Mata. The goddess in this temple is seen as manifest at the spot, due to the meditations and sacrifices of Lord Parashurama. It is noted for the expression and the intensity of the eyes of the principal image cast in ‘ashtadhatu’, the eight primary metals. The deity is depicted as the Mahishasuramardini—the slayer of the demon Mahisha, who stalked the world in the shape of a buffalo. Rebuilt in the original genre, the temple is an example of local woodworking skills. Small chambers hold other images and the ‘bedchamber’ of the goddess. The sanctum sanctorum of the temple is said to be an underground chamber that is not accessible to worshippers. The original stone image of the deity is in this room. A large drum, similar to the one at Mamel is one of the noteworthy objects in the temple.Kamaksha devi temple at karsog valley in Mandi HP

A local story has it that the ruler of the erstwhile princely state of Suket, in whose territories the area fell, was pressuring local people to join the British forces during the Second World War. The people were reluctant to do so, and felt it was the intervention of the goddess that ended the war and saved her people from being slain. An annual fair celebrates the event. Dushera is another major celebration in the temple and several buffaloes are sacrificed.

The hill of Shikari Devi (3359 m) stands as a divider between the Karsog and Janjheli valleys. From both, a steep hike leads to the top. The route is through thick woods that have trees of deodar ( Himalayan cedar), spruce, fir and walnut – and several rare herbs. From Chindi, the trail rises just after the village of Bakrote and guides and ponies can be hired for the trail.

The area is a wildlife sanctuary that hosts the musk deer, ghoral, bears and a variety of pheasants and other birds. Small huts of the migrant Gaddi and Gujjar people lie along the trail and in spring and again in late autumn you can see them moving with their flocks of cattle.

As in practically every other part of Himachal, temples abound in the Chindi-Karsog area, including near Sairi Bangla ( Bungalow ) and at Saranda. There are several dedicated to the deity Nag Dhamooni who is especially worshipped by childless couples. The temple of Mahunag is regarded as one of the most famous in the area. This is considered the core temple of the deity Mahunag, who embodies Karna of the epic Mahabharata.

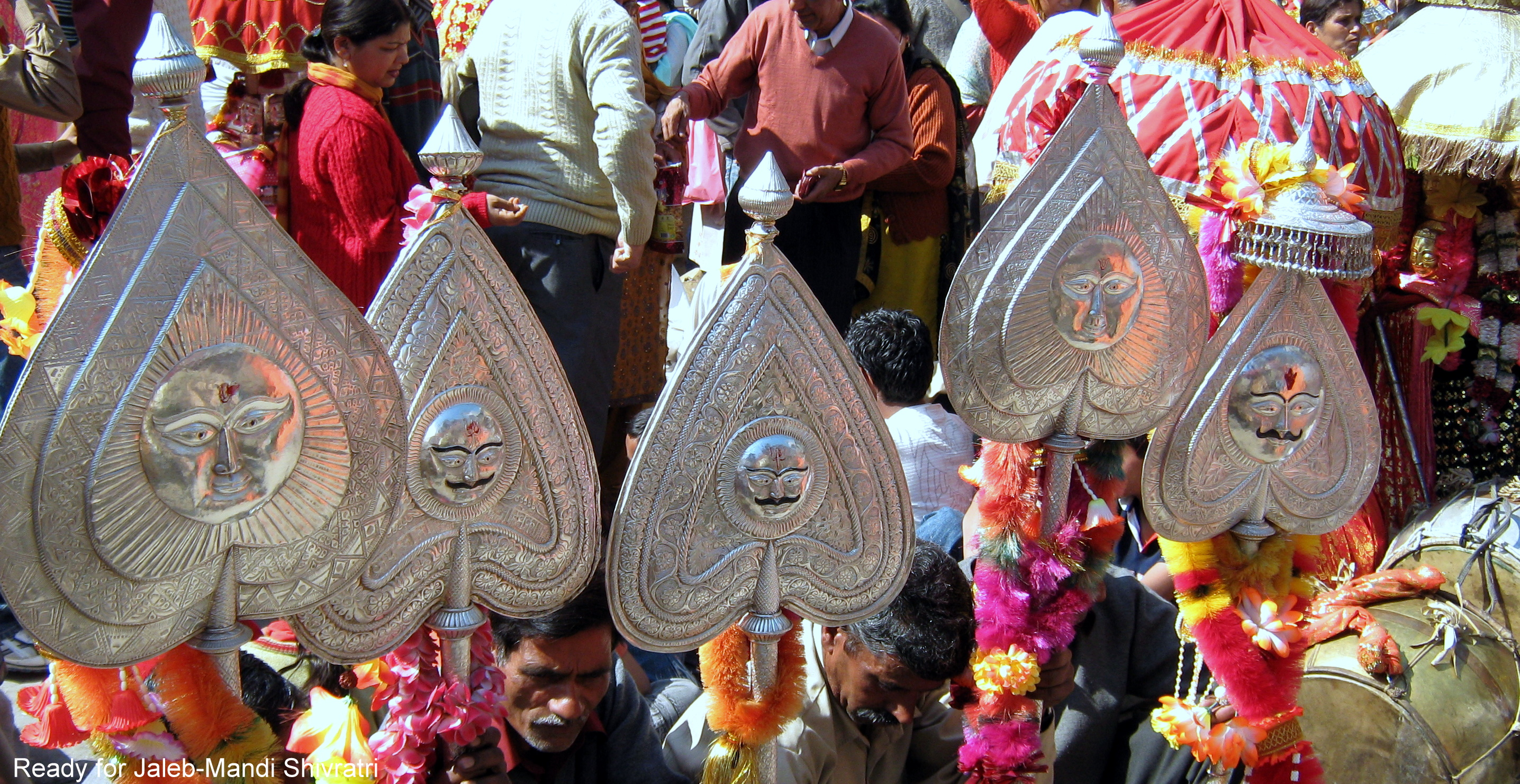
local deities

A little off the drive to Mandi lies the village of Pangana, which was the original seat of the rulers of Suket, until they shifted the capital to Sundernagar. The centuries-old Devi Kot temple is an example of traditional architectural skills. Its wood mesh, packed with dressed stone, rises six stories to approximately fifty feet. The deity Mahamaya and the deified princess of Suket, Chandravati are enshrined in the compound. Past Pangana, and through thick forests and little villages the road winds down to Chail Chowk and the road to Manali. En route and accessible from the village Chowki, after an uphill hike of half a dozen kilometres through thick woods, lies the temple of Kamrunag. For centuries, this temple has been held in high veneration. Through all this time the offerings of gold, silver, ornaments and coins have been dropped in the small lake that lies in front of the temple.

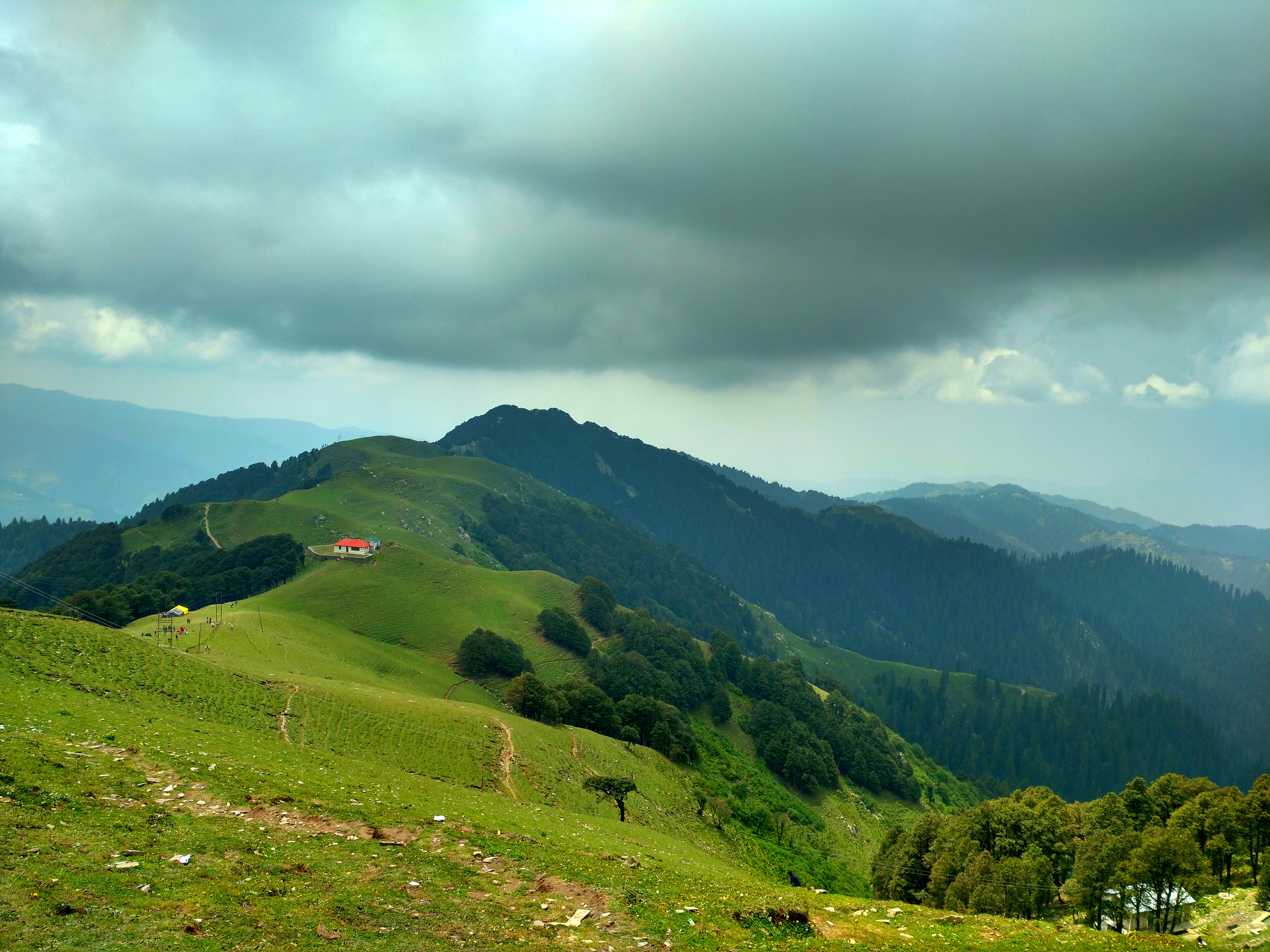

Shikari Devi Temple is near to Karsog valley. Shikari Devi Temple is situated at the height of 3359m. Shikari Devi can be accessible by two ways from Karsog and Janjehli.

Janjehli and Karsog are popular for adventure activities like trekking, night safari, and mountaineering. Shikari Devi is at a distance of 11 km from Janjehli and 14 km from a place known as Bakhrot near Karsog. At night, lights can be seen from the houses on the nearby mountain ranges like Pir Panjal and Hatu ranges.
