= Mamaleshwar Mahadev =

Temple in Himachal Pradesh

Mamleshwar Mahadev temple is a Shiva temple located in Karsog town of the Mandi district of Himachal. The Mamleshwar Temple is situated in Karsog valley surrounded by high hills. It is about 100 km from Shimla and can be visited throughout the year.

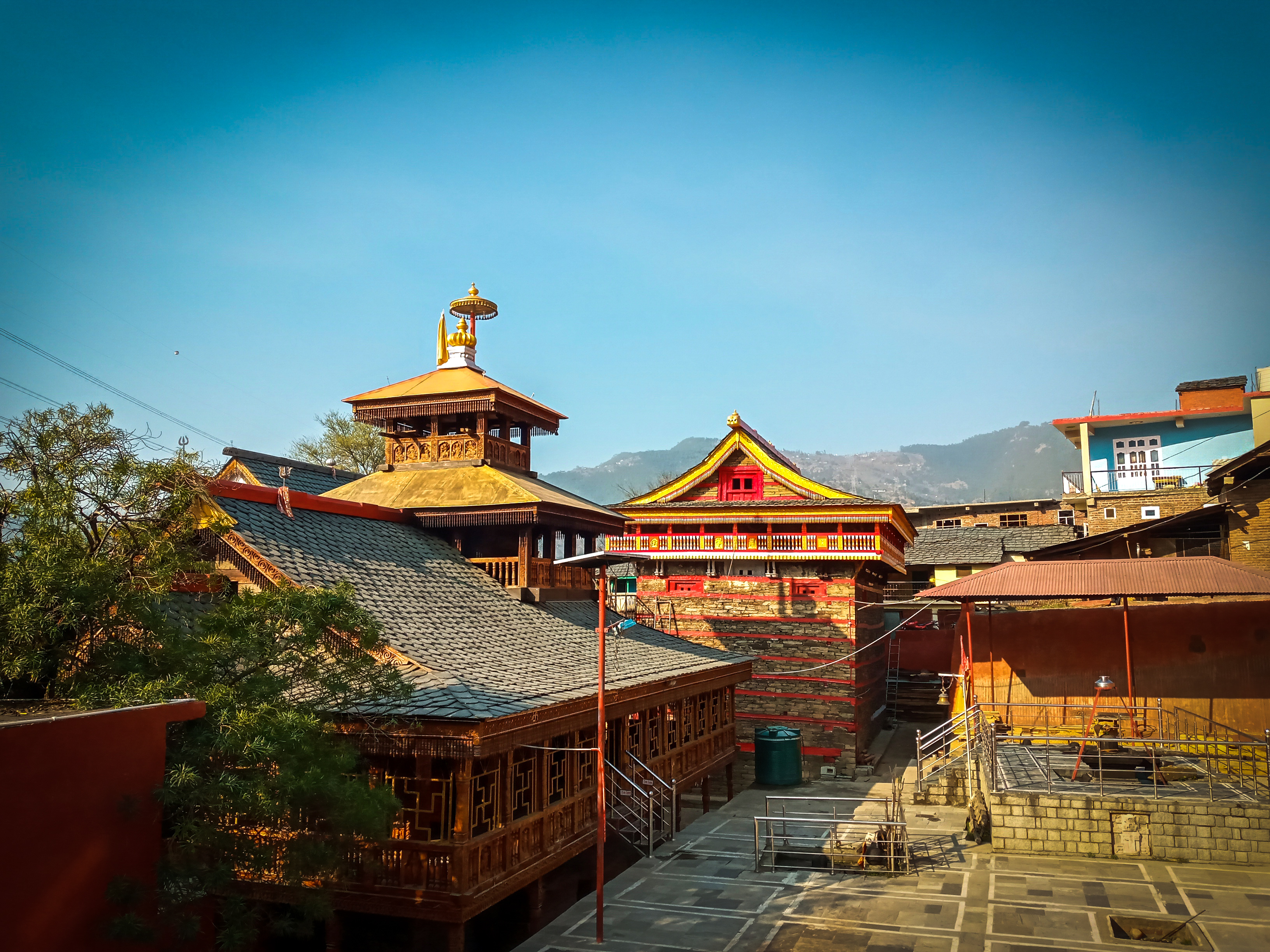
Mamleshwar mahadev temple, karsog

== History ==
According to folk belief, Maharishi Bhrigu meditated here. A Kinnar girl by name Mamlesha used to serve him. This girl was endowed with modesty. Mamlesha Tal was also formed here with the same name. Sage Bhrigu became fascinated by this Kinnar girl Mamlesha. The sage married the girl. Mamlesha fell pregnant to the sage. The sage worshipped Mahakala Shiva to avoid the defect in marriage to a mleccha girl. This is how Shiva was established here. From the name of the Kinnar girl - Mamlesha - Shiva was called Mamleshwar and this village became famous as Mamel.

According to folk belief, this temple witnessed Satya Yuga, Treta Yuga, Dvapara Yuga and now Kali Yuga. It is a sacred place where Rishi Bhrigu meditated. During the exile period, the Pandavas constructed the outer part of the temple. A demon was living nearby in a cave. The villagers were bound to send one person daily as a food for the demon. One day a mother was weeping because that day it was the turn of her son. At that time, the Pandavas were guests of that house. Then Bhima told the mother not to worry about it. He told, "I will go to the Demon". In the battle with demon, Bhima killed him in a place called "lyad" and returned. Then the Pandavas made an akhand dhuna (eternal fire) in memory of this victory and the demon got moksha.

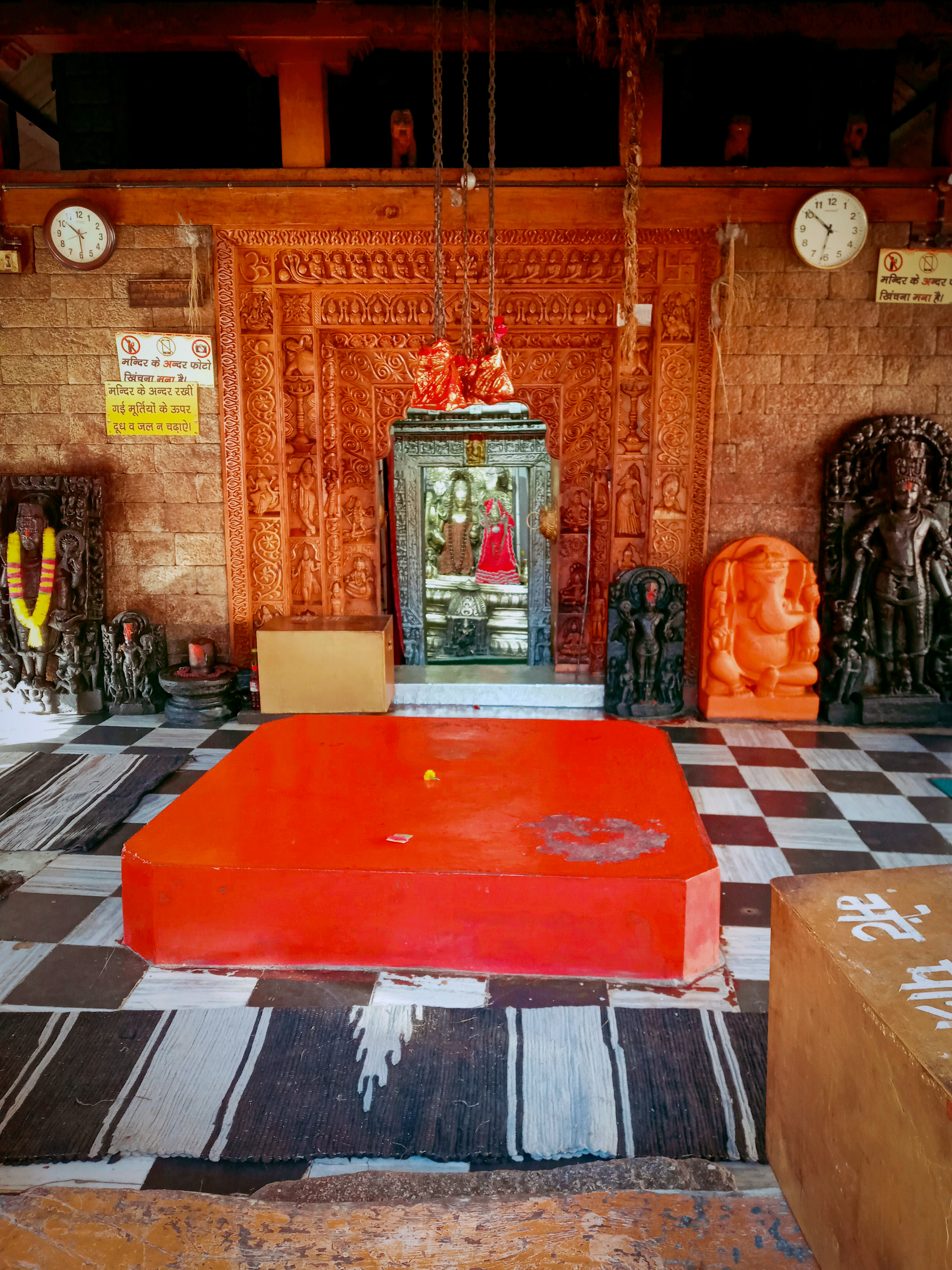

== Major attractions ==
Nestled in the Himalayas, the temple is situated in Karsog, a picturesque small town in Mandi district of Himachal Pradesh.

It is believed that the 'Agni Kund' (sacred fire) was lit by the Pandavas - the five acknowledged sons of Pandu as mentioned in the epic of Mahabharata - around 50 centuries ago and has been burning ever since. Locals are of the belief that the Pandavas lit this fire pit in the month of Sravana - the fifth month in the Nanakshahi calendar and in the Hindu calendar.

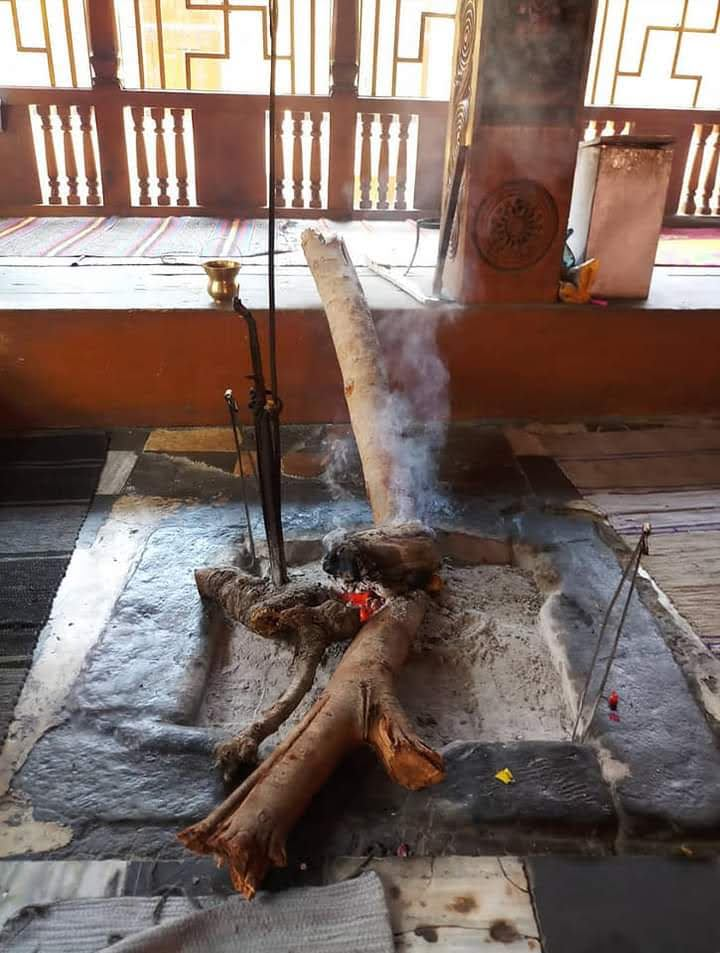
Agnikund

== 5000-year-old wheat grain ==
There are many other things that exist in the temple premises associated with the Mahabharata period. One of them is the five thousand years old wheat grain that weigh 250 grams.

It is believed that the Pandavas had grown the grain to eat during their period of agyatvas.

== Bhima's drum ==
Locals say that a drum was built by Bhima himself which he used to play during his free time.

According to another belief about this drum, this drum is made from a huge bekhal tree. This bekhal tree was in a village nearby, in which a demon lived. The demon was slain by the gods and huge drums were made from that tree by cutting it into pieces. This drum is said to be one of them.

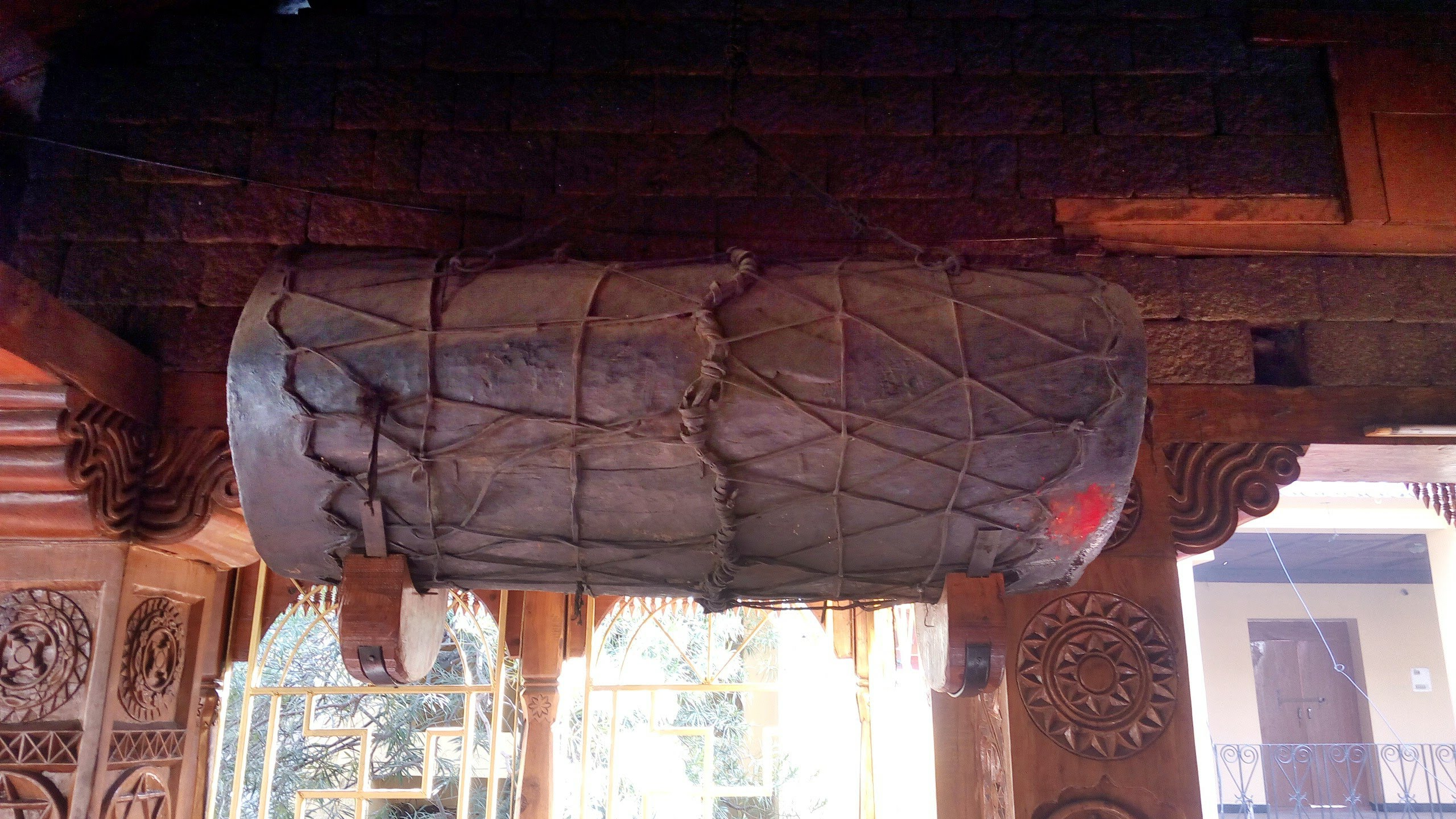
Big bhekhal dhol
