= Sunni, Himachal Pradesh =

Sunni
- Town and tehsil
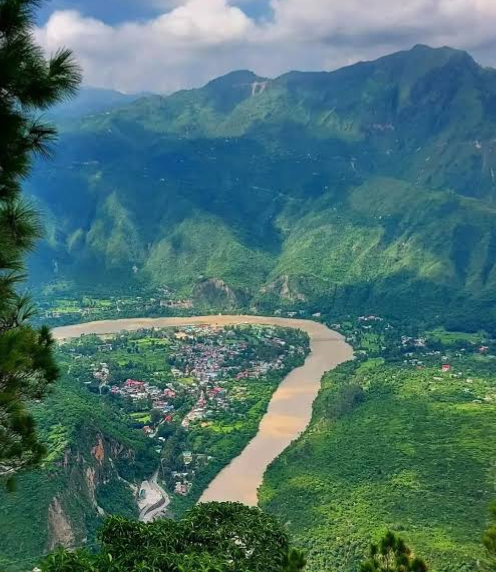
- Sunni town in valley with Satluj river flowing as seen from uphill

- Location in Shimla, Himachal Pradesh, India Sunni (India)
- Coordinates: 31.24°N 77.12°E
- Country: India
- District: Shimla
- State: Himachal Pradesh
- Elevation: 670 m (2,200 ft)

Population (2005)
  - Total: 2,836

Languages
  - Official: Hindi
  - Native: Mahasui (Keonthali)
- Time zone: UTC+5:30 (IST)
- PIN: 171301
- Vehicle registration: HP-52AA

Sunni is a town, nagar panchayat and tehsil in Shimla district in the Indian state of Himachal Pradesh. It is about 38 kilometres (24 mi) from the state's capital Shimla. It is situated in a valley on the banks of Satluj river. It was the capital of the former Bhajji princely state, one of the several states of the Punjab States Agency. Tattapani in Satluj river is a famous site here, known for its hot springs. It is also an important location for religious purposes.

== Geography ==
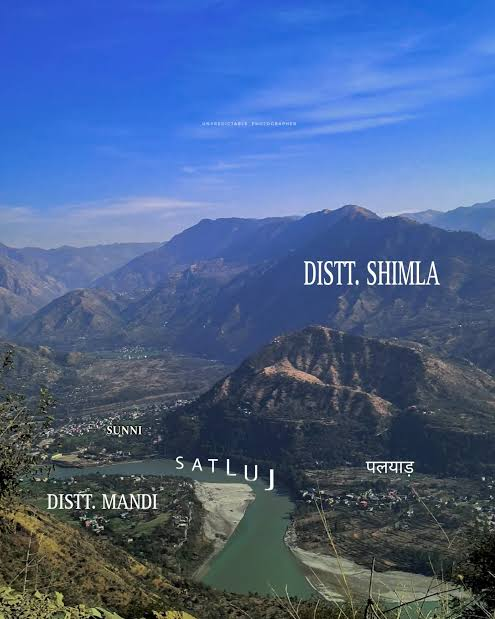
Satluj river divides Himachal Pradesh's two districts, Shimla and Mandi. Sunni is located in Shimla district

Sunni is located at 31.24°N 77.12°E. It has an average elevation of 670 metres (2198 feet). The town is situated in Shimla district on border of Mandi district as Satluj river divides the two. Sunni has a popular tourist destination Tattapani and near Sunni in Khatnol block, there is a 7 km trek to a popular temple named Shali Mata Temple situated on Shali Tibba peak.

== Demographics ==
As of 2001 India census, Sunni had a population of 1529. Males constitute 50% of the population and females 50%. Sunni has an average literacy rate of 80%, higher than the national average of 59.5%: male literacy is 82%, and female literacy is 78%. In Sunni, 12% of the population is under 6 years of age.
