= Mahunag =

Village in Shimla, Himachal Pradesh, India

Mahunag bakari kothi mahunag Mahunaag, Mahu Nag, Karna
- village
- Location in Himachal Pradesh, India
- Coordinates: 31.0710483°N 77.1186537°E
- Country: India
- State: Himachal Pradesh

Languages
  - Official: Hindi
- Time zone: UTC+5:30 (IST)

Mahunag is a village in Karsog subdivision of Mandi district, Himachal Pradesh.

The village is on a hilltop and bears spiritual and historical significance. Shri Mool Mahunag temple and the temple of Devta Mahunag are tourist spots.

In April 2025, Sewa Mahu Gram Panchayat spent Rs.7 lakh to build a beautiful park with the support of works under the Mahatma Gandhi National Rural Employment Guarantee scheme.

The village also runs a fair every year.
