= Tattapani (Himachal Pradesh) =

Tattapani तत्तापानी
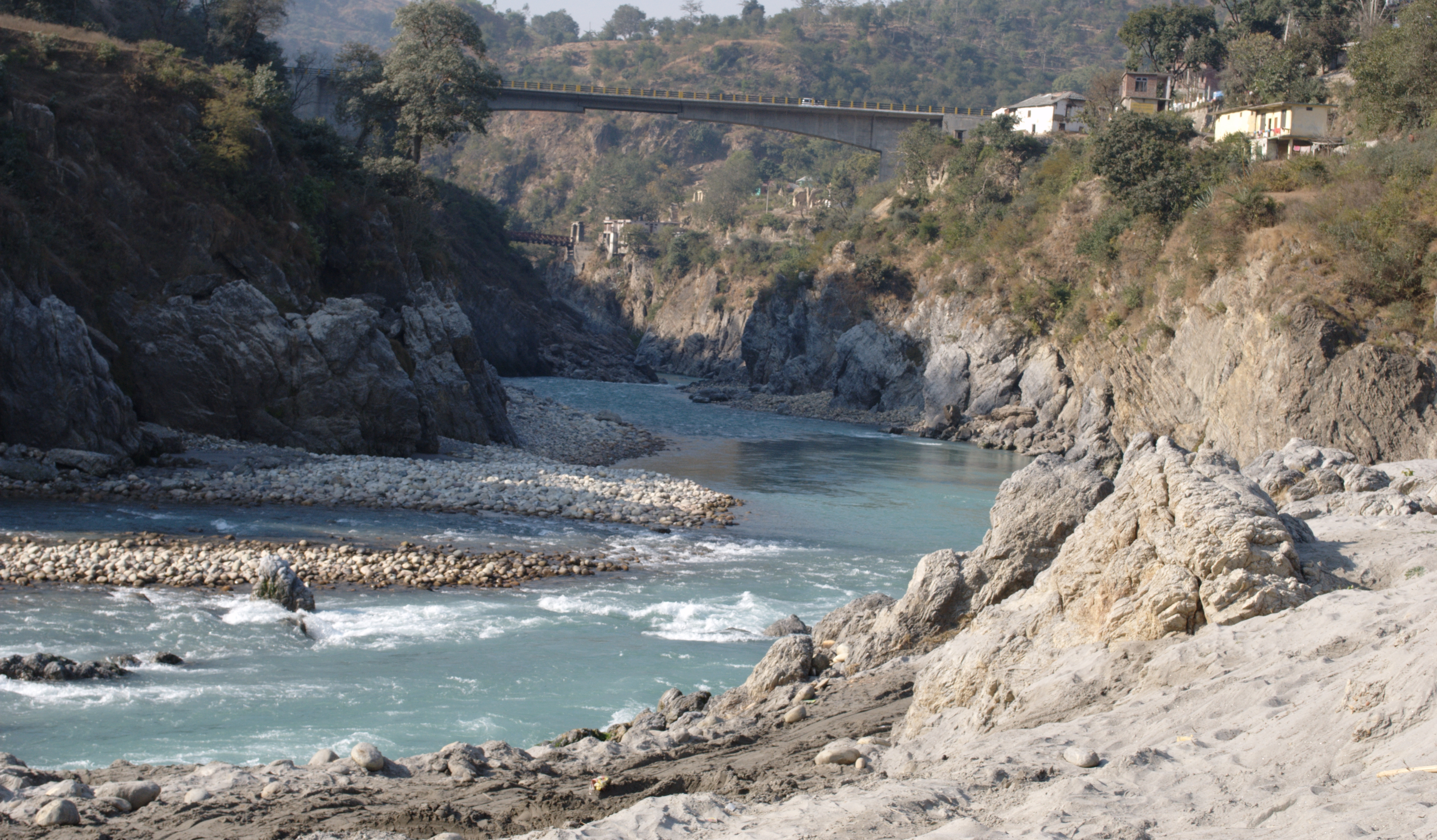

- Location within India
- Coordinates: 31.2487°N 77.0878°E
- Country: India
- Province: Himachal Pradesh
- Elevation: 665 m (2,182 ft)

Population
  - Total: 2,000
- Time zone: UTC+5:30 (IST)
- Calling code: 01907

Tattapani village is located in Sunni near Karsog, Mandi district at a distance of 52 km from Shimla and 29 km from Naldehra. It is situated on the right bank of river Satluj at an altitude of 2,230 ft. above the sea level.

It is known for its hot water springs.
