= Jaiee =

- village
- Location in Himachal Pradesh, India Jaiee (India)
- Coordinates: 31.113°N 77.427°E
- Country: India
- State: Himachal Pradesh
- District: Shimla
- Elevation: 1,490 m (4,890 ft)

Population (2001)
  - Total: 116

Languages
  - Official: Hindi
  - Regional: Mahasu Pahari (Shimla Saraji)
- Time zone: UTC+5:30 (IST)
- PIN: 171220
- Telephone code: 911783xxxxxx
- Vehicle registration: HP-09

Jaiee is a village in Himachal Pradesh, within the Tehsil (administrative district) of Theog, Shimla district, India.

== Village Profile ==
As of Census of India 2001

Area details
Area of village (in hectares) - 52
Number of households - 24
Population data based on 2001 census
Total population - Persons - 116
Total population - Males - 52
Total population - Females - 64
Scheduled castes population - Persons - 7
Scheduled castes population - Males - 3
Scheduled castes population - Females - 4
Education facilities
Education facilities - Available
Number of primary schools - 1
Middle school available within range - Within 5 km
College available within range - More than 10 km
Medical facilities
Allopathic hospitals available within range - More than 10 km
Number of ayurvedic dispensary - Within 5 km
Primary health centre available within range - Within 5 km
Post, telegraph and telephone facilities
Post office available within range - Within 5 km
Number of telephone connections - 3
Approach to villages
Nearest town - Theog
Distance from the nearest town (in kilometer(s)) - 17
Land use (Two decimal) in hectares
Unirrigated area - 15.00
Culturable waste (including gauchar and groves) - 31.00
Area not available for cultivation - 6.00
